= Iran–Iraq War =

1980–1988 armed conflict in West Asia

- Part of aftermath of the Iranian Revolution, Iraqi–Kurdish conflict
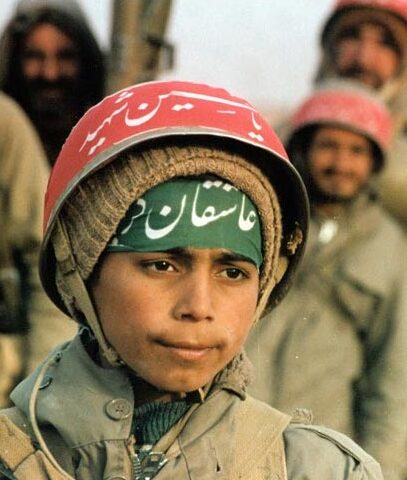
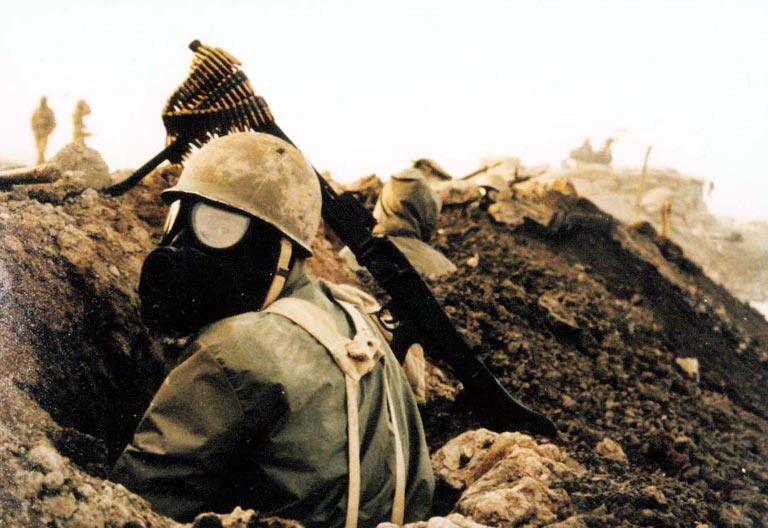
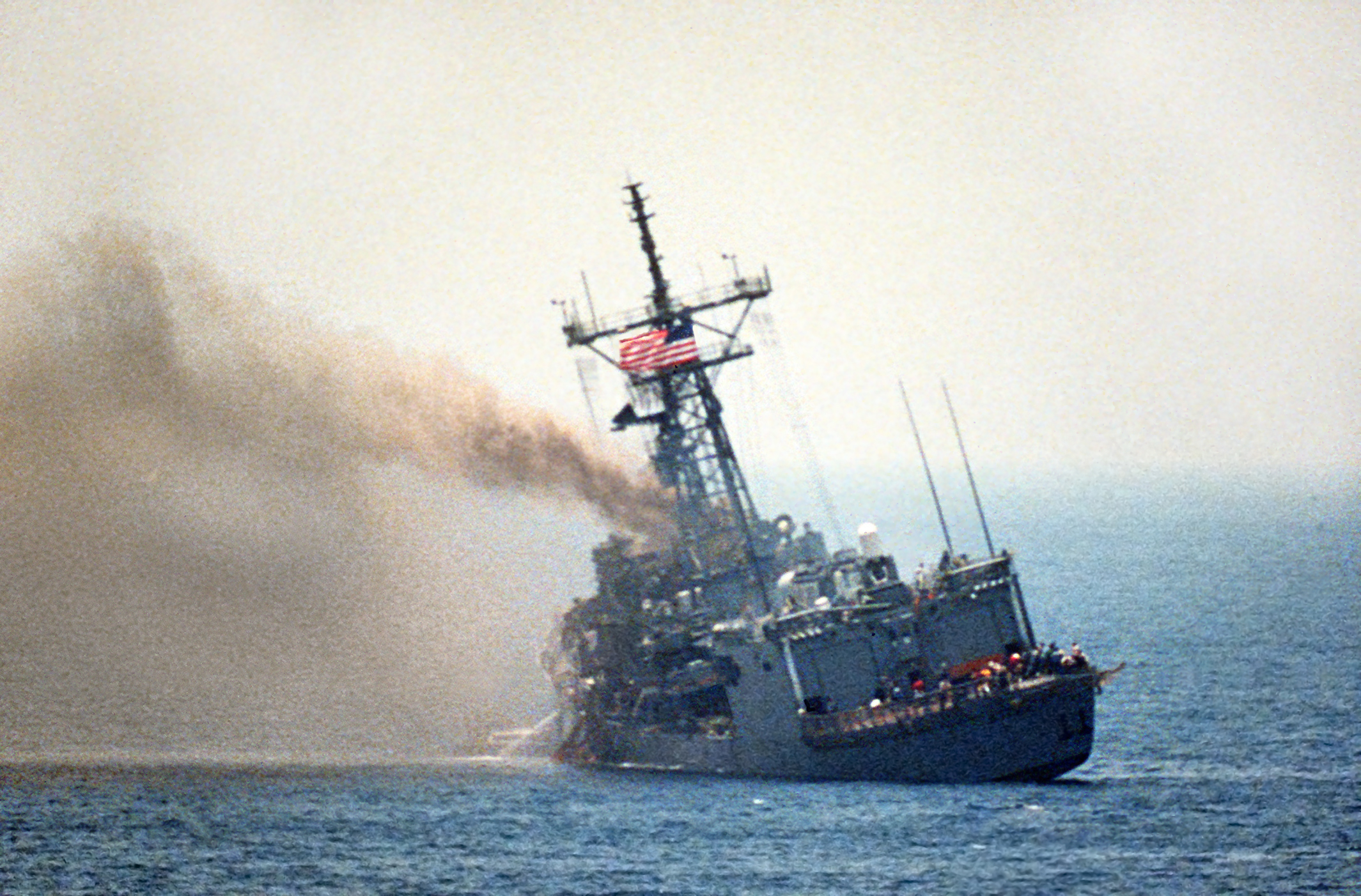
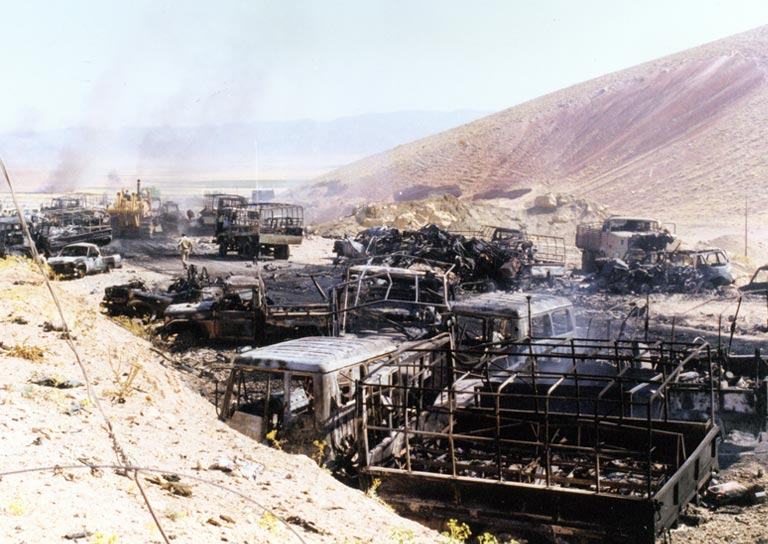
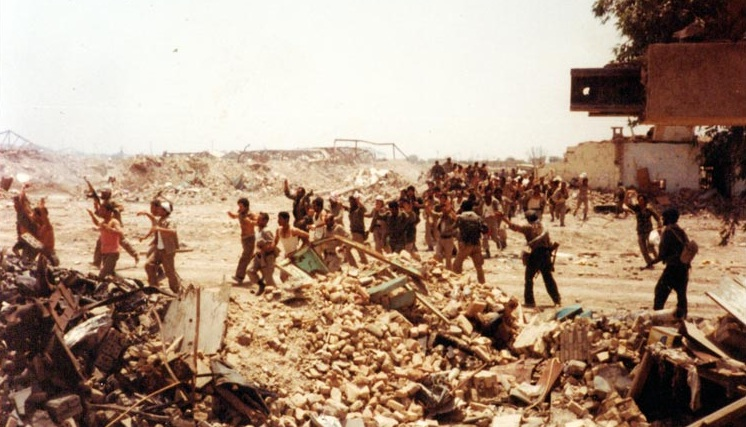
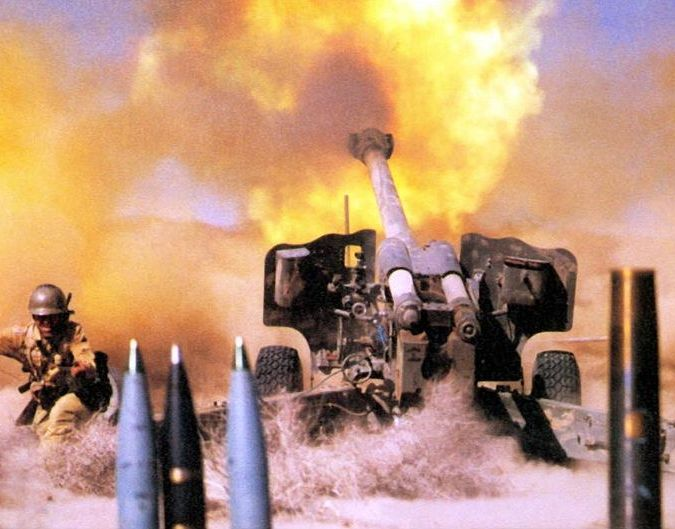
- Top-left to bottom-right: An Iranian child soldier on the frontlines; An Iranian soldier in a trench wearing a gas mask to guard against Iraqi chemical attacks; The USS Stark listing to port after being struck by an Iraqi Exocet missile; Burned-out vehicles in the aftermath of Operation Mersad; Iraqi prisoners of war after the recapture of Khorramshahr by Iranian forces; The 152 mm gun-howitzer D-20 being used by the Iranian Army
Date	22 September 1980 (Note: Iraq claims that the war began on 4 September 1980, when Iran bombed Iraqi towns.) – 20 August 1988 (7 years, 10 months, 4 weeks and 1 day)
Location	Iran; Iraq (Note: Also: 1983–1988 Kuwait terror attacks, 1981 Iraqi embassy bombing in Beirut, Lebanon hostage crisis, 1983 Beirut barracks bombings and 1985–86 Paris attacks.)
Result	Inconclusive (Note: Iraq claimed victory following a successful 1988 counter-offensive aimed at expelling Iranian forces from Iraq which compelled Iran to submit to a ceasefire the same year, and also due to the country becoming the dominant power in the Middle East as a result of the conflict. Iran also claimed victory for expelling Iraqi forces from Iran following 1982 offensives, despite failing in its later-goal to overthrow the Iraqi government and also despite suffering higher military and economic losses than Iraq.)
Territorial changes	Status quo ante bellum (Note: After the war concluded, Iraq continued to maintain control over the entire Shatt al-Arab and other Iranian territories it had occupied along the border, covering an area of 9,600 km^{2}. It was not until 16 August 1990 that Iraq agreed to return these occupied territories to Iran and to divide sovereignty over the Shatt al-Arab. This restored the border to the terms established by the 1975 Algiers Agreement.)

Belligerents
Iran	Iraq
KDP; PUK; ISCI; Islamic Dawa Party; Hezbollah; Shia volunteers (Note: from: Afghanistan; Abuzar Brigade; Iraq; Badr Organization; Lebanon; Hezbollah; Pakistan; Tehreek-e-Jafaria (Pakistan); Sipah-e-Muhammad Pakistan; Kuwait; Bahrain; India)	DRFLA; NCRI • MEK • PDKI; Salvation Force; Arab volunteers (Note: from: Egypt; Jordan; Morocco; North Yemen; Sudan; Tunisia)

Commanders and leaders
(Iran) Ruhollah Khomeini; (Iran) Akbar Rafsanjani; (Iran) Ali Khamenei (WIA); (Iran) Mohammad-Ali Rajai X; (Iran) Mir-Hossein Mousavi	(Ba'athist Iraq) Saddam Hussein; (Ba'athist Iraq) Adnan Khayr Allah; (Ba'athist Iraq) Abdul Jabbar Shanshal; (Ba'athist Iraq) Izzat Ibrahim al-Douri; (Ba'athist Iraq) Tariq Aziz

Units involved
See order of battle	See order of battle

Strength
Start of war: 110,000–215,000 soldiers More: 1,700–2,100 tanks (500–1,150 operable) 1,000–1,900 armoured vehicles (1,300 operable) 300–1,100 artillery pieces 421–485 fighter-bombers (200–205 fully operational) 750–835 helicopters (240 fully operational) In 1982: 350,000 soldiers 700 tanks 2,700 armoured vehicles 400 artillery pieces 350 aircraft 700 helicopters In 1988: 600,000–850,000 soldiers 1,500+ tanks (Note: Pollack gives the figure as 1,000 for fully operational tanks in April 1988. Cordesman gives the figure as 1,500+ operational tanks in March 1988 (1,298 were captured by the Iraqis by July 1988, 200 were still in the hands of the Iranians, and an unknown number were destroyed), with an unknown number in workshops.) 800–1,400 armoured vehicles 600–900 heavy artillery pieces 60–80 fighter-bombers 70–90 helicopters KDP: 45,000 Peshmerga (1986–88) PUK: 12,000 Peshmerga (1986–88)	Start of war: 200,000–210,000 soldiers More: 1,750–2,800 tanks 2,350–4,000 APCs 1,350–1,400 artillery pieces 295–380 fighter-bombers 300–350 helicopters In 1982: 175,000 soldiers 1,200 tanks 2,300 armoured vehicles 400 artillery pieces 450 aircraft 180 helicopters In 1988: 800,000–1,500,000 soldiers 3,400–5,000 tanks 4,500–10,000 APCs 2,300–12,000 artillery pieces 360–900 fighter-bombers 140–1,000 helicopters KDPI: 30,000 Peshmerga (1980–83) MEK: 15,000 fighters (1981–83, 87–88)

Casualties and losses
Military dead: 200,000–600,000 (Note: Estimates of Iranian casualties during the Iran–Iraq War vary.) More: 123,220–160,000 killed 60,711 missing (Iranian claim) 800,000 killed (Iraqi claim) 320,000–500,000 wounded 40,000–42,875 captured 11,000–16,000 civilian dead Economic loss: $627 billion	Military dead: 105,000–500,000 (Note: Estimates of Iraqi casualties during the Iran–Iraq War vary.) More: 400,000 wounded 70,000 captured Economic loss: $561 billion
- Civilian dead: 100,000+ (Note: The total 100,000+ civilians killed during the war does not include 50,000–200,000 Kurdish civilians killed in the Anfal campaign.); Total dead: 450,000–500,000

The Iran–Iraq War, also called the First Imposed War, Eight-Year War, or Sacred Defense by Iran, began with the Iraqi invasion of Iran in September 1980. After eight years of conflict, both countries accepted a ceasefire deal brokered by the United Nations, which became effective in August 1988. The war caused around 500,000 deaths (excluding numbers from the related Anfal campaign), making it the deadliest conventional war ever fought between regular armies of developing countries.

In starting the war, the Iraqi government—led by President Saddam Hussein—primarily wanted to prevent Ruhollah Khomeini, Iran's leader following the 1979 Iranian Revolution, from exporting Iran's new state ideology to Iraq. Iraq also feared that Iran, being a theocratic state mostly composed of Shia Muslims, would rally Iraq's Shia majority against the Sunni Muslim-controlled Baʽathist government. Iraq also wished to replace Iran as the main national power in the Persian Gulf. The war followed a long-running history of border disputes between the two states, as a result of which Iraq planned to retake the eastern bank of the Shatt al-Arab river that it had ceded to Iran in the 1975 Algiers Agreement.

The conflict involved large-scale trench warfare, and deliberate attacks on civilians, including Iraqi chemical attacks. At the start of the war, Iraq expected a decisive victory, considering Iran's post-revolutionary chaos, but their invasion had stalled by December 1980. The Iranian military then gained momentum, and recaptured all their territory by June 1982. Having pushed Iraqi forces back to the pre-war borders, Iran launched an invasion of Iraq, which created a five-year offensive. In mid-1988, Iraq launched a series of counter-offensives that created the military stalemate present at the war's end.

Iraq was aided by the People's Mojahedin Organization of Iran, the United States, the United Kingdom, the Soviet Union, France, Italy, Yugoslavia, and most Arab countries. Iran was aided by the Kurdistan Democratic Party, the Patriotic Union of Kurdistan, Syria, Libya, North Korea, China, South Yemen, Pakistan, Cuba, and Israel. Meanwhile, Iraqi support for Arab separatists in Iran increased.

After years of military and economic losses, decreasing morale, intensifying Iran–U.S. relations, and little international action against Iraqi attacks on Iranian civilians, Iran agreed to a ceasefire with Iraq under United Nations Security Council Resolution 598. The war did not create any permanent border changes, and neither country received war reparations afterwards. Both sides suffered financially. They continued engaging in low-level military conflict until relations improved following Saddam's overthrow in 2003.

== Background ==
=== Iran–Iraq relations ===
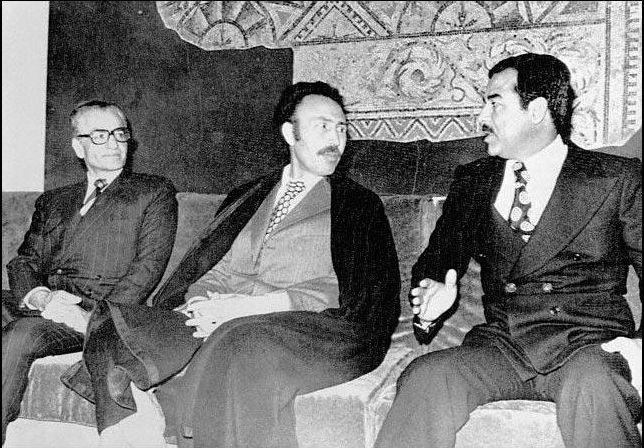
A meeting of Mohammad Reza Pahlavi, Houari Boumédiène, and Saddam Hussein (left to right) during the Algiers Agreement in 1975

In 1937, Iran and Iraq signed a treaty to settle their dispute over control of the Shatt al-Arab river; they agreed that Iranian ships had to pay tolls when they used the river. In 1969, Iran broke the treaty, as their ships no longer paid the tolls. The Shah of Iran argued that the treaty had been unfair. Iraq threatened war, but did nothing at this time, as their weaker military became threatened when Iranian naval forces sailed down the Shatt al-Arab in a show of force. The new Iraqi–Iranian tensions led to significant bloodshed, which lasted until the 1975 Algiers Agreement, when Iraq ceded to Iran the eastern bank of the river. Their relations briefly improved in 1978, when Iranian agents in Iraq discovered plans for a pro-Soviet coup d'état against Iraq's government. When informed of this plot, Iraq's president Saddam Hussein ordered the execution of dozens of his army's officers, and expelled Ruhollah Khomeini from Iraq, who led clerical opposition to the Shah.

=== After the Iranian Revolution ===
Tensions between Iraq and Iran were fuelled by Iran's Islamic revolution and its appearance of being a Pan-Islamic force, in contrast to Iraq's Arab nationalism. Despite Iraq's goal of regaining the Shatt al-Arab, the Iraqi government initially seemed to welcome the Iranian revolution, which overthrew Shah Mohammad Reza Pahlavi, who was seen as a common enemy. There were frequent clashes along the Iran–Iraq border throughout 1980.

Khomeini called on Iraqis to overthrow the Ba'ath government, which was received with considerable anger in Baghdad. In July 1979, despite Khomeini's call, Saddam gave a speech praising the Iranian Revolution and called for an Iraqi–Iranian friendship based on non-interference in each other's internal affairs. When Khomeini rejected Saddam's overture by calling for Islamic revolution in Iraq, Saddam was alarmed. Iran's new Islamic administration was regarded in Baghdad as an irrational, existential threat to the Ba'ath government, especially because the Ba'ath party, having a secular nature, discriminated against and posed a threat to the fundamentalist Shia movement in Iraq, whose clerics were Iran's allies within Iraq and whom Khomeini saw as oppressed.

In April 1980, the Islamic Dawa Party, an Iraqi Islamist group with supportive ties to Iran, attempted to assassinate Tariq Aziz, a high ranking Ba'athist and Iraq's deputy prime minister, in retaliation for a March decree declaring "membership of Dawa [to be] a capital offense". The attempt failed and instead killed several students. Three days later, the funeral procession for the dead students was bombed. This failed assassination plot, carried out by an Iran-backed group, formed a part of Iraq's casus belli for the invasion of Iran. Iraq's immediate response was to order the execution of Muhammad Baqir al-Sadr, an Iraqi Shi'ite cleric seen as the public face of the Dawa movement, along with al-Sadr's sister. On 30 April, Iraq organised an attack on the Iranian embassy in London.

Saddam's primary interest in war may have also stemmed from his desire to right the supposed "wrong" of the Algiers Agreement, in addition to finally achieving his desire of becoming the regional superpower. Saddam's goal was to supplant Egypt as the "leader of the Arab world" and to achieve hegemony over the Persian Gulf. He saw Iran's increased weakness due to revolution, sanctions, and international isolation. Saddam had invested heavily in Iraq's military since his defeat against Iran in 1975, buying large amounts of weaponry from the Soviet Union and France. Between 1973 and 1980, Iraq purchased numerous tanks and Soviet-made aircraft.

By 1980, Iraq possessed 242,000 soldiers, second only to Egypt in the Arab world, 2,350 tanks and 340 combat aircraft. Watching the disintegration of the Iranian army, he saw an opportunity to attack, using the threat of Islamic Revolution as a pretext. Iraqi military intelligence reported in July 1980 that despite Iran's bellicose rhetoric, "it is clear that, at present, Iran has no power to launch wide offensive operations against Iraq, or to defend on a large scale." Days before the Iraqi invasion and in the midst of rapidly escalating cross-border skirmishes, Iraqi military intelligence again reiterated on 14 September that "the enemy deployment organization does not indicate hostile intentions and appears to be taking on a more defensive mode".

On 8 March 1980, Iran announced it was withdrawing its ambassador from Iraq, downgraded its diplomatic ties to the charge d'affaires level, and demanded that Iraq do the same. The following day, Iraq declared Iran's ambassador persona non grata, and demanded his withdrawal from Iraq by 15 March.

=== Iranian military preparations ===
In Iran, severe officer purges, including numerous executions ordered by Sadegh Khalkhali, the new Revolutionary Court judge, and shortages of spare parts for Iran's American and British-made equipment had crippled Iran's once-mighty military. Between February and September 1979, Iran's government executed 85 senior generals and forced many other generals into early retirement.

By September 1980, some 12,000 officers had been purged from all levels from the army. This reduced the Iranian military's operational capacities.

On the eve of the revolution in 1978, international experts in military science had deemed Iran's armed forces the world's fifth most powerful. However, by the eve of war with Iraq, the recently formidable Iranian army was in many crucial ways a shell of its former self, having been badly weakened by losses in experienced personnel. The desertion rate had reached 60%, the officer corps was devastated and its most highly skilled soldiers and aviators had been exiled, imprisoned, or executed. When the invasion occurred, many pilots and officers were released from prison, or had their executions commuted to combat the Iraqis. Throughout the war, Iran never managed to fully recover from this flight of human capital.

Many junior officers were promoted to generals, resulting in the army being more integrated as a part of the regime by the war's end. Meanwhile, a new paramilitary organisation gained prominence in Iran, the Islamic Revolutionary Guard Corps (IRGC). Created to protect the new regime and serve as a counterbalance to the army, the IRGC had been trained to act only as a militia and struggled to adapt as needed following the Iraqi invasion, initially refusing to fight alongside the regular army, resulting in many defeats. It was not until 1982 that the two groups began carrying out combined operations.

The Basij paramilitary was founded in response to the invasion. They were poorly armed, and had members as young as 12 and as old as 70. Subordinate to the Revolutionary Guard, they made up most of the manpower that was used in the Guard's attacks.

Despite neglect by the new regime, at the war's outset, Iran still had at least 1,000 tanks and several hundred functional aircraft, and could cannibalise equipment to procure spare parts. (Note: A resort that became increasingly necessary as the war continued. Though Iran could and did acquire weapons from multiple foreign manufacturers; the pre-revolution arsenal was composed overwhelmingly of US made weaponry, meaning obtaining additional spare parts was not an option.) Continuous sanctions greatly limited Iran from acquiring many additional heavy weapons, including tanks and aircraft.

=== Iraqi military preparations ===
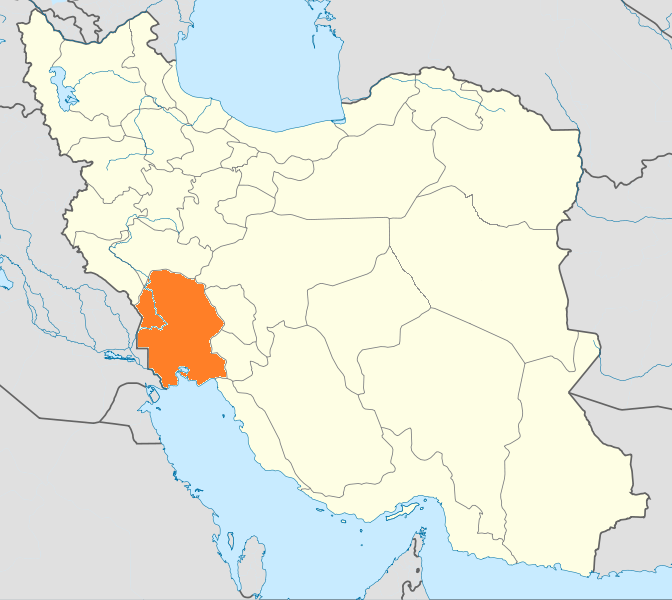
The location of Khuzestan province in Iran, which Iraq planned to annex

In addition, the area around the Shatt al-Arab posed no obstacle for Iraqi river-crossing equipment. Iraq correctly deduced that Iran's defences at the crossing points around the Karkheh and Karoun Rivers were undermanned and that the rivers could be easily crossed. Iraqi intelligence was also informed that the Iranian forces in Khuzestan province, which consisted of two divisions prior to the revolution, now only consisted of several ill-equipped and under-strength battalions with only a handful of operational company-sized tank units.

The only qualms the Iraqis had were over the Iran Air Force. Despite the purge of several key pilots and commanders, as well as the lack of spare parts, the air force showed its power during local uprisings and rebellions. They were also active after the failed U.S. attempt to rescue its hostages, Operation Eagle Claw. Based on these observations, Iraq's leaders decided to carry out a surprise airstrike against the Iranian air force's infrastructure prior to the main invasion.

=== Khuzestan ===
It is believed that Iraq sought to either annex, or establish suzerainty over, Iran's Khuzestan province, but Saddam Hussein publicly denied this in November 1980.

=== Border conflicts leading up to the war ===
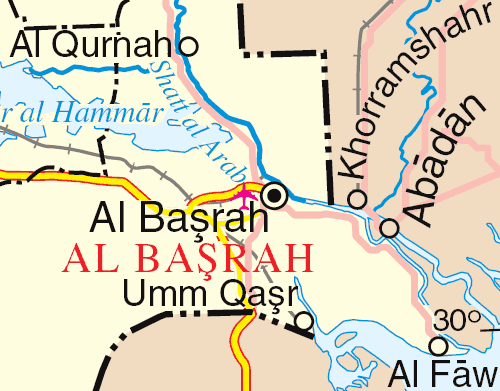
The Shatt al-Arab on the Iran–Iraq border

On 10 September 1980, Iraq forcibly reclaimed territories in Zain al-Qaws and Saif Saad that it had been promised under the terms of the 1975 Algiers Agreement but that Iran had never handed over, leading to both Iran and Iraq voiding the treaty, on 14 and 17 September, respectively. As a result, the only outstanding border dispute between Iran and Iraq at the time of the Iraqi invasion of 22 September was the question of whether Iranian ships would fly Iraqi flags and pay Iraq navigation fees for a stretch of the Shatt al-Arab spanning several miles.

== Course of the war ==
=== 1980: Iraqi invasion ===
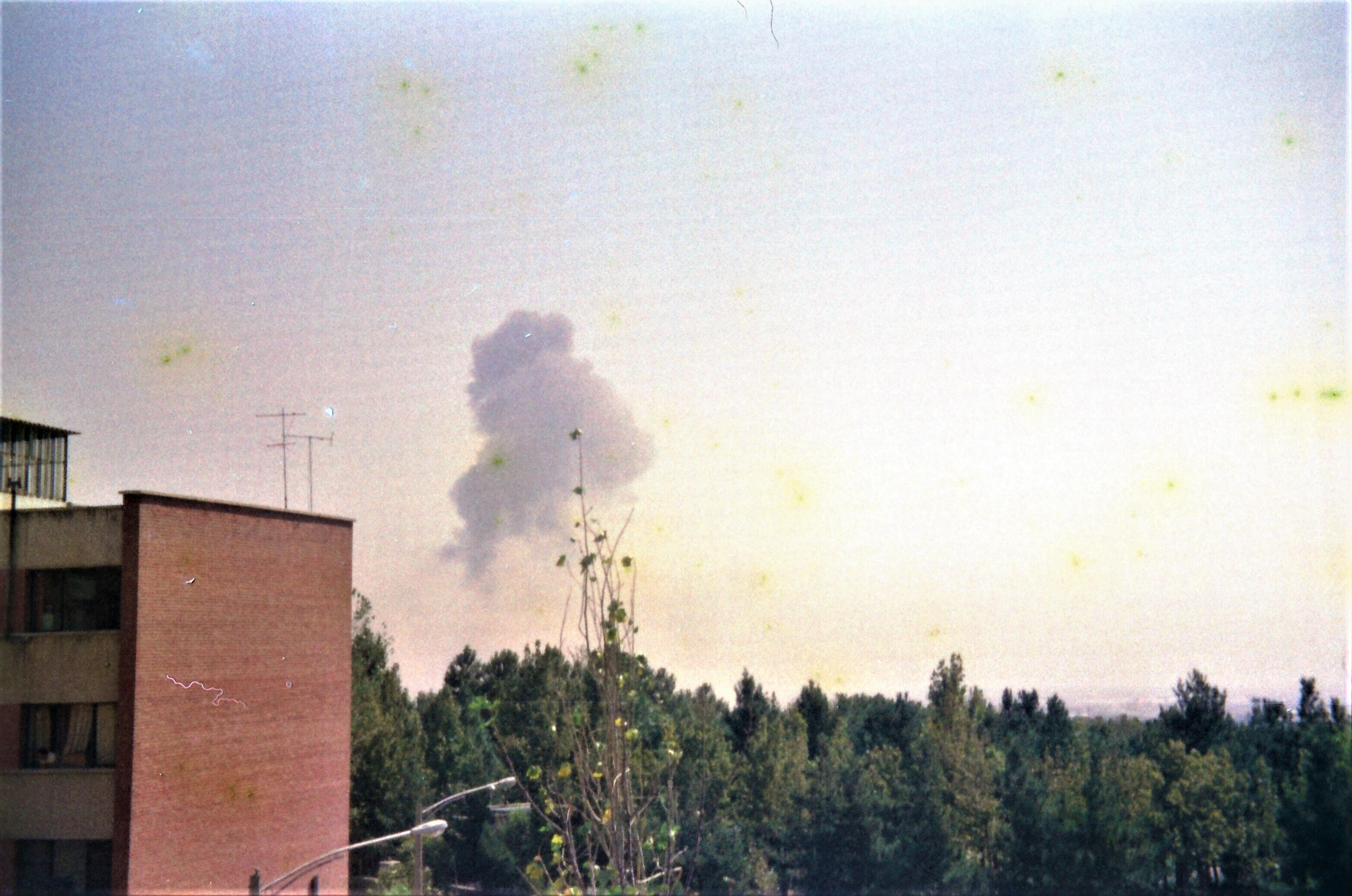
Explosion in Mehrabad Air Base in Tehran after Iraqi forces attacked Tehran on 22 September 1980

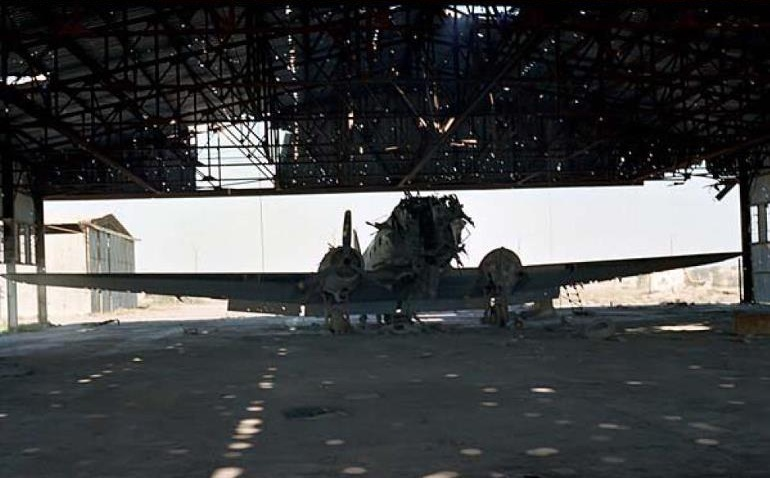
Destroyed Iranian C-47 Skytrain

Iraq launched a full-scale invasion of Iran on 22 September 1980. The Iraqi Air Force launched surprise air strikes on ten Iranian airfields with the objective of destroying the Iranian Air Force. The attack failed to cripple the Iranian Air Force: while it damaged some of Iran's airbase infrastructure, it did not destroy a significant number of aircraft. The Iraqi Air Force was only able to strike in depth with a few aircraft, and Iran had built hardened aircraft shelters where most of its combat aircraft were stored.

The next day, Iraq launched a ground invasion, mounting three simultaneous attacks along a 644 km (400 mi) front. Saddam hoped an attack on Iran would lead to the new government's downfall, or at least end Iran's calls for his overthrow.

Four Iraqi divisions were sent to Khuzestan near the border's southern end, to cut off the Shatt al-Arab from the rest of Iran and to establish a territorial security zone. Two other divisions invaded across the border's north and center to prevent an Iranian counter-attack. Two of the four Iraqi divisions, one mechanised and one armoured, operated near the southern end and besieged the strategically important port cities of Abadan and Khorramshahr.

The two armoured divisions secured the territory bounded by the cities of Khorramshahr, Ahvaz, Susangerd, and Musian. On the central front, the Iraqis occupied Mehran, advanced towards the Zagros Mountains, and were able to block the traditional Tehran–Baghdad invasion route by securing territory forward of Qasr-e Shirin, Iran. On the northern front, the Iraqis attempted to establish a strong defensive position opposite Suleimaniya to protect the Iraqi Kirkuk oil complex. Iraqi hopes of an uprising by the Arabs of Khuzestan failed to materialise, as most of the Arabs remained loyal to Iran.

Patrick Brogan described the Iraqi troops advancing into Iran in 1980 as "badly led and lacking in offensive spirit". The first known chemical weapons attack by Iraq on Iran probably took place during the fighting around Susangerd. Iraqi Minister of Defence Adnan Khayr Allah played a crucial role in rebuilding and modernising the Iraqi military.

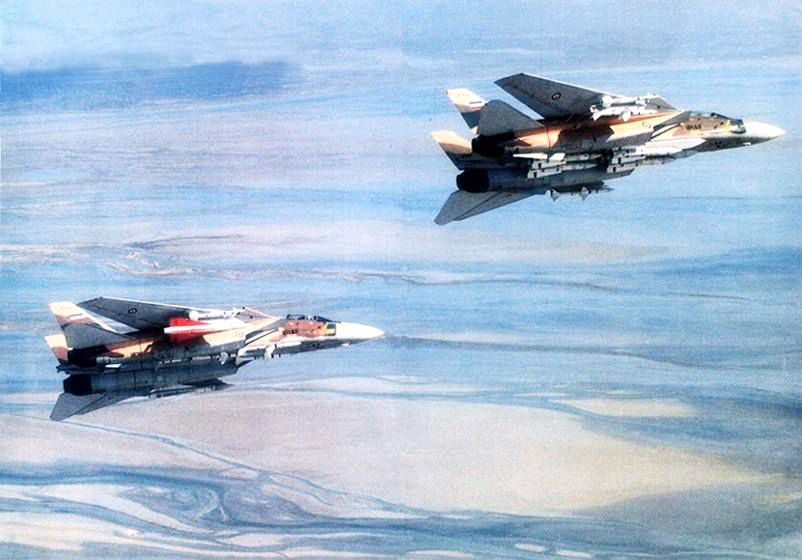
Iranian F-14A Tomcats equipped with AIM-54A, AIM-7 and AIM-9 missiles

Though the Iraqi air invasion surprised the Iranians, their air force retaliated the day after with a large-scale attack against Iraqi air bases and infrastructure in Operation Kaman 99. Groups of fighter jets attacked targets throughout Iraq, such as oil facilities, dams, petrochemical plants, and oil refineries, and included Mosul Airbase, Baghdad, and the Kirkuk oil refinery. Iraq was taken by surprise at the strength of the retaliation, which inflicted heavy losses and economic disruption, but Iraqi air defences also inflicted heavy losses.

Iranian Army Aviation's helicopter gunships and fighter-bombers began attacking the advancing Iraqi divisions; they destroyed numerous armoured vehicles and impeded the Iraqi advance, though not completely halting it. Meanwhile, Iraqi air attacks on Iran were repelled by Iran's fighter jets using missiles, which downed a dozen of Iraq's Soviet-built fighters in the first two days of battle.

The Iranian regular military, police forces, volunteer Basij, and Revolutionary Guards all conducted their operations separately; thus, the Iraqi invading forces did not face coordinated resistance. However, on 24 September, the Iranian Navy attacked Basra, Iraq, destroying two oil terminals near the port of al-Faw, thus reducing Iraq's ability to export oil. The Iranian ground forces, primarily consisting of the Revolutionary Guard, retreated to the cities, where they set up defences against the invaders.

On 30 September, Iran's air force launched Operation Scorch Sword, damaging the nearly-complete Osirak nuclear reactor near Baghdad. By 1 October, Baghdad had been subjected to eight air attacks. In response, Iraq launched aerial strikes against Iranian targets.

The mountainous border between Iran and Iraq made a deep ground invasion almost impossible, and air strikes were used instead. The invasion's first waves were a series of air strikes targeted at Iranian airfields. Iraq also attempted to bomb Tehran, Iran's capital, into submission.

=== First Battle of Khorramshahr ===
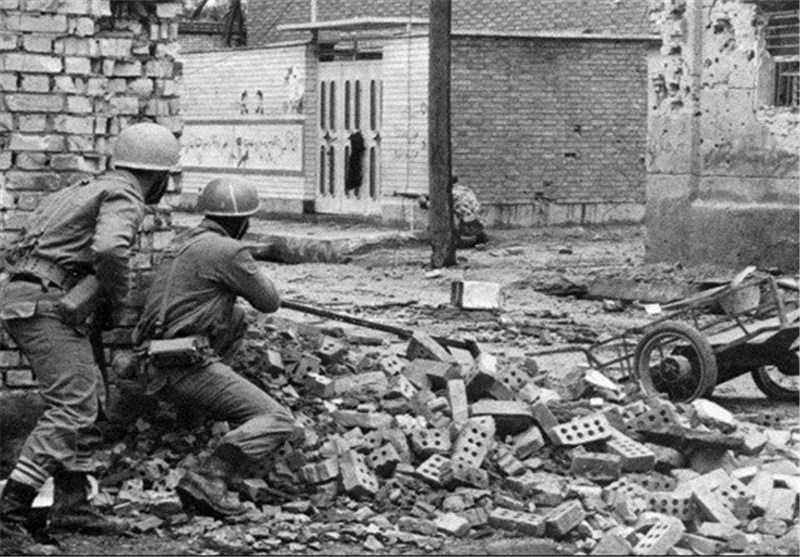
Resistance of the outnumbered and outgunned Iranians in Khorramshahr slowed the Iraqis for a month.

On 22 September, a prolonged battle began in the city of Khorramshahr, eventually leaving around 7,000 dead on each side. The battle began with Iraqi air raids against key points and mechanised divisions advancing on the city in a crescent-like formation. They were slowed by Iranian air attacks and Revolutionary Guard troops. The Iranians flooded the marsh areas around the city, forcing the Iraqis to traverse through narrow strips of land. Iraqi tanks launched attacks with no infantry support, and many tanks were lost to Iranian anti-tank teams.

By 30 September, the Iraqis had managed to clear the Iranians from the outskirts of the city. The next day, the Iraqis launched infantry and armoured attacks into the city. The Iraqis were repelled. On 14 October, the Iraqis launched a second offensive. The Iranians initiated a withdrawal from the city. By 24 October, most of the city was captured, and the Iranians evacuated across the Karun River. Some partisans continued fighting until November.

=== Iraqi advance stalls ===
Fighting during the Siege of Abadan

Though Khorramshahr was captured, the battle had delayed the Iraqis enough to allow the large-scale deployment of the Iranian military. In November, Saddam ordered his forces to advance towards and besiege Dezful and Ahvaz. However, the Iraqi offensive had been badly damaged by Iranian militias and air power. Iran's air force had destroyed Iraq's army supply depots and fuel supplies, and was strangling Iraq through an aerial siege.

Iran's supplies had not been exhausted, despite sanctions, and the military often cannibalised spare parts from other equipment and began searching for parts on the black market. On 28 November, Iran launched Operation Morvarid, an air and sea attack which destroyed 80% of Iraq's navy, and all of the radar sites in the southern portion of the country. When Iraq laid siege to Abadan, it could not blockade the port or prevent seaborne resupply.

Iraq's strategic reserves had been depleted, preventing major offensives for years. On 7 December, Saddam announced that Iraq was going on the defensive. By the end of 1980, Iraq had destroyed and captured numerous Iranian tanks.

=== 1981: Stalemate ===
For the next eight months, both sides were on a defensive footing, with the exception of the Battle of Dezful, as the Iranians needed more time to reorganise their forces after the damage inflicted by the purge of 1979–80. During this period, fighting consisted mainly of artillery duels and raids. Iraq had mobilised 21 divisions for the invasion, while Iran countered with only 13 regular army divisions and one brigade. Seven divisions were deployed to the border. The war bogged down into trench warfare. Due to the power of anti-tank weapons, armoured manoeuvre by the Iraqis was very costly, and they consequently entrenched their tanks into static positions.

Iraq also began firing missiles into Dezful and Ahvaz, and used terror bombing to bring the war to the Iranian civilian population. Iran launched dozens of "human wave assaults".

==== Battle of Dezful ====
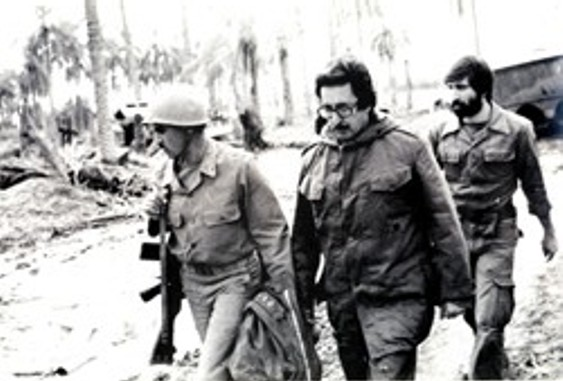
Iranian president Abulhassan Banisadr during a visit to the frontlines

On 5 January 1981, Iran had reorganised its forces enough to launch a large-scale offensive, Operation Nasr. The Iranians launched their major armoured offensive from Dezful in the direction of Susangerd, consisting of tank brigades, and broke through Iraqi lines. However, the Iranian tanks had raced through Iraqi lines with unguarded flanks and without infantry support; as a result, they were cut off by Iraqi tanks.

In the ensuing Battle of Dezful, the Iranian armoured divisions were nearly wiped out in one of the biggest tank battles of the war. When the Iranian tanks tried to manoeuvre, they became stuck in the mud of the marshes, and many tanks were abandoned. The Iraqis lost around 45 tanks, and the Iranians, around 100–200. 141 Iranians were killed.

The battle had been ordered by Iranian president Abulhassan Banisadr, who was hoping that a victory might shore up his deteriorating political position; the failure hastened his fall. Many of Iran's problems took place because of political infighting between Banisadr, who supported the regular army, and the hardliners, who supported the IRGC. Once he was impeached and the competition ended, the performance of the Iranian military improved.

The Islamic Republic government in Iran was further distracted by internal fighting between the regime and the Mujahedin e-Khalq (MEK) on the streets of Iran's major cities in June 1981 and again in September. In 1983, the MEK started an alliance with Iraq following a meeting between MEK leader Massoud Rajavi and Iraqi Deputy Prime minister Tariq Aziz.

In 1984, Banisadr left the coalition because of a dispute, and set up a base on the Iranian border.

==== Attack on H3 ====
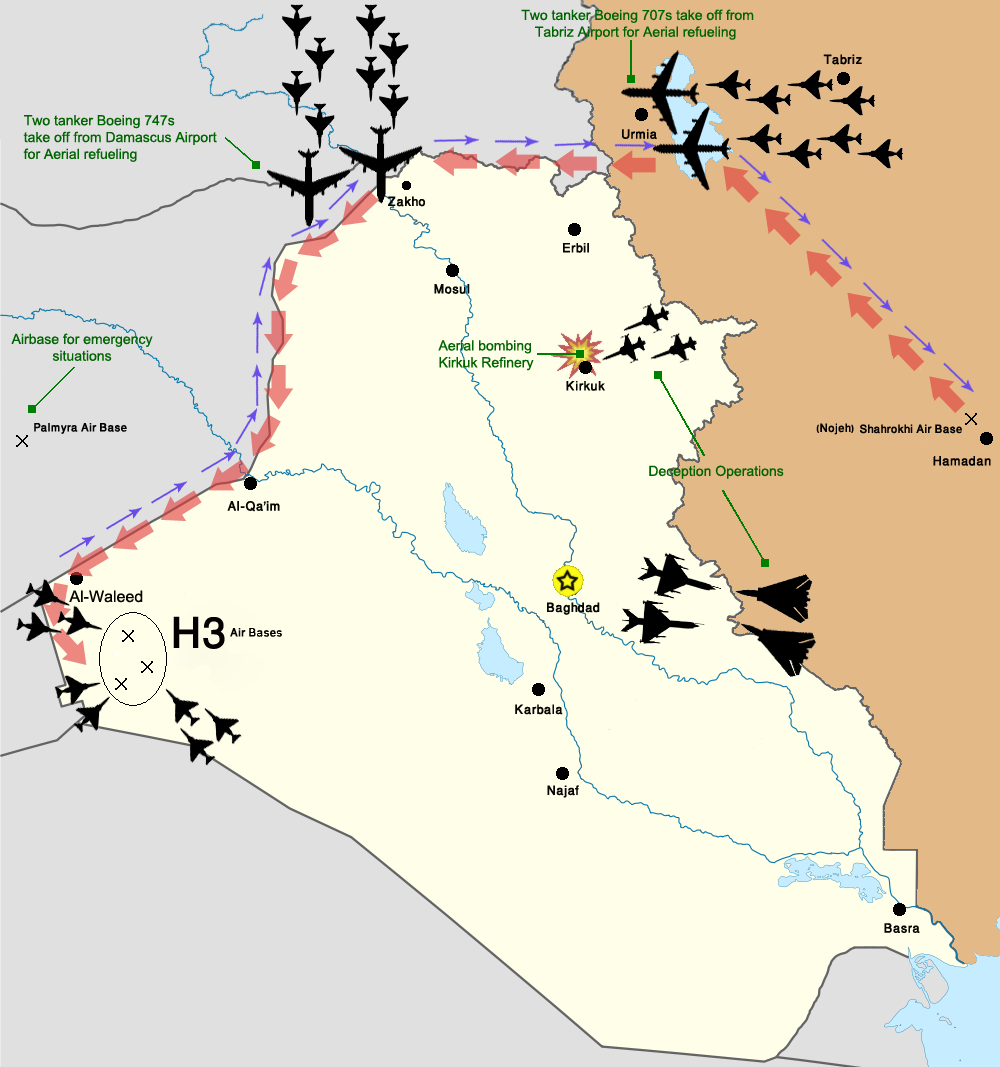
The surprise attack on H-3 airbase is considered to be one of the most sophisticated air operations of the war.

The Iraqi Air Force, badly damaged by the Iranians, was moved to the H-3 Air Base in western Iraq, near the Jordanian border and away from Iran. On 3 April 1981, the Iranian Air Force launched a surprise attack on H3, destroying Iraqi combat aircraft.

Despite it and other successful air attacks, the Iranian Air Force was forced to cancel its successful 180-day air offensive and abandoned their attempted control of Iraqi airspace. They had been seriously weakened by sanctions and pre-war purges and further damaged by a fresh purge after the impeachment crisis of President Banisadr. The Iranian Air Force could not survive further attrition, and decided to limit their losses, abandoning efforts to control Iraqi airspace. The Iranian air force would henceforth fight on the defensive, trying to deter the Iraqis rather than engaging them. While throughout 1981–1982 the Iraqi air force would remain weak, within the next few years they would rearm and expand again, and begin to regain the strategic initiative.

==== Dispute over use of human wave attacks ====
Various sources claim that because Iran lacked heavy weapons, but had numerous volunteers, they began using human wave attacks against the Iraqis. Typically, an Iranian assault would commence with poorly trained Basij who would launch the primary human wave assaults to swamp the weakest portions of the Iraqi lines en masse (on some occasions even bodily clearing minefields). This would be followed up by the more experienced Revolutionary Guard infantry, who would breach the weakened Iraqi lines, and followed up by the regular army using mechanised forces, who would manoeuvre through the breach and attempt to encircle and defeat the enemy.

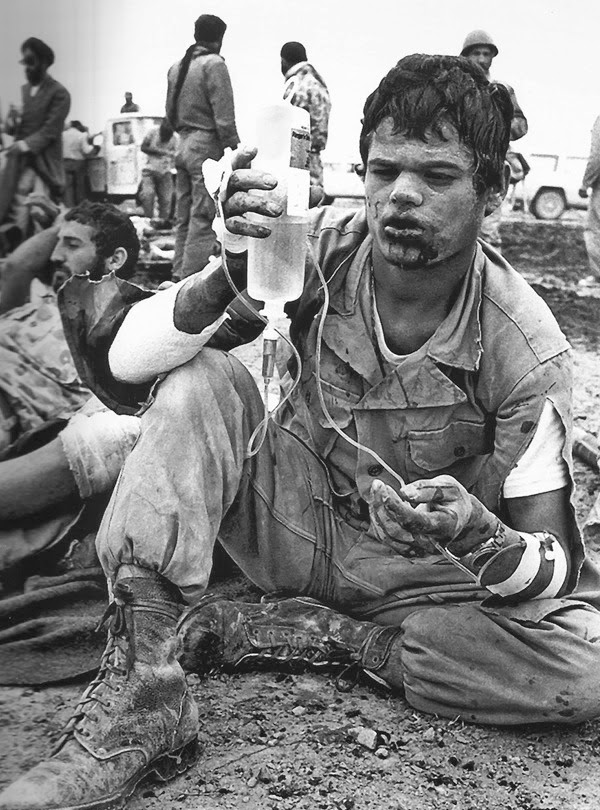
A wounded Iranian soldier holding an IV bag

Historian Stephen Pelletiere writes that the use of "human wave attacks" is a misconception. Instead, Iranian tactics consisted of using groups of 22-man infantry squads, which moved forward to attack specific objectives. As the squads surged forward to execute their missions, that gave the impression of a "human wave attack". Nevertheless, the idea of "human wave attacks" remained virtually synonymous with any large-scale infantry frontal assault Iran carried out. Large numbers of troops would be used, aimed at overwhelming the Iraqi lines (usually the weakest portion, typically manned by the Iraqi Popular Army), regardless of losses.

Former Iraqi general Ra'ad al-Hamdani said the Iranian human wave charges consisted of armed "civilians" who carried most of their necessary equipment themselves into battle and often lacked command and control and logistics. Operations were often carried out during the night and deception operations, infiltrations, and manoeuvres became more common. Infiltrating forces would be reinforced to maintain momentum, all forces would be concentrated onto a newly discovered weak point, and human wave attacks were used to facilitate breakthroughs.

Human wave attacks, while killing tens of thousands of troops, caused major Iraqi losses. As the Iraqis would dig in their tanks and infantry into static, entrenched positions, the Iranians would manage to break through the lines and encircle entire divisions. Merely the fact that the Iranian forces used manoeuvre warfare by their light infantry against static Iraqi defenses was often the decisive factor in battle. However, lack of coordination between the Iranian Army and IRGC and shortages of heavy weaponry played a detrimental role, often with most of the infantry not being supported by artillery and armour.

==== Operation Eighth-Imam ====
After the Iraqi offensive stalled in March 1981, there was little change in the front other than Iran retaking the high ground above Susangerd in May. By late 1981, Iran returned to the offensive and launched Operation Samen-ol-A'emeh, ending the Iraqi Siege of Abadan in September. The Iranians used a combined force of regular artillery with small groups of armour, supported by Pasdaran (IRGC) and Basij infantry. In October, after lifting the siege, a large Iranian convoy was ambushed by Iraqi tanks, and during the ensuing battle, Iran lost many armoured vehicles, and withdrew from the previously gained territory.

==== Operation Tariq al-Quds ====
On 29 November 1981, Iran began Operation Tariq al-Quds with three army brigades and seven Revolutionary Guard brigades. The Iraqis failed to properly patrol their occupied areas, and the Iranians constructed a road through the unguarded sand dunes, launching their attack from the Iraqi rear. The town of Bostan was retaken from Iraqi divisions by 7 December. By this time the Iraqi Army was experiencing serious morale problems, compounded by the fact that Operation Tariq al-Quds marked the first use of Iranian "human wave" tactics, where the Revolutionary Guard light infantry repeatedly charged at Iraqi positions, oftentimes without armour or air power. The fall of Bostan exacerbated the Iraqis' logistical problems, forcing them to use a roundabout route from Ahvaz to the south to resupply their troops. 6,000 Iranians and over 2,000 Iraqis were killed in the operation.

=== 1982: Iraqi retreat, Iranian offensive ===
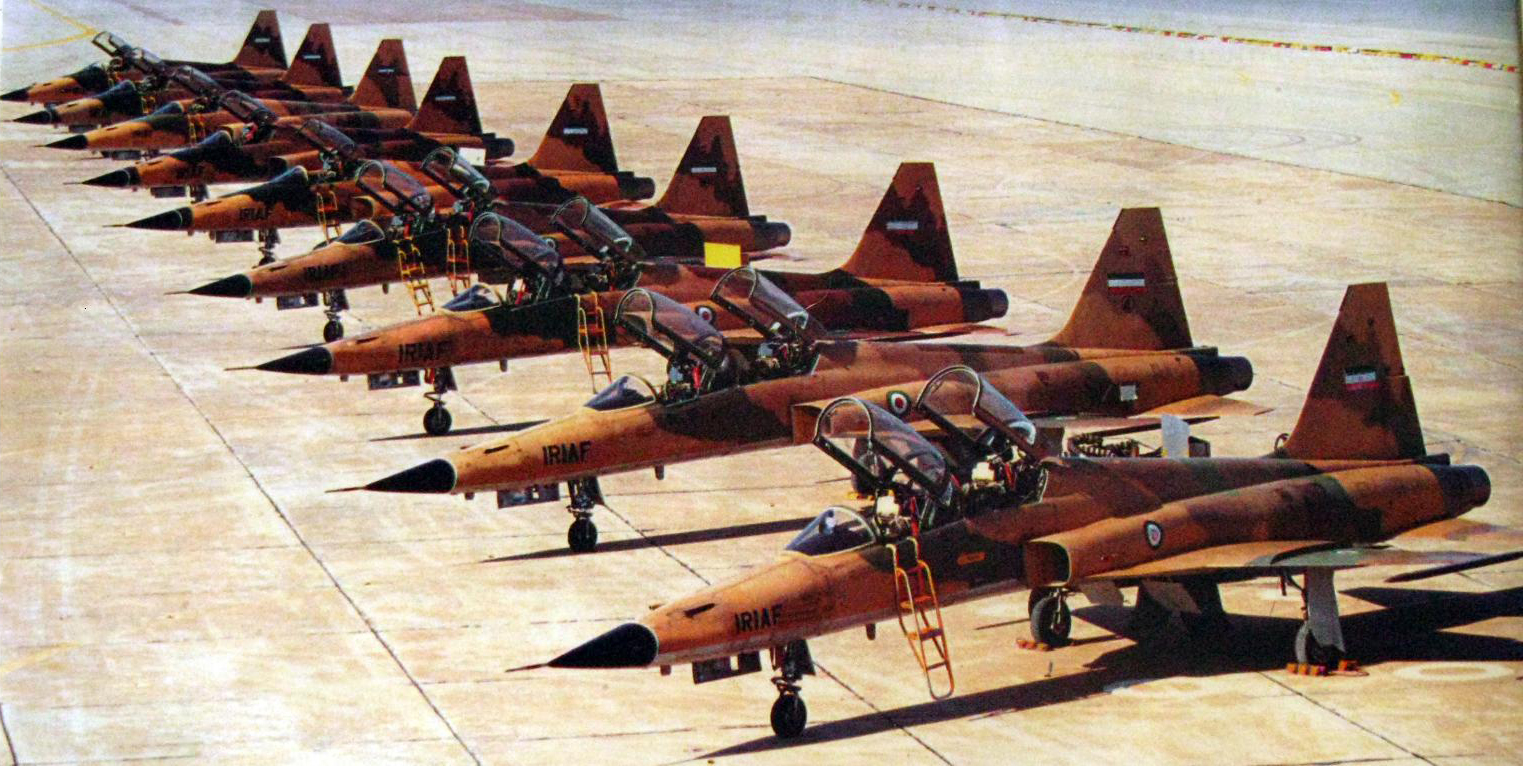
Iranian Northrop F-5 aircraft during the war

The Iraqis, realising that the Iranians were planning to attack, decided to preempt them with Operation al-Fawz al-'Azim (Supreme Success) on 19 March. Using a large number of tanks, helicopters, and fighter jets, they attacked the Iranian buildup around the Roghabiyeh pass. Though Saddam and his generals assumed they had succeeded, in reality the Iranian forces remained fully intact. The Iranians had concentrated much of their forces by bringing them directly from the cities and towns throughout Iran via trains, buses, and private cars. The concentration of forces did not resemble a traditional military buildup, and although the Iraqis detected a population buildup near the front, they failed to realise that this was an attacking force. As a result, Saddam's army was unprepared for the Iranian offensives to come.

==== Operation Fath ol-Mobin ====
Iran's next major offensive was Operation Fath ol-Mobin, in March 1982. Iran launched an attack which took the Iraqi forces by surprise: Iranian helicopters landed behind Iraqi lines, silenced their artillery, and captured an Iraqi headquarters. The Revolutionary Guard and regular army followed up by surrounding the Iraqis that had camped close to the Iranian town of Shush. The Iraqis counterattacked, breaking the encirclement and rescuing the surrounded divisions. Iraqi tanks came under attack by Iranian fighter jets. Iraqi forces were driven away from Shush, Dezful and Ahvaz, and the Iranians destroyed numerous Iraqi tanks and armoured vehicles. By this time, most of the Khuzestan province had been recaptured.

==== Operation Beit ol-Moqaddas ====
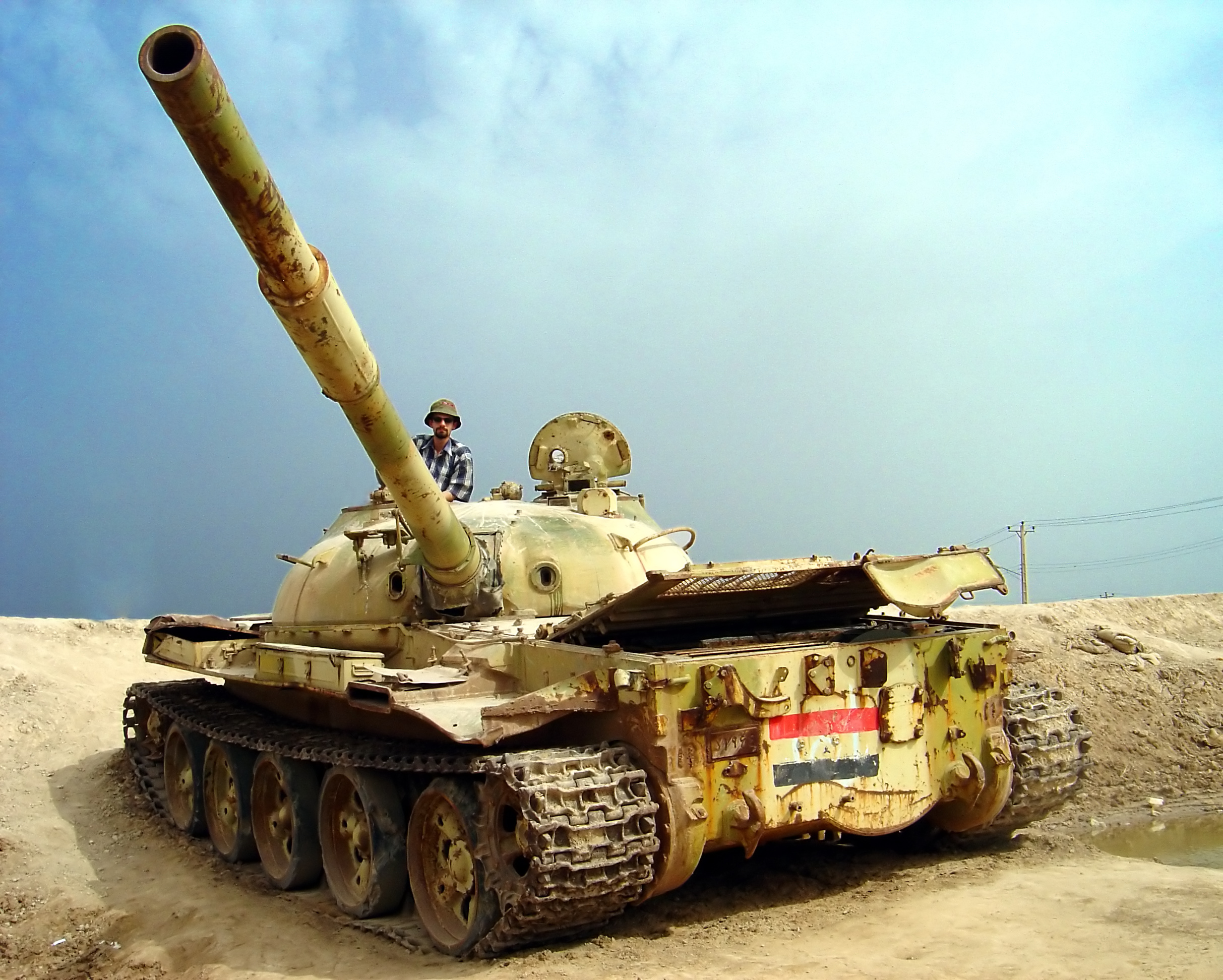
Iraqi T-62 tank wreckage in Khuzestan province, Iran

In preparation for Operation Beit ol-Moqaddas, the Iranians had launched numerous air raids against Iraqi air bases, destroying 47 jets (including Iraq's brand new Mirage F-1 fighter jets from France) and gaining air superiority and the ability to monitor Iraqi troop movements.

In April, Iran launched the offensive. 70,000 Revolutionary Guard and Basij members struck on several axes—Bostan, Susangerd, the west bank of the Karun River, and Ahvaz. Basij human wave attacks were followed up by the regular army and Revolutionary Guard support. The Iraqi forces retreated, and within a month, Iran had driven out all Iraqi forces from the Susangerd area. The Iranians captured several thousand Iraqi troops and numerous tanks.

The Iraqis retreated to the Karun River, with only Khorramshahr and a few outlying areas remaining in their possession. Saddam ordered 70,000 troops to be placed around Khorramshahr. The Iraqis created a hastily constructed defence line around the city and outlying areas, such as metal spikes to discourage airborne commando landings. However, Khorramshahr's only resupply point was across the Shatt al-Arab, and the Iranian air force began bombing the supply bridges to the city, while their artillery zeroed in on the besieged garrison.

===== Second Battle of Khorramshahr =====
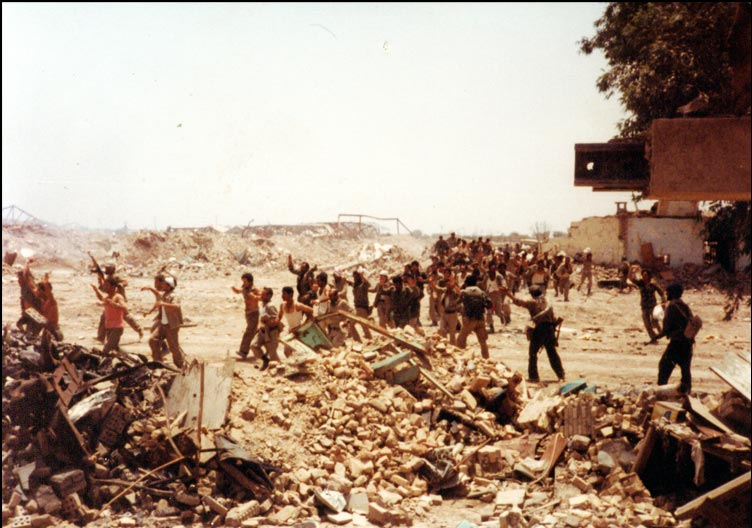
Iraqi soldiers surrendering after the Liberation of Khorramshahr

In the early morning hours of 23 May 1982, the Iranians began the drive towards Khorramshahr across the Karun River. This part of Operation Beit ol-Moqaddas was spearheaded by the 77th Khorasan division with tanks along with the Revolutionary Guard and Basij. The Iranians hit the Iraqis with destructive air strikes and massive artillery barrages, crossed the Karun River, captured bridgeheads, and launched human wave attacks towards the city. Saddam's defensive barricade collapsed; in less than 48 hours of fighting, the city fell and 19,000 Iraqis surrendered to the Iranians. A total of 10,000 Iraqis were killed or wounded in Khorramshahr, while the Iranians suffered 30,000 casualties. During the whole of Operation Beit ol-Moqaddas, 33,000 Iraqi soldiers were captured by the Iranians.

==== State of Iraqi armed forces ====
The fighting had battered the Iraqi military: its strength fell from 210,000 to 150,000 troops; over 20,000 Iraqi soldiers were killed and over 30,000 captured; two out of four active armoured divisions and at least three mechanised divisions fell to less than a brigade's strength; and the Iranians had captured over 450 tanks and armoured personnel carriers.

The Iraqi Air Force was also left in poor shape: after losing up to 55 aircraft since early December 1981, they had only 100 intact fighter-bombers and interceptors. Only three squadrons of fighter-bombers capable of operations inside Iran. The Iraqi Army Air Corps was in slightly better shape, and could still operate more than 70 helicopters. Despite this, the Iraqis still held 3,000 tanks, while Iran held 1,000.

At this point, Saddam believed that his army was too demoralised and damaged to hold onto Khuzestan and major swathes of Iranian territory, and withdrew his remaining forces, redeploying them in defence along the border. However, his troops continued to occupy some key Iranian border areas of Iran, including the disputed territories that prompted his invasion, notably the Shatt al-Arab. In response to their failures against the Iranians in Khorramshahr, Saddam ordered executions of more than a dozen high-ranking officers. This became an increasingly common punishment for those who failed him in battle.

=== Early international response ===
In April 1982, Iran's ally Syria closed the Kirkuk–Baniyas pipeline that had allowed Iraqi oil to reach tankers on the Mediterranean, reducing the Iraqi budget by $5 billion per month. Journalist Patrick Brogan wrote, "It appeared for a while that Iraq would be strangled economically before it was defeated militarily." Syria's closure of the Kirkuk–Baniyas pipeline left Iraq with the pipeline to Turkey as the only means of exporting oil, along with transporting oil by tanker truck to the port of Aqaba in Jordan.

The Turkish pipeline's capacity was insufficient to pay for the war. Saudi Arabia, Kuwait, and the other Gulf states saved Iraq from bankruptcy by providing it with $37–60 billion in loans. Though Iraq had previously been hostile towards other Gulf states, they feared Iranian ideology more than Iraq. Notably, Khomeini had declared monarchies an illegitimate and un-Islamic form of government. Khomeini's statement was widely received as a call to overthrow the Gulf monarchies. Journalists John Bulloch and Harvey Morris wrote:

The virulent Iranian campaign, which at its peak seemed to be making the overthrow of the Saudi regime a war aim on a par with the defeat of Iraq, did have an effect on [Saudi Arabia], but not the one the Iranians wanted: instead of becoming more conciliatory, the Saudis became tougher, more self-confident, and less prone to seek compromise.

Saudi Arabia was said to provide Iraq with $1 billion per month starting in mid-1982.

Saddam started being aided by the U.S., including massive loans, political influence, and intelligence on Iranian deployments gathered by American spy satellites. Iraq relied heavily on American satellite and radar intelligence to detect and counter Iranian troop movements.

With Iranian success on the battlefield, the U.S. increased its support of the Iraqi government, supplying intelligence, economic aid, and dual-use equipment and vehicles, as well as normalising relations (which had been broken during the 1967 Six-Day War). In June 1982, U.S. president Ronald Reagan signed a directive which determined that the U.S. "would do whatever was necessary to prevent Iraq from losing".

In 1982, Reagan removed Iraq from the list of countries "supporting terrorism" and sold weapons such as howitzers to Iraq via Jordan. France sold Iraq millions of dollars' worth of weapons. Both the United States and West Germany sold Iraq dual-use pesticides and poisons that would be used to create chemical weapons.

Iran lacked funds for comparable purchases. They counted on China, North Korea, Libya, Syria, and Japan for supplying anything from weapons and munitions to logistical and engineering equipment.

==== Ceasefire proposal ====
On 20 June 1982, Saddam announced that he wanted to sue for peace and proposed an immediate ceasefire and withdrawal from Iranian territory within two weeks. Khomeini responded by saying the war would not end until a new government was installed in Iraq and reparations paid. He proclaimed that Iran would invade Iraq and would not stop until the Ba'ath regime was replaced by an Islamic republic. Iran supported a government in exile for Iraq, the Supreme Council of the Islamic Revolution in Iraq, led by exiled Iraqi cleric Mohammad Baqer al-Hakim, which was dedicated to overthrowing the Ba'ath party. They recruited POWs, dissidents, exiles, and Shias to join the Badr Brigade, the military wing of the organisation.

The decision to invade Iraq was taken after much debate within the Iranian government. One faction, including Prime Minister Mir-Hossein Mousavi and President Ali Khamenei, wanted to accept the ceasefire, as most of Iranian soil had been recaptured. Some were opposed to the invasion of Iraq on logistical grounds. The opposing view was a hardline faction led by the clerics on the Supreme Defence Council, whose leader was Akbar Rafsanjani.

Iran also hoped that its attacks would ignite a revolt against Saddam's rule by the Shia and Kurdish population of Iraq, possibly resulting in his downfall. It was successful in doing so with the Kurdish population, but not the Shia. Iran had captured large quantities of Iraqi equipment, enough to create several tank battalions.

At a cabinet meeting in Baghdad, Minister of Health Riyadh Hussein suggested that Saddam could step down temporarily as a way of easing Iran towards a ceasefire, and then afterwards would come back to power. Saddam, annoyed, asked if anyone else in the Cabinet agreed with the Health Minister's idea. When no one raised their hand in support, he escorted Riyadh to the next room, then shot him.

=== Iran invades Iraq and Iraqi tactics in response ===
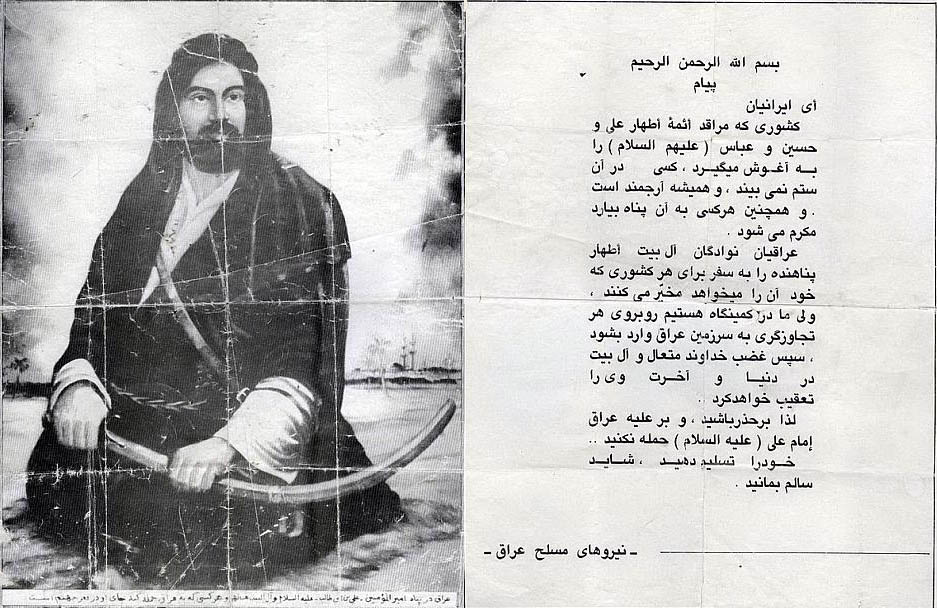
An admonitory declaration issued from the Iraqi government in order to warn Iranian troops in the Iran–Iraq War. The statement says: "Hey Iranians! No one has been downtrodden in the country where Ali ibn Abi Ṭālib, Husayn ibn Ali and Abbas ibn Ali are buried. Iraq has undoubtedly been an honourable country. All refugees are precious. Anyone who wants to live in exile can choose Iraq freely. We, the Sons of Iraq, have been ambushing foreign aggressors. The enemies who plan to assault Iraq will be disfavoured by God in this world and the hereafter. Be careful of attacking Iraq and Ali ibn Abi Ṭālib! If you surrender, you might be in peace."

For the most part, Iraq remained on the defensive for the next five years, unable and unwilling to launch any major offensives, while Iran launched more than 70 offensives. Iraq's strategy changed from holding territory in Iran to denying Iran any major gains in Iraq, as well as holding onto disputed territories along the border. Saddam began a policy of total war, gearing most of his country towards defending against Iran. By 1988, Iraq was spending 40–75% of its GDP on military equipment. Saddam had also more than doubled the size of the Iraqi army, from 200,000 soldiers to 500,000. Iraq also began launching air raids against Iranian border cities.

By the end of 1982, Iraq had been resupplied with new Soviet and Chinese materiel, and the ground war entered a new phase. Iraq used newly acquired tanks, as well as Chinese copies, truck-mounted rocket launchers, and helicopter gunships to prepare a Soviet-type three-line defence, replete with obstacles such as barbed wire, minefields, and bunkers. The Combat Engineer Corps built bridges across water obstacles, laid minefields, erected earthen revetments, dug trenches, built machine gun nests, and prepared new defence lines and fortifications.

Iraq began to focus on using defence in depth to defeat the Iranians through sheer size. Large Iranian human-wave attacks would overrun Iraq's forward entrenched infantry defences, forcing Iraqi retreats, but their static defences would bleed the Iranians and channel them into certain directions, drawing them into traps or pockets. Iraqi air and artillery attacks would then pin the Iranians down and expose them to counterattacks by tanks and mechanised infantry.

Sometimes, the Iraqis would launch "probing attacks" into the Iranian lines to provoke rapid responses. While Iranian human wave attacks were successful against the dug-in Iraqi forces in Khuzestan, they had trouble breaking through Iraq's defence in depth lines. Iraq had a logistical advantage in their defence: the front was located near the main Iraqi bases and arms depots, allowing their army to be efficiently supplied. By contrast, the front in Iran was far away from the main Iranian bases and arms depots, and as such, Iranian troops and supplies had to travel through mountain ranges to reach the front.

Iran's military power was weakened once again by large purges in 1982, resulting from another supposedly attempted coup.

==== Final operations of 1982 ====
After Iran's failure in Operation Ramadan, Iran launched two small offensives aimed at reclaiming the Sumar Hills, and isolating the Iraqi pocket at Naft Shahr at the international border, both of which were part of the disputed territories still under Iraqi occupation. They then aimed to capture the Iraqi border town of Mandali. They planned to take the Iraqis by surprise, then stretch their defences, and possibly break through them to open a road to Baghdad for future exploitation.

During Operation Muslim ibn Aqil in October, Iran recovered some of its disputed territory near the international border, and reached the outskirts of Mandali before being stopped by Iraqi attacks. During Operation Muharram in November, Iran captured part of the Bayat oilfield with fighter jets and helicopters, destroying Iraqi combat machinery with few losses. They nearly breached the Iraqi lines but failed to capture Mandali after the Iraqis sent reinforcements, including new tanks, with anti-missile armour. The Iranian advance was also impeded by heavy rains. 3,500 Iraqis and an unknown number of Iranians died, with only minor gains for Iran.

=== 1983–84: Stalemate and war of attrition ===
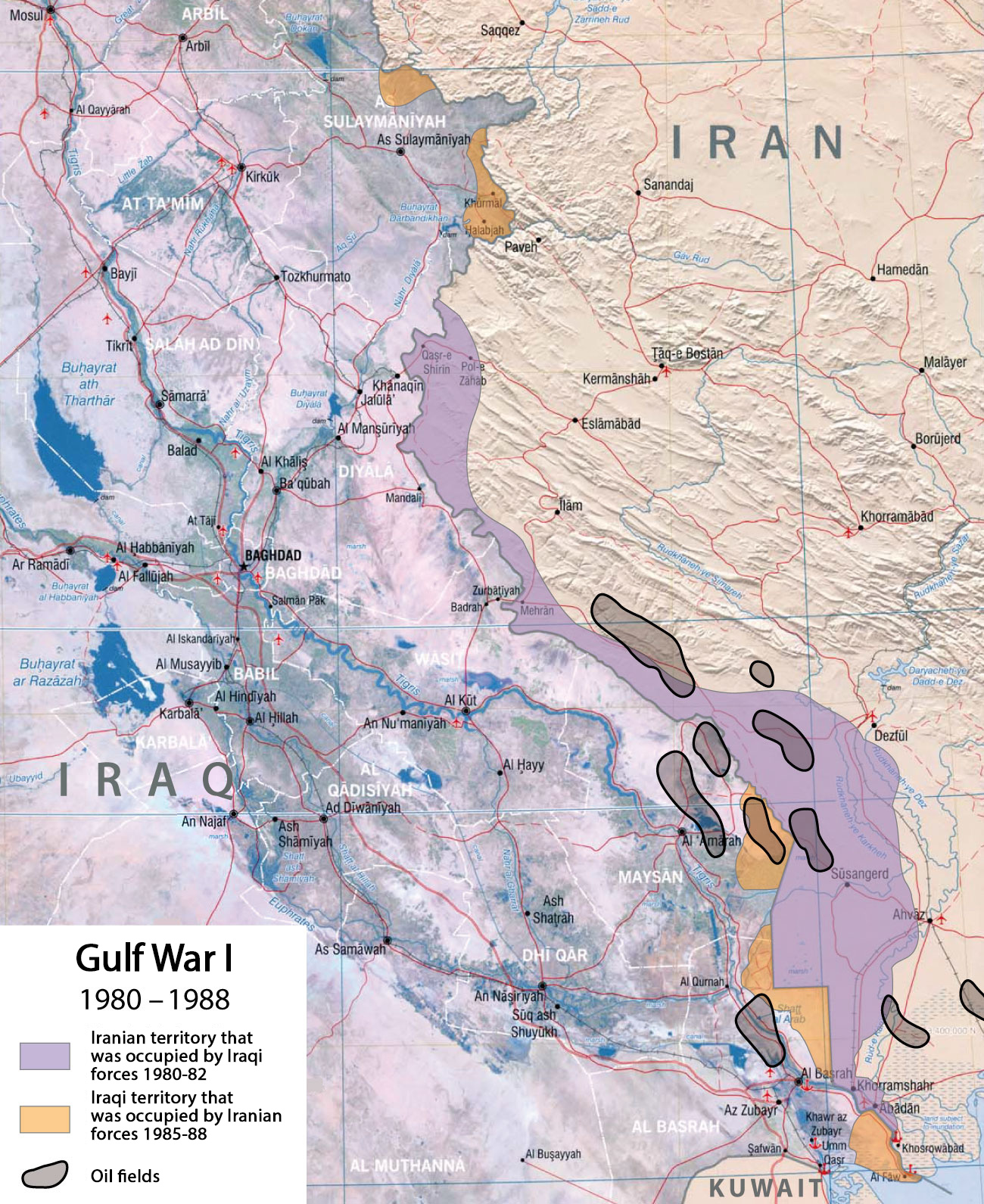
The furthest ground gains made by both sides during the war

After the failure of the 1982 summer offensives, Iran believed that a major effort along the entire breadth of the front would yield victory. In 1983, the Iranians launched five major assaults along the front. None achieved substantial success, as the Iranians staged more massive "human wave" attacks. By this time, it was estimated that no more than 70 Iranian fighter aircraft were still operational at any given time. Iran had its own helicopter repair facilities, left over from before the revolution, and often used helicopters for close air support.

Iranian fighter pilots had superior training compared to their Iraqi counterparts, as most had received training from U.S. officers before the 1979 revolution, and continued to dominate in combat. However, aircraft shortages, the size of defended territory/airspace, and American intelligence supplied to Iraq allowed the Iraqis to exploit gaps in Iranian airspace. Iraqi air campaigns met little opposition, striking over half of Iran, as the Iraqis were able to gain air superiority towards the end of the war.

==== Operation Before the Dawn ====
In Operation Before the Dawn, launched in February 1983, the Iranians shifted focus from the southern to the central and northern sectors. Employing 200,000 Revolutionary Guardsmen, Iran attacked near Amarah, Iraq, southeast of Baghdad, in an attempt to reach the highways connecting northern and southern Iraq. The attack was stalled by hilly escarpments, forests, and river torrents across the way to Amarah, but the Iraqis could not force the Iranians back. Iran directed artillery on Basra, Amarah, and Mandali.

The Iranians suffered a large number of casualties clearing minefields and breaching Iraqi anti-tank mines, which Iraqi engineers were unable to replace. After this battle, Iran reduced its use of human wave attacks, though they still remained a key tactic as the war went on.

Further Iranian attacks were mounted in the Mandali–Baghdad north-central sector in April 1983, but were repelled by Iraqi mechanised and infantry divisions. Casualties were high, and by the end of 1983, an estimated 120,000 Iranians and 60,000 Iraqis had been killed. Iran held the advantage in the war of attrition. In 1983, Iran had an estimated population of 43.6 million to Iraq's 14.8 million, and the discrepancy continued to grow throughout the war.

==== Dawn Operations ====
From early 1983–1984, Iran launched a series of four Valfajr (Dawn) Operations, that eventually numbered to 10. During Operation Dawn-1, in early February 1983, 50,000 Iranian forces attacked westward from Dezful and were confronted by 55,000 Iraqi forces. The Iranian objective was to cut off the road from Basra to Baghdad in the central sector. The Iraqis carried out 150 air sorties against the Iranians, and even bombed Dezful, Ahvaz, and Khorramshahr in retribution. The Iraqi counterattack was broken up by Iran's 92nd Armoured Division.

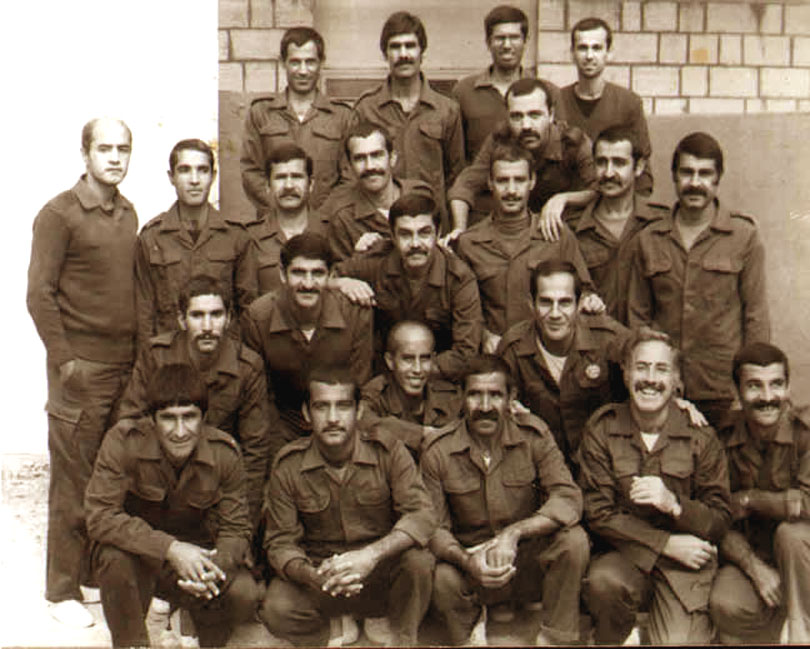
Iranian POWs in 1983 near Tikrit, Iraq

During Operation Dawn 2, the Iranians directed insurgency operations by proxy in April 1983 by supporting the Kurds in the north. With Kurdish support, the Iranians attacked on 23 July 1983, capturing the Iraqi town of Haj Omran and maintaining it against an Iraqi poison gas counteroffensive. This operation incited Iraq to later conduct indiscriminate chemical attacks against the Kurds. The Iranians attempted to further exploit activities in the north on 30 July 1983, during Operation Dawn 3. Iran saw an opportunity to sweep away Iraqi forces controlling the roads between the Iranian mountain border towns of Mehran, Dehloran and Elam. Iraq launched airstrikes, and equipped attack helicopters with chemical warheads. While ineffective, it demonstrated both the Iraqi general staff's and Saddam's increasing interest in using chemical weapons. In the end, 17,000 had been killed on both sides, with no gain for either country.

The focus of Operation Dawn 4 in September 1983 was the northern sector in Iranian Kurdistan. Three Iranian regular divisions, the Revolutionary Guard, and Kurdistan Democratic Party (KDP) elements amassed in Marivan and Sardasht in a move to threaten the major Iraqi city Suleimaniyah. Iran's strategy was to press Kurdish tribes to occupy the Banjuin Valley, which was near Suleimaniyah and the oilfields of Kirkuk. To stem the tide, Iraq deployed Mi-8 attack helicopters equipped with chemical weapons and executed 120 sorties against the Iranian force, which stopped them 15 km (9.3 mi) into Iraqi territory.

5,000 Iranians and 2,500 Iraqis died. Iran gained some of its former territory, as well as some Iraqi land, and captured 1,800 Iraqi prisoners while Iraq abandoned large quantities of materiel in the field. Iraq responded to these losses by firing missiles into the cities of Dezful, Masjid Soleiman, and Behbehan. Iran's use of artillery against Basra while the battles in the north raged created multiple fronts, which effectively confused and wore down Iraq.

==== Iran's change in tactics ====
Previously, the Iranians had outnumbered the Iraqis on the battlefield, but Iraq expanded their military draft, pursuing a policy of total war. By 1984, the armies were equal in size. By 1986, Iraq had twice as many soldiers. By 1988, Iraq had 1 million soldiers, giving it the fourth largest army in the world. Some of its equipment, such as tanks, outnumbered Iran's by at least five to one.

After the Dawn Operations, Iran attempted to change tactics. In the face of increasing Iraqi defence in depth, as well as increased armaments and manpower, Iran could no longer rely on human wave attacks. Iranian offensives became more complex and involved extensive manoeuvre warfare using primarily light infantry. Iran launched frequent, and sometimes smaller offensives to slowly gain ground and deplete the Iraqis through attrition. They wanted to drive Iraq into economic failure by wasting money on weapons and war mobilisation, and to deplete their smaller population by bleeding them dry, in addition to creating an anti-government insurgency. They were successful in Kurdistan, but not southern Iraq.

Iran supported their attacks with heavy weaponry when possible and with better planning, although the brunt of the battles still fell to the infantry. The Army and Revolutionary Guards worked together better as their tactics improved. Human wave attacks became less frequent, although were still used. To negate the Iraqi advantage of defence in depth, static positions, and heavy firepower, Iran began to concentrate on areas where the Iraqis could not use their heavy weaponry, such as marshes, valleys, and mountains, and frequently using infiltration tactics.

Iran began training troops in infiltration, patrolling, night-fighting, marsh warfare, and mountain warfare. They began training thousands of Revolutionary Guard commandos in amphibious warfare, as southern Iraq is marshy and filled with wetlands. Iran used speedboats to cross the marshes and rivers in southern Iraq and landed troops on the opposing banks, where they would dig and set up pontoon bridges across the rivers and wetlands to allow heavy troops and supplies to cross. Iran also learned to integrate foreign guerrilla units as part of their military operations. On the northern front, Iran began working heavily with the Peshmerga. Iranian military advisors organised the Kurds into raiding parties of 12 guerrillas, which would attack Iraqi civilian and military infrastructure. The oil refineries of Kirkuk became a frequent target.

==== Battle of the Marshes ====
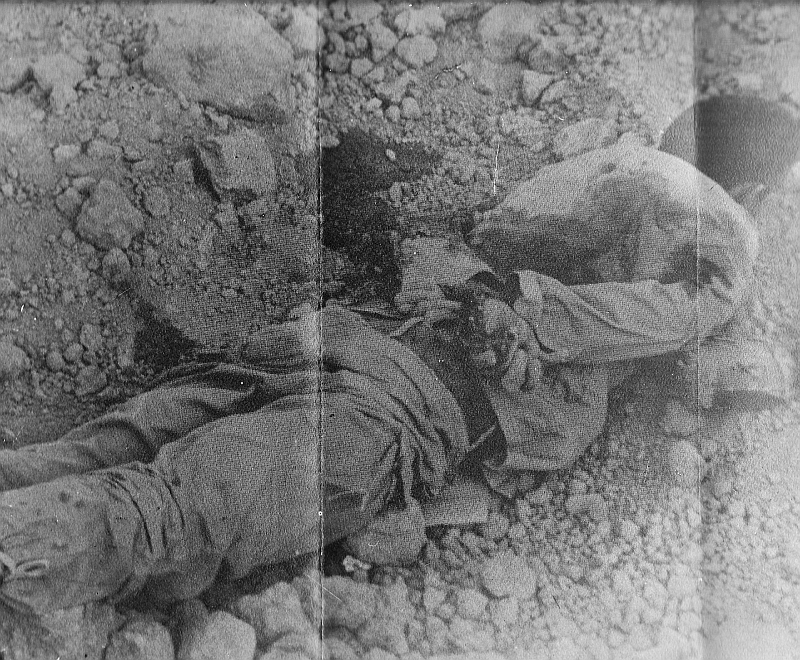
An Iraqi POW who was shot by Iranian troops after they conquered the Iraqi Majnoon oil field in October 1984

By 1984, the Iranian ground forces were reorganised well enough for the Revolutionary Guard to start Operation Kheibar, which lasted from 24 February to 19 March. On 15 February 1984, the Iranians began launching attacks against where the Second Iraqi Army Corps was deployed: 250,000 Iraqis faced 250,000 Iranians. The goal of this new major offensive was the capture of Basra-Baghdad Highway, cutting off Basra from Baghdad and setting the stage for an eventual attack upon the city. The Iraqi high command had assumed that the marshlands above Basra were natural barriers to attack, and had not reinforced them. The marshes negated Iraq's advantage in armour, and absorbed artillery rounds and bombs. Prior to the attack, Iranian commandos on helicopters had landed behind Iraqi lines and destroyed Iraqi artillery. Iran launched two preliminary attacks prior to the main offensive, Operation Dawn 5 and Dawn 6.

Operation Kheibar began on 24 February with Iranian infantrymen crossing the Hawizeh Marshes using motorboats and transport helicopters in an amphibious assault. The Iranians attacked the vital oil-producing Majnoon Island by landing troops via helicopters onto the islands and severing communication between Amareh and Basra. They then continued the attack towards Qurna. By 27 February, they had captured the island, but suffered catastrophic helicopter losses. On that day, a massive array of Iranian helicopters transporting Pasdaran troops were intercepted by Iraqi combat aircraft. Iraq shot down 49 of the 50 Iranian helicopters. At times, fighting took place in waters over 2 m (6.6 ft) deep. Iraq ran live electrical cables through the water, electrocuting numerous Iranian troops and then displaying their corpses on state television.

By 29 February, the Iranians had reached the outskirts of Qurna and were closing in on the Baghdad–Basra highway. They had broken out of the marshes and returned to open terrain, where they were confronted by Iraqi attacks, including mustard gas. 1,200 Iranian soldiers were killed in the counter-attack. The Iranians retreated back to the marshes, though they still held onto them along with Majnoon Island.

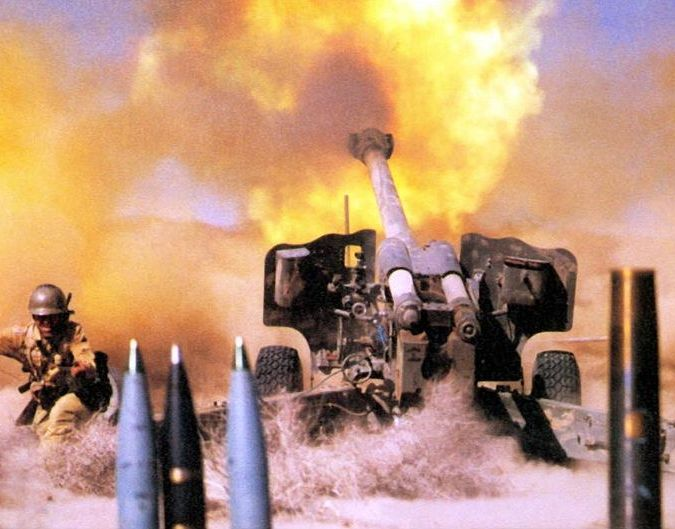
Iranians firing a 152mm D-20 howitzer

The Battle of the Marshes saw an Iraqi defence that had been under continuous strain since 15 February. They were relieved by their use of chemical weapons and defence-in-depth, where they layered defensive lines: even if the Iranians broke through the first line, they were usually unable to break through the second due to exhaustion and heavy losses. They largely relied on Mi-24 Hind to "hunt" the Iranians in the marshes. At least 20,000 Iranians were killed in the marsh battles. Iran used the marshes as a springboard for future attacks/infiltrations.

Four years into the war, the human cost to Iran had been 170,000 combat fatalities and 340,000 wounded. Iraqi combat fatalities were estimated at 80,000 with 150,000 wounded.

=== Tanker war and the war of the cities ===
Unable to launch successful ground attacks against Iran, Iraq used their now expanded air force to carry out strategic bombing against Iranian shipping, economic targets, and cities in order to damage Iran's economy and morale. Iraq also wanted to provoke Iran into doing something that would cause the superpowers to be directly involved in the conflict on the Iraqi side.

==== Attacks on shipping ====
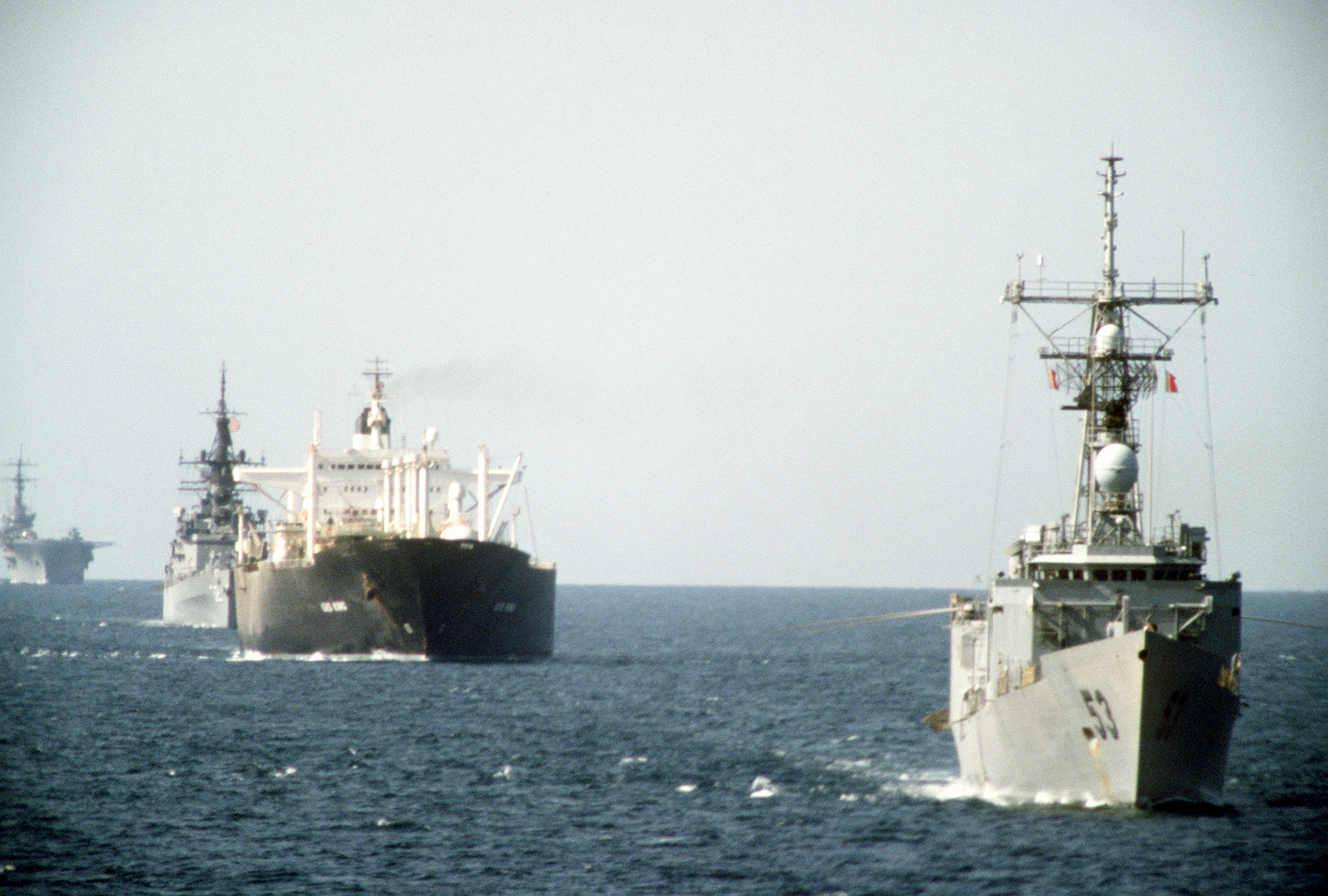
Operation Earnest Will: Tanker convoy No. 12 under US Navy escort (21 October 1987)

The so-called tanker war started when Iraq attacked the oil infrastructure at Kharg Island in early 1984. Iraq's aim in attacking Iranian shipping was to provoke the Iranians to retaliate with extreme measures, such as closing the Strait of Hormuz to all maritime traffic, thereby bringing American intervention; the United States had threatened several times to intervene if the Strait of Hormuz were closed. As a result, the Iranians limited their retaliatory attacks to Iraqi shipping, leaving the strait open to general passage.

Iraq declared that all ships going to or from Iranian ports in the northern zone of the Persian Gulf were subject to attack. They used helicopters armed with Exocet anti-ship missiles, as well as Soviet-made air-to-surface missiles, to enforce their threats. Iraq repeatedly bombed Iran's main oil export facility on Kharg Island, causing increasingly heavy damage. As a first response to these attacks, Iran attacked a Kuwaiti tanker carrying Iraqi oil near Bahrain on 13 May 1984, as well as a Saudi tanker in Saudi waters on 16 May.

Because Iraq had become landlocked during the course of the war, they had to rely on their Arab allies, primarily Kuwait, to transport their oil. Iran attacked tankers carrying Iraqi oil from Kuwait, later attacking tankers from any Persian Gulf state supporting Iraq. Attacks on ships of noncombatant nations in the Persian Gulf sharply increased thereafter, with both nations attacking oil tankers and merchant ships of neutral nations in an effort to deprive their opponent of trade. The Iranian attacks against Saudi shipping led to Saudi aircraft shooting down a pair of Iranian fighters on 5 June 1984.

The air and small-boat attacks did little damage to Persian Gulf state economies, and Iran moved its shipping port to Larak Island in the Strait of Hormuz.

The Iranian Navy imposed a naval blockade of Iraq, using its British-built frigates to stop and inspect any ships thought to be trading with Iraq. They operated with virtual impunity, as Iraqi pilots had little training in hitting naval targets. Some Iranian warships attacked tankers with ship-to-ship missiles, while others used their radars to guide land-based anti-ship missiles to their targets. Iran began to rely on its new Revolutionary Guard's navy, which used Boghammar speedboats fitted with rocket launchers and heavy machine guns. These speedboats would launch surprise attacks against tankers and cause substantial damage. Iran also used F-4 Phantom II fighters and helicopters to launch Maverick missiles and unguided rockets at tankers.

A U.S. Navy ship, Stark, was struck on 17 May 1987 by two missiles from an Iraqi plane. They had been fired at about the time the plane was given a routine radio warning by Stark. The frigate did not detect the missiles with radar, and warning was given by the lookout only moments before they struck. Both missiles hit the ship, killing 37 sailors.

Lloyd's of London estimated that the tanker war damaged 546 commercial vessels and killed about 430 civilian sailors. The largest portion of the attacks was directed by Iraq against vessels in Iranian waters, with the Iraqis launching three times as many attacks as the Iranians. But Iranian speedboat attacks on Kuwaiti shipping led Kuwait to formally petition foreign powers on 1 November 1986 to protect its shipping. The Soviet Union agreed to charter tankers starting in 1987, and the U.S. Navy offered to provide protection for foreign tankers reflagged and flying the U.S. flag starting 7 March 1987 in Operation Earnest Will. Neutral tankers shipping to Iran were not protected by Earnest Will, resulting in reduced foreign tanker traffic to Iran, since they risked Iraqi air attack. Iran accused the United States of helping Iraq.

During the course of the war, Iran attacked two Soviet merchant ships.

Seawise Giant, the largest ship ever built at the time, was struck by Iraqi Exocet missiles as it was carrying Iranian crude oil out of the Persian Gulf.

==== Attacks on cities ====
Meanwhile, Iraq's air force also began carrying out strategic bombing raids against Iranian cities. While Iraq had launched numerous attacks with aircraft and missiles against border cities from the beginning of the war and sporadic raids on Iran's main cities, this was the first systematic strategic bombing that Iraq carried out during the war. This would become known as the war of the cities. With the help of the USSR and the west, Iraq's air force had been rebuilt and expanded. Meanwhile, Iran, due to sanctions and lack of spare parts, had heavily curtailed its air force operations. Iraq used strategic bombers to carry out long-range high-speed raids on Iranian cities, including Tehran. Fighter-bombers were used against smaller or shorter range targets, as well as escorting the strategic bombers. Civilian and industrial targets were hit by the raids, and each successful raid inflicted economic damage from regular strategic bombing.

In response, the Iranians deployed their F-4 Phantoms to combat the Iraqis, and eventually they deployed F-14s as well. By 1986, Iran also expanded their air defence network heavily to relieve the pressure on the air force. By later in the war, Iraqi air attacks were used only on fewer, more important targets. Starting in 1987, Saddam also ordered several chemical attacks on civilian targets in Iran, like in Sardasht.

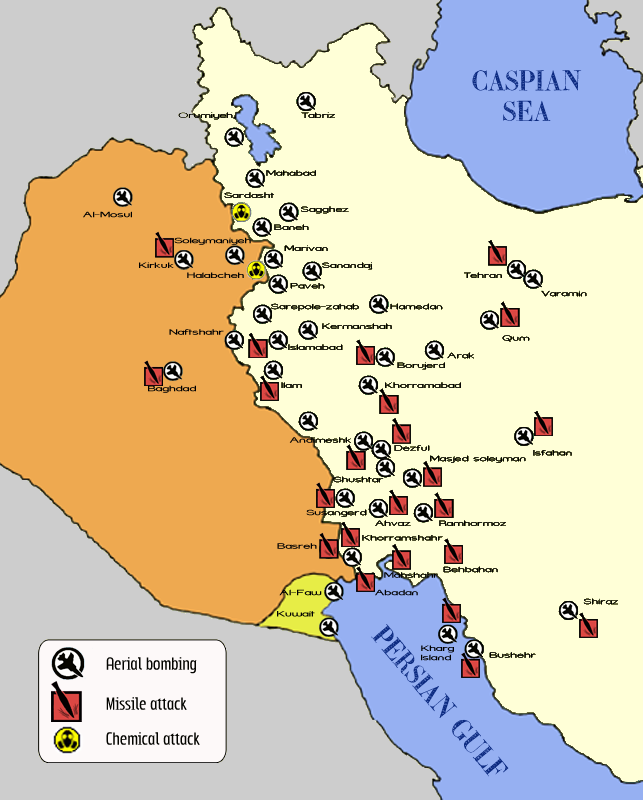
A map indicating the attacks on civilian areas of Iran, Iraq, and Kuwait that were targeted during the war of the cities

Iran also launched several retaliatory air raids on Iraq, while primarily shelling border cities such as Basra. Iran also bought some Scud missiles from Libya, and launched them against Baghdad. These too inflicted damage upon Iraq.

On 7 February 1984, Saddam ordered his air force to attack eleven Iranian cities; bombardments ceased on 22 February. It was estimated that 1,200 Iranian civilians were killed during the raids in February alone.

==== Strategic situation in 1984 ====
By 1984, Iran's losses were estimated to be 300,000 soldiers, while Iraq's losses were estimated to be 150,000. Foreign analysts agreed that both Iran and Iraq failed to use their modern equipment properly, and both sides failed to carry out modern military assaults that could win the war. Both sides also abandoned equipment in the battlefield because their technicians were unable to carry out repairs. Iran and Iraq showed little internal coordination on the battlefield, and in many cases units were left to fight on their own. As a result, by the end of 1984, the war was a stalemate. One limited offensive Iran launched (Dawn 7) took place in October, when they recaptured the city of Mehran.

=== 1985–86 Iraqi offensives ===
By 1985, Iraqi armed forces were receiving financial support from Saudi Arabia, Kuwait, and other Persian Gulf states, and were making substantial arms purchases from the Soviet Union, China, and France. For the first time since early 1980, Saddam launched new offensives.

On 6 January 1986, the Iraqis launched an offensive attempting to retake Majnoon Island. They were quickly bogged down into a stalemate against 200,000 Iranian infantrymen, reinforced by amphibious divisions. However, they managed to gain a foothold in the southern part of the island.

Between 12 and 14 March, Iraq hit up to 158 targets in over 30 towns and cities, including Tehran. Iran responded with missile launches. More Iraqi air attacks were carried out in August, resulting in hundreds of additional civilian casualties. Iraqi attacks against both Iranian and neutral oil tankers in Iranian waters continued, with Iraq carrying out 150 airstrikes using French-bought jet and helicopters.

==== Operation Badr ====
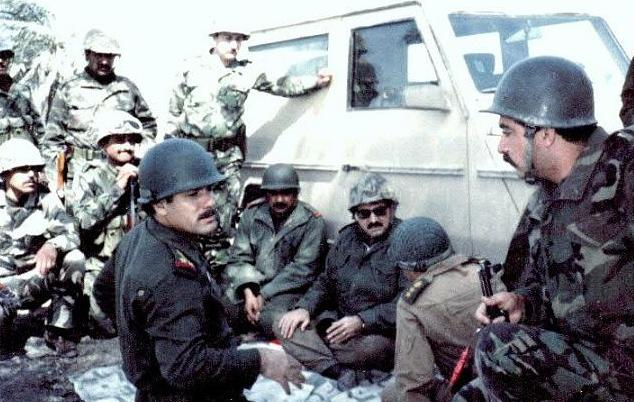
Iraqi commanders discussing strategies on the battlefront, 1986

The Iraqis attacked again on 28 January 1985; they were defeated, and the Iranians retaliated on 11 March with a major offensive directed against the Baghdad-Basra highway, codenamed Operation Badr. This operation was similar to Operation Kheibar, though it invoked more planning. Iran used 100,000 men, with 60,000 more in reserve. They assessed the marshy terrain, plotted points where they could land tanks, and constructed pontoon bridges across the marshes. The Basij forces were also equipped with anti-tank weapons.

The ferocity of the Iranian offensive broke through the Iraqi lines. Iran broke through north of Qurna on 14 March. That same night, they reached and crossed the Tigris River using pontoon bridges, and captured part of the Baghdad–Basra Highway 6.

Saddam responded by launching chemical attacks against the Iranian positions along the highway and by initiating the aforementioned second war of the cities, with an air and missile campaign against twenty to thirty Iranian population centres, including Tehran. The Iraqis launched air attacks against the Iranian positions and pinned them down. They then launched a pincer attack using mechanised infantry and heavy artillery. Chemical weapons were used, and the Iraqis also flooded Iranian trenches with specially constructed pipes delivering water from the Tigris.

The Iranians retreated back to the Hoveyzeh marshes while being attacked by helicopters, and the highway was recaptured by the Iraqis. Operation Badr resulted in 10,000–12,000 Iraqi casualties and 15,000 Iranian ones.

=== Iranian counteroffensives ===
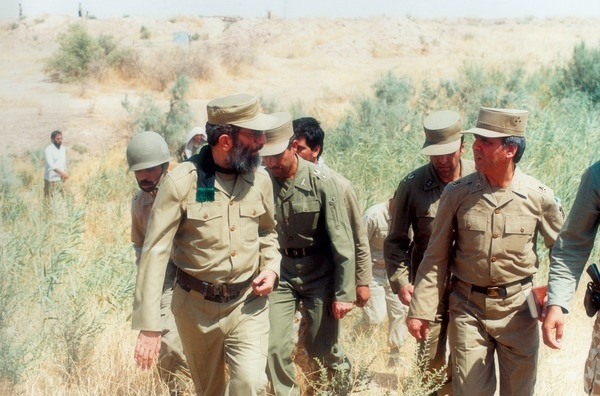
Iranian President Ali Khamenei on the battlefront during the war

The failure of the human wave attacks in earlier years had prompted Iran to develop a better working relationship between the Army and the Revolutionary Guard and to mould the Revolutionary Guard units into a more conventional fighting force. To combat Iraq's use of chemical weapons, Iran began producing an antidote. They also created and fielded their own homemade drones fitted with RPG-7s. They were primarily used in observation, being used for up to 700 sorties.

Until the spring of 1988, the Iranian Air Force's efficiency in air defence increased, with weapons being repaired or replaced and new tactical methods being used. For example, the Iranians would loosely integrate their SAM sites and interceptors to create "killing fields" in which dozens of Iraqi planes were lost, which was reported in the West as the Iranian Air Force using F-14s as "mini-AWACs". The Iraqi Air Force reacted by increasing the sophistication of its equipment, incorporating modern electronic countermeasure pods, decoys such as chaff and flare, and anti-radiation missiles.

Due to heavy losses in the last war of the cities, Iraq reduced its use of aerial attacks on Iranian cities. Instead, they launched Scud missiles, which the Iranians could not stop. Since the range of the Scud missile was too short to reach Tehran, they converted them to al-Husayn missiles with the help of East German engineers. Iran responded to these attacks by using their own Scud missiles.

Compounding the extensive foreign help to Iraq, Iranian attacks were severely hampered by their shortages of weaponry, particularly heavy weapons as large amounts had been lost during the war. Iran still managed to maintain 1,000 tanks, often by capturing Iraqi ones and additional artillery, but many needed repairs to be operational. By this time Iran managed to procure spare parts from various sources, helping them to restore some weapons. They secretly imported some weapons, such as anti-aircraft missiles. In an exception to the U.S.' support for Iraq, in exchange for Iran using its influence to help free western hostages in Lebanon, the U.S. secretly sold Iran some limited supplies. Akbar Rafsanjani writes that during the period when Iran was succeeding, for a short time the U.S. supported Iran, then shortly after began helping Iraq again. Iran managed to get some advanced weapons, such as anti-tank TOW missiles. Iran later reverse-engineered and produced those weapons themselves. All of these almost certainly helped increase their effectiveness, but did not reduce their human losses.

==== First Battle of al-Faw ====
Operation Dawn 8 during which Iran captured the al-Faw peninsula

On 10–11 February 1986, Iran launched Operation Dawn 8, in which 30,000 men from the Revolutionary Guard and Basij advanced in an offensive to capture the al-Faw peninsula in southern Iraq, the only area touching the Persian Gulf. The capture of al-Faw and Umm Qasr was a major goal for Iran. Iran began with an unsuccessful feint attack against Basra.

Meanwhile, an amphibious strike force landed at the foot of the peninsula. The resistance, consisting of several thousand poorly trained soldiers of the Iraqi Popular Army, fled or were defeated, and the Iranian forces set up pontoon bridges crossing the Shatt al-Arab, allowing 30,000 soldiers to cross over a short period. They drove north along the peninsula almost unopposed, capturing it after only 24 hours of fighting. Afterwards they dug in and set up defences.

The sudden loss of al-Faw shocked the Iraqis, since they had thought it impossible for the Iranians to cross the Shatt al-Arab. On 12 February 1986, the Iraqis began a counter-offensive to retake al-Faw, which failed after a week of heavy fighting. On 24 February 1986, Iraq begin another attempt, which again ended in failure, costing them many soldiers, tanks and aircraft. The loss of al-Faw and the subsequent counter-offensives led the Gulf countries to fear that Iran might win the war. Kuwait in particular felt menaced with Iranian troops only miles away, and increased its support of Iraq.

In March 1986, the Iranians tried to follow up their success by attempting to take Umm Qasr, which would have completely severed Iraq from the Gulf and placed Iranian troops on the border with Kuwait. The offensive failed due to Iranian armour shortages. By this time, 17,000 Iraqis and 30,000 Iranians were casualties. The First Battle of al-Faw ended in March, but indecisive heavy combat operations lasted on the peninsula into 1988. The battle bogged down into a stalemate in the peninsula's marshes.

==== Battle of Mehran ====
Immediately after the Iranian capture of al-Faw, Saddam declared a new offensive against Iran, designed to drive deep into the state. Mehran, by the Zagros Mountains, was the first target. On 15–19 May, Iraqi Army's Second Corps, supported by helicopter gunships, attacked and captured the city. Saddam then offered to exchange Mehran for al-Faw. The Iranians rejected the offer. Iraq then continued the attack, attempting to push deeper into Iran. Iraq's attack was quickly warded off by Iranian AH-1 Cobra helicopters with TOW missiles, which destroyed numerous Iraqi tanks and vehicles.

The Iranians built up their forces on the heights surrounding Mehran. On 30 June, they launched their attack, recapturing the city by 3 July. Saddam ordered the Republican Guard to retake the city on 4 July, but their attack was ineffective. Iraqi losses were heavy enough to allow the Iranians to also capture territory inside Iraq, and depleted the Iraqi military enough to prevent them from launching a major offensive for the next two years. Iraq's defeats at al-Faw and at Mehran were severe blows to its prestige, but Western powers, including the U.S., became more determined to prevent an Iraqi loss.

==== Situation at the end of 1986 ====
Through the eyes of international observers, Iran was prevailing in the war by the end of 1986. In the northern front, the Iranians began launching attacks toward the city of Suleimaniya with the help of Kurdish fighters, taking the Iraqis by surprise. They came within miles the city before being repelled. Iran's army had also reached the Meimak Hills, only 113 km (70 mi) from Baghdad. Iraq managed to contain Iran's offensives in the south, but was under serious pressure, as the Iranians were slowly overwhelming them.

Iraq retaliated. In one attack, Tehran's main oil refinery was hit, and in another instance, Iraq damaged Iran's Assadabad satellite dish, disrupting Iranian overseas telephone and telex service for almost two weeks. Civilian areas were also hit, resulting in many casualties. Iraq continued to attack oil tankers via air. Iran responded by launching Scud missiles and air attacks at Iraqi targets.

Iraq continued to attack Kharg Island and the oil tankers and facilities as well. Iran created a tanker shuttle service of 20 tankers to move oil from Kharg to Larak Island, escorted by Iranian fighter jets. Once moved to Larak, the oil would be moved to oceangoing tankers, most of which were neutral. They also rebuilt the oil terminals damaged by Iraqi air raids and moved shipping to Larak Island, while attacking foreign tankers that carried Iraqi oil, as Iran had blocked Iraq's access to the open sea with the capture of al-Faw. By now, they almost always used the armed speedboats of the IRGC navy, and attacked many tankers.

The tanker war escalated drastically, with attacks nearly doubling in 1986, the majority carried out by Iraq. Iraq obtained permission to cross Saudi territory to attack Larak Island, although the distance made attacks less frequent there. The escalating tanker war in the Gulf became an ever-increasing concern to foreign powers, especially the United States.

In April 1986, Khomeini issued a fatwa declaring that the war must be won by March 1987. The Iranians increased recruitment efforts, obtaining 650,000 volunteers. The animosity between the Army and the Revolutionary Guard arose again, with the Army wanting to use more refined, limited military attacks, while the Revolutionary Guard wanted to carry out major offensives. Iran, confident in its successes, began planning their largest offensives of the war, which they called their "final offensives".

==== Iraq's dynamic defence strategy ====
Faced with recent defeats in al-Faw and Mehran, Iraq appeared to be losing the war. Iraq's generals, angered by Saddam's interference, threatened full-scale mutiny against the Ba'ath Party unless they were allowed to conduct operations freely. In one of the few times during his career, Saddam gave in to the demands of his generals. Up to this point, Iraqi strategy was to ride out Iranian attacks. However, the defeat at al-Faw led Saddam to require all civilians join the war effort.

The government tried to integrate the Shias into the war effort by recruiting many as part of the Ba'ath Party. In an attempt to counterbalance the religious fervour of the Iranians and gain support from the devout masses, the regime also began to promote religion and, on the surface, Islamisation, despite the fact that Iraq was run by a secular regime. Scenes of Saddam praying and making pilgrimages to shrines became common on state-run television. While Iraqi morale had been low throughout the war, the attack on al-Faw raised patriotic fervour, as the Iraqis feared invasion.

Saddam also recruited volunteers from other Arab countries into the Republican Guard, and received much technical support from foreign nations. While Iraqi military power had been depleted in recent battles, through heavy foreign purchases and support, they were able to expand their military to much larger proportions by 1988.

At the same time, Saddam ordered the Anfal campaign in an attempt to crush the Kurdish resistance, who were now allied with Iran. Several hundred thousand Iraqi Kurds were killed, and numerous towns and cities were destroyed.

Iraq began to try to perfect its manoeuvre tactics. The Iraqis began to prioritise the professionalisation of their military. Prior to 1986, the conscription-based Iraqi regular army and the volunteer-based Iraqi Popular Army conducted the bulk of the operations in the war, to little effect. The Republican Guard, formerly an elite praetorian guard, was expanded as a volunteer army and filled with Iraq's best generals. Loyalty to the state was no longer a primary requisite for joining. Full-scale war games against hypothetical Iranian positions were carried out in the western Iraqi desert against mock targets. They were repeated over the course of a full year until the forces involved fully memorised their attacks. Iraq built its military massively, eventually possessing the 4th largest in the world, in order to overwhelm the Iranians through sheer size.

=== 1987–88: Renewed Iranian Offensives ===
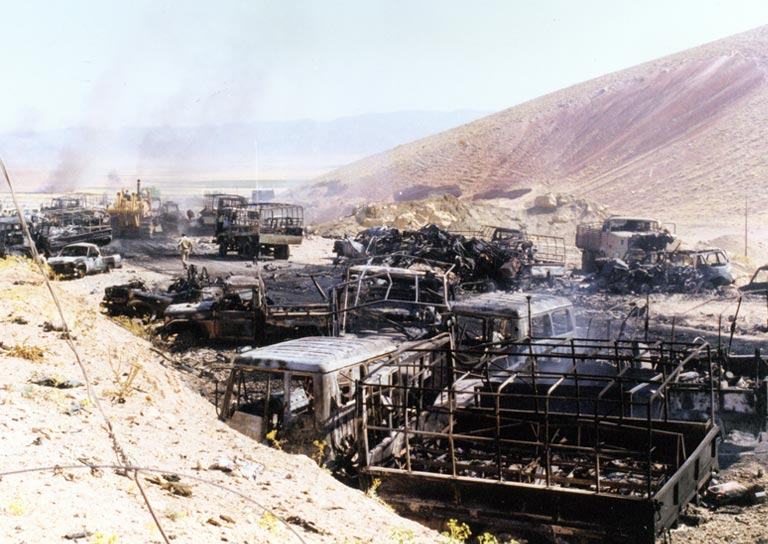
Burned-out vehicles shown in the aftermath of Operation Mersad

Meanwhile, Iran continued to attack as the Iraqis were planning their strike. In 1987, the Iranians renewed a series of major human wave offensives in both northern and southern Iraq. The Iraqis had elaborately fortified Basra with five defensive rings, exploiting natural waterways such as the Shatt al-Arab and artificial ones, such as Fish Lake and the Jasim River, along with earth barriers. Fish Lake was a massive lake filled with mines, underwater barbed wire, electrodes and sensors. Behind each waterway and defensive line was radar-guided artillery, ground attack aircraft and helicopters, all capable of firing poison gas or conventional munitions.

The Iranian strategy was to penetrate the Iraqi defences and encircle Basra, isolating the city and the al-Faw peninsula. Iran's plan was for three assaults: a diversionary attack near Basra, the main offensive and another diversionary attack using Iranian tanks in the north to divert Iraqi heavy armour from Basra. For these battles, the Iranian military had grown by recruiting many new Basij and Pasdaran volunteers. Total Iranian strength reached 150,000–200,000.

==== Operation Karbala-4 ====
On 25 December 1986, Iran launched Operation Karbala-4. According to Iraqi General Ra'ad al-Hamdani, this was a diversionary attack. The Iranians launched an amphibious assault against the Iraqi island of Umm al-Rassas in the Shatt al-Arab, parallel to Khoramshahr. They then set up a pontoon bridge and continued the attack, eventually capturing the island, but failing to advance further. The Iranians had 60,000 casualties, while the Iraqis 9,500. The Iraqi commanders exaggerated Iranian losses to Saddam, and it was assumed that the main Iranian attack on Basra had been fully defeated and that it would take the Iranians six months to recover. When the main Iranian attack, Operation Karbala-5, began, many Iraqis were on leave.

==== Karbala-5 (Sixth Battle of Basra) ====
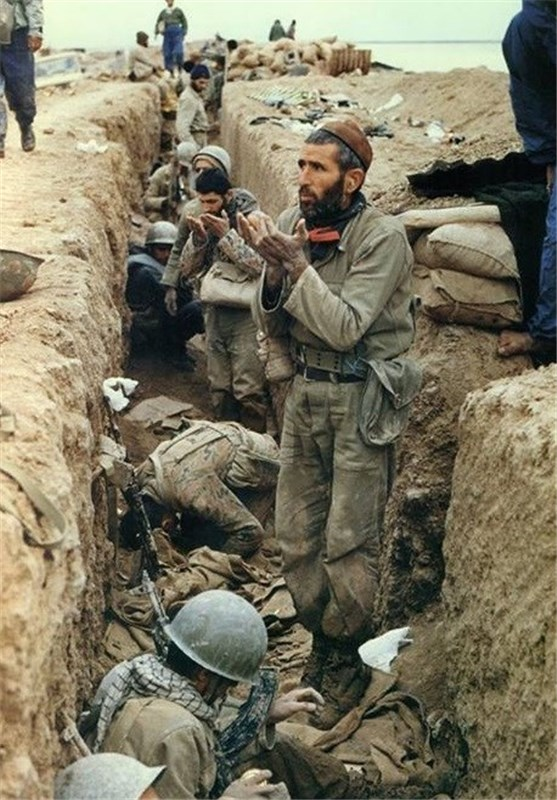
Iranian soldiers praying inside a trench during Operation Karbala-5

In the Siege of Basra, or Operation Karbala-5, Iran attempted to capture Basra in early 1987. Known for its extensive casualties and ferocious conditions, this was the biggest battle of the war. While Iranian forces crossed the border and captured the eastern section of Basra Governorate, the operation ended in a stalemate.

==== Karbala-6 ====
At the same time as Operation Karbala 5, Iran launched Operation Karbala-6 against the Iraqis in Qasr-e Shirin in central Iran to prevent the Iraqis from rapidly transferring units down to defend against the Karbala-5 attack. The attack was carried out by Basij infantry and the Revolutionary Guard's 31st Ashura and the Army's 77th Khorasan armoured divisions. The Basij attacked the Iraqi lines, forcing the Iraqi infantry to retreat. An Iraqi armoured counter-attack surrounded the Basij in a pincer movement. The Iranian tank divisions attacked, breaking the encirclement. The Iranian attack was stopped by mass Iraqi chemical weapons attacks.

=== Iranian war-weariness ===
Operation Karbala-5 was a severe blow to Iran's military and morale. To foreign observers, it appeared that Iran was continuing to strengthen. By 1988, Iran had become self-sufficient in many areas, such as anti-tank missiles, ballistic missiles, anti-ship missiles, tactical rockets, and producing spare weapon parts. Iran had improved its air defences with smuggled surface to air missiles. Iran was even producing UAVs and the Pilatus PC-7 propeller aircraft for observation. Iran doubled their stocks of artillery, and was self-sufficient in the manufacture of ammunition and small arms.

While it was not obvious to foreign observers, the Iranian public had become increasingly war-weary and disillusioned with the fighting, and relatively few volunteers joined the fight in 1987–88. Because the Iranian war effort relied on popular mobilisation, their military strength actually declined, and Iran was unable to launch any major offensives after Karbala-5. As a result, for the first time since 1982, the momentum of the fighting shifted towards the regular army, whose reliance on conscription made the war even less popular. Many Iranians began to try to escape the conflict. Anti-war demonstrations took place in numerous cities throughout Iran, which were violently suppressed by the regime, causing deaths.

The leadership acknowledged that the war was a stalemate, and began to plan accordingly. No more "final offensives" were planned. Akbar Rafsanjani also announced the end of human wave attacks. Mohsen Rezaee, head of the IRGC, announced that Iran would focus exclusively on limited attacks and infiltrations, while arming and supporting opposition groups inside of Iraq.

On the Iranian home front, sanctions, declining oil prices, and Iraqi attacks on Iranian oil facilities and shipping took a heavy toll on the economy. While the attacks themselves were not as destructive as some analysts believed, the U.S.-led Operation Earnest Will, which protected Iraqi and allied oil tankers, but not Iranian ones, led many neutral countries to stop trading with Iran because of rising insurance and fear of air attack. Iranian oil and non-oil exports fell by 55%, inflation reached 50% by 1987, and unemployment skyrocketed. At the same time, Iraq was experiencing crushing debt and shortages of workers, encouraging its leadership to try to end the war quickly.

==== Strategic situation in late 1987 ====
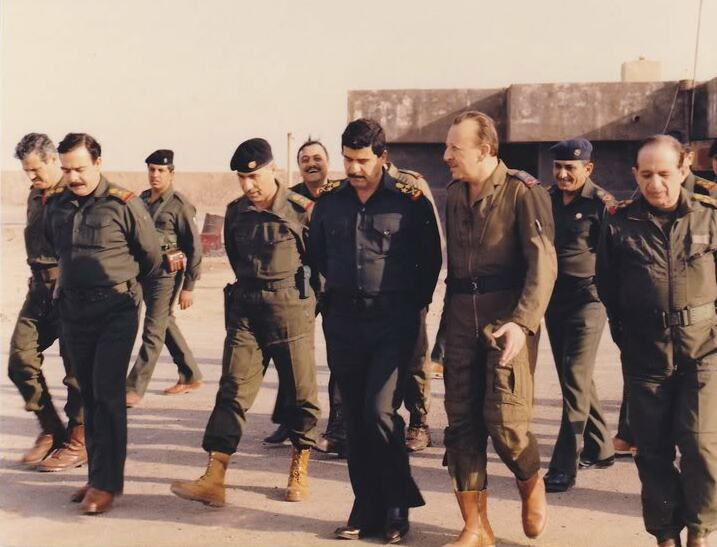
Adnan Khairallah, Iraqi Defence Minister, meeting with Iraqi soldiers during the war

By the end of 1987, Iraq possessed 5,550 tanks, outnumbering the Iranians six to one, and 900 fighter aircraft, outnumbering the Iranians ten to one. After Operation Karbala-5, Iraq only had 100 qualified fighter pilots remaining. Therefore, Iraq began to invest in recruiting foreign pilots from countries such as Belgium, South Africa, Pakistan, East Germany, and the Soviet Union. They replenished their manpower by integrating volunteers from other Arab countries into their army. Iraq also became self-sufficient in chemical weapons and some conventional ones and received much equipment from abroad. Foreign support helped Iraq bypass its economic troubles and massive debt to continue the war and increase the size of its military.

While the southern and central fronts were at a stalemate, Iran began to focus on carrying out offensives in northern Iraq with the help of the Peshmerga (Kurdish insurgents). The Iranians used a combination of semi-guerrilla and infiltration tactics in the Kurdish mountains with the Peshmerga. During Operation Karbala-9 in early April, Iran captured territory near Suleimaniya, provoking a severe poison gas counter-attack. During Operation Karbala-10, Iran attacked near the same area, capturing more territory. During Operation Nasr-4, the Iranians surrounded the city of Suleimaniya and, with the help of the Peshmerga, infiltrated over 140 km into Iraq and raided and threatened to capture Kirkuk and other northern oilfields.

=== Air and tanker war ===
With the stalemate on land, the air/tanker war became more important. The Iranian Air Force had become very small, with a limited number of planes, although they managed to restore some damaged planes to service. The Air Force, despite its once sophisticated equipment, lacked enough equipment and personnel to sustain the war of attrition that had developed, and was unable to lead an outright onslaught against Iraq.

The Iraqi Air Force, had originally lacked modern equipment and experienced pilots, but after pleas from Iraqi military leaders, Saddam decreased political influence on everyday operations and left the fighting to his combatants. The Soviets began delivering more advanced aircraft and weapons to Iraq, while the French improved training for flight crews and technical personnel and continually introduced new methods for countering Iranian weapons and tactics. Iranian ground air defences still shot down many Iraqi aircraft.

The main Iraqi air effort had shifted to the destruction of Iranian war-fighting capability, primarily Persian Gulf oil fields, tankers and Kharg Island. Starting in late 1986, the Iraqi Air Force began a comprehensive campaign against Iranian economic infrastructure. By late 1987, the Iraqi Air Force could count on direct American support for long-range operations against Iranian infrastructural targets and oil installations deep in the Persian Gulf. U.S. Navy ships tracked and reported movements of Iranian shipping and defences. In the massive Iraqi air strike against Kharg Island, flown on 18 March 1988, the Iraqis destroyed two supertankers but lost five aircraft.

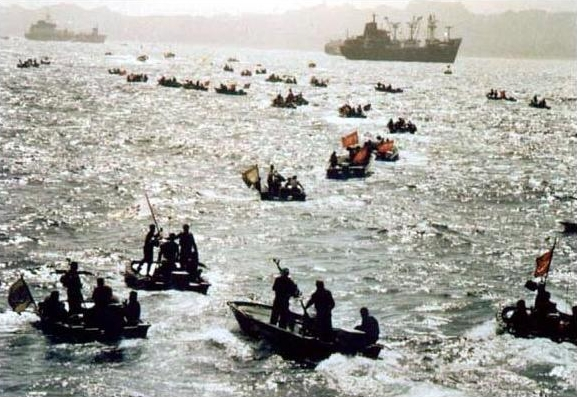
IRGC navy speedboats using swarm tactics

The attacks on oil tankers continued. Both Iran and Iraq carried out frequent attacks during the first four months of the year. Iran was effectively waging a naval guerilla war with its IRGC navy speedboats, while Iraq attacked with its aircraft. In 1987, Kuwait asked to reflag its tankers to the U.S. flag. They did so in March, and the U.S. Navy began Operation Earnest Will to escort the tankers. The result of Earnest Will would be that, while oil tankers shipping Iraqi/Kuwaiti oil were protected, Iranian tankers and neutral tankers shipping to Iran would be unprotected, inflicting losses on Iran and undermining its trade with foreign countries, damaging Iran's economy further.

Iran deployed Silkworm missiles to attack ships, but only a few were actually fired. Both the U.S. and Iran jockeyed for influence in the Gulf. To discourage the U.S. from escorting tankers, Iran secretly mined some areas. The U.S. began to escort the reflagged tankers, but one was damaged by a mine while under escort. While being a public-relations victory for Iran, the U.S. increased its reflagging efforts. While Iran mined the Persian Gulf, their speedboat attacks were reduced, primarily attacking unflagged tankers shipping in the area.

On 24 September, U.S. Navy SEALs captured the Iranian mine-laying ship Iran Ajr, a diplomatic disaster for the already isolated Iranians. Iran had previously sought to maintain at least a pretence of plausible deniability regarding its use of mines, but SEALs captured and photographed extensive evidence of Iran Ajr's mine-laying activities. On 8 October, the U.S. Navy destroyed four Iranian speedboats, and in response to Iranian Silkworm missile attacks on Kuwaiti oil tankers, launched Operation Nimble Archer, destroying two Iranian oil rigs in the Persian Gulf. During November and December, the Iraqi air force launched a bid to destroy all Iranian airbases in Khuzestan and the remaining Iranian air force. Iran managed to shoot down 30 Iraqi fighters with fighter jets, anti-aircraft guns, and missiles, allowing the Iranian air force to survive to the end of the war.

On 28 June, Iraqi fighter bombers attacked the Iranian town of Sardasht near the border using mustard gas bombs. This was the first time the Iraqis had attacked a civilian town with poison gas. 5,000 people were stricken. 113 died immediately, and many more died over the following decades.

=== 1988: Final Iraqi offensives ===
By 1988, with massive equipment imports and reduced Iranian volunteers, Iraq was ready to launch major offensives. In February 1988, Saddam began the fifth and most deadly war of the cities. Over the next two months, Iraq launched over 200 al-Husayn missiles at 37 Iranian cities. Saddam also threatened to use chemical weapons in his missiles, causing 30% of Tehran's population to leave the city. Iran retaliated, launching at least 104 missiles against Iraq in 1988 and shelling Basra. In all, Iraq launched 520 Scuds and al-Husseins against Iran; Iran fired 177 in return. The Iranian attacks were too few in number to deter Iraq from launching their attacks. Iraq also increased their airstrikes against Kharg Island and Iranian oil tankers. With their tankers protected by U.S. warships, they could operate with virtual impunity. In addition, the West supplied Iraq's air force with laser-guided smart bombs, allowing them to attack economic targets while evading anti-aircraft defences. These attacks began to have a major toll on the Iranian economy and morale and caused many casualties.

==== Iran's Kurdistan Operations ====
In March 1988, the Iranians carried out Operations Dawn 10, Beit ol-Moqaddas 2, and Zafar 7 in Iraqi Kurdistan with the aim of capturing the city of Suleimaniya and the Darbandikhan Dam and the power plant at Lake Dukan, which supplied Iraq with much of its electricity and water. Iran hoped that the capture of these areas would bring more favourable terms to the ceasefire agreement. This infiltration offensive was carried out in conjunction with the Peshmerga. Iranian airborne commandos landed behind the Iraqi lines and Iranian helicopters hit Iraqi tanks with TOW missiles. The Iraqis were taken by surprise, and Iranian F-5E Tiger fighter jets even damaged the Kirkuk oil refinery. Iraq executed multiple officers for these failures in March–April 1988, including Colonel Jafar Sadeq. Infiltrating the Kurdish mountains, Iran captured the town of Halabja and began to fan out across the province.

Though the Iranians advanced to within sight of Dukan and captured around 1,040 km^{2} (400 sq mi) and 4,000 Iraqis, the offensive failed due to the Iraqi chemical warfare. The Iraqis launched the deadliest chemical weapons attacks of the war. The Republican Guard launched 700 chemical shells, while the other artillery divisions launched 200–300 chemical shells each, unleashing a chemical cloud that killed or wounded 60% of the Iranians. The blow was felt particularly by the Iranian 84th infantry division and 55th paratrooper division. The Iraqi special forces then stopped the remains of the Iranian force. In retaliation for Kurdish collaboration with the Iranians, Iraq launched a massive poison gas attack against Kurdish civilians in Halabja, recently taken by the Iranians, killing thousands. Iran airlifted foreign journalists to the ruined city, and the images of the dead were shown throughout the world, but Western opposition to Iran led them to also blame Iran for the attack.

==== Second Battle of al-Faw ====
On 17 April 1988, Iraq launched Operation Ramadan Mubarak, a surprise attack against the 15,000 Basij troops on the al-Faw peninsula. The attack was preceded by Iraqi diversionary attacks in northern Iraq, with a massive artillery and air barrage of Iranian front lines. Key areas, such as supply lines, command posts, and ammunition depots were hit by a storm of mustard gas and nerve gas, as well as by conventional explosives. Helicopters landed Iraqi commandos behind Iranian lines on al-Faw while the main Iraqi force made a frontal assault. Within 48 hours, all Iranian forces had been killed or cleared from the al-Faw peninsula. The day was celebrated in Iraq as Faw Liberation Day throughout Saddam's rule. The Iraqis had planned the offensive well. Prior to the attack, the Iraqi soldiers injected themselves with poison gas antidote, knowing wind may carry the toxic clouds towards their positions. Heavy and well- executed use of chemical weapons was the decisive factor in the victory. Iraqi losses were much lighter than those of Iran. Ra'ad al-Hamdani later recounted that the recapture of al-Faw marked "the highest point of experience and expertise that the Iraqi Army reached." The Iranians eventually managed to halt the Iraqi drive as they pushed towards Khuzestan.

Surprising the Iranians, rather than breaking off the offensive, the Iraqis kept up their drive, and a new force attacked the Iranian positions around Basra. Following this, the Iraqis launched a sustained drive to clear the Iranians out of all of southern Iraq. One of the most successful Iraqi tactics was the chemical weapon "one-two punch". Artillery would saturate the Iranian front line with rapidly dispersing cyanide and nerve gas, while longer-lasting mustard gas was launched via fighter-bombers and rockets against the Iranian rear, creating a "chemical wall" that blocked reinforcement.

==== Operation Praying Mantis ====
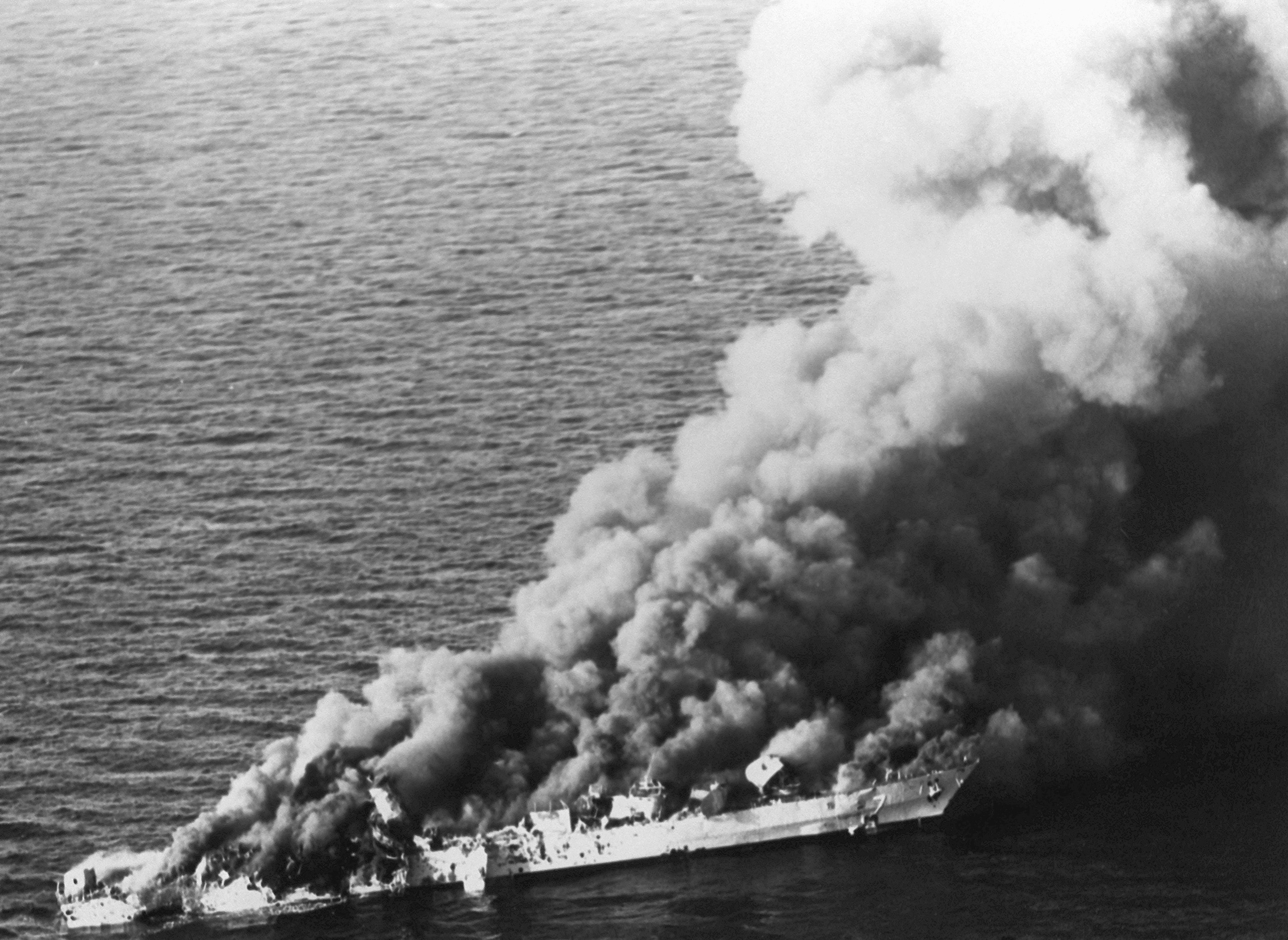
The Iranian frigate IS Sahand burns after being hit by 20 U.S. air launched missiles and bombs, killing a third of the crew, April 1988

The same day as Iraq's attack on al-Faw peninsula, the United States Navy launched Operation Praying Mantis in retaliation against Iran for damaging a warship with a mine. Iran lost oil platforms, destroyers, and frigates in this battle, which ended only when President Reagan decided that the Iranian navy had been damaged enough. In spite of this, the Revolutionary Guard Navy continued their speedboat attacks against oil tankers. The defeats at al-Faw and in the Persian Gulf nudged Iranian leadership towards quitting the war, especially when facing the prospect of fighting the Americans.

==== Iranian counteroffensive ====
Faced with such losses, Khomeini appointed Rafsanjani as the Supreme Commander of the Armed Forces, though he had in actuality occupied that position for months. Rafsanjani ordered a last desperate counter-attack into Iraq, which was launched 13 June 1988. The Iranians infiltrated through the Iraqi trenches and moved 10 km (6.2 mi) into Iraq and managed to strike Saddam's presidential palace in Baghdad using fighter aircraft. After three days of fighting, the decimated Iranians were driven back to their original positions again as the Iraqis launched 650 helicopter and 300 aircraft sorties.

==== Operation Forty Stars ====
On 18 June 1988, the People's Mojahedin Organization of Iran (PMOI) conducted Operation Forty Stars. In four days, they wiped out a Pasdaran division, seizing Mehran and building a bridgehead twelve miles into Iran. According to the PMOI, Iraqi soldiers did not participate in the operation. Baghdad also said it was not involved in the battle.

==== Tawakalna ala Allah operations ====
On 25 May 1988, Iraq launched the first of five Tawakalna ala Allah Operations, consisting of one of the largest artillery barrages in history, coupled with chemical weapons. The marshes had been dried by drought, allowing the Iraqis to use tanks to bypass Iranian field fortifications, expelling the Iranians from the border town of Shalamcheh after less than 10 hours of combat.

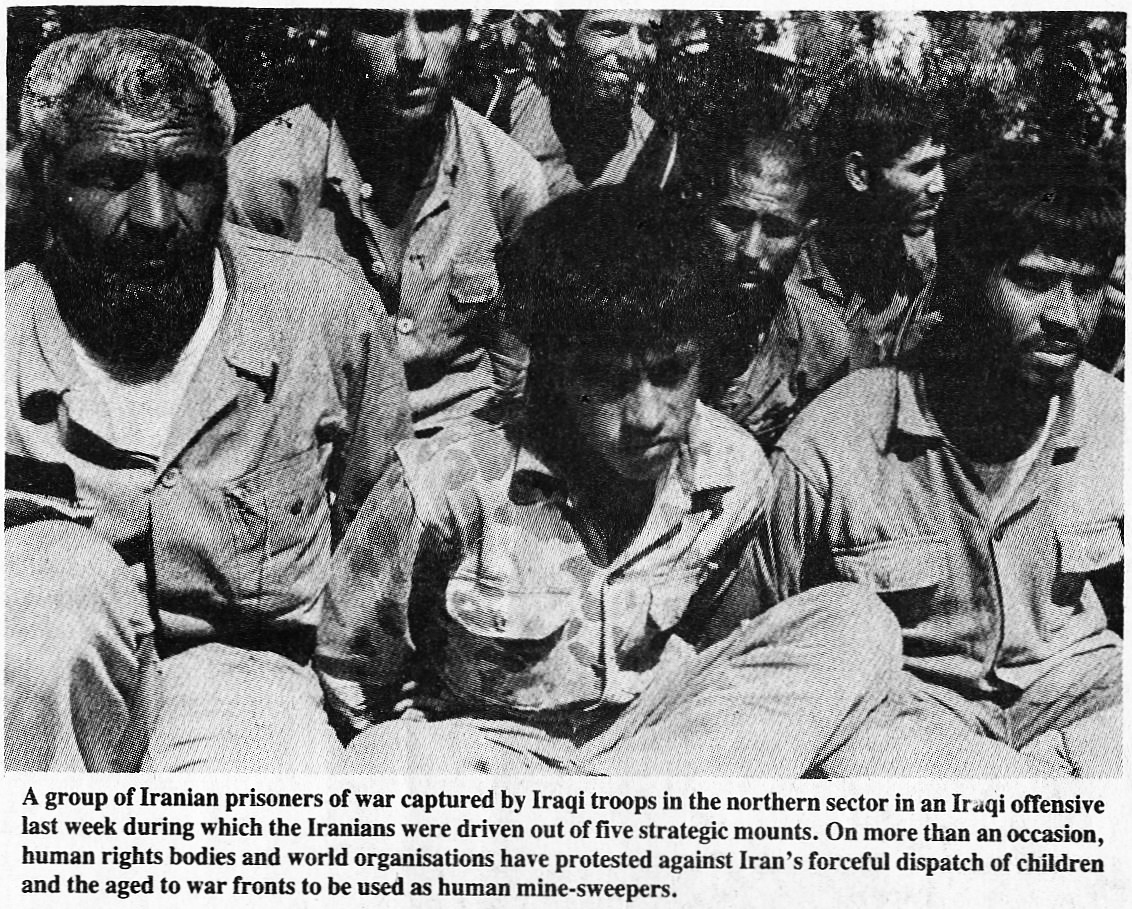
Iranian soldiers captured during Iraq's 1988 offensives

On 25 June, Iraq launched the second Tawakal ala Allah operation against the Iranians on Majnoon Island. Iraqi commandos used amphibious craft to block the Iranian rear, then used hundreds of tanks with massed conventional and chemical artillery barrages to recapture the island after 8 hours of combat. Saddam appeared live on Iraqi television to "lead" the charge against the Iranians. The majority of the Iranian defenders were killed during the quick assault. The final two Tawakal ala Allah operations took place near Amarah and Khaneqan. By 12 July, the Iraqis had captured the city of Dehloran, Iran, along with 2,500 troops and much armour and materiel, which took four days to transport to Iraq. These losses included Iranian tanks, armoured vehicles, self-propelled artillery, towed artillery pieces, and antiaircraft guns. Stephen Pelletiere wrote that "Tawakal ala Allah [...] resulted in the absolute destruction of Iran's military machine."

During the 1988 battles, the Iranians put up little resistance, having been worn out by nearly eight years of war. They lost large amounts of equipment. On 2 July, Iran belatedly set up a joint central command which unified the Revolutionary Guard, Army, and Kurdish rebels, and dispelled the rivalry between the Army and the Revolutionary Guard. However, this came too late and, following the capture of 570 of their operable tanks and the destruction of hundreds more, Iran was believed to have fewer than 200 remaining operable tanks on the southern front, against thousands of Iraqi ones. The only area where the Iranians were not suffering major defeats was in Kurdistan.

=== Iran accepts the ceasefire ===
Saddam sent a warning to Khomeini in mid-1988, threatening to launch a new and powerful full-scale invasion and attack Iranian cities with weapons of mass destruction. Shortly afterwards, Iraqi aircraft bombed the Iranian town of Oshnavieh with poison gas, immediately killing and wounding over 2,000 civilians. The fear of an all-out chemical attack against Iran's largely unprotected civilian population weighed heavily on the Iranian leadership, and they realised that the international community had no intention of restraining Iraq. The lives of the civilian population of Iran were becoming very disrupted, with a third of the urban population evacuating major cities in fear of the seemingly imminent chemical war. Meanwhile, Iraqi conventional bombs and missiles continuously hit towns and cities, destroying vital civilian and military infrastructure. Iran replied with missile and air attacks, but not sufficiently to deter the Iraqis.

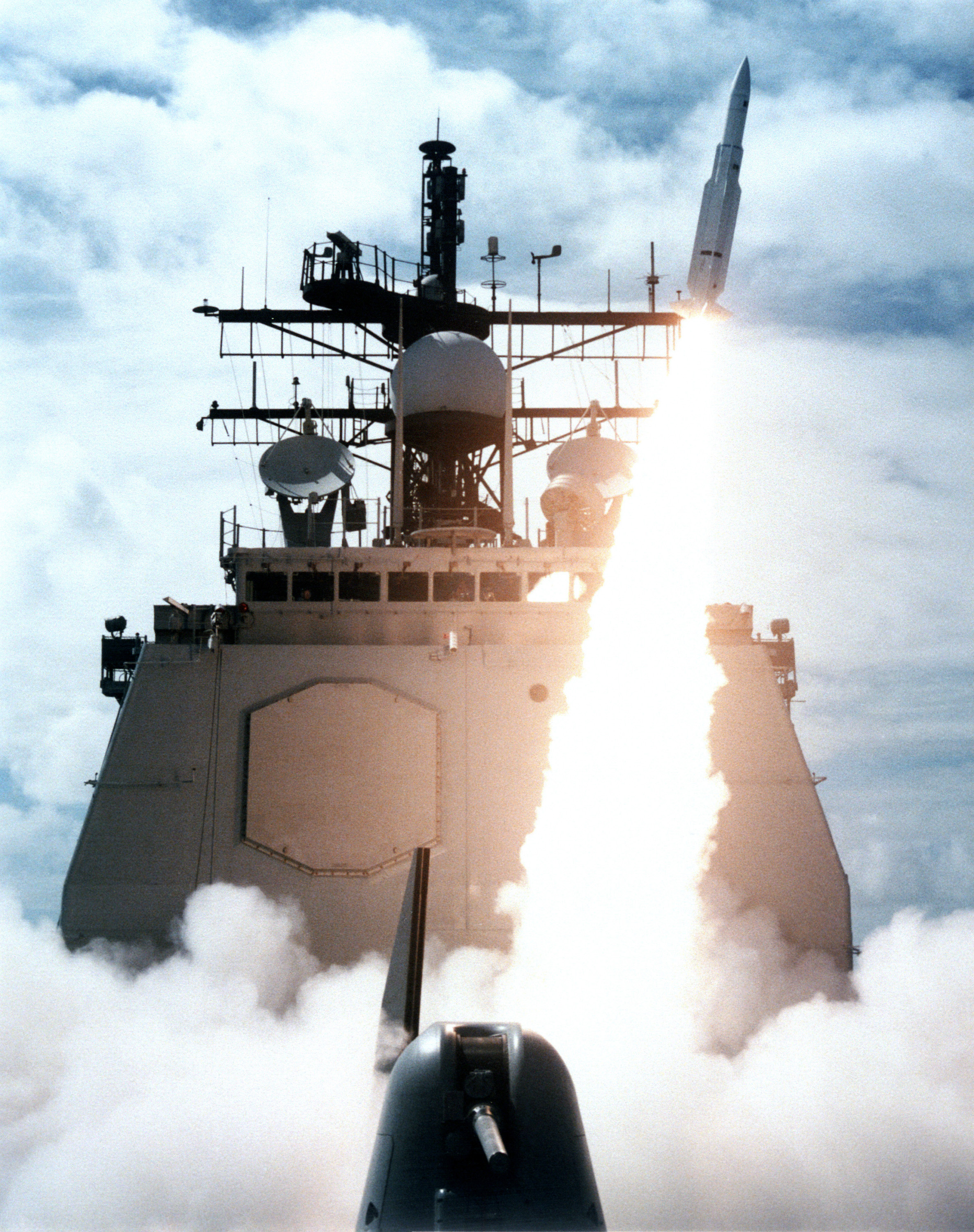
USS Vincennes in 1987 a year before it shot down Iran Air Flight 655

With the threat of a new and even more powerful invasion, Rafsanjani ordered the Iranians to retreat from Haj Omran, Kurdistan on 14 July. The Iranians did not publicly describe this as a retreat, instead calling it a "temporary withdrawal". By July, Iran's army inside Iraq had largely disintegrated. Iraq put up a massive display of captured Iranian weapons in Baghdad, claiming they captured 1,298 tanks, 5,550 recoilless rifles, and thousands of other weapons. However, Iraq had taken heavy losses as well, and the battles were very costly.

In July 1988, Iraqi aircraft dropped bombs on the Iranian Kurdish village of Zardan. Dozens of villages and towns, such as Marivan, Baneh and Saqqez, were once again attacked with poison gas, resulting in even heavier civilian casualties. On 3 July 1988, the USS Vincennes shot down Iran Air Flight 655, killing 290 people. The lack of international sympathy disturbed the Iranian leadership, and they came to the conclusion that the U.S. was on the verge of waging a full-scale war against them, and that Iraq was on the verge of unleashing its entire chemical arsenal upon their cities.

At this point, elements of the Iranian leadership, led by Rafsanjani (who had initially pushed for the extension of the war), persuaded Khomeini to accept a ceasefire. They stated that in order to win the war, Iran's military budget would have to be increased eightfold and the war would last until 1993. On 20 July 1988, Iran accepted Resolution 598, showing its willingness to accept a ceasefire. A statement from Khomeini was read out in a radio address, and he expressed deep displeasure and reluctance about accepting the ceasefire,

Happy are those who have departed through martyrdom. Happy are those who have lost their lives in this convoy of light. Unhappy am I that I still survive and have drunk the poisoned chalice...

The news of the end of the war was greeted with celebration in Baghdad, with people dancing in the streets; in Tehran, however, the end of the war was greeted with a sombre mood.

==== Operation Mersad and end of the war ====
Operation Mersad (مرصاد "ambush") was the last big military operation of the war. Both Iran and Iraq had accepted Resolution 598, but despite the ceasefire, after seeing Iraqi victories in the previous months, MEK decided to launch an attack of its own and wished to advance all the way to Tehran. Saddam and the Iraqi high command decided on a two-pronged offensive across the border into central Iran and Iranian Kurdistan. Shortly after Iran accepted the ceasefire, the MEK army began its offensive, attacking into Ilam province under cover of Iraqi air power. In the north, Iraq also launched an attack into Iraqi Kurdistan, which was blunted by the Iranians.

On 26 July 1988, the MEK started their campaign in central Iran, Operation Forough Javidan (Eternal Light), with the support of the Iraqi army. The Iranians had withdrawn their remaining soldiers to Khuzestan in fear of a new Iraqi invasion attempt, allowing the Mujahedeen to advance rapidly towards Kermanshah, seizing Qasr-e Shirin, Sarpol-e Zahab, Kerend-e Gharb, and Islamabad-e-Gharb. The MEK expected the Iranian population to rise up and support their advance; the uprising never materialised but they reached 145 km (90 mi) deep into Iran. In response, the Iranian military launched its counter-attack, Operation Mersad, under Lieutenant General Ali Sayyad Shirazi. Iranian paratroopers landed behind the MEK lines while the Iranian Air Force and helicopters launched an air attack, destroying much of the enemy columns. The Iranians defeated the MEK in the city of Kerend-e Gharb on 29 July 1988. On 31 July, Iran drove the MEK out of Qasr-e-Shirin and Sarpol Zahab, though MEK claimed to have "voluntarily withdrawn" from the towns. Iran estimated that 4,500 MEK were killed, while 400 Iranian soldiers died.

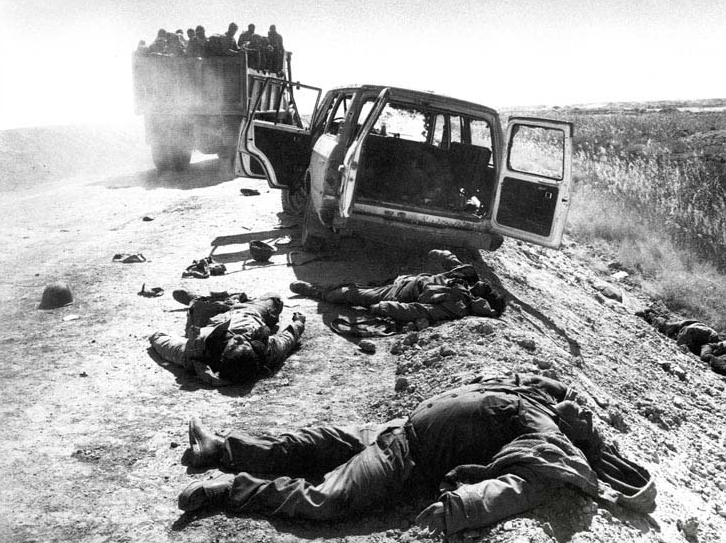
MEK soldiers killed in Operation Mersad, 1988

The last notable combat actions of the war took place on 3 August 1988, in the Persian Gulf when the Iranian navy fired on a freighter and Iraq launched chemical attacks on Iranian civilians, killing an unknown number of them and wounding 2,300. Iraq came under international pressure to curtail further offensives. Resolution 598 became effective on 8 August 1988, ending all combat operations between the two countries. By 20 August 1988, peace with Iran was restored. UN peacekeepers belonging to the UNIIMOG mission took the field, remaining on the Iran–Iraq border until 1991. The majority of Western analysts believe that the war had no winners while some believed that Iraq emerged as the victor of the war, based on Iraq's overwhelming successes between April and July 1988. While the war was now over, Iraq spent the rest of August and early September clearing the Kurdish resistance. Using 60,000 troops along with helicopter gunships, chemical weapons (poison gas), and mass executions, Iraq hit 15 villages, killing rebels and civilians, and forced tens of thousands of Kurds to relocate to settlements. Many Kurdish civilians fled to Iran. By 3 September 1988, the anti-Kurd campaign ended, and all resistance had been crushed. 400 Iraqi soldiers and 50,000–100,000 Kurdish civilians and soldiers had been killed.

At the war's conclusion, it took several weeks for the Armed Forces of the Islamic Republic of Iran to evacuate Iraqi territory to honour pre-war international borders set by the 1975 Algiers Agreement. The last prisoners of war were exchanged in 2003.

The UN Security Council identified Iraq as the aggressor of the war in 1991.

== Aftermath ==
=== Casualties ===
The Iran–Iraq War was the deadliest conventional war ever fought between regular armies of developing countries. Encyclopædia Britannica states: "Estimates of total casualties range from 1,000,000 to twice that number. The number killed on both sides was perhaps 500,000, with Iran suffering the greatest losses." Iraqi casualties are estimated at 105,000–200,000 killed, while about 400,000 had been wounded and some 70,000 taken prisoner. Thousands of civilians on both sides died in air raids and ballistic missile attacks. Prisoners taken by both countries began to be released on 17 August 1990, though some were not released until more than 10 years after the end of the conflict. Cities on both sides had also been considerably damaged. While revolutionary Iran had been bloodied, Iraq was left with a large military and was a regional power, albeit with severe debt, financial problems, and labour shortages.

Iran claimed the war cost them an estimated 200,000–220,000 deaths. Conservative Western estimates put this number at up to 262,000. This includes 123,220 combatants, 60,711 MIA and 11,000–16,000 civilians. Combatants include 79,664 members of the IRGC and 35,170 soldiers from the regular military. Prisoners of war accounted for 42,875 Iranian casualties, captured and kept in Iraqi detention centres from 2.5 to more than 15 years after the war was over.

According to the Janbazan Affairs Organization, 398,587 Iranians sustained injuries that required prolonged medical and health care following primary treatment, including 52,195 (13%) injured due to the exposure to chemical warfare agents. From 1980 to 2012, 218,867 Iranians died due to war injuries and the mean age of combatants was 23 years old. This includes 33,430 civilians (15% of all fatalities), mostly women and children. More than 144,000 Iranian children were orphaned as a consequence of these deaths. On average, 70 people were killed in Iran daily, whereas in addition 1,400 people died from landmines between 1988 and 2003. Other estimates put Iranian casualties up to 600,000.

Both Iraq and Iran manipulated loss figures to suit their purposes. At the same time, Western analysts accepted improbable estimates. By April 1988, such casualties were estimated at between 150,000 and 340,000 Iraqis dead, and 450,000 to 730,000 Iranians. Shortly after the end of the war, it was thought that Iran suffered even more than a million dead. Considering the style of fighting on the ground and the fact that neither side penetrated deeply into the other's territory, USMC analysts believed events do not substantiate the high casualties claimed. The Iraqi government has claimed 800,000 Iranians were killed in action, four times more than Iranian official figures, whereas Iraqi intelligence privately put the number at 228,000–258,000 in August 1986. Iraqi losses were also revised downwards over time.

=== Peace talks and postwar situation ===
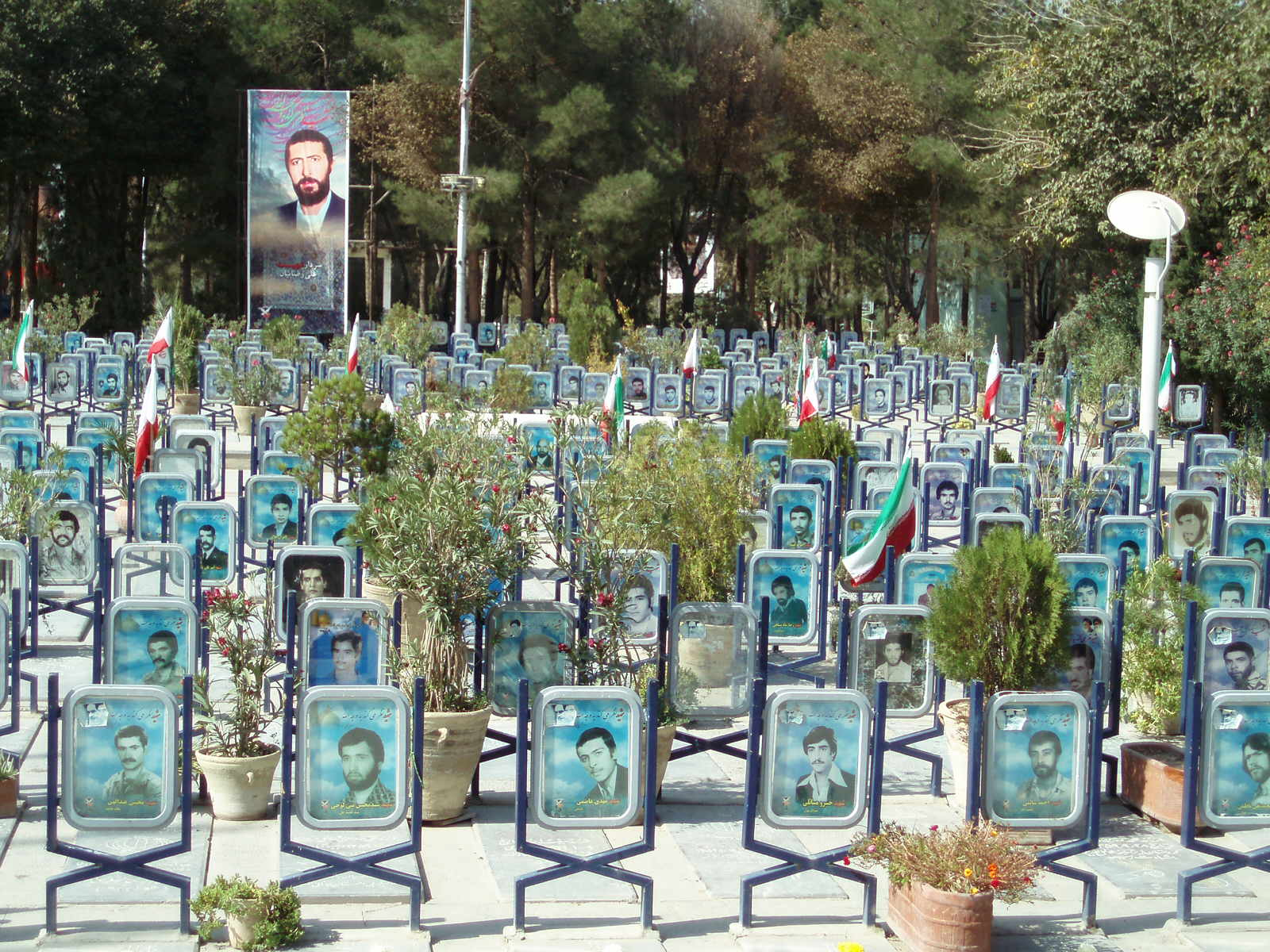
Iranian Martyr Cemetery in Isfahan

With the ceasefire in place, and UN peacekeepers monitoring the border, Iran and Iraq sent their representatives to Switzerland to negotiate a peace agreement on the terms of the ceasefire. However, peace talks stalled. Iraq, in violation of the UN ceasefire, refused to withdraw its troops from 7,800 square kilometres (3,000 sq mi) of disputed marches unless the Iranians accepted Iraq's full sovereignty over the Shatt al-Arab. Foreign powers continued to support Iraq, which wanted to gain at the negotiating table what they failed to achieve on the battlefield, and Iran was portrayed as the one not wanting peace.

In response, Iran refused to release 70,000 Iraqi prisoners of war, compared to 40,000 Iranian prisoners of war held by Iraq. They continued to carry out a naval blockade of Iraq, although its effects were mitigated by Iraqi use of ports in friendly neighbouring Arab countries. Iran began to improve relations with many of the states that opposed it during the war. In 1990, Saddam expressed being open to a peace agreement, although he still insisted on full sovereignty over the Shatt al-Arab.

By 1990, Iran was undergoing military rearmament and reorganisation, and purchased $10 billion worth of heavy weaponry from the USSR and China, including aircraft, tanks, and missiles. Rafsanjani reversed Iran's self-imposed ban on chemical weapons, and ordered their manufacture and stockpile (Iran destroyed them in 1993 after ratifying the Chemical Weapons Convention). As war with the western powers loomed, Iraq became concerned about the possibility of Iran mending its relations with the west in order to attack Iraq. Iraq had lost its support from the West, and its position in Iran was increasingly untenable. Saddam realised that if Iran attempted to expel the Iraqis from the disputed territories in the border area, it was likely they would succeed.

Shortly after his invasion of Kuwait, Saddam recognised Iranian rights over the eastern half of the Shatt al-Arab, and stated that he would accept Iran's demands and withdraw Iraq's military from the disputed territories. A peace agreement was signed finalising the terms of the UN resolution, diplomatic relations were restored, and the Iraqi military withdrew. The UN peacekeepers withdrew from the border afterwards. Most of the prisoners of war were released in 1990, although some remained as late as 2003.

Most analysts consider the war to be a stalemate. Certain analysts believe that Iraq won, on the basis of the successes of their 1988 offensives which thwarted Iran's major territorial ambitions in Iraq and persuaded Iran to accept the ceasefire. Iranian analysts believe that they won the war because although they did not succeed in overthrowing the Iraqi government, they thwarted Iraq's major territorial ambitions in Iran, and that, two years after the war had ended, Iraq permanently gave up its claim of ownership over the entire Shatt al-Arab as well.

In 1991, then-UN Secretary General Javier Pérez de Cuéllar, reported that Iraq's initiation of the war was unjustified, as was its occupation of Iranian territory and use of chemical weapons against civilians. He stated that had the UN accepted this earlier, the war would have almost certainly not lasted as long as it did. Iran, encouraged by the announcement, sought reparations from Iraq, but never received any.

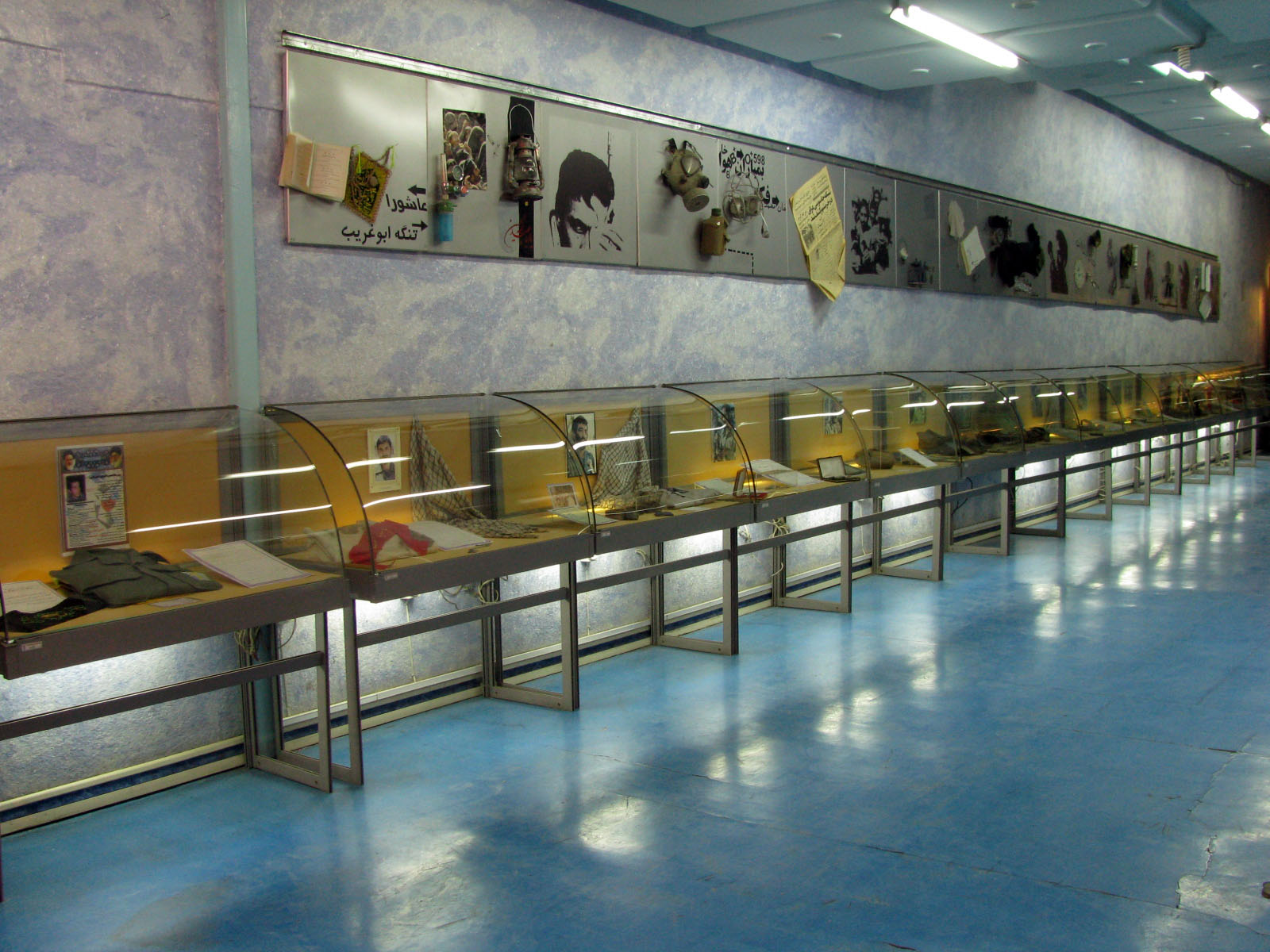
The Iranian Martyrs Museum in Tehran

Throughout the 1990s and early 2000s, Iran and Iraq relations remained balanced between a cold war and a cold peace. Both sides continued to have low level conflicts. Iraq continued to host and support MEK, which repeatedly attacked Iran until the 2003 invasion of Iraq. Iran carried out several airstrikes and missile attacks against mujahideen targets inside of Iraq. In 2005, the new government of Iraq apologised to Iran for starting the war.

=== Economic situation ===
The economic loss at the time was believed to exceed $500 billion for each country ($1.2 trillion total). In addition, economic development stalled and oil exports were disrupted. Iraq had accrued more than $130 billion of international debt, excluding interest, and was also weighed down by a slowed GDP growth. Iraq's debt to the Paris Club amounted to $21 billion, 85% of which had originated from the combined inputs of Japan, the USSR, France, Germany, the United States, Italy and the United Kingdom. The largest portion of Iraq's debt, amounting to $130 billion, was to its former Arab backers, with $67 billion loaned by Kuwait, Saudi Arabia, Qatar, UAE, and Jordan.

After the war, Iraq accused Kuwait of slant drilling and stealing oil, inciting its invasion of Kuwait, which in turn worsened Iraq's financial situation: the United Nations Compensation Commission mandated Iraq to pay reparations of more than $200 billion to victims of the invasion, including Kuwait and the United States. To enforce payment, Iraq was put under a comprehensive international embargo, which further strained the Iraqi economy and pushed its external debt to private and public sectors to more than $500 billion by the end of Saddam's rule. Combined with Iraq's negative economic growth after prolonged international sanctions, this produced a debt-to-GDP ratio of more than 1,000%, making Iraq the most indebted developing country in the world. The unsustainable economic situation compelled the new Iraqi government to request that a considerable portion of debt incurred during the Iran–Iraq war be written off.

=== Science and technology ===
The war had its impact on medical science: a surgical intervention for comatose patients with penetrating brain injuries was created by Iranian physicians treating wounded soldiers, later establishing neurosurgery guidelines to treat civilians who had suffered blunt or penetrating skull injuries.

The Iran–Iraq War contributed to Iraq's defeat in the Persian Gulf War. Iraq's military was accustomed to fighting the slow-moving Iranian infantry formations with artillery and static defences, while using mostly unsophisticated tanks to gun down and shell the infantry and overwhelm the smaller Iranian tank force. In addition, they were also dependent on weapons of mass destruction to help secure victories. Therefore, they were rapidly overwhelmed by the high-tech, quick-manoeuvring Coalition forces using modern doctrines such as AirLand Battle.

== Domestic situation ==
=== Iraq ===
At first, Saddam attempted to ensure that the Iraqi population suffered from the war as little as possible. There was rationing, but civilian projects begun before the war continued. At the same time, the already extensive personality cult around Saddam reached new heights while the regime tightened its control over the military.

After the Iranian victories of the spring of 1982 and the Syrian closure of Iraq's main pipeline, Saddam reversed on his policy towards the home front: a policy of austerity and total war was introduced, with the entire population being mobilised for the war effort. All Iraqis were ordered to donate blood and around 100,000 Iraqi civilians were ordered to clear the reeds in the southern marshes. Mass demonstrations of loyalty towards Saddam became more common. Saddam also began implementing a policy of discrimination against Iraqis of Iranian origin.

In the summer of 1982, Saddam executed more than 300 Iraqi Army officers for their failures on the battlefield. In 1983, a major crackdown was launched on the leadership of the Shia community. Ninety members of the al-Hakim family, an influential family of Shia clerics whose leading members were the émigrés Mohammad Baqir al-Hakim and Abdul Aziz al-Hakim, were arrested, and six were hanged.

The crackdown on Kurds saw the executions of 8,000 members of the Barzani clan, whose head (Massoud Barzani) also led the Kurdistan Democratic Party. From 1983 onwards, a campaign of increasingly brutal repression was started against the Iraqi Kurds, characterised by Israeli historian Efraim Karsh as having "assumed genocidal proportions" by 1988. The Anfal campaign was intended to pacify Iraqi Kurdistan permanently. By 1983, the Barzanis had allied with Iran.

==== Gaining civilian support ====
To secure the loyalty of the Shia population, Saddam allowed more Shias into the Ba'ath Party and the government, and improved Shia living standards, which had been lower than those of the Iraqi Sunnis. Saddam had the state pay for restoring Imam Ali's tomb with Italian white marble. The Baathists also increased their policies of repression against the Shia. The most infamous event was the massacre of 148 civilians of the Shia town of Dujail.

Despite the costs of the war, the Iraqi regime made generous contributions to Shia waqf (religious endowments) as part of the price of buying Iraqi Shia support. The importance of winning Shia support was such that welfare services in Shia areas were expanded during a time in which the Iraqi regime was pursuing austerity in all other non-military fields. During the first years of the war in the early 1980s, the Iraqi government tried to accommodate the Kurds in order to focus on the war against Iran. In 1983, the Patriotic Union of Kurdistan agreed to cooperate with Baghdad, but the KDP remained opposed. In 1983, Saddam signed an autonomy agreement with Jalal Talabani of the Patriotic Union of Kurdistan (PUK), though Saddam later reneged on the agreement. By 1985, the PUK and KDP had joined forces, and Iraqi Kurdistan saw widespread guerrilla warfare for the rest of the war.

=== Iran ===
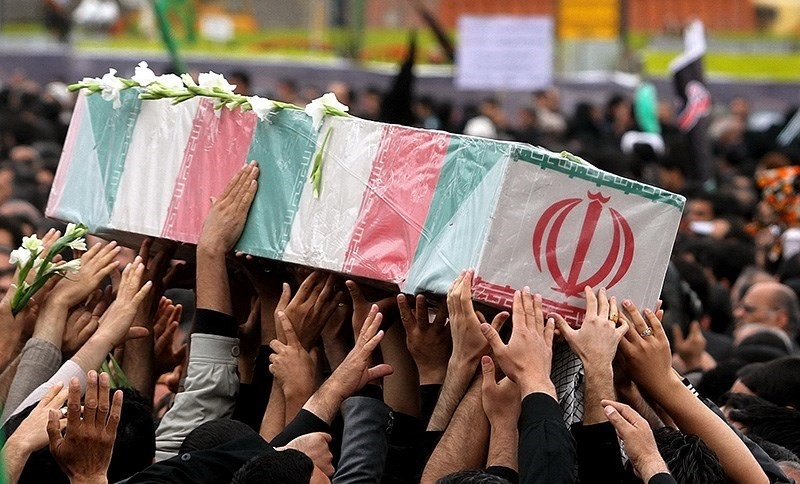
An Iranian soldier's funeral in Mashhad, 2013

Historian Ephraim Karsh argued that the Iranian government saw the outbreak of war as chance to strengthen its position and consolidate the Islamic revolution, noting that government propaganda presented it domestically as a glorious jihad and a test of Iranian national character. Iran followed a policy of total war from the beginning, and attempted to mobilise the nation as a whole. They established a group known as the Reconstruction Campaign, whose members were exempt from conscription, and were instead sent into the countryside to work on farms to replace the men serving at the front.

Iranian workers had a day's pay deducted from their pay cheques every month to help finance the war, and mass campaigns were launched to encourage the public to donate food, money, and blood. To further help finance the war, the Iranian government banned the import of all non-essential items, and launched a major effort to rebuild the damaged oil plants.

Former Iraqi general Ra'ad al-Hamdani said the Iraqis believed that, in addition to the Arab revolts, the Revolutionary Guards would be drawn out of Tehran, leading to a counter-revolution in Iran that would cause Khomeini's government to collapse and thus ensure Iraqi victory. However, rather than turning against the revolutionary government as experts had predicted, Iran's people (including Iranian Arabs) rallied in support of the country and put up a stiff resistance.

The IRGC grew as an organisation to encompass not just military concerns but also matters of economic, religious, and educational importance. The organisation's growth during the war is vital to understanding its role in Iranian society and how it has evolved since its initial formation in 1979. Domestically, the IRGC dealt with suppressing uprisings by Kurds, Baluchs, Turkmen, and the MEK which broke with Khomeini in June 1981. While initially dealing with internal threats to the revolution in its first few years, the IRGC focused its attention on external threats at the outbreak of the war in 1980. In January 1981, the IRGC took control of the Basij to aid in the fight against Iraqi forces. The Basij helped bolster the prominence and legitimacy of the IRGC during the war as a vehicle for indoctrination and through its contributions to the defence of Iran. The transformation of the IRGC organised its command structure, which enabled the organisation to match the force of Iran's regular military and its first abroad deployment during the war began the sponsoring of other armed groups in the region through its command of the Quds force.

==== Civil unrest ====
In June 1981, street battles broke out between the Revolutionary Guard and MEK, continuing for several days and killing hundreds on both sides. In September, more unrest broke out on the streets of Iran as the MEK attempted to seize power. Thousands of left-wing Iranians (many of whom were not associated with the MEK) were shot and hanged by the government. The MEK began an assassination campaign that killed hundreds of regime officials by the fall of 1981. They assassinated the secretary-general of the Islamic Republican Party, Mohammad Beheshti, and Iran's president, Mohammad-Ali Rajai. The government responded with mass executions of suspected MEK members, a practice that lasted until 1985.

In addition to the open civil conflict with the MEK, the Iranian government was faced with Iraqi-supported rebellions in Iranian Kurdistan, which were gradually put down through a campaign of systematic repression. 1985 also saw student anti-war demonstrations, which were crushed by government forces.

==== Economy ====
In 2020, Ali Fadavi stated that Iran spent $19.6 billion in the war. The war furthered the decline of the Iranian economy that had begun with the revolution in 1978–79. Between 1979 and 1981, foreign exchange reserves fell from $14.6 billion to $1 billion. As a result of the war, living standards dropped dramatically, and Iran was described by British journalists John Bulloch and Harvey Morris as "a dour and joyless place" ruled by a harsh regime that "seemed to have nothing to offer but endless war".

Though Iran was becoming bankrupt, Khomeini interpreted Islam's prohibition of usury to mean they could not borrow against future oil revenues to meet war expenses. As a result, Iran funded the war by the income from oil exports after cash had run out. The revenue from oil dropped from $20 billion in 1982 to $5 billion in 1988. French historian Pierre Razoux argued that this sudden drop in economic industrial potential, in conjunction with the increasing aggression of Iraq, placed Iran in a challenging position that had little leeway other than accepting Iraq's conditions of peace.

In 1985, former Iranian prime minister Mehdi Bazargan sent a telegram to the UN, calling the war un-Islamic and illegitimate, and arguing that Khomeini should have accepted Saddam's truce offer in 1982. In a public letter to Khomeini sent in 1988, he added: "Since 1986, you have not stopped proclaiming victory, and now you are calling upon population to resist until victory. Is that not an admission of failure on your part?" Khomeini issued a lengthy public rebuttal in which he defended the war as both Islamic and just.

By 1987, Iranian morale had begun to crumble, reflected in the failure of government campaigns to recruit "martyrs" for the front. Historian Efraim Karsh points to the decline in morale as heavily influencing Iran's acceptance of the ceasefire of 1988.

Not all saw the war in negative terms. The Islamic Revolution of Iran was strengthened and radicalised. The Iranian government-owned Etelaat newspaper wrote, "There is not a single school or town that is excluded from the happiness of 'holy defence' of the nation".

== Comparison of Iraqi and Iranian military strength ==
Iran's regular Army had been purged after the 1979 Revolution, with most high-ranking officers either having fled the country or been executed.

At the beginning of the war, Iraq held a clear advantage in armour, while both nations were roughly equal in terms of artillery. The gap only widened as the war went on. Iran started with a stronger air force, but over time, the balance of power reversed in Iraq's favour (as Iraq was constantly expanding its military, while Iran was under arms sanctions). Estimates for 1980 and 1987 were:

Imbalance of Power (1980–1987)	Iraq	Iran
Tanks in 1980	2,700	1,740 (~500 operable)
Tanks in 1987	4,500+	1,000
Fighter aircraft in 1980	332	445 (205 operable)
Fighter aircraft in 1987	500+	65 (serviceable)
Helicopters in 1980	40	500
Helicopters in 1987	150	60
Artillery in 1980	1,000	1,000+ (~300 operable)
Artillery in 1987	4,000+	1,000+

On average, Iraq imported about $7 billion in weapons during every year of the war, accounting for fully 12% of global arms sales in the period.

The value of Iraqi arms imports increased to between $12 billion and $14 billion during 1984–1987, whereas the value of Iranian arms imports fell from $14 billion in 1985 to $5.89 billion in 1986 and an estimated $6 billion to $8 billion in 1987. Iran was constrained by the price of oil during the 1980s oil glut as foreign countries were largely unwilling to extend credit to Iran, but Iraq financed its continued massive military expansion by taking on vast quantities of debt that allowed it to win a number of victories against Iran near the end of the war but that left the country bankrupt.

Despite its larger population, by 1988 Iran's ground forces numbered only 600,000 whereas the Iraqi army had grown to include 1 million soldiers.

== Foreign support to Iraq and Iran ==
Donald Rumsfeld as the American special envoy to the Middle East meets Saddam in December 1983.

During the war, Iraq was regarded by the West and the Soviet Union as a counterbalance to post-revolutionary Iran. The Soviet Union, Iraq's main arms supplier during the war, did not wish for the end of its alliance with Iraq, and was alarmed by Saddam's threats to find new arms suppliers in the West and China if the Kremlin did not provide him with the weapons he wanted. The Soviet Union hoped to use the threat of reducing arms supplies to Iraq as leverage for forming a Soviet–Iranian alliance.

During the early years of the war, the United States lacked meaningful relations with either Iran or Iraq, the former due to the Iranian revolution and the Iran hostage crisis and the latter because of Iraq's alliance with the Soviet Union and hostility towards Israel. Following Iran's success in repelling the Iraqi invasion and Khomeini's refusal to end the war in 1982, the United States made an outreach to Iraq, beginning with the restoration of diplomatic relations in 1984. The United States wished to both keep Iran away from Soviet influence and protect other Gulf states from any threat of Iranian expansion. As a result, the U.S. began to provide limited support to Iraq.

U.S. official Richard Murphy testified to Congress in 1984 that the Reagan administration believed a victory for either Iran or Iraq was "neither militarily feasible nor strategically desirable".

Support to Iraq was given via technological aid, intelligence, the sale of dual-use chemical and biological warfare related technology and military equipment, and satellite intelligence. While there was direct combat between Iran and the United States, it is not universally agreed that the fighting between the United States and Iran was specifically to benefit Iraq, or for separate issues between the U.S. and Iran. American official ambiguity towards which side to support was summed up by Henry Kissinger when he remarked, "It's a pity they can't both lose."

More than 30 countries provided support to Iraq, Iran, or both; most of the aid went to Iraq. Iran had a complex clandestine procurement network to obtain munitions and critical materials. Iraq had an even larger clandestine purchasing network, involving 10–12 allied countries, to maintain ambiguity over their arms purchases and to circumvent "official restrictions". Arab mercenaries and volunteers from Egypt and Jordan formed the Yarmouk Brigade and participated in the war alongside Iraqis.

=== Iraq ===
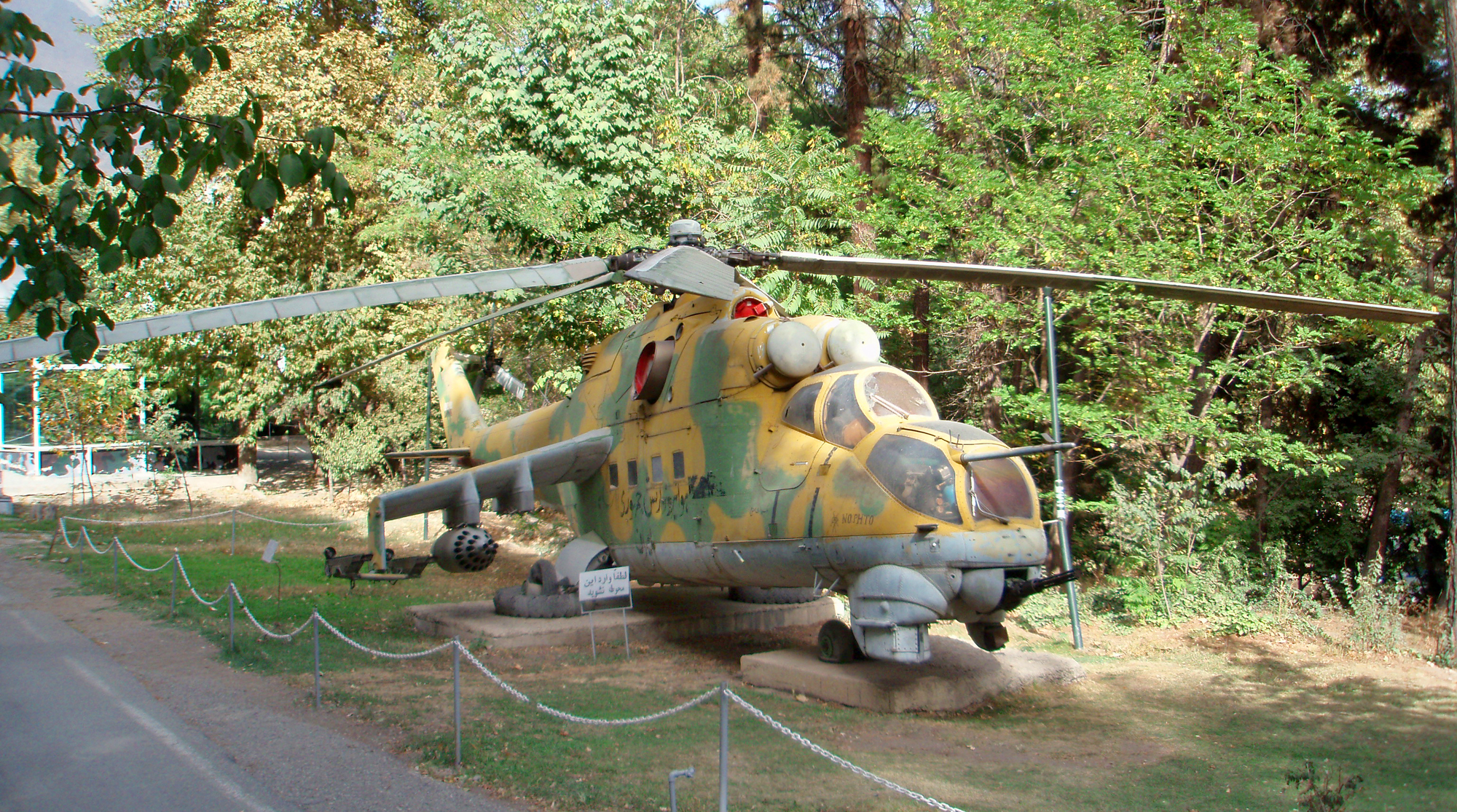
An Iraqi Mil Mi-24 on display at the military museum of Sa'dabad Palace in Iran

The United States pursued policies in favour of Iraq by reopening diplomatic channels, lifting restrictions on the export of dual-use technology, overseeing the transfer of third-party military hardware, and providing operational intelligence on the battlefield. France, which from the 1970s had been one of Iraq's closest allies, was a major supplier of military hardware. The French sold weapons equal to $5 billion, which made up well over a quarter of Iraq's total arms stockpile. France had been sending chemical precursors of chemical weapons to Iraq, since 1986. China, which had no direct stake in the victory of either side and whose interests in the war were entirely commercial, freely sold arms to both sides.

Iraq also made extensive use of front companies, middlemen, secret ownership of all or part of companies all over the world, forged end-user certificates, and other methods to hide what it was acquiring. Some transactions may have involved people, shipping, and manufacturing in as many as 10 countries. Support from Great Britain exemplified the methods by which Iraq would circumvent export controls. Iraq bought at least one British company with operations in the U.K. and the U.S., and had a complex relationship with France and the Soviet Union, its major suppliers of actual weapons.

Turkey took action against the Kurds in 1986, alleging they were attacking the Kurdistan Workers' Party (PKK), which prompted a harsh diplomatic intervention by Iran, which planned a new offensive against Iraq at the time and were counting on the support of Kurdish factions.

Sudan supported Iraq directly during the war, sending a contingent to fight at the frontlines. The Sudanese unit consisted to a large degree of Ugandan refugees.

The United Nations Security Council initially called for a cease-fire after a week of fighting while Iraq was occupying Iranian territory, and renewed the call on later occasions. However, the UN did not come to Iran's aid to repel the Iraqi invasion, and the Iranians thus interpreted the UN as subtly biased in favour of Iraq.

==== Financial support ====
Iraq's main financial backers were the oil-rich Persian Gulf states, most notably Saudi Arabia ($30.9 billion), Kuwait ($8.2 billion), and the United Arab Emirates ($8 billion). In all, Iraq received $35 billion in loans from the West and between $30 and $40 billion from the Persian Gulf states during the 1980s.

The Iraqgate scandal revealed that an American branch of Italy's largest bank, Banca Nazionale del Lavoro (BNL) relied partially on U.S. taxpayer-guaranteed loans to funnel $5 billion to Iraq from 1985 to 1989. In August 1989, when FBI agents raided the Atlanta branch of BNL, branch manager Christopher Drogoul was charged with making unauthorised, clandestine, and illegal loans to Iraq—some of which, according to his indictment, were used to purchase arms and weapons technology. Hewlett-Packard, Tektronix, and Matrix Churchill were among the companies shipping military technology to Iraq under the eye of the U.S. government.

=== Iran ===
While the United States directly fought Iran, citing freedom of navigation as a major casus belli, it also indirectly supplied some weapons to Iran as part of a complex and illegal programme that became known as the Iran–Contra affair. These secret sales were partly to help secure the release of hostages held in Lebanon, and partly to make money to help the Contras rebel group in Nicaragua. This arms-for-hostages agreement turned into a major scandal.

Israel supported Iran in its war against Iraq through the supply of military equipment including spare parts for fighter jets, missile systems, ammunition and tank engines. Israel's motivations for supporting Iran stemmed from a fear of what would have become if Iraq came out victorious and as an opportunity to create business for the Israeli arms industry.

North Korea was a major arms supplier to Iran, often acting as a third party in arms deals between Iran and the Communist bloc. Support included domestically manufactured arms and Eastern-Bloc weapons, for which the major powers wanted deniability. Among the other arms suppliers and supporters of Iran's Islamic Revolution, the major ones were Libya, Syria, and China. China was the largest foreign arms supplier to Iran between 1980 and 1988.

Syria and Libya, breaking Arab solidarity, supported Iran with arms, rhetoric and diplomacy. However, Libya then distanced itself from Iran from 1987, criticising Tehran's attitude and restoring diplomatic relations with Iraq.

=== Aid to both countries ===
Besides the United States and the Soviet Union, Yugoslavia also sold weapons to both countries for the entire duration of the conflict. Likewise, Portugal helped both countries; it was not unusual to see Iranian and Iraqi flagged ships anchored at Setúbal, waiting their turn to dock.

From 1980 to 1987, Spain sold €458 million in weapons to Iran and €172 million to Iraq. Weapons sold to Iraq included 4x4 vehicles, BO-105 helicopters, explosives, and ammunition. A research party later discovered that an unexploded chemical Iraqi warhead in Iran was manufactured in Spain.

Although neither side acquired any weapons from Turkey, both sides enjoyed Turkish civilian trade during the conflict, although the Turkish government remained neutral and refused to support the U.S.-imposed trade embargo on Iran. Turkey's export market jumped from $220 million in 1981 to $2 billion in 1985, making up 25% of Turkey's overall exports. Turkish construction projects in Iraq totalled $2.5 billion between 1974 and 1990. Trading with both countries helped Turkey to offset its ongoing economic crisis, though the benefits decreased as the war neared its end and accordingly disappeared entirely with Iraq's invasion of Kuwait and the resulting Iraq sanctions Turkey imposed in response.

== U.S. involvement ==
American support for Ba'athist Iraq during the Iran–Iraq War, in which it fought against post-revolutionary Iran, included several billion dollars' worth of economic aid, the sale of dual-use technology, non-U.S. origin weaponry, military intelligence, and special operations training. The U.S. refused to sell arms to Iraq directly due to Iraq's ties to terrorist groups, but several sales of "dual-use" technology have been documented; notably, Iraq purchased 45 Bell helicopters for $200 million in 1985. Total sales of U.S. dual-use technology to Iraq are estimated at $500 million.

=== U.S. embargo ===
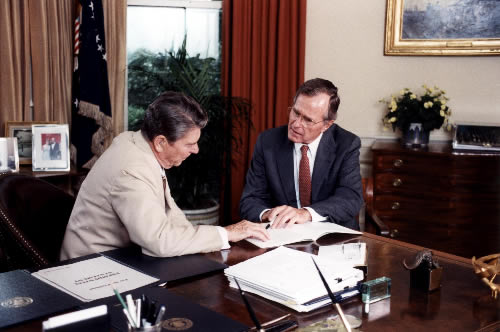
President Ronald Reagan and Vice President George H. W. Bush in the Oval Office in 1984

A key element of U.S. political–military and energy–economic planning occurred in early 1983. The Iran–Iraq war had been going on for three years and there were significant casualties on both sides, reaching hundreds of thousands. Within the Reagan National Security Council concern was growing that the war could spread beyond the boundaries of the two belligerents. A National Security Planning Group meeting then determined that there was a high likelihood that the conflict would spread into Saudi Arabia and other Gulf states, but that the U.S. had little capability to defend the region. It was determined that a prolonged war in the region would induce much higher oil prices and threaten the fragile world recovery which was just beginning to gain momentum. The conclusions were threefold: firstly, oil stocks needed to be increased among members of the International Energy Agency and, if necessary, released early in the event of oil market disruption; second, the United States needed to reinforce the security of friendly Arab states in the region; and thirdly, an embargo should be placed on sales of military equipment to Iran and Iraq. The plan was approved by Reagan, and later affirmed by the other G7 countries.

=== U.S. knowledge of Iraqi chemical weapons use ===
According to Foreign Policy, the "Iraqis used mustard gas and sarin prior to four major offensives in early 1988 that relied on U.S. satellite imagery, maps, and other intelligence. ... According to recently declassified Central Intelligence Agency (CIA) documents and interviews with former intelligence officials like Francona, the U.S. had firm evidence of Iraqi chemical attacks beginning in 1983."

=== Iraqi attack on U.S. warship ===
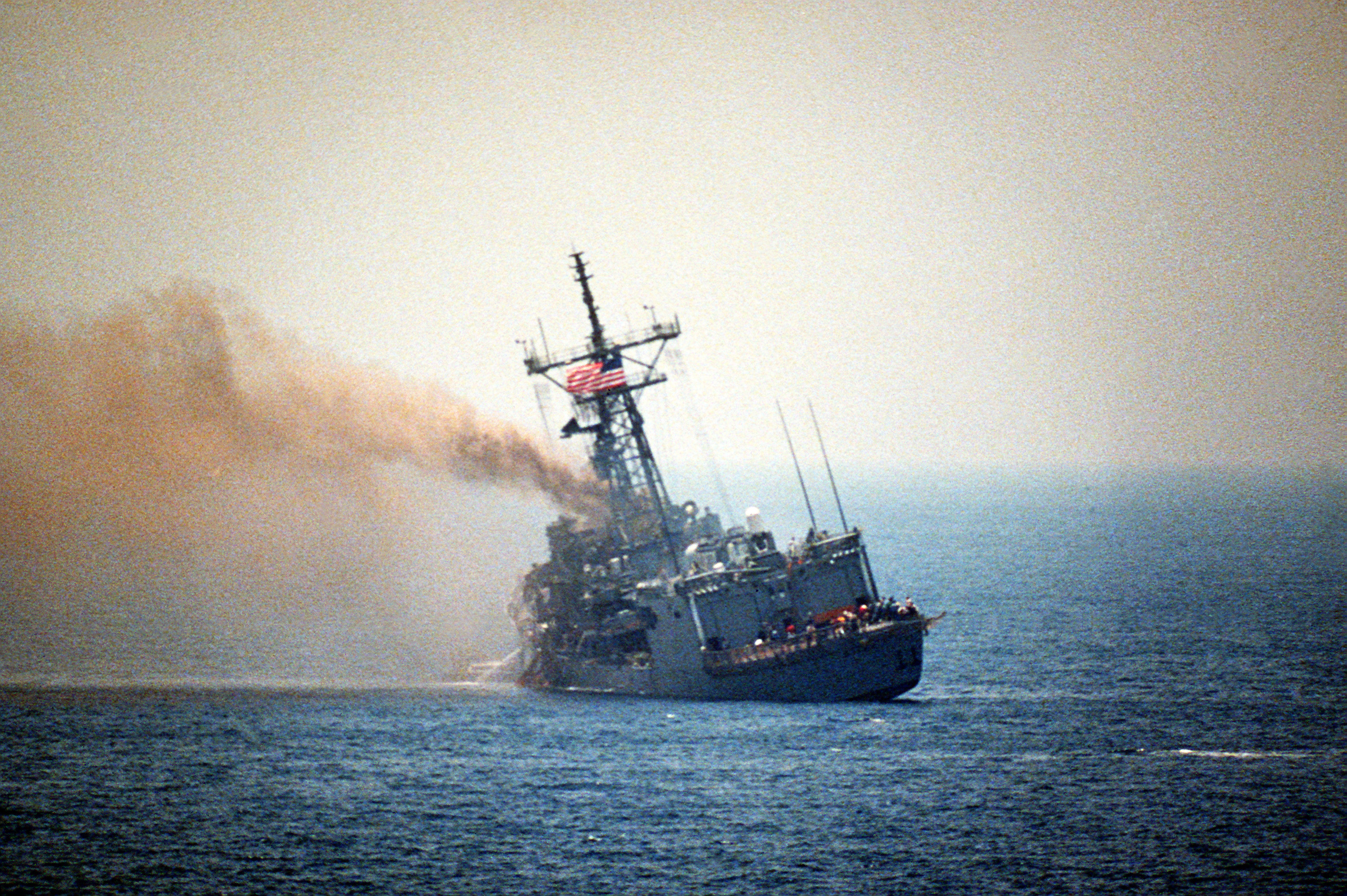
USS Stark listing following two hits by Exocet missiles

In 1987, an Iraqi Dassault Mirage F1 fighter jet launched two Exocet missiles at USS Stark, a Perry class frigate. The second killed 37 crewmen. Whether or not Iraqi leadership authorised the attack is still unknown. Initial claims by the Iraqi government that Stark was inside the Iran–Iraq War zone were shown to be false, and the motives and orders of the pilot remain unanswered. The attack remains the only successful anti-ship missile strike on an American warship.

=== U.S. military actions toward Iran ===
U.S. attention was focused on isolating Iran as well as maintaining freedom of navigation. It criticised Iran's mining of international waters, and sponsored UN Security Council Resolution 598, which passed unanimously on 20 July, under which the U.S. and Iranian forces skirmished during Operation Earnest Will. During Operation Nimble Archer in 1987, the United States attacked Iranian oil platforms in retaliation for an Iranian attack on the U.S.-flagged Kuwaiti tanker Sea Isle City.

In 1988, U.S. Navy sailors aboard USS Samuel B. Roberts were wounded by an Iranian mine. The U.S. responded with Operation Praying Mantis, the Navy's largest engagement of surface warships since World War II. Iranian ships and oil platforms were attacked.

==== Iran Air Flight 655 ====
In 1988, USS Vincennes shot down Iran Air Flight 655, killing all 290 passengers and crew on board. The American government claimed that Vincennes was in international waters at the time (which was later proven to be untrue), that the Airbus A300 had been mistaken for an Iranian F-14 Tomcat, and that Vincennes feared that she was under attack. The Iranians maintain that Vincennes was in their own waters, and that the passenger jet was turning away and increasing altitude after take-off. U.S. Admiral William J. Crowe later admitted that Vincennes was in Iranian territorial waters when it launched the missiles. At the time of the attack, Crowe claimed that the Iranian plane did not identify itself and sent no response to warning signals he had sent. In 1996, the U.S. expressed their regret for the event.

== Iraq's use of chemical weapons ==
Usage of chemical weapons by Iraq against Iran
Year	Number of usage	Chemical agent used				Casualties*	
Year	Number of usage	Mustard	Nerve	Blood	Choking	Killed	Injured
1980	4	Yes	—N/a			20	1
1981	6	Yes	—N/a			101	Unknown
1982	12	Yes	—N/a			Unknown	
1983	64	Yes	—N/a			Unknown	
1984	Unknown	Yes	Yes	Yes	Yes	40	2,225
1985	76	Yes	Yes	Yes	Yes	77	11,644
1986	102	Yes	Yes	Yes	Yes	102	4,720
1987	43	Yes	Yes	Yes	Yes	442	9,440
1988	34	Yes	Yes	Yes	Yes	Unknown	
* The actual casualties may be much higher, as the latency period is as long as 40 years.

In 1991, the CIA estimated that Iran had suffered more than 50,000 casualties from Iraq's use of several chemical weapons, though current estimates are more than 100,000 as the long-term effects continue to cause casualties. The official CIA estimate did not include the civilian population contaminated in bordering towns or the children and relatives of veterans, many of whom developed blood, lung and skin complications. 20,000 Iranian soldiers were killed on the spot by nerve gas. As of 2002, 5,000 of the 80,000 survivors continue to seek regular medical treatment, while 1,000 are hospital inpatients.

According to Iraqi documents, assistance in developing chemical weapons was obtained from firms in many countries, including the United States, West Germany, the Netherlands, the United Kingdom, and France. A report stated that Dutch, Australian, Italian, French and both West and East German companies were involved in the export of raw materials to Iraqi chemical weapons factories. Declassified CIA documents show that the U.S. was providing reconnaissance intelligence to Iraq around 1987–88 which was then used to launch chemical weapon attacks on Iranian troops, and that the CIA fully knew that chemical weapons would be deployed and sarin and cyclosarin attacks followed.

In 1986, the UN Security Council made a declaration stating that "members are profoundly concerned by the unanimous conclusion of the specialists that chemical weapons on many occasions have been used by Iraqi forces against Iranian troops, and the members of the Council strongly condemn this continued use of chemical weapons in clear violation of the Geneva Protocol of 1925, which prohibits the use in war of chemical weapons." The United States was the only member who voted against the issuance of this statement. A mission to the region in 1988 found evidence of the use of chemical weapons, and was condemned in Security Council Resolution 612.

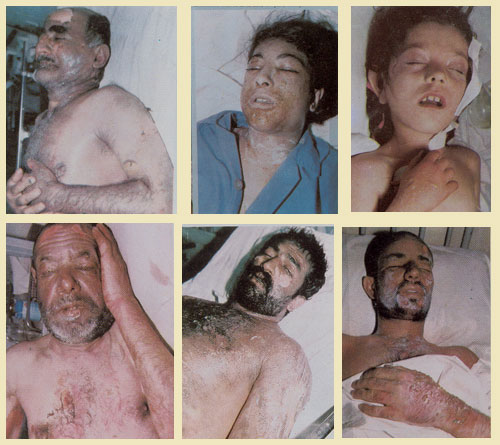
Victims of the 1987 chemical attack on Sardasht, West Azerbaijan, Iran

Former U.S. official W. Patrick Lang stated that "the use of gas on the battlefield by the Iraqis was not a matter of deep strategic concern" to the Reagan administration, because they "were desperate to make sure that Iraq did not lose". He claimed that the Defense Intelligence Agency "would have never accepted the use of chemical weapons against civilians, but the use against military objectives was seen as inevitable in the Iraqi struggle for survival". The Reagan administration did not stop aiding Iraq after receiving reports of the use of poison gas on Kurdish civilians.

The U.S. accused Iran of using chemical weapons as well, though the allegations have been disputed. Joost Hiltermann, a former Human Rights Watch official, said that literature on the Iran–Iraq War mentions allegations of Iranian chemical attacks, but are "marred by a lack of specificity as to time and place, and the failure to provide any sort of evidence".

Analysts Gary Sick and Lawrence Potter have called the allegations against Iran "mere assertions" and stated, "No persuasive evidence of the claim that Iran was the primary culprit [of using chemical weapons] was ever presented." Policy consultant and author Joseph Tragert stated, "Iran did not retaliate with chemical weapons, probably because it did not possess any at the time". Documents uncovered after the 2003 invasion of Iraq show that Iraqi military intelligence was not aware of any large-scale chemical attacks by Iranian forces, although a March 1987 document describes five small-scale chemical attacks perpetrated by the Iranians (four involving mustard gas and one involving phosgene, with the likely source being captured Iraqi munitions), and there are also reports of Iranian use of tear gas and white phosphorus.

In 2006, Saddam said he would take responsibility "with honour" for any attacks on Iran using conventional or chemical weapons during the war, but that he took issue with the charges that he ordered attacks on Iraqis.

During the war, the United Nations Security Council issued statements that "chemical weapons had been used in the war". UN statements never clarified that only Iraq was using chemical weapons, and according to retrospective authors "the international community remained silent as Iraq used weapons of mass destruction against Iranian[s] as well as Iraqi Kurds." A 1987 UN report conducted at the behest of both belligerents discovered weapon fragments that established Iraqi responsibility for chemical attacks on Iranian soldiers and civilians, but could not substantiate Iraq's allegations of Iranian chemical weapons use: "Iraqi forces have been affected by mustard gas and a pulmonary element, possibly phosgene. In the absence of conclusive evidence of the weapons used, it could not be determined how the injuries were caused."

Evidence suggests that these Iraqi chemical casualties were likely the result of "blowback", whereas the evidence that Iraq submitted to the UN did not withstand scrutiny; UN official Iqbal Riza later acknowledged that Iraq's evidence was "clearly fabricated". However, the report's phrasing—"chemical weapons were again used against Iranian forces by Iraqi forces ... now also Iraqi forces have sustained injuries from chemical warfare"—contributed to an erroneous perception that Iran and Iraq were equally at fault.

In response to further Iraqi chemical attacks on Kurdish civilians after the August 1988 ceasefire with Iran, comprehensive U.S. economic sanctions against Iraq were passed by the U.S. Senate. It then faced strong opposition within the House of Representatives, and did not become law. The State Department advised against sanctions.

== Legacy and memory ==
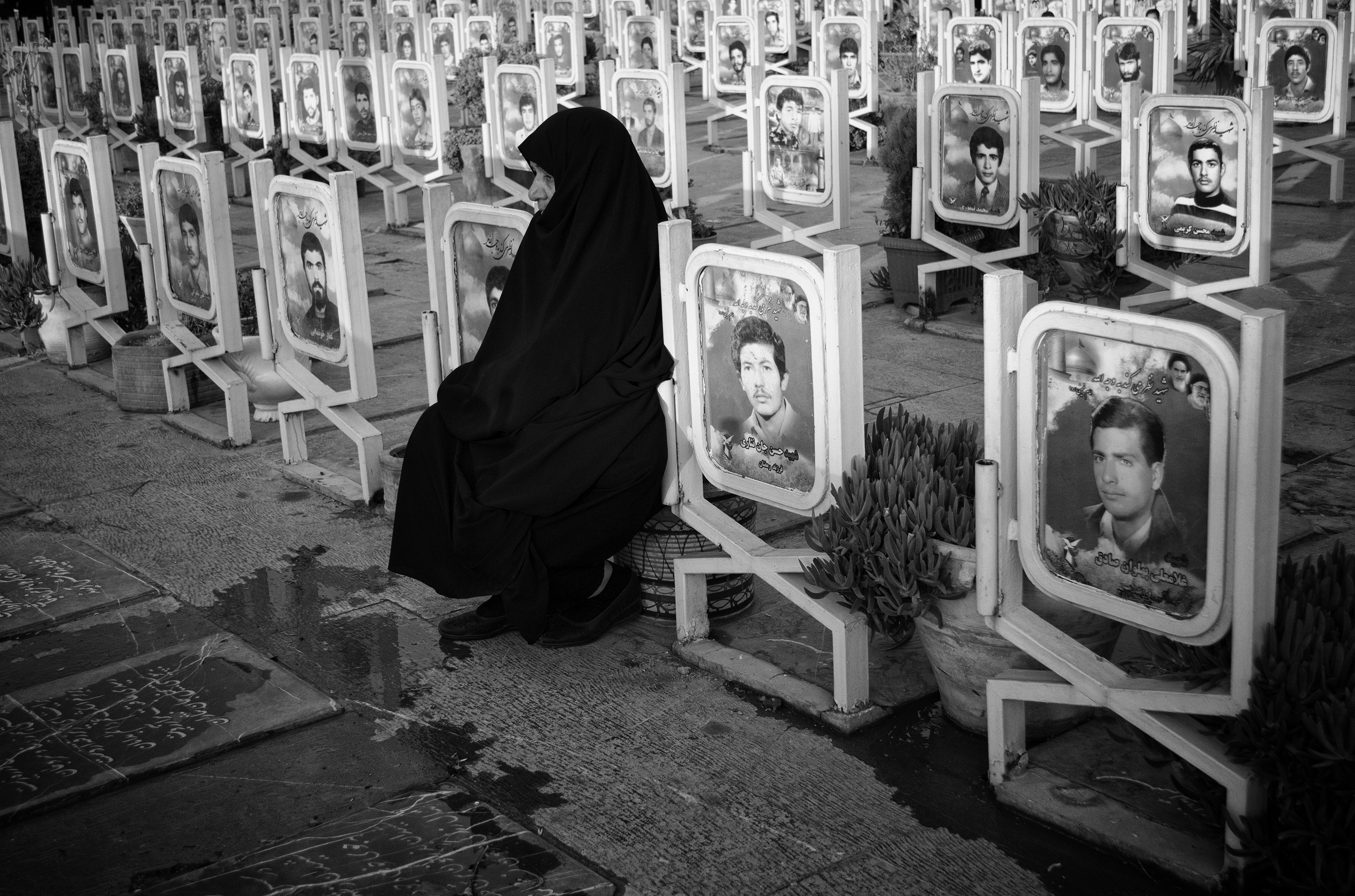
An Iranian mother mourning her son in a military cemetery in Isfahan, 2011.

Former CIA analyst Bruce Riedel describes the Iran–Iraq War as "one of the largest and longest conventional interstate wars" of the twentieth century and "the only war in modern times in which chemical weapons were used on a massive scale".

Iran's attack on the Osirak nuclear reactor in 1980 was the first attack on a nuclear reactor and one of only a small handful of military attacks on nuclear facilities in history. It was also the first instance of a pre-emptive attack on a nuclear reactor to forestall the development of a nuclear weapon, though it did not achieve its objective, as France repaired the reactor after the attack.

The war was the first conflict in the history of warfare in which both forces used ballistic missiles against each other. This war also saw the only confirmed air-to-air helicopter battles in history, with Iraqi Mi-25s fighting Iranian AH-1J SeaCobras on several occasions.

The war is regarded as being a major trigger for rising sectarianism in the region, as it was viewed by many as a clash between Sunni Muslims (Ba'athist Iraq and other Arab states) and the Shia revolutionaries that had recently taken power in Iran. There remains lingering animosity however despite the pragmatic alliance that has been formed as multiple government declarations from Iran have stated that the war will "affect every issue of internal and foreign policy" for decades to come.

The sustained importance of this conflict is attributed mostly to its massive human and economic cost, along with its ties to the Iranian Revolution. Another significant effect that the war has on Iran's policy is the issue of remaining war reparations. In 2004, the UN estimated that Iraq owed about $149 billion, while Iran contended that, with both the direct and indirect effects taken into account, the cost of the war reached $1 trillion.

== See also ==
- Arms-to-Iraq affair
- Iran–Contra affair
- Women in the Iran–Iraq War
- List of extensive Iranian ground operations in the Iran–Iraq War
