= Operation Badr (1985) =

1985 military operation during the Iran-Iraq war

Coordinates: 31.0158°N 47.4306°E

- Part of Iran–Iraq War
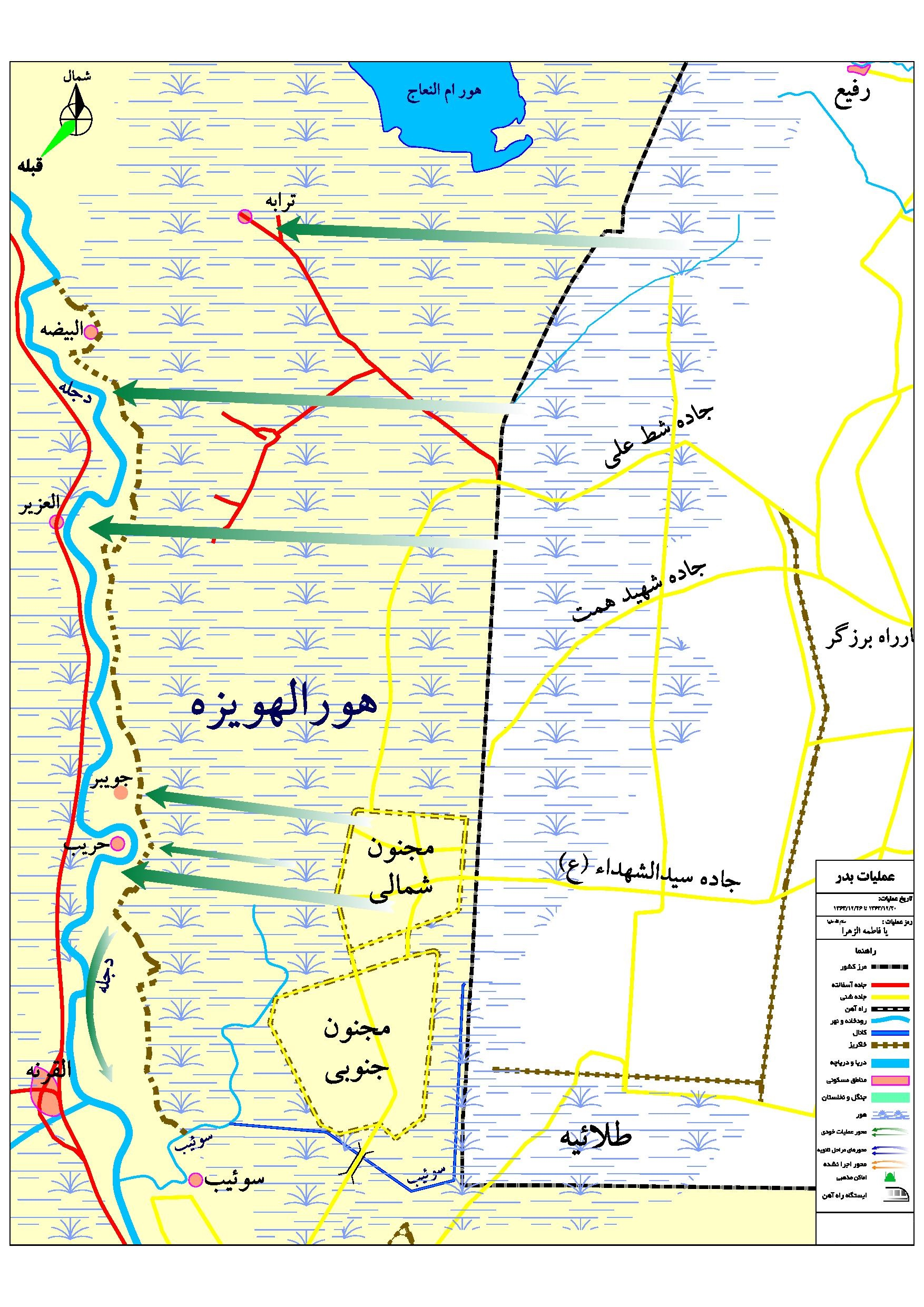
Date	10 – 20 March 1985 (1 week and 3 days)
Location	Northeast of Al-Qurnah
Result	Iraqi victory
Territorial changes	Iran temporarily captures parts of the Baghdad–Basra highway but is forced to abandon control due to an Iraqi counter-response

Belligerents
Iraq	Iran

Commanders and leaders
(Ba'athist Iraq) Gen. Sultan Hashim Ahmad al-Tai (Ba'athist Iraq) Gen. Jamal Zanoun (Ba'athist Iraq) Gen. Hisham Sabah al-Fakhri	(Iran) Mohsen Rezaee (Iran) Mehdi Bakeri (MIA)

Strength
40,000–60,000 soldiers	100,000 soldiers

Casualties and losses
2,000 killed 6,000 wounded 3,000 captured 100 tanks, 11 helicopters and 4 aircraft lost	10,000 killed 20,000 wounded 2,000 captured 100 armored vehicles and 24 helicopters lost

Operation Badr was an Iranian operation conducted during the Iran–Iraq War against the forces of Ba'athist Iraq. The Iranians launched their offensive on March 10 and succeeded in capturing a part of the Basra-Amarah-Baghdad highway. The following Iraqi counterattack, however, forced the Iranians out in a continual war of endless stalemate.

== Prelude ==
After its failure to capture Basra in 1982, Iran launched Operation Kheibar in 1984 to capture the Baghdad-Basra highway. This resulted in the Battle of the Marshes, and the operation failed, but Iran planned for Operation Badr in a further attempt to capture it. Without coincidence, the operation was named after the Prophet Muhammad’s first military victory, which took place near the town of Badr centuries earlier.

The aim of the offensive was focused on capturing the Baghdad-Basra highway, which was a vital link between the two major cities, and for the movement of military supplies and vehicles to support and replenish the Iraqi defenders at the front-line. Another objective included the crossing of the Tigris River, which would cut off Basra from Iraq and give an equally psychological blow to the country. This operation was similar to Operation Kheibar, except it consisted of far superior planning. Iran used 100,000 troops, and 60,000 more in reserve. Iran assessed the marshy terrain and plotted points where to land tanks. Iran also would construct pontoon bridges across the marshes. The Basij forces were also equipped with anti-tank weapons.

Iran found itself reorganizing the Pasdaran and Basij units into more conventional forces as a response to several failures in the past. Although highly motivated and outnumbered the Iraqis, the Iranians were poorly trained and lacked heavy equipment, including armor, artillery, and air support to back up the operation. At the same time, Iran was also suffering the effects of the U.S.'s Operation Staunch embargo. Conversely, the Iraqis, under the command of General Hisham Sabah al-Fakhri, said that he had never used chemical weapons. However, when speaking to journalists, he said he did not know if chemical weapons were available within his command.

== The battle ==
Operation Badr commenced on the night of March 10, 1985, with an artillery strike on Al Basrah. The next night, Pasdaran and Basij forces advanced through the marshes to catch the Iraqi defenders off guard to the north of Al Qurnah. On March 11, Iran sent in a force of 100,000 men to attack the vicinity of Majnoon Island; this force landed at al-Qurnah, where the Tigris River skirts the highway and made a charge for it, succeeding in its partial capture, in response to which Iraq opened a counterattack with artillery, air strikes and armor divisions from the north. This battle was the first time that units of the Republican Guard were employed as reserve forces. The Iranians attacked from the Majnoun Islands, once again taking the Iraqis by surprise, striking at the southern end of Iraq's 4th army corps, on a 12 km wide front.

The Iranian offensive broke through the Iraqi lines, the Revolutionary Guard, with the support of tanks and artillery broke through the north of Qurna on 14 March. Two days into the offensive, the Iranians penetrated 16 km (10 miles) into Iraq; that same night 30,000 Iranian troops reached the Tigris River and crossed it using three pontoon bridges, one of which was capable of supporting heavy vehicles. Thus they succeeded in capturing part of the Baghdad-Basra Highway 6, which had eluded them during Operations Dawn 5 and Dawn 6; however, while being successful the Iranians had dangerously overextended themselves, and were still suffering from shortages of armor.

Saddam Hussein responded by launching chemical attacks (tabun agent) against the Iranian positions along the highway and by initiating the second "war of the cities", with an air and missile campaign against twenty Iranian population centres, including Tehran. The Iraqis had attempted to cause heavy Iranian casualties during the battle by channeling their infantry into pre-set artillery 'kill zones'; this counterattack was launched after the Iranians had reached their objective.

Iraqi reserves, including elite Republican Guard units, launched a counteroffensive against the Iranians from three directions. Iraqi airstrikes and intense artillery bombardments, using both high explosives and chemical agents, hammered the Iranian position. After two days of relentless Iraqi assaults, the Pasdaran forces were forced to withdraw into the marshes. Iran's casualties were estimated between eleven thousand and seventeen thousand soldiers.

A short time after the initial attack on the highway, Iran had planned to launch a diversionary one against another area, but it began too late and it too was defeated.

Thus the Iranians were eventually driven out of their positions, and the highway was retaken by the Iraqis.

== Aftermath ==
In response to Operation Badr, Saddam opened the second "War of the Cities" during March of that year, hitting cities as far as Isfahan, Tabriz, Shiraz, and even Tehran. Iran responded in kind with attacks of their own against Iraq, mostly by launching shells and medium range missiles at the port city of Basra.

While this was not successful due to shortages in Iranian armor and air power, it convinced the Iranian leadership that their tactics were still good, as they had managed to get so far into Iraq. The Iraqis were also convinced their tactics were sound as well. Due to Iran's lack of heavy weaponry, they would suffer during Iraqi counterattacks with heavy weapons.

With experiences gained during this battle and the earlier Battle of the Marshes, Iran launched the successful Operation Dawn 8, capturing the Faw Peninsula.

== See also ==
- Operation Quds-1

== Bibliography ==
1. In The Name Of God: The Khomeini Decade, by Robin Wright, Simon and Schuster, 1989
2. The Iran–Iraq War: Chaos in a Vacuum, by Stephen C. Pelletiere, Praeger Publications, New York, NY, 1992.
