= Battle of Al Faw =

Battle of Al Faw may refer to:

- First Battle of al-Faw (1986), during the Iran–Iraq War
- Second Battle of al-Faw (1988), during the Iran–Iraq War
- Battle of Al Faw (2003), during the Iraq War
