= Tawakalna ala Allah Operations =

1988 Iraqi offensives in the Iran–Iraq War

- Part of Iran–Iraq War
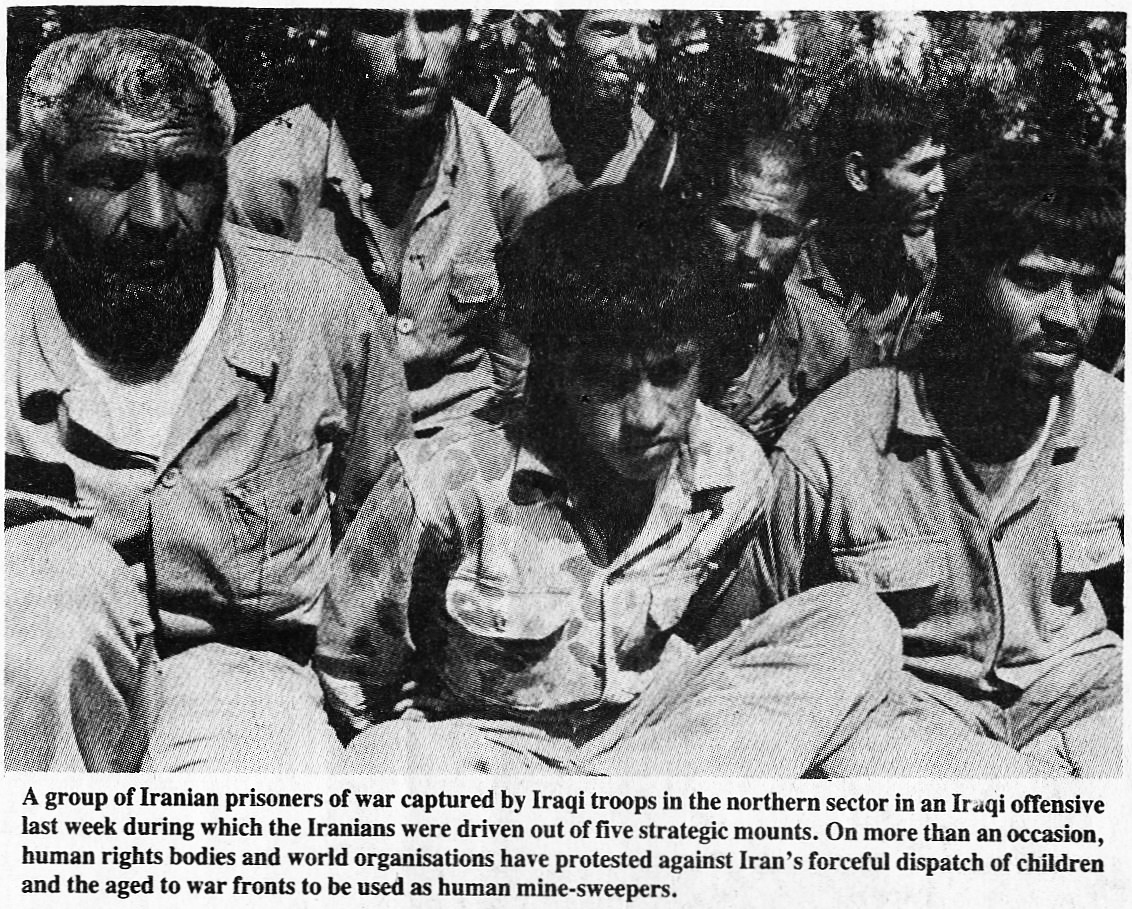
- Iranian soldiers captured during the Iraqi 1988 offensives
Date	17 April – July 1988
Location	Around the Iran–Iraq border
Result	Iraqi victory: Complete elimination of Iranian forces in Iraq (liberating 4,400sq.km); Renewed Iraqi invasion of Iran, resulting in the capture of dozens of towns (occupying 9,600sq.km); Iran's submission to a United Nations resolution regarding a ceasefire with Iraq, ultimately leading to the end of the Iran–Iraq War.
Territorial changes	Iraqi forces regain control over all Iraqi territory previously held by Iranian forces, and launch a series of offensives into Iran leading to the capture of dozens of cities and towns along the border

Belligerents
Iraq	Iran

Commanders and leaders
(Iraq) Saddam Hussein (Iraq) Gen. al-Rashid (Note: (Command & 7th Corps)) (Iraq) Lt. Gen. al-Rawi (Note: Republican Guard) (Iraq) Mj. Gen. Mahmoud (Note: (3rd Corps)	(Iran) Ruhollah Khomeini (Iran) Akbar Rafsanjani (Iran) Mohsen Rezaee (Iran) Colonel Ali Shahbazi

Units involved
Republican Guard; 7th Corps; 4th Corps; 3rd Corps; Special Forces; 16th and 3rd brigades	Islamic Republic of Iran Army; Islamic Republic of Iran Ground Forces; Islamic Revolutionary Guard Corps; Basij

Strength
100,000–135,000 soldiers in action 1,500,000 total soldiers 5,500 tanks 900 aircraft	60,000–100,000 soldiers in action 300,000 total soldiers 400 tanks 55 operational aircraft

Casualties and losses
5,000 casualties	28,000 casualties 20,000 captured 90 tanks destroyed 600 tanks, 400 AFVs, 20 SSMs, 400 various AA guns captured

Operation Tawakalna ala Allah (Arabic: عمليات توكلنا على الله, romanized: tawakkalnā ‘alā llāh, Operations “We Put Trust In God") were a series of five highly successful Iraqi offensives launched in April 1988 and lasting until July 1988. (Note: The offensives consisted of the Second Battle of al-Faw, the Battle of Fish Lake, the Battle of the Majnoon Islands, the Battle of Dehloran, and the Battle of Qasre Shirin.) Iraq had originally only intended to retake the al-Faw peninsula it had lost to Iran, but following the battles' extraordinary success due to the complete collapse of the Iranian troops present, the Iraqi command decided to expand the battle into a larger offensive campaign, ultimately leading to the expulsion of all Iranian forces present within Iraq and subsequent renewed invasion of Iran.

== Prelude ==
Following the Iranian Karbala campaigns of 1987, but before the end of summer, the Iraqi Army started secretly practicing maneuvers in the desert behind Basra. The training maneuvers involved multiple Army and Republican Guards divisions and huge mock-ups of objectives Iraq intended to seize back from Iran.

The Iranian failure during the Karbala Campaign of the previous year had dented the Iranian military's manpower, supplies, and morale, and as a result increasing numbers of Iranians were turning against the war. This meant that the Iranian military's mobilization attempt for a renewed offensive against Iraq in 1988 had failed. The Iranian military leadership had also decided at a major strategic conference that the Iranian troops had to undertake extensive retraining and rearming in order to defeat Iraq, which could in turn take up to 5 years. As a result, Iran did not make any new attempts to invade Iraq in 1988. In addition, Iran began to focus on creating an insurgency inside of Iraq, similar to the Viet Cong during the Vietnam War. They were successful in doing so in Iraqi Kurdistan.

== The Battles ==
=== Second Battle of al-Faw ===
The al-Faw peninsula had been under Iranian control since 1986 when they launched a surprise attack on the peninsula as part of the larger Operation Dawn 8.

The taking of the peninsula by the Iranians was a strong blow to Iraq's prestige whilst also threatening Basra from the south-east. The retaking of the peninsula was seen by Saddam Hussein as a top priority, and Iraqi General Maher Abd al-Rashid promised to recover the peninsula, going so far as to offer his daughter Sahar to Saddam's son Qusay to show his certainty. Planning for the recovery of the peninsula began soon after it had been taken by the Iranians, and was largely done in secret by a small group of six, with Saddam Hussein himself being heavily involved in the planning process. The operation was called "Operation Ramadan Mubarak", which later would become included as a part of the Tawakal ala Allah operations due to its success.

For the second battle of Faw the Iraqis had concentrated over 100,000 soldiers, of whom approximately 60% were Republican Guard, against some 15,000 Iranian Basij volunteers. The Iraqi command had expected the battle to take several weeks, but Iraqi forces seized the peninsula in a single day with only minimal losses, due to the collapse of the Iranian units present. This stunning success led the Iraqi command to expand the original battle into a larger offensive campaign against Iran.

The attack on al-Faw was preceded by Iraqi diversionary attacks in northern Iraq, with a massive artillery and air barrage of Iranian front lines. Key areas, such as supply lines, command posts, and ammunition depots, were hit by a storm of mustard gas and nerve gas, as well as by conventional explosives. Helicopters landed Iraqi commandos behind Iranian lines while the main Iraqi force attacked in a frontal assault. Within 48 hours, all of the Iranian forces had been killed or cleared from the al-Faw Peninsula.[43] The day was celebrated in Iraq as Faw Liberation Day throughout Saddam's rule. The Iraqis had planned the offensive well. Prior to the attack the Iraqi soldiers gave themselves poison gas antidotes to shield themselves from the effect of the saturation of gas. The heavy and well executed use of chemical weapons was the decisive factor in the Iraqi victory.[101] Iraqi losses were a little more than 1,000.

To the shock of the Iranians, rather than breaking off the offensive, the Iraqis kept up their drive, and a new force attacked the Iranian positions around Basra. Following this, sensing Iranian weakness, the Iraqis launched a sustained drive to clear the Iranians out of all of southern Iraq.

One of the most successful Iraqi tactics was the "one-two punch" attack using chemical weapons. Using artillery, they would saturate the Iranian front line with rapidly dispersing nerve gas, while longer-lasting mustard gas was launched via fighter-bombers and rockets against the Iranian rear, creating a "chemical wall" that blocked reinforcement

=== Battle of Fish Lake ===
At 9:30am on 25 May 1988, Iraq launched what became known as Tawakalna 1, consisting of one of the largest artillery barrages in history, coupled with chemical weapons. The marshes had previously been dried by a mixture of drought and Iraqi engineering, despite Iranian attempts at refilling the marshes. The drying of the marshes allowed the Iraqis to use tanks more effectively to bypass and then crush Iranian field fortifications. The Iraqi forces deployed consisted of possibly up to 135,000 men composed of various elements of the Republican Guard and 3rd Corps, attacking along a 15-mile front. Iraqi numerical superiority in infantry compared to the Iranians was around 4 to 1. Iraqi forces attacked Iranian positions at Fish Lake, at a point east of Basra, and to a lesser extent at a point further to the north.

Iran's defenses consisted of trenches, sand mounts, anti-tank ditches, barbed wire, and minefields.

Iraqi forces drove across the Jassem canal, on the Basra-Khorramshahr road, and cleared a 15-mile corridor to the east and southeast following. Initial Iranian resistance was stiff, with Iraqi forces taking some casualties when first penetrating the Iranian defenses. Following an Iranian counterattack which was repulsed, a renewed Iraqi offensive utilizing helicopters and chemical weapons forced a hasty withdrawal, with some reports suggesting that the Iranians fell back in disarray.

Iran suffered somewhere in the region of six to eight times the casualties felt by Iraq. Iraqi forces thus managed to expel the Iranians after less than 10 hours of combat due to weak resistance. The Iranian forces were pushed all the way across the border, which Iran had captured at the cost of 65,000 casualties just a year earlier. In addition, the Iranians were permanently driven away from Basra. The battle dealt a heavy blow to Iranian morale, with recruitment dropping off by 70%. The loss of equipment also affected Iran due to its difficulty in replacing armoured units.

=== Iranian counterattack ===
Faced with such losses, Khomeini appointed the cleric Hashemi Rafsanjani as the Supreme Commander of the Armed Forces, though he had in actuality occupied that position for months. Rafsanjani desperately ordered a hasty counter-attack called Operation Beit al-Moqaddas-7, which was launched 12–15 June 1988. The Iranians, counter-attacked with a force of 20,000–25,000 Revolutionary Guards in formations of as many as 50 battalions, and managed to strike Saddam's presidential palace in Baghdad using fighter aircraft.[12] After 3 days of fierce fighting which decimated the Revolutionary Guards force, the Iranians were driven back as the Iraqis launched 650 helicopter and 300 aircraft ground-attack sorties. The offensive showed that Iran still had the ability to fight back. At the same time it showed that Iran had done little to improve its military capabilities, leaning on revolutionary orthodoxy instead of military professionalism.

=== Second Battle of the Majnoon Islands ===
On 25 June, Iraq launched the second Tawakal ala Allah operation liberating Majnoon Island. Hundreds of tanks were used against the Iranians, with Iraqi heavy weaponry present outnumbering that of Iranian forces up to a factor of 20 to 1. The Iraqi Republican Guard forces had prepared for the battle by launching attacks against mockups of the island. The attack began with one of the largest artillery barrages in history, coupled with large amounts of poison gas, incapacitating many of the defenders. The Iraqi air force provided close support by performing 400 ground-attack sorties. Iran committed 35 fighter aircraft in an attempt to counter-act Iraq's combined air and artillery support while at the same time attempting to hinder the advance of Iraqi forces, but the Iranians were overwhelmed in the sky and on the ground. Iraqi commandos using amphibious craft blocked the rear of the island. Some reports also indicate that a brigade of Iraqi paratroopers were dropped behind the Iranian forces, which would have been the first use of airborne troops since the start of the war. The Iraqi ground assault began at 3:30 AM, when an assault force using amphibious armored vehicles and boats landed on the island. Afterwards, they immediately set up pontoon bridges and crossed large amounts of forces onto the island. The Iranians had little time to react as they were hit by the military "sledgehammer". The Iraqis used 2,000 tanks against 60 Iranian ones.

While Iraqi Republican Guards forces cleared the two islands the Iraqi Third Corps protected their Eastern flank and severed Iranian ties to the mainland, with the help of hovercraft equipped commandos. The battle resulted in over 2,115 prisoners, with the Iranian forces being overwhelmed in 8 hours of combat. Saddam appeared live on Iraqi state television to "lead" the charge against the Iranians. The vast majority of the Iranian defenders were killed during the quick assault, with relatively few taken prisoner.

=== Renewed offensives into Iran: the Battle of Qasr Shirin and the Battle of Dehloran ===
The final two Tawakal Ala Allah operations took place in Amarah in the direction of Dehloran and Khanaqin in the direction of Qasre Shirin. On July 12, Iraqi forces shelled the Iranian positions around the Zubaidat area near the border, a group of oil fields east of Amarah. These were some of the last occupied positions on Iraqi territory, and the shelling was soon followed by a new Iraqi attack with a force of about five divisions. At 7:30 AM, Republican Guards forces, and forces from Iraq's 4th Corps, advanced on the Iranian positions. It is unclear whether Iraq used gas, but the Iranian defenses quickly collapsed. Within a matter of hours, Iraq was in control of virtually all of the Iranian positions on its territory, and took roughly 2,500 Iranian prisoners.

By 12 July at the central front, the Iraqis had driven away from Amarah, and moved into Iran on a broad offensive, swept aside scattered Iranian resistance, and captured the city of Dehloran and Qasre Shirin, 30 kilometres (19 mi) and 20 kilometres (12 mi) respectively inside Iran, and captured another 2,500 Iranian troops along with substantial amount of armour and materiel, which took days to transport to Iraq. In addition the Iraqis captured the Iranian small towns of Sumar, Naft Shahr, Sarpol Zahab, Saleh Abad, Mousiyan, Patak, as well as dozens of other villages along the central and southern portions of the border, along with occupying and cutting off the strategically important Ahvaz-Khorramshahr highway and in places reaching and occupying important crossing-points on the Karkheh river. The intention was to push Khomeini to accept UN security council resolution 598. Had Iran not accepted the ceasefire and had Iraq willed it, Iraq could have continued to occupy this Iranian territory. However, soon after Khomeini's acceptance of the UN ceasefire deal on 20 July 1988, the Iraqis withdrew from the towns, claiming that they had no desire to conquer Iranian territory. Iraq had proved that Iran could no longer occupy Iraqi territory, and showed the rejuvenated power of Iraq's Army after being resupplied by the USSR the previous two years.

== Aftermath ==
These speedy Iraqi attacks took the Iranians by surprise and sent them into a state of confusion; they found themselves surrounded by Iraqi troops on all sides and lost all control over their forces. Thus this large-scale operation ended with the liberation of all occupied Iraqi territories. The Iranian troops in the various sectors involved in the operation had received a fatal blow; their various headquarters and formations had virtually ceased to exist. During the 1988 battles, the Iranians put up little resistance to the Iraqi offensives, having been worn out by nearly eight years of war. They lost large amounts of equipment; and 20,000 Iranian troops had been taken prisoner of war throughout the course of the operations. It was the operation that effectively ended the war, and it represented a clear Iraqi victory over the Iranian forces. The Iraqis carried out their missions quickly, efficiently, and with full coordination. In the fall of 1988, the Iraqis displayed in Baghdad captured Iranian weapons amounting to more than three-quarters (75%) of the Iranian armor inventory and almost half of its artillery pieces and armored personnel carriers. On 2 July, Iran belatedly set up a joint central command which unified the Revolutionary Guard, Army, and Kurdish rebels, and dispel the rivalry between the Army and the Revolutionary Guard. However this came too late, and Iran was believed to have fewer than 200 remaining tanks on the southern front, faced against thousands of Iraqi tanks. In addition, the US launched Operation Praying Mantis (which devastated Iran's navy on the same day as the 2nd Battle of Al Faw), and the accidental US shooting down of Iran Air Flight 655 helped to convince Iran's leadership of their isolation and their inability to succeed in the war.

The battles simultaneously highlighted the maturity of the Iraqi army, which had evolved throughout the war to the point where, during the Tawakal ala Allah Operations, it could carry out combined-arms operations utilising the different branches of the Iraqi Armed Forces as a single cohesive force.

Iraqi chemical weapons contributed decisively to their victories.

With the Iranian Army in retreat, various elements of the Iranian leadership, led by Ali Akbar Hashemi Rafsanjani (who had initially pushed for the extension of the war), persuaded Khomeini to sue for peace due to Iran's almost non-existent morale and impending bankruptcy. On 20 July 1988, Iran accepted Resolution 598, showing its willingness to accept a ceasefire, and on 20 August 1988, peace was officially restored. After a series of battles, in which Iraq had emerged as the victor, the leadership in Baghdad stated that they did not desire to conquer Iranian territory. The success of the Iraqi armed forces had convinced the clerics of Iran that they could not attain their objectives on the field of battle and to accept the ceasefire.
