= Grand Faw Port =

Port under construction in southern Iraq

- Interactive map of Grand Faw Port
- Location within Iraq

Location
- Location: Faw, Basra, Iraq
- Coordinates: 29.9148°N 48.4411°E
- UN/LOCODE: IRQ FAW

Details
- Built: Phase I: (2013-2019) 11 meters (36 feet) max draft (hull) of channels Phase II: (2020–2025) 19.8 m (64,9 ft) max draft of channels Phase III: (2030–2045) TBD max draft of channels
- Operated by: (Iraq) State Company for Maritime Transport (Iraq) State Company for Iraqi Ports
- Type of Harbor: Bulk cargo; container terminal; ro–ro; oil terminal
- Size: 54 km^{2} Free Trade Area
- No. of berths: Phase I: 5 (Completed); Phase II: 30 (by 2030); Phase III: 100 (by 2045)
- Rail lines: Development Road
- Rail gauge: 1,435 mm (4 ft 8 1/2 in) standard gauge
- Truck types: Tractor unit Tank Truck

The Grand Faw Port (Arabic: ميناء الفاو الكبير, romanized: Mīnāʼ al-Fāw al-kabīr) is a port under construction located on the coast of Iraq, in proximity of the city of Al-Faw, on the northern tip of the Gulf of Basra.

It is meant to be the southern terminal of the Development Road and is considered a strategic national project for Iraq. It is planned to become one of the largest ports in the world and the largest in the Middle East. In addition, it is hoped to strengthen Iraq's geopolitical position in the region and the world.

== History ==
The port is located in the Faw peninsula, south of Basra. The history of this project dates back to after the Second World War, then was re-presented in the seventies, and the first serious and operational implementation steps began in the eighties, but after the outbreak of the Iran-Iraq war, the project was halted. After the military invasion of Iraq led by United States and allies, and the fall of the previous regime, major international investment companies headed to Iraq to re-propose the implementation of the project. A proposal was made by a major investment company and the construction phase was supposed to be completed, and the operation to be started by 2038. But the Ministry of Transport turned it down and made major design changes. The ministry's changes aimed to expand the project size from 12 to 54 square km, establish about 100 berths for unloading and loading different types of goods, construct power plants, water desalination plants, construct a container area more than one square km in size, and a multi-purpose yard with an area of 600 square km. As well as the construction of refineries for oil derivatives, a petrochemical plant, and expanding the railway stations connecting Basra with the other governorates in Iraq, and the construction of new one to connect Faw Peninsula with Basra. Furthermore, Iraq is planning to establish large naval base in the Faw peninsula.

According to experts, the delay of the project is related to financial, technical, and internal and external political problems, which greatly delayed the completion of the first phase of the project.

== Overview ==
The project was first official proposed and announced in 2010, however countless delays due to the conflict in Iraq, and the blockade by cash shortages due to internal hostilities and low oil prices caused the project to be halted. However finally, in 2020 the Prime Minister of Iraq Mustafa al-Kadhimi launched the second phase of the port, with South Korean company Daewoo Engineering winning the $2.7 billion contracts for the port in December. Several other companies competed for the contracts including Chinese, Emirati and American companies.

Iraq hopes the port will create a shorter transportation corridor between the Middle East and Europe, bypassing the Suez Canal, through the eventual expansion of a national rail network.

=== Construction ===
The breakwaters of the port have already been completed costing over 1 billion dollars, they became the world's longest at 14.523 km. The breakwaters were constructed by Daewoo Engineering & Construction Co. Ltd (South Korea), GCPI (Iraq) and TECHNITAL (Italy) in Basra, Iraq on 2 April 2020 as recognized by the Guinness World Records.

Construction of the initial five berths, as well as roads, and a tunnel to connect it to Um-Qasr port across the Khor-Al-Zubair waterway began.

In April 2024, during a visit to Baghdad by Turkish President Recep Tayyip Erdogan, a quadrilateral memorandum of understanding regarding cooperation in the Iraq Development Road project was signed between Iraq, Türkiye, Qatar, and the UAE, inked by the transportation ministers from each country. The 1,200-kilometer project with railway and highways which will connect the Great Faw Port, aimed to be the largest port in the Middle East. It is planned to be completed by 2025 to the Turkish border at an expected cost of $17 billion.

On 7 November 2024, a handover ceremony was held at the site of the Grand Faw Port, where the Prime Minister Mohammed Shia' Al Sudani announced the completion of the construction of the five initial berths, concluding the first phase of the construction of the planned 100 berths.

== See also ==
- List of ports in Iraq
