= Development Fund (Iraq) =

Iraqi finance institution

Iraq Development Fund
- Native name: صندوق العراق للتنمية
- Industry: Development finance institution
- Founded: 7 August 2023; 3 years ago
- Headquarters: Baghdad, Iraq
- Key people: Chairman: Prime Minister Ali al-Zaidi; CEO: Mohammed Al-Najjar
- Website: ifd.gov.iq

The Iraq Development Fund (Arabic: صندوق العراق للتنمية, lit. 'Iraq Fund for Development'), is a development finance institution established in 2023. The fund is chaired by the Prime Minister of Iraq, and its purpose is to create an optimal investment environment as well as develop and diversify the country's non-oil economic resources. With a heavy emphasis on strengthening the private sector, the fund finances projects of significant social and environmental value. As an institution associated with the Council of Ministers, it receives its funding from the annual central government budget.

The Fund was established on 7 August 2023 by Mohammed Shia al-Sudani.

== Overview ==
Iraq's economy is dominated by the oil sector, constituting 85% of the annual budget. The economy's heavy reliance on oil production exposes the country to the volatility of the global oil market; namely macroeconomic shocks that cause the drop of oil prices. In 2020, the global COVID-19 pandemic's effect on oil prices devastated the country's economy, causing a significant budget crisis. In addition to Iraq's oil dependence, the country is one of the most vulnerable to the adverse effects of climate change. In December 2022, the World Bank published a report highlighting the dangerous repercussions if Iraq does not take swift action to mitigate effects of climate change, particularly in areas such as water scarcity. The report also emphasises the need for a transition away from oil dependence in energy production toward green energy. In light of this, there had been calls to establish a fund for the purpose of increasing economic diversification, green-transition and private sector development at least since 2017. The Iraq Development Fund was established in August 2023, and as of February 2025, the fund has garnered more than $7bn in foreign direct investments and signed Memoranda of Understanding with companies and institutions of several countries, including Turkey, Saudi Arabia, United Kingdom and Japan.

== History ==
In December 2022, during a meeting with the Chair of Iraqi Private Banks League and CEOs of Iraqi private banks, Premier Mohammed Shia al-Sudani proposed establishing the Iraq Development Fund.

On 7 August 2023, following the issuance of an executive order from the prime minister, the Iraqi Ministry of Justice published the Iraq Development Fund Regulation (No. 3/2023) in the official gazette, establishing the fund. On 24 October 2023, the fund's management chaired by al-Sudani, held its inaugural meeting. Several topics were discussed, such as the selection of the fund's executive director. A review of the fund's action plan was also conducted.

On 24 April 2024, the Iraq Development Fund signed a number of Memoranda of Understanding with 12 Saudi companies.

On 15 January 2025, during Prime Minister al-Sudani's visit to the United Kingdom, a Partnership & Cooperation Agreement (PCA) was signed between the two countries. UK Prime minister Keir Starmer also promised that the United Kingdom will "leverage its global financial expertise to aid in the establishment of the [Iraq Development Fund]".

In February 2025, CEO Al-Najjar announced that the fund had successfully attracted $7bn in foreign direct investments.

On 15 April 2025, Turkey Wealth Fund and Iraq Development Fund signed a Memorandum of Understanding to facilitate investments in energy, ICT, infrastructure, logistics, automotive, agriculture and fintech. In addition, the MoU included a framework for collaboration in knowledge sharing, technology transfer and resource management.

On 2 June 2025, a Memorandum of Understanding was signed with British Agrium Capital worth $200 million. The MoU included establishing Iraq's first infant formula production facility. With locally sourced ingredients, the plant is expected to fill 85% of Iraq's domestic market demand for the product, reducing Iraq's reliance on imports as well as allowing for local quality assurance. At the same time, a Memorandum of Understanding was signed with Japan Cooperation Center for the Middle East (JCCME) to provide the fund with logistical support. It included establishing a regional office for the Iraq Development Fund in Japan.

On 7 October 2025, three MoUs in water management and irrigation development were signed with France, two with the United Kingdom and United States, and one with Japan.

== See also ==
- Economy of Iraq
- Iraq–Europe Development Road
