= Iraqi Popular Army =

Iraqi paramilitary unit under the Ba'athist regime

- Active: 1970–1991
- Disbanded: April 29, 1991
- Country: Ba'athist Iraq
- Type: Paramilitary; Gendarmerie; Reserve army Auxiliary force
- Role: Gendarmerie; First Line of Defence (1980–88); Reserve army Internal security Light infantry
- Size: Peaked at over 650,000 in 1987
- Part of: Iraqi Ba'ath Party
- Garrison/HQ: Baqubah; Basra; Tikrit
- Nicknames: Jaish al-Sha'abi (People's Army)
- Patron: Saddam Hussein; Izzat Ibrahim al-Douri
- Equipment: Small arms, infantry fighting vehicles, light artillery, MANPADS
- Engagements: Second Iraqi-Kurdish War; Lebanese Civil War; Iran–Iraq War; Battle of Khorramshahr; Operation Tariq al-Quds; Operation Jerusalem; First Battle of Al Faw; 1991 uprisings in Iraq

Commanders
- Last commander: Taha Yassin Ramadan

Insignia
- Ba'ath party flag

The Iraqi Popular Army, also known as the People's Army or People's Militia (Arabic: الشعبي الجيش, romanized: Al Jaysh ash Shaabi), was a paramilitary and gendarmerie organization composed of civilian volunteers to protect the Ba'athist regime against internal opposition and serve as a counterbalance against any coup attempt by the regular Iraqi Army.

In 1987, the People's Army, standing at an estimated 650,000, approached the regular armed forces' manpower strength.

== History ==
Officially, it was the Iraqi Baath Party Militia and included a special youth section. Formed in 1970, the Popular Army grew rapidly, and by 1977 it was estimated to have 50,000 active members. Subsequently, a phenomenal growth, giving the paramilitary extensive internal security and gendarmerie functions, occurred. Whereas its original purpose was to give the Baath Party an active role in every town and village, the Popular Army in 1981 began its most ambitious task to date, the support of the regular armed forces.

The official functions of the Popular Army were to act as an auxiliary force to support the regular armed forces in times of war and to safeguard revolutionary achievements, to promote mass consciousness, to consolidate national unity, and to bolster the relationship between the people and the army in times of peace. Foreign observers concluded, however, that the primary function of the Popular Army was political in nature; first, to enlist popular support for the Baath Party, and second, to act as a counterweight against any coup attempts by the regular armed forces.

Beginning in 1974, Taha Yassin Ramadan, a close associate of President Saddam Hussein, commanded the Popular Army, which was responsible for internal security. The command of such a large military establishment gave Ramadan so much power, however, that some foreign observers speculated that the primary function of his second in command was to keep him from using the paramilitary force as a personal power base.

Popular Army members were recruited from among both women and men (who had completed their regular army service) eighteen years of age and older. It was unclear whether or not Baath Party membership was a prerequisite—especially after 1981 when the numerical strength of the Popular Army ballooned—but, clearly, party indoctrination was at least as important as military training. Members usually underwent a two-month annual training period, and they were paid from party funds. Although the extent of their training was unknown in early 1988, all recruits were specialized in light infantry. Graduates had a gendarmerie role where they were responsible for guarding government buildings and installations, and were concentrated around policing sensitive centers in major towns. Paramilitary members possessed some sophisticated arms, and it was possible that disgruntled officers contemplating a challenge to Saddam Hussein could rally the support of a force of such paramilitaries.

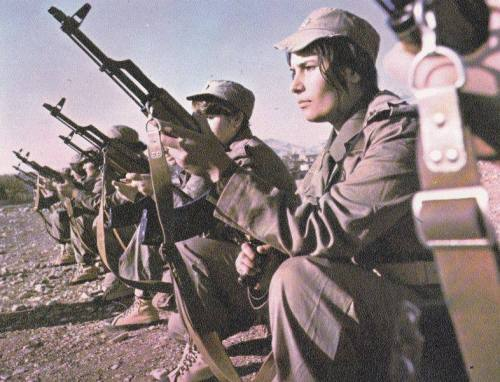
Militants of the Popular Army in 1980s

The Popular Army was sent into Iraqi Kurdistan and first saw action in the Second Iraqi-Kurdish War. They were also sent out of the country as an expeditionary force to Lebanon to support and fight alongside Palestinian guerrillas during the Lebanese Civil War.

It was only dissolved when Taha Yassin Ramadan became Vice President of Iraq in 1991.

=== Action seen in the Iran-Iraq War ===
==== Al-Faw ====
The First Battle of Al-Faw, fought on February 11, 1986, was a battle of the Iran–Iraq War. The Iranians launched a surprise attack against the Iraqi troops defending the al-Faw Peninsula. The Iraqi units in charge of the defenses were mostly made up of poorly trained Iraqi Popular Army conscripts, which collapsed when they were suddenly attacked by the Iranian Pasdaran (Revolutionary Guard) forces. The collapse at Al-Faw was widely cited as emblematic of the broader structural weaknesses of the Popular Army throughout the Iran-Iraq War. Because its members received only a two-month annual training period and were recruited primarily on the basis of party loyalty rather than military aptitude, the force consistently performed poorly in conventional combat against motivated Iranian infantry. Western military analysts noted that Iraqi commanders generally kept Popular Army units away from the most intense frontline combat after the early years of the war, relegating them increasingly to rear-area security, garrison duties, and the defence of fixed installations, while the regular Iraqi Army and later the Republican Guard bore the main combat burden.

== See also ==
- Iraqi Army
- Fedayeen Saddam
- National Defense Battalions
