= Maher Abdul Rashid =

Iraqi general

Colonel General Maher Abdul-Rashid
- ماهر عبد الرشيد
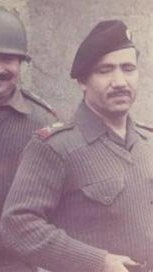
- Rashid in 1982 during the Iran–Iraq War.
- Born: 24 July 1942; Tikrit, Kingdom of Iraq
- Died: 29 June 2014 (aged 71); Sulaymaniyah, Iraq
- Children: Ali (son); Abdullah (son); Sahar (daughter)
- Relatives: Maj. Gen. Taher Abdul Rashid (brother); Marwan (nephew); Qusay Hussein (son-in-law)
- Military career
- Allegiance: Ba'athist Iraq
- Branch: Iraqi Ground Forces
- Service years: 1963–2003
- Rank: Colonel general
- Commands: 3rd Army
- Conflicts: Six Day War (seconded to Jordan); Yom Kippur War; Iran–Iraq War; Operation Ramadan; Operation Ghader; First Battle of al-Faw; Operation Karbala-5; Tawakalna ala Allah Operations; Second Battle of al-Faw; Gulf War; 1991 uprisings in Iraq; 2003 Invasion of Iraq

Colonel General Maher Abdul Rashid (Arabic: ماهر عبد الرشيد) (24 July 1942 – 29 June 2014) was an Iraqi military officer. Rashid rose to prominence during the Iran–Iraq War, and was regarded as one of Saddam's best generals, serving as Chief-of-Staff of the Iraqis after being brought out of retirement, which he had been forced into in 1983. Rashid also played a prominent role in helping Iraq to regain her initiative during the war.

== Iran–Iraq War ==
High Iraqi losses during the conflict nearly led to a mutiny led by Rashid, father-in-law of Hussein's second son. Rashid began by public criticizing Saddam Hussein, and claimed that many of Iraq's casualties were caused by Saddam's meddling into military affairs. Saddam ordered him back to Baghdad due to both his public criticism and his failure to remove the Iranians from the al-Faw peninsula. Aware that an order to return to Baghdad was probably a death sentence for Rashid, his officers warned Saddam that if anything were to happen to Rashid they would mutiny. This confrontation with the military led to the greater independence of military planning from Ba'athist-leadership interference. Shortly afterwards, the Iraqi Air Force once again established air superiority.

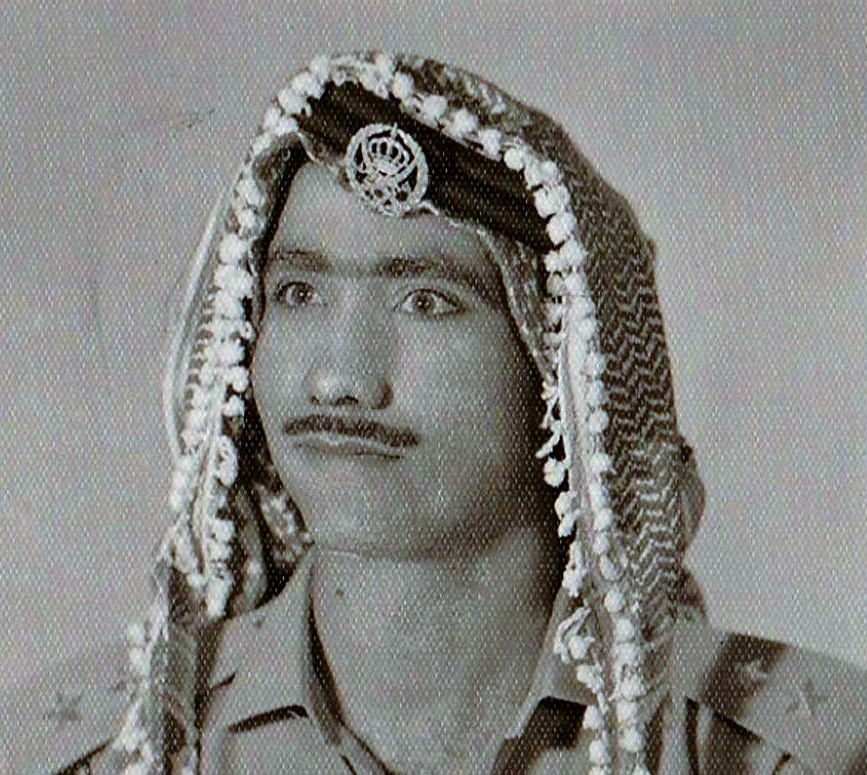
General Rashid as a First Lieutenant seconded to the Jordanian Arab Army during the Six-Day War.

Despite this, Rashid was placed under house arrest following the end of the Iran–Iraq War in an effort to reduce the power of Generals who had become influential during the war years in order to prevent any possible coup attempts from forming.

== 1991 uprisings ==
Following the Gulf War Iraq experienced a wave of uprisings and Saddam called on Rashid to help put down the uprising against the Ba'athist government.

== Iraq War and aftermath ==
Rashid was given command by Saddam over the Iraqi Armed Forces's Southern Command in the run up to the 2003 Invasion of Iraq. Saddam also appointed him as the General Supervisor for the Iraqi Army's 3rd, 4th, and 7th Corps. After the fall of the Iraqi government Rashid disappeared, before being arrested in July 2003 in Tikrit. He spent the next five years in prison.

Following Rashid's release in 2008, he returned to Tikrit, and lived in his farm near Tikrit.

== Personal life ==
Rashid was a Sunni Muslim from Tikrit, and was both a close friend of Saddam Hussein and also a member of the same tribe; the Al-Bu Nasir tribe. In 1985 his daughter, Sahar, married Saddam Hussein's son Qusay. Rashid had promised to liberate the al-Fao peninsula in the Iran–Iraq War and had offered his daughter to Saddam's son Qusay to show his certainty. They had three children but later divorced.

Maher's younger brother, Taher, who incidentally was also an accomplished and decorated officer in the Iraqi Army who reached the rank of Major General who was killed in action in 1988 during Tawakalna ala Allah IV due to a plane crash.

== Death ==
Rashid died on 29 June 2014 in hospital in the city of Sulaymaniyah in Iraq, two months after having suffered a stroke. Rashid had also been suffering from a long-standing illness. He was survived by his family, including his two grandsons, Yahya Qusay Saddam al-Tikriti and Yaqub Qusay Saddam al-Tikriti; who were also the surviving children of Qusay Hussein.
