= Jerusalem Army =

- جيش القدس
- Active: 17 February 2001 – 23 May 2003
- Allegiance: Iraq
- Type: Paramilitary

Commanders
- Last commander: Iyad Futayyih

Jerusalem Army, also known as Al Quds Army, (Arabic: جيش القدس), was a paramilitary volunteer force created on 17 February 2001 by the Iraqi government to assist the Palestinians to liberate Palestine and Jerusalem from Israel. The idea came following the eruption of the Palestinian uprising on 28 September 2000. Both men and women could join the Jerusalem Army. Experts said it was intended to be a mass volunteer force, with female as well as male units. It was dissolved pursuant to CPA Order 2, amongst other paramilitary organizations.
