= Al-Faw =

Port town in Al-Basrah, Iraq

Al-Faw ٱلْفَاو Fao
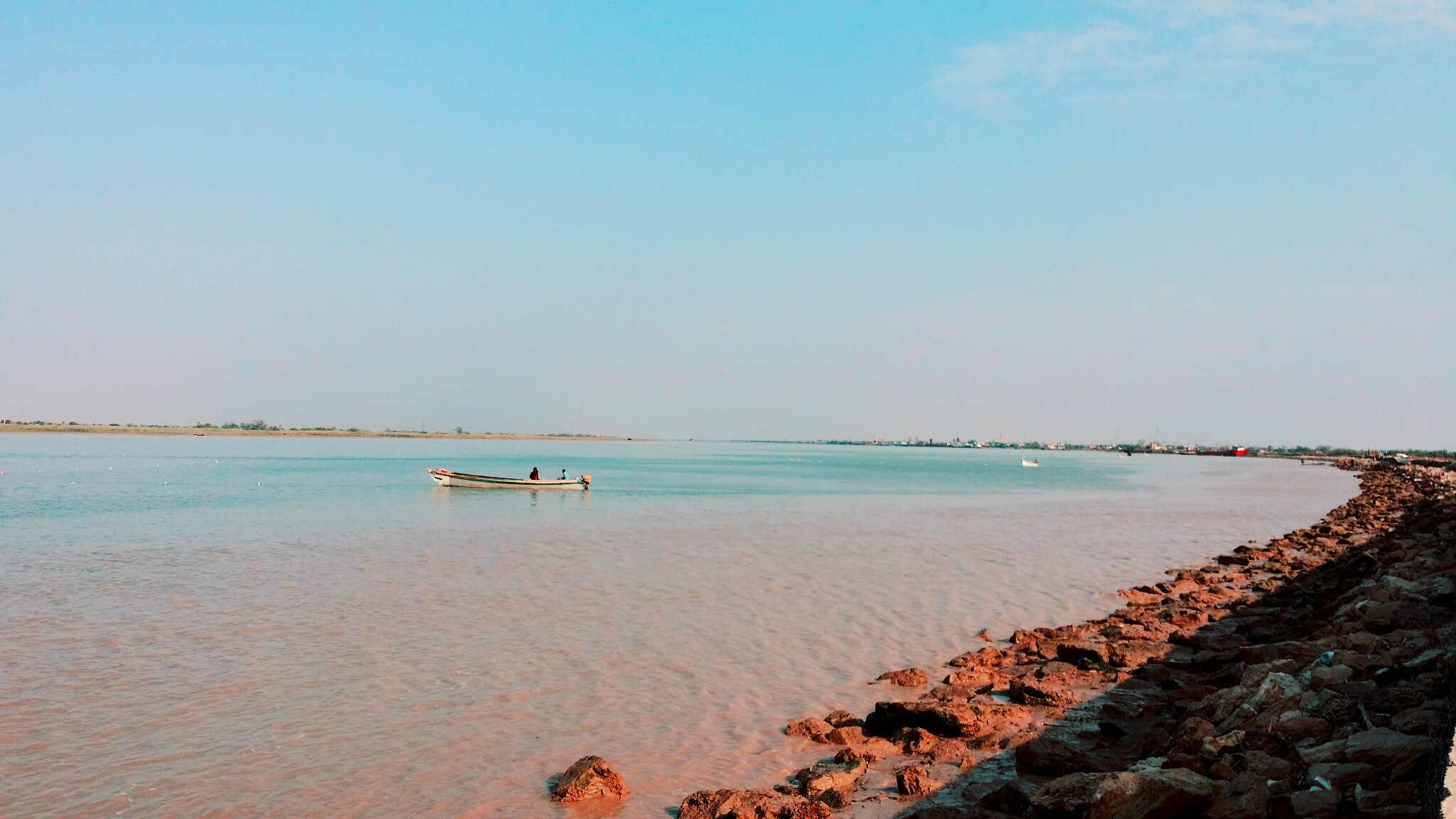
- The Shatt al-Arab

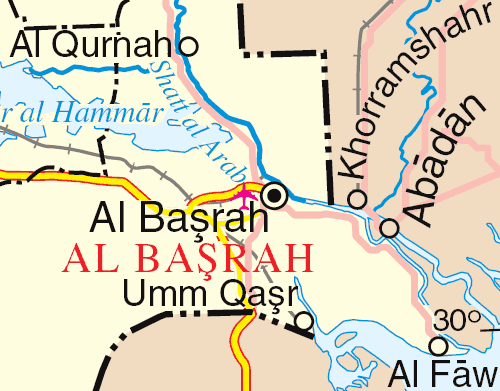
- South-East Iraq with Al-Faw in the lower right corner of the map

- Location within Iraq Location within Persian Gulf
- Coordinates: 29°58′33″N 48°28′20″E
- Country: Iraq
- Governorate: Al-Basrah
- District: Al-Faw District

Population (2018)
  - City: 42,252
  - Urban: 35,836
- Time zone: UTC+3 (GMT +3)
  - Summer (DST): UTC+4
- Postal code: 61011

Al-Fāw (Arabic: ٱلْفَاو; sometimes transliterated as Fao) is a port town on Al-Faw Peninsula in Iraq near the Shatt al-Arab and the Persian Gulf. The Al Faw Peninsula is part of the Basra Governorate. Al-Faw is located about 100 kilometers from the provincial capital, Basra, and has a population of approximately 52,000 people.

Until 1960, Al-Faw was part of Abu al-Khasib District, before being established as an independent district on August 30, 1960. The city is known for its marine products such as fish, shrimp, and salt, as well as for cultivating henna and date palms, the latter of which declined significantly due to the military and economic conflicts that lasted for 23 years under the rule of former Iraqi president Saddam Hussein. The people of Al-Faw, like other residents of Basra, speak an Iraqi Arabic dialect similar to that of Kuwait, where the letter jīm (ج) is often pronounced as yā (ي), for example, the word rajul (man) is pronounced rayyāl.

The city’s climate is characterized by hot, dry summers and cool, humid winters. Its location at the head of the Gulf gives it significant economic importance in Iraq, both agriculturally and commercially, as it serves as a port for oil exports. Most of the city’s inhabitants depend on fishing for their livelihood.

== Etymology ==
There are various opinions regarding the origin of the name Al-Faw (الفاو). According to a local narrative passed down by residents, a ship named Al-Faw (الفاو) belonging to the Daylamis came to the area to purchase dates. A strong wind caused the ship to sink in the Nahr al-Lubban (نهر اللبان), which was formerly known as Nahr al-Muhallabān (نهر المهلبان) named after the famous Arab commander Al-Muhallab ibn Abi Ṣufra, and the name gradually changed over time to al-Lubban. People began referring to the area as maḥall gharaq al-Faw (the place where the Faw sank). Eventually, the word gharaq (sinking) was dropped, and the area became known simply as Al-Faw.

Another view suggests that the name is derived from the city’s position at the mouth (fāh) of the Shatt al-Arab, which evolved linguistically into Faw. Some sources, however, argue that the original word was al-Faʾu (الفأو), meaning “open land visible to the eye” or “land enclosed between two elevations”.

Other sources question these theories, noting that the name Al-Faw only became widespread after the construction of the telegraph station in 1861. According to this explanation, the British referred to the area with the English abbreviation “FEW”, composed of the letters F for Flat, E for Earth, and W for Water. The term FEW, meaning “flat land on the water,” was then adapted to Faw, later written as Fao in English sources.

== History ==
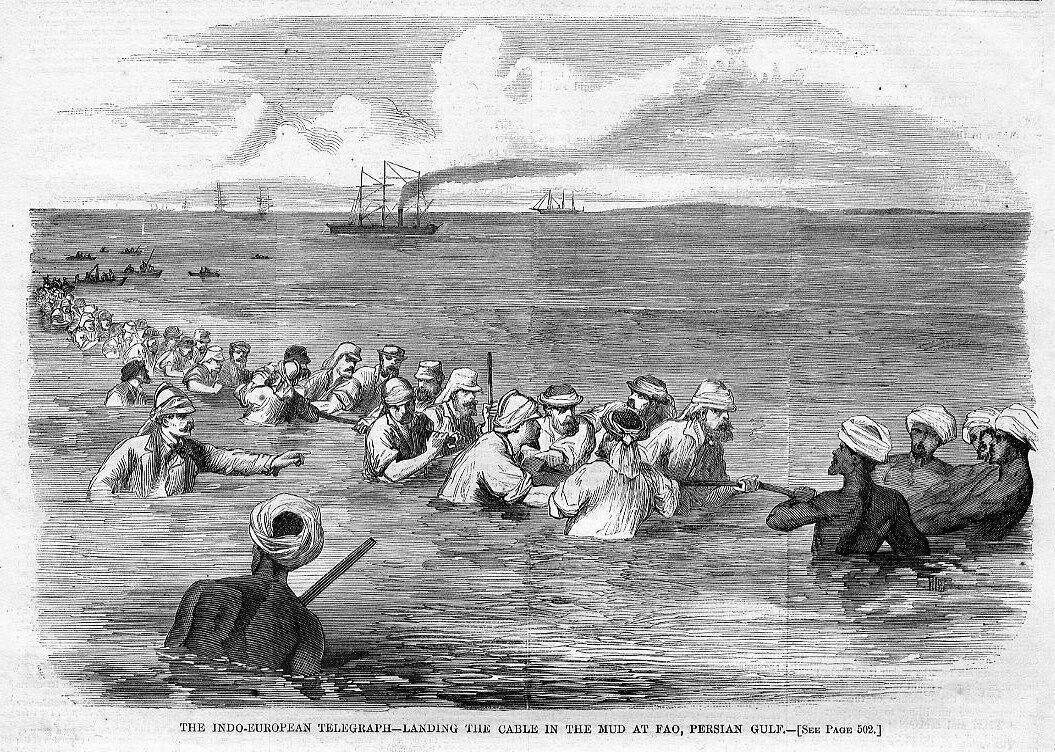
Landing the Persian Gulf Telegraphic Cable in the mud at Fao, in 1865

Some sources indicate that the history of Al-Faw dates back to around 2500 BCE. Archaeological findings suggest that the Assyrian king Sennacherib referred to the area as Rību Salāmu, meaning “Gate of Safety.” The Arabs, on the other hand, are said to have called it Māʾ al-Ṣabr (“bitter water”). However, these accounts remain a matter of debate, especially considering that the area was likely submerged under the waters of the Persian Gulf during those ancient times.

=== Ottoman period ===
The Ottoman governor Midhat Pasha described Al-Faw as the “Key to Iraq”, while Salah al-Din al-Ṣabbagh referred to it as the “Land of Safety”. At that time, Al-Faw was part of the al-Maʿāmir lands, which were used as grazing areas known locally as al-dakāk, and were leased (multazama) by the al-Saʿdūn family in exchange for their loyalty to the Ottoman state.

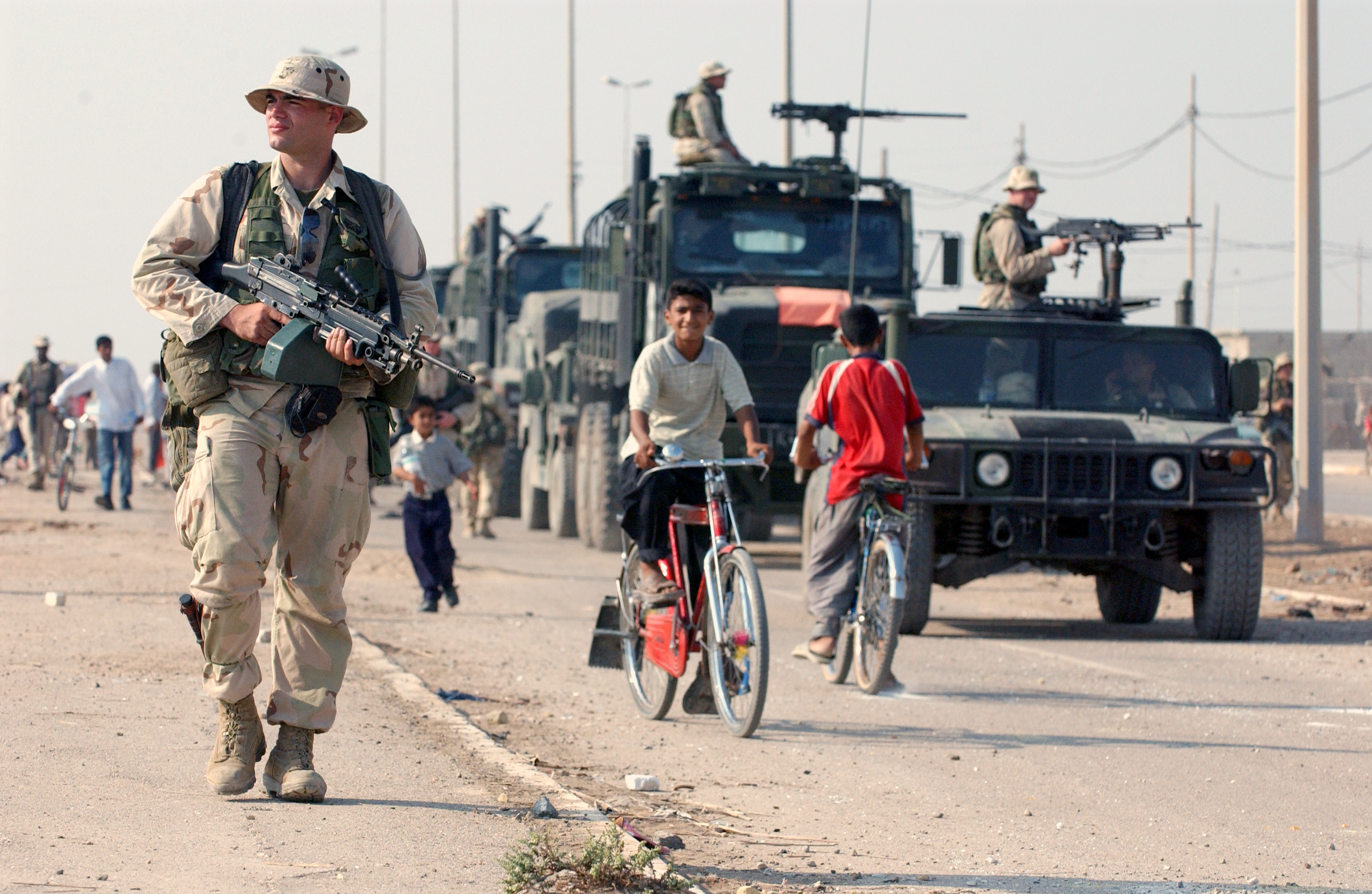
U.S. Marines patrolling the streets of Al-Faw in October 2003

Since the lands of Al-Faw were uncultivated, they were classified under the Ottoman land system as state-owned property (Bayt al-Māl). The Ottoman governor of Basra had the authority to grant such lands for investment under the iltizām (tax farming) system. Under this arrangement, the governor granted the lands of al-Maʿāmir to Rāshid al-Saʿdūn, making the southern areas of al-Maʿāmir subject to his concession. When these lands were later transferred from the al-Saʿdūn family to the al-Ṣabāḥ family, they became directly leased by the Ṣabāḥs under Ottoman supervision.

During the second half of the 19th century, British trade in the Persian Gulf and Iran expanded considerably, increasing Britain’s strategic interests in the region. Because Iraq provided the shortest and safest route between British India and Britain, the British sought to strengthen their influence in Al-Faw, viewing it as a strategic location to protect the Shatt al-Arab from foreign control and to closely monitor Ottoman movements in the area.

The British made significant political and economic efforts to turn Al-Faw into a zone of influence, as its location at the head of a major waterway was crucial for Britain’s imperial trade routes. The Shatt al-Arab represented a key link in the shortest route between Britain and its colonies in India. The British sought to monitor Ottoman activity and prevent any attempt to strengthen Ottoman control over Al-Faw.

In response, the Ottoman Empire attempted to consolidate its presence in Al-Faw by constructing a military fortress, intended to monitor British ships visiting regional ports and to defend Ottoman interests against growing British influence. Britain, however, viewed this as a direct threat to its influence and lodged a formal protest with the Sublime Porte. The British also urged Tsarist Russia, as a mediator of the Treaty of Erzurum, and Iran to object to the construction of fortifications along the Shatt al-Arab. Diplomatic correspondence over the issue continued until the end of the 19th century.

The Ottoman authorities further strengthened their control by establishing a government office and a quarantine station in Al-Faw to monitor incoming ships and collect customs duties. Britain opposed these measures, submitting repeated protests. When diplomatic notes failed to produce results, the British attempted to open a branch consulate in Al-Faw to stay close to Ottoman activities. After the Ottomans rejected the request, Britain stationed a warship off the coast of Al-Faw both to monitor the situation and to signal its power to the Ottoman authorities.

The city was extensively damaged during the Iraq-Iran war, but in 1989 it was rebuilt in four months to a completely new city plan.

=== British period ===
Control over Al-Faw was contested among the Portuguese, Ottomans, and British, the latter of whom occupied the area in 1914. The city became the site of the first battle between Iraqi tribal forces and the British occupation army in 1914, in the Kūt al-Zayn area. The battle was led by Sheikh Shalal ibn Faḍl, the chief of the al-Sharsh tribes, and inflicted heavy losses on the invading forces. Al-Faw was the first point of British landing during their invasion of Iraq in 1914.

=== Republican period ===
During the Iran–Iraq War, the Al-Faw Peninsula was a contested battleground between the two countries. It was occupied in February 1986 by Iran and was recaptured by Iraq in April 1988 in a fierce battle that resulted in 170,000 casualties from both sides. United Nations investigations indicate that Iraq used chemical weapons during the battle. The city was completely destroyed and a new city was built within 4 months in 1989. However, most of the residents who had fled the city did not return.

At the end of the war, the former Iraqi President Saddam Hussein built a lavish palace located 5 kilometers from Baghdad International Airport, named the Al-Faw Palace in commemoration of its liberation. It was built in the middle of a lake, hence it is also called the Water Palace. After the 2003 invasion of Iraq, the palace was used as a base by U.S. forces, and in 2004 it became the headquarters for the Multi-National Force – Iraq.

During the 2003 invasion itself, Al-Faw Peninsula fell into the hands of the attacking international coalition forces after just a few days, following a lopsided battle that resulted in the deaths of 140 Iraqi soldiers and the capture of approximately 440 others.

== Population ==
The Al-Faw area is inhabited by Arab tribes, including the Rashid, the Dawasir, the Banu Tamim, the Al Nassar, the Shilsh, the Hayyal, and others.

At the beginning of the 20th century, the population of Al-Faw was about 1,700. Foreigners constituted the majority of the population until 1913, when the population reached approximately 5,000. The total population reached about 25,715 in 1948 and 75,000 in 1979. The population of the district was about 105,080 in 2005, while the population of the city itself was 18,890 in 2007, according to estimates by the Iraqi Central Statistical Organization. According to 2022 estimates, the population of Al-Faw was 39,714.

Districts of Al-Faw
District	Population (2022)
Al-Karrar	5,562
Al-Rasool	4,744
Al-Sadr	4,456
Al-Salam	4,139
Al-Hizam Al-Akhdar	3,978
Al-Hussein	3,403
Al-Sadiq	3,351
Al-Zahra	3,312
Al-Madina	2,452
Al-Tamimiya	2,426
Arradi Al-Sabakh	1,198
Al-Markaz	693

== Geography ==
=== Topography ===
The alluvial plain is formed from the immense sediment deposits carried by the Shatt al-Arab into the Persian Gulf. Its elevation is 12 meters above sea level, compared to 40 meters for Baghdad in the center and 120 meters for Mosul in the north. Over time, these sediments have begun to form new, fertile land suitable for agriculture, causing the area of the Al-Faw Peninsula to continuously increase.

Stretching from the Abu Al-Khasib area in the north to Ras Al-Baysha in the south, a green belt of palm groves lines the west of the Shatt al-Arab, its width not exceeding one kilometer. This belt is intersected by waterways of varying widths, connected to the Shatt al-Arab, which are called ahwasat (creeks); these are affected by the tides. Along the western edge of the groves runs the main highway connecting the city to Basra.

The land between this main highway and the strategic road (الطريق الإستراتيجي) is soft and prone to flooding in winter due to a high water table. The land west of the strategic road, extending towards Khor Al-Zubair, is submerged under shallow waters. The salt flats area consists of basins used for salt sedimentation.

South of the Umm Qasr–Al-Faw road lies Iraq's only maritime outlet: the Khor Abdullah, which connects to the Persian Gulf.

=== Climate ===
Most rainfall occurs in the winter and spring seasons, from November to April. The total annual rainfall for the period between 1980 and 2006 ranged from 84.3 mm to 296.6 mm, with an average of 134.8 mm. The total annual evaporation for the same period ranged from 3292.1 mm to 4506.9 mm, with an average of 3735.7 mm. The ratio of the average annual evaporation to the average annual rainfall was 27.7.

The city's location at the head of the Persian Gulf places it within the subtropical zone, dominated by a subtropical high-pressure system. Consequently, during the winter, spring, and autumn, the area experiences subsiding air due to the dominance of this high-pressure system, which inhibits the passage of some dynamic low-pressure systems, especially in winter and spring. Furthermore, there is a surplus of solar radiation in the area due to this subtropical location, particularly in summer when the skies are clear, the duration of daily sunshine is long, and the incoming solar rays are nearly direct.

=== Water Resources ===
Numerous factors affect the components of the main water in the Shatt al-Arab within the Al-Faw District. The most important of these is the influence of salty seawater, where large quantities of saline water from the Persian Gulf are pushed during high tide for long distances into the Shatt al-Arab, reaching as far north as the Al-Saiba sub-district in Abu Al-Khasib for several days each month. This is due to the low discharge of the Shatt al-Arab, which has led to an increase in its salinity. This coincides with the scarcity of discharge from the Tigris and Euphrates rivers and changes in the discharge of the Karun River, causing seawater to encroach into the Shatt al-Arab and consequently degrading its water quality.

The groundwater in Al-Faw is characterized by its high salinity. The primary source of this salinity is the infiltration of saline water from the Persian Gulf, in addition to rainfall. Salt levels in the groundwater are lower in areas adjacent to the Shatt al-Arab or irrigation canals due to recharge that occurs there; however, it remains saline water. This water is not suitable for any type of use, whether for drinking or irrigation. It causes many problems, such as preventing the cultivation of areas where the water table is high and close to the surface due to waterlogging and high soil salinity. This water also causes other issues with the drainage of wastewater, in addition to damaging the foundations of buildings and various civil structures.

To solve the water problems, the Iraqi government excavated a 128-kilometer-long irrigation canal. Its water is of good quality, with salt concentrations not exceeding 1400 ppm, compared to concentrations of 2800 ppm in the water of the Shatt al-Arab. This canal aims to transport fresh water from the Kuteiban area north of Basra city center to Ras Al-Baysha in the far south of Al-Faw, in addition to irrigating the agricultural lands it passes through. This was necessary due to the encroachment of saline water from the Shatt al-Arab into Basra Governorate.

== Urban Classification ==
The area of Al-Faw city is 3,775 square kilometers. Residential use occupies the largest share, accounting for 60% of the total area. The city's land was divided using a grid system characterized by long, straight, parallel streets intersecting with cross streets at right or near-right angles. Due to the city's alignment along the Shatt al-Arab, it has taken a rectangular shape. Internal roads within the city account for 18.5% of its total area, and the flat topography of the land facilitated the adoption of this type of planning, which in turn influenced the design of residential units.

A further 0.9% of the city's area was allocated for commercial use in the form of modern market units in some districts. However, these were unsuccessful in providing services to the city's residents due to their unsuitable locations, leading to the emergence of numerous scattered shops throughout its neighborhoods. For industrial use, an area of 0.6% was allocated, but it was never actually developed. In practice, current industrial uses are spatially intermixed with commercial uses.

Approximately 12.11% of the area was allocated for various public and community services. Meanwhile, green areas account for 2.1% of the land, represented by the establishment of two parks—one at the city's entrance and the other on the banks of the Shatt al-Arab. A total of 5.73% of the city's overall area was designated for recreational and sports facilities, as well as public squares for celebrations, where some memorials commemorating the battle to liberate the city were erected.

== Healthcare ==
The city contains a single 50-bed hospital, which opened in 1958, and two primary healthcare centers, one located in the north and the other in the south. The hospital provides services for all the inhabitants of the city and the surrounding rural area. However, the city suffers from a clear deficiency in meeting the population's healthcare needs. This is due to the limited number of medical specialties available at the hospital, coupled with its location on the northern outskirts of the city near the city gate. This causes difficulties for residents, particularly those living in the southern neighborhoods, which are relatively far from the hospital.

== Economy ==
The location of Al-Faw city at the head of the Persian Gulf has given it economic importance, both agriculturally and commercially, as it is a port for oil exports. Additional factors include the phenomenon of tides and their usefulness for tidal irrigation, and the presence of salt flats.

The city's area is 488 km^{2}, which has the potential to increase due to the sediments deposited by the Shatt al-Arab. The prevailing climatic elements in Al-Faw have helped make it a suitable area for cultivating various crops. A large part of Al-Faw is dedicated to date palm cultivation, which represents 6.2% of the production of Basra Governorate and 4% of Iraq's total date production. The city is also known for its henna trees and grapevines.

=== Fishing ===
The majority of the city's residents rely on fishing for their livelihood. However, this profession faces several problems, including infringements upon Iraqi fishing boats and their detention by Kuwaiti and Iranian coast guards, as well as violations of Iraqi territorial waters. These issues are exacerbated by the clear absence of the Iraqi Navy's role in protecting the lives and property of the fishermen.

In the early morning hours, fishermen gather in the "Nakta" area, a location on the bank of the Shatt al-Arab east of the city, where they bring their catch to be sold. The fish market in the city is thriving in both quantity and variety, offering different types of fish and shrimp. The quantity of fish supplied meets the demands of the city's population, with the surplus being sold to other provinces.

=== The Al-Faw Salt Flats ===
Salt flats are unlined water channels where continuous seepage of water into the ground causes the water table to rise, eventually accumulating on the surface. Due to the extremely high evaporation rate, which can reach 2.5 meters per year from exposed water surfaces, the salts become concentrated, transforming the exposed water into salt flats.

Located in the center of the Al-Faw Peninsula, the water in this area dried up over time and turned into zones of salt accumulation. There are two main salt flats in Al-Faw: one is in northern Al-Faw on the eastern shore of the Khor Abdullah in the Al-Sabakh land area, and the other is in southern Al-Faw, extending between Al-Qishla and Hoz Al-Rashid. The latter is considered an old salt flat, constructed during the British occupation of Iraq, and is also located in the Al-Sabakh land area. It is connected by a bridge to a road that links it to the Persian Gulf area.

The Basra Salt Company, affiliated with the General Company for Geological Survey and Mining in the Al-Faw District, is one of the companies of the Ministry of Industry and Minerals. It is responsible for the commercial exploitation of the raw salts found in the region.

== Excavations ==
In 1955, local residents accidentally discovered a vertebra and a rib from a humpback whale in the Al-Faw area. They were found on the coast of Khor Abdullah between Al-Faw and Kuwait. The mentioned rib was being used as a small bridge over a stream for people to cross.

The story of the rib and vertebra dates back to January 6, 1955, when the Natural History Museum in Baghdad received a letter from the administration of the Abu Al-Khasib District, which stated the following:

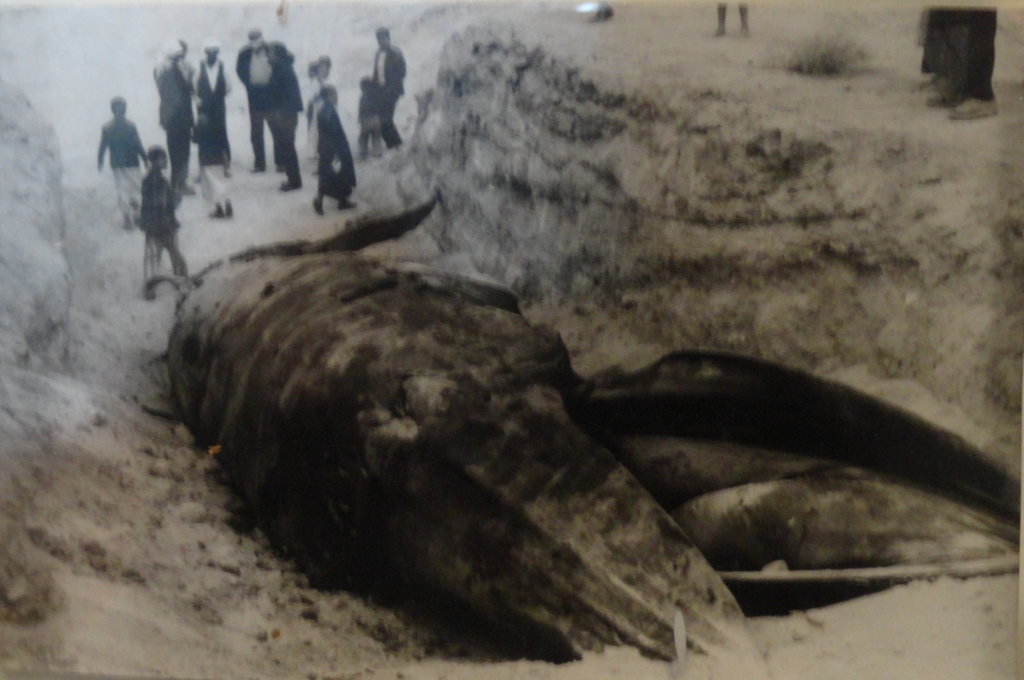
The Humpback whale discovered in the Al-Faw, Iraq, in 1955.

"We were informed by the Director of the Al-Faw Sub-District on May 31, 1955, that a large bone vertebra and a part of a rib from the spinal column had been found by chance in the possession of a local resident. They appear to be remnants of a very large marine animal, believed to be a whale, which were found on the Gulf coast between Al-Faw and Kuwait approximately five years ago. The mentioned rib was being used as a bridge over one of the small streams for locals to cross".

This event was recorded by Robert Hatt in 1959, who identified the whale as a Humpback whale (Megaptera novaeangliae). He mentioned an older report suggesting that a Turkish military vessel had killed the whale with its artillery a hundred years earlier in the Shatt al-Arab, after which its bones were transported to one of the villages surrounding the area.

== See also ==
- Grand Faw Port
- Al-Faw Palace
- Umm Qasr
