= Operation Quds-2 =

- Part of Iran–Iraq War
Date	June 25, 1985
Location	Hur al-Hawizeh, East of the Tigris River in Iraq
Result	Breaking the resistance of the Ba'athist forces in Iraq -- by the Islamic Revolutionary Guard Corps

Belligerents
Republic of Iraq	Iran

Commanders and leaders
Iraqi Ba'athist Army	Islamic Revolutionary Guard Corps

Casualties and losses
312 killed	None

Operation Quds-2 (Persian: عملیات قدس-۲) is one of the operations of the Iran–Iraq War, which was launched on July 25, 1985, in the "Hor al-Hawizeh" (Hawizeh Marshes) operational zone by the forces of the Islamic Revolutionary Guard Corps (of Islamic Republic of Iran).

The military code of the operation Quds-2 was "Ya Muhammad Rasulullah (PBUH)" and its goal was in order to neutralize the counterattack of the Ba'athist forces of the Iraqi army around the area of "Al-Bayda".

At the operation Quds-2 which was conceived as an amphibious military operation, Islamic Revolutionary Guard Corps killed 312 Iraqi forces, and at the end of the operation liberated 15 square kilometers of the northern zone of Hur al-Hawizeh as well as destroying 30 boats and 15 water police-posts of Ba'athist forces of Saddam. An area of over 150 km2 was recovered by the Iranian offensive in the sector of the Umm al-Naaj Lake.

== See also ==
- Operation Quds-1
