= Operation Quds-1 =

- Part of Iran–Iraq War
Date	14–18 June 1985 (4 days)
Location	Hur al-Hawizeh, East of the Tigris River in Iraq
Result	Iranian victory

Belligerents
Iraq	Iran

Commanders and leaders
(Iraq) Saddam Hussein	(Iran) Ruhollah Khomeini (Islamic Revolutionary Guard Corps)

Operation Quds-1 (Persian: عملیات قدس-۱) is the name of a military operation which was started on June 14, 1985 during the Iran–Iraq War. The operation was launched by the forces of the Islamic Revolutionary Guard Corps of the Islamic Republic of Iran under the code name of "Ya Mohammad Rasoolullah" (Persian: یامحمد رسول‌الله) in the "Hur al-Hawizeh (Hawizeh Marshes)" operational zone which is located at the east of the Tigris River in Iraq. The goal of Quds-1 operation was to annihilate the Ba'athist forces in Iraq and in order to disrupt the cohesion of Saddam's army in the region; The size of the area was approximately one hundred and eighty square kilometers.

At the mentioned operation, which lasted for about 4 days, the forces of the Islamic Revolutionary Guard Corps captured two checkpoints, namely "Abu-Dharr" and "Abu-Laila"; and as a result, the Iraqi Ba'athist resistance was finished. At the initial step/day of the operation, Saddam's army did chemical/explosive attacks against Iranians by utilizing PC7s and helicopters.

== See also ==
- Operation Quds-2
- Operation Badr
