= Hisham Sabah al-Fakhri =

Iraqi field commander

Hisham Sabah al-Fakhri (Arabic: هشام صباح الفخري; 1940 – 7 May 2008) was a senior Iraqi field commander. He was commander of the Fourth Army Corps in 1983, 1985 (Operation Badr) and of the Sixth Army Corps from 1984 to 1986. He is sometimes cited as "one of the heroes of the war against Iran" during the Iran–Iraq War.

== See also ==
- First Battle of al-Faw
- Operation Badr (1985)
