= Second Battle of al-Faw =

1988 battle in the Iran–Iraq War

- Part of Tawakalna ala Allah Operations of the Iran–Iraq War
Date	17–18 April 1988
Location	al-Faw Peninsula
Result	Iraqi victory
Territorial changes	Iraqis liberate the Al-Faw peninsula

Belligerents
Iraq	Iran

Commanders and leaders
(Iraq) Saddam Hussein (Iraq) Gen. Adnan Khairallah (Iraq) Gen. al-Rashid (Iraq) Lt. Gen. al-Rawi (Iraq) Gen. Hussein Rashid al-Tikriti	(Iran) Ruhollah Khomeini (Iran) Akbar Hashemi Rafsanjani (Iran) Esmaeil Sohrabi (Iran) Mohsen Rezaee (Iran) General Esmael Shorabi

Strength
~100,000 Republican Guard soldiers 1,200 tanks, 1,300 armored vehicles, 1,400 artillery pieces and 100 attack helicopters	20,000–40,000 Basij militia 100 tanks and 150 artillery pieces

Casualties and losses
800 killed 20 armored vehicles lost	5,000 killed, 10,000 captured All remaining tanks and artillery pieces captured

The Second Battle of al-Faw (also known as the Operation Ramadan Mubarak (Blessed Ramadan), fought on 17 April 1988, was a major battle of the Iran–Iraq War. After their defeat at the First Battle of al-Faw two years earlier, the newly restructured Iraqi Army conducted a major operation to clear the Iranians out of the peninsula.

The Iraqis concentrated well over 100,000 troops from the battle-hardened Republican Guard. The heavy use of chemical weapons quickly disarrayed the Iranian defenses, which consisted of 15,000 Iranian Basij volunteers. The southern wing of the assault consisted of the Republican Guard's Madinah and Baghdad Divisions, which assaulted the Iranian lines and then allowed the Hammurabi Armoured Division to pass through and move along the southern coast of the peninsula and into al-Faw itself.

Meanwhile, the regular Iraqi Army's VII Corps attacked the northern end of the line with the 7th Infantry and 6th Armoured Divisions. While the 7th Infantry's attack became bogged down, the 6th Armoured broke through the Iranian lines, the 1st Mechanised Division pushed through, and later linked up with the Republican Guard divisions outside al-Faw. Thus the peninsula had been secured within thirty-five hours, with much of the Iranians' equipment captured intact. The battle saw extensive use of chemical warfare by the Iraqis against the Iranians.

== Prelude ==
Following the Karbala campaigns of 1987, but before the end of summer, the Iraqi Army started secretly practicing maneuvers in the desert behind Basra. The training maneuvers involved multiple army and Republican Guard divisions and huge mock-ups of objectives Iraq intended to seize back from Iran.

The Iranian defeat during the Karbala Campaign of the previous year had dented the Iranian Army's manpower, supplies, and morale, and as a result increasing numbers of Iranians were turning against the war. This meant that the Iranian Army's mobilization attempt for a renewed offensive against Iraq in 1988 had failed. The Iranian military leadership had also decided at a major strategic conference that the Iranian Army had to undertake extensive retraining and rearming in order to defeat Iraq, which could in turn take up to 5 years. As a result, the Iranian Army did not try to invade Iraq in 1988. Meanwhile, with extensive supplies from Europe as well as the Soviet Union, the Iraqi army had extensively re-armed, becoming the 4th largest military in the world. Despite that, they had chosen to stay on the defensive and let Iran bleed itself in costly offensives, in which the majority of the operations ended in defeat or stalemate hence a failure to deliver the desired results.

The al-Faw peninsula had been under Iranian control since 1986 when they launched a surprise attack on the peninsula as part of the larger Operation Dawn 8.

The taking of the peninsula by the Iranians was a strong blow to Iraq's prestige whilst also threatening Basra from the south-east. The retaking of the peninsula was seen by Saddam Hussein as a top priority, and Iraqi General Maher Abd al-Rashid promised to recover the peninsula, going so far as to offer his daughter Sahar to Saddam's son Qusay to show his certainty. Planning for the recovery of the peninsula began soon after it had been taken by the Iranians, and was largely done in secret by a small group of 6, with Saddam Hussein himself being heavily involved in the planning process.

For the second battle the Iraqis had concentrated over 100,000 soldiers, of whom approximately 60% where from the Republican Guard, against some 15,000 Iranian Basij volunteers. The Iraqi command had expected the battle to take several weeks, but Iraq managed to seize the peninsula in a single day with only minimal losses due to the collapse of the Iranian troops. This stunning success led the Iraqi command to decide to expand the original battle into a larger offensive campaign against Iran.

== The battle ==
The attack on al-Faw was preceded by Iraqi diversionary attacks in northern Iraq, using the Iranian opposition group the Mujahedeen-e-Khalq, which supported Iraq.

The attack was timed to coincide with the beginning of the holy month of Ramadan, and when the Iranians were rotating their troops. At 5:00 AM, Iraq launched a massive artillery and air barrage of Iranian front lines. With the help of American satellite imagery, key areas such as supply lines, command posts, and ammunition depots, were hit by a storm of mustard gas and sarin nerve gas, as well as by conventional explosives. Using helicopters, the Iraqis 7th Corps under the command of General Maher Rashid moved down the Shatt-al-Arab waterway and blocked the rear of the Iranians on the peninsula.

The advanced Republican Guard units launched their attack, moving down the peninsula 21 miles south of Umm Qasr. The attacks were preceded with numerous chemical weapons bombardments, killing and/or sickening close to the majority of the unprepared Iranian troops on the peninsula. An estimated amount of more than 100 tons of chemical agents were used. The Third Corps drove down the Faw peninsula, while the Iraqi Special Forces moved through the marshy wetlands. At the same time, Iraqi naval infantry launched amphibious attacks onto the peninsula landing behind Iranian defence lines. They broke through Iran's complex water and barbed wire defensive barriers rapidly. Iraq took some casualties clearing the minefields on the peninsula, but captured the town of Faw 35 hours into the attack.

The Iranians were completely taken by surprise during the battle, and had failed to regroup to counterattack. They were outnumbered 6:1 in infantry and had virtually no armor. Many, if not most, were killed or sickened by Iraqi mass chemical weapons bombardments. They fought stubbornly at first, but then began to retreat. Iraqi fighter jets bombed two of the three pontoon bridges crossing the Shatt-al-Arab, causing chaos among the Iranians. Less than two days into the attack, the Iranians had been driven from the Faw peninsula.

== Aftermath ==
Within 35 hours of the battle, Iraq's flag flew above the town of Faw. Within 48 hours, all of the Iranian forces had been killed or cleared from the al-Faw Peninsula, with survivors retreating via a single pontoon bridge remaining. The day was celebrated in Iraq as Faw Liberation Day throughout Saddam's rule. The Iraqis had planned the offensive well. Prior to the attack the Iraqi soldiers gave themselves poison gas antidotes to shield themselves from the effect of the saturation of gas. The heavy and well executed use of chemical weapons was the decisive factor in the Iraqi victory. Iraqi losses were a little more than 1,000.

The attack coincided the same day as the US (unofficially allied with Iraq at that time) launched Operation Praying Mantis on Iran, destroying their navy. The double blows had a severe effect on Iran.

To the shock of the Iranians, rather than breaking off the offensive, the Iraqis kept up their drive, and a new force attacked the Iranian positions around Basra.[20] Following this, sensing Iranians weakness, the Iraqis launched a sustained drive to clear the Iranians out of all of southern Iraq.[26]:264

One of the most successful Iraqi tactics was the "one-two punch" attack using chemical weapons. Using artillery, they would saturate the Iranian front line with rapidly dispersing cyanide and nerve gas, while longer-lasting mustard gas was launched via fighter-bombers and rockets against the Iranian rear, creating a "chemical wall" that blocked reinforcement.

This battle was the beginning of the end of the Iran-Iraq War. By the end of the war, the Iraqis had managed to cause major defeats among the Iranian forces inside of Iraq, and demonstrated that they could invade Iran once again evidenced by their last offensive that captured the town of Dehloran which lay 30 km away from the border inside of Ilam province, Iran. The Iranian leadership realized that they could not win the war and that they would not be able to defend Iranian territory in the event of a renewed massive Iraqi invasion whereby it would be impossible to expel the Iraqis a second time, and that they had suffered many economic and material losses, and thus accepted the ceasefire.

== Bibliography ==
- Cordesman, Anthony H. (2003). The Combination of Iraqi Offensives and Western Intervention Force Iran to Accept a Cease-Fire: September 1987 to March 1989 (PDF) (Working document). Archived from the original (PDF) on 7 June 2013 – via csis.org.
- Farrokh, Kaveh (2011). Iran at War: 1500–1988. Botley, Oxford: Osprey Publishing. ISBN 978-1-78096-240-5.
