= Iyad Futayyih =

Iraqi general and Saddam loyalist (1942–2018)

Colonel General Ayad Futayyih Al-Rawi
- إياد فتيح الراوي
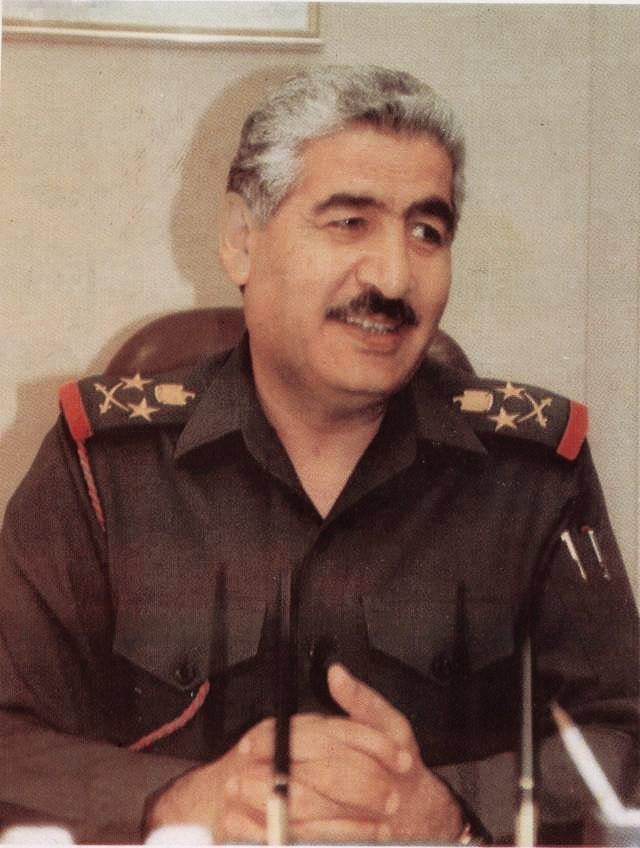
- Futayyih in 1990

Chief of the General Staff of the Army and the Armed Forces
- In office 1991–1995
- Preceded by: Hussein Rashid
- Succeeded by: Sultan Hashim

Personal details
- Born: 1942 Rawa, Kingdom of Iraq
- Died: 18 May 2018 (aged 76) Baghdad, Iraq
- Awards: Order of the Two Rivers (First Class)

Military service
- Allegiance: Iraq
- Branch/service: Iraqi Army
- Years of service: 1965–2003
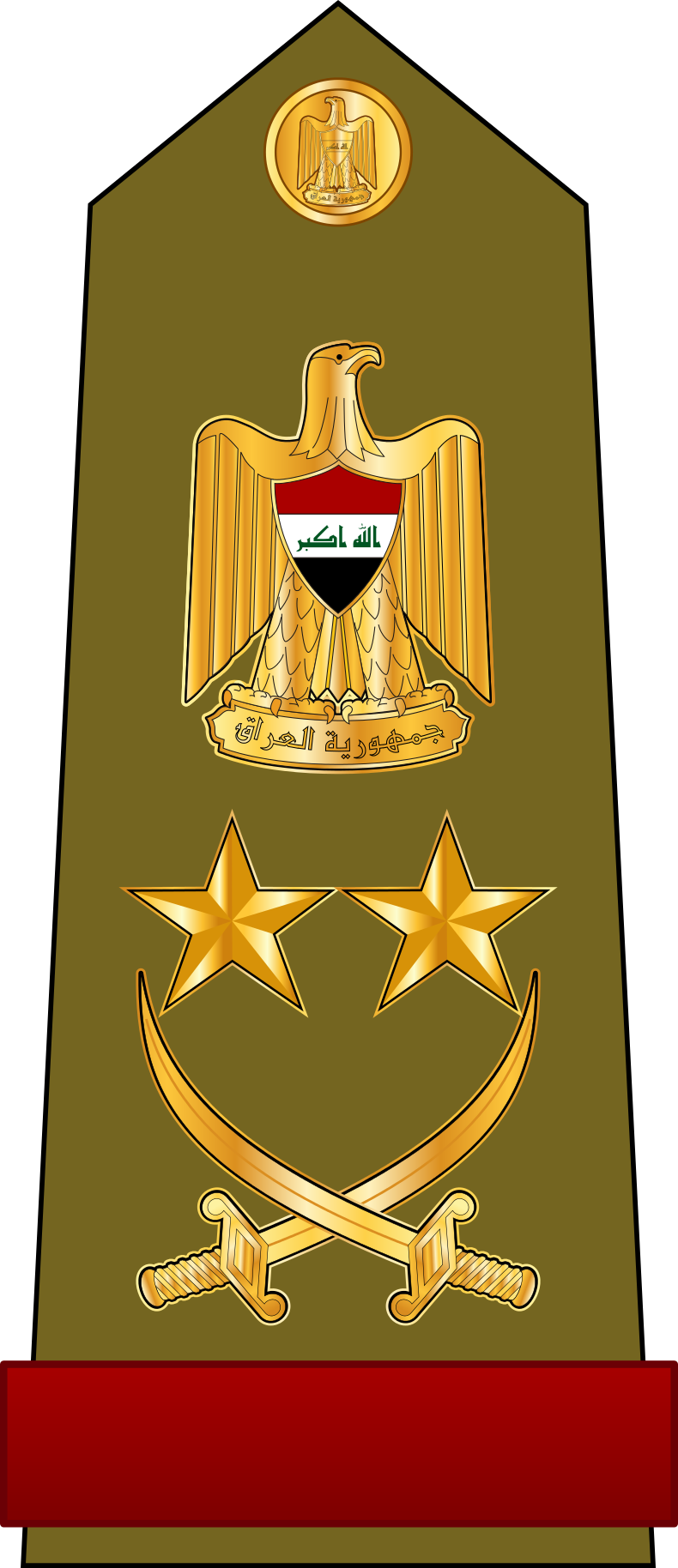
- Rank: Colonel general
- Unit: Republican Guard; Jerusalem Army
- Commands: Jerusalem Army Chief of Staff
- Battles/wars: Six-Day War; Yom Kippur War; Iran–Iraq War; Tawakalna ala Allah Operations; Second Battle of Al Faw; Persian Gulf War; Battle of 73 Easting; 2003 Invasion of Iraq

Colonel General Iyad Futayyih Al-Rawi (Arabic: إياد فتيح الراوي, romanized: ʾIyād Futayyiḥ; 1942 – 18 May 2018; also spelled Ayad Futayyih) was an Iraqi Army officer during Saddam Hussein's rule. He later served as the head of the Jerusalem Army. He started his service in the Iraqi Army as an officer in an armoured unit, later fighting in the Iran–Iraq War, receiving numerous medals and suffering a severe head wound whilst leading an Iraqi counterattack against an Iranian offensive. In all, Futayyih was awarded 27 medals during the Iran–Iraq War. He was perceived to be a staunch Saddam loyalist.

== Biography ==
Futayyih was born in Rawa in 1942, and died of a stroke in Baghdad on May 18, 2018.

== Iran–Iraq War ==
He served as commander of the Republican Guard forces at the Second Battle of al-Faw, which comprised some 60% of the forces deployed.

During his interview with the Iraqi Perspectives Project, he was named by General Hamdani as one of the few first-rate commanders. Hamdani lists one of the few reasons why Hussein Kamel's attempts to improve the quality of the Republican Guard during the Iran-Iraq War was successful was that he listened to Futayyih.

== Later career ==
Futayyih went on to serve as Governor of both Baghdad and Ta'mim Governorates.

He later became the Chief of Staff of the Al Quds Volunteer Army, a paramilitary force created in early 2001 in response to the beginning of the Second Intifada. The force's objective was seemingly to defeat Israel and liberate Palestine and Jerusalem, and the force was declared to be composed of some 21 divisions and 7 million Iraqis, although in reality the force was small, ineffective and largely a propaganda stunt to show support for the Palestinians.

Prior to the 2003 Invasion of Iraq, Futayyih was on a list of sanctioned individuals.

== Invasion and aftermath ==
Futayyih was arrested on 4 June 2003, following the U.S.-led invasion of Iraq. He was no. 30 of Central Commands Top 55 list, appearing as the seven of clubs in the Most-wanted Iraqi playing cards. Despite its claimed size, the Al Quds Army ended up playing virtually no role in the war.

In 2008 Futayyih received a life sentence for war crimes committed in the suppression of the 1991 uprisings in Iraq. He died in 2018 in prison.
