= Highway 6 (Iraq) =

Road in Iraq

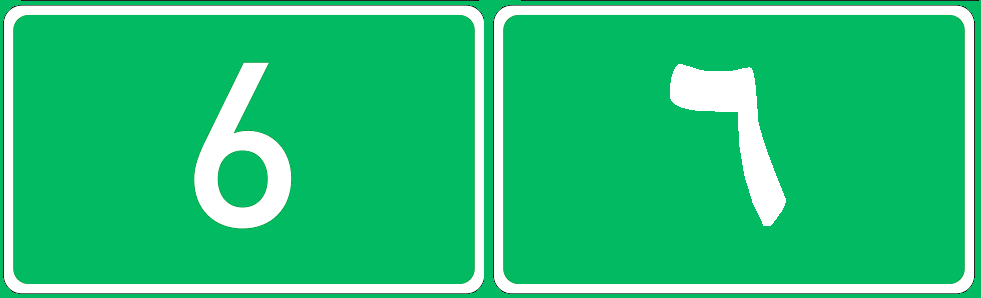
Highway 6
- ٦ طريق رقم

Location
- Country: Iraq

Highway system
- Highways in Iraq

Highway 6 is an Iraqi highway which extends from Baghdad to Basrah. It passes through Al Kut and Al Amarah.
