= Iraq–Europe Development Road =

Infrastructure project to connect West Asia with Europe

- Mission statement: Establish an economic corridor that connects West Asia with Europe; Increase security and stability in the region
- Type of project: Megaproject
- Products: 1,200-kilometre (750 mi) corridor for: high-speed railways; multi-lane highways; industrial hubs; telecommunications
- Country: Iraq–Turkey
- Budget: US$17–20 billion via the World Bank
- Status: In development (as of September 2026)

The Iraq–Europe Development Road (Note: Historically called the Dry Canal (Arabic: القناة الجافة, romanized: al-Qanāt al-jāffah)) (Arabic: طريق التنمية, romanized: Ṭarīq al-tanmiyah) is an ongoing strategic megaproject in Iraq aiming to establish the country as a gateway connecting West Asia with Europe by developing networks of railways, highways, ports, cities as well as internet infrastructure. The US$17–20 billion project which spans 1,200 kilometres (750 mi) via high-speed railways and multi-lane highways also establishes industrial hubs and telecommunications cables along the way. The project also aims to transform Iraq into an internet transit hub, with the capacity to transmit hundreds of terabits of data per second from West Asia to Europe. It is a large-scale and complex infrastructure project aimed at founding an economic corridor linking the Grand Faw Port in Basra to Europe through Turkey.

The project is designed to dramatically alter Iraq's transportation, energy, and urban living through industrial hubs required for commercial and freight operations. According to the World Bank, Iraq is gradually transitioning towards reconstruction and development, and the Development Road "could attract up to 13 million tonnes (14×10^{6} short tons) of international freight and 18 million tonnes (20×10^{6} short tons) of regional freight by 2040". The project is planned to be completed in three stages by 2028, 2033, and 2050, and will generate US$4 billion annually and create at least 100,000 jobs.

== Strategic and economic goals ==
"Dry Canal" during the Ottoman Iraq

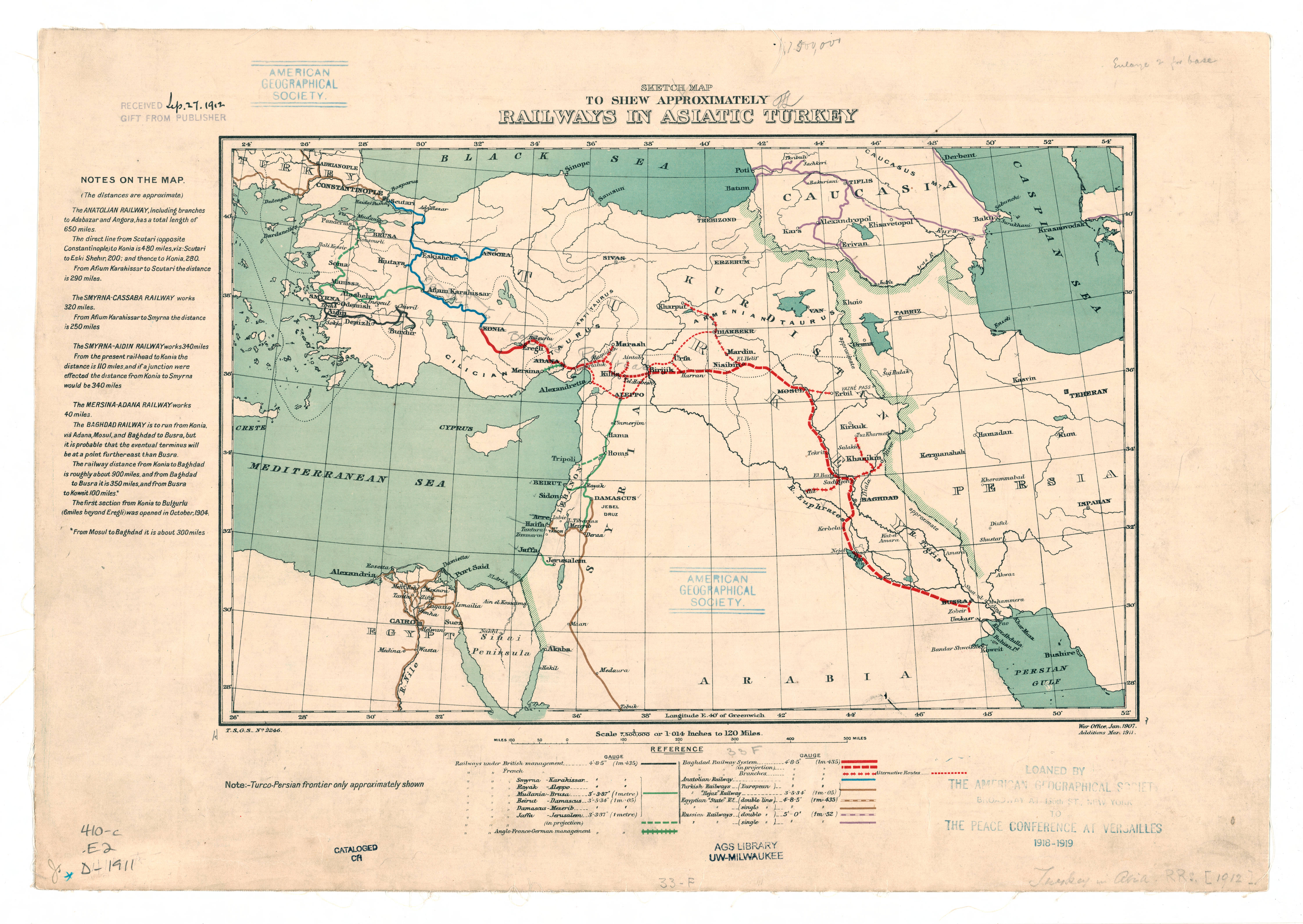
Iraq is where the geography always suggested, as a connection between the Gulf and Europe

It was historically referred to as the "Dry Canal" project. The core concept, as stated in its modern form, was first conceived and proposed in the 1980s. In May 2023, Baghdad hosted a summit which brought together transport ministers and officials from the European Union, the World Bank, GCC, Iran, Turkey, Syria and Jordan to discuss the establishment of the Development Road initiative. In April 2024, a quadrilateral memorandum of understanding on cooperation was signed by Iraq, Turkey, Qatar, and UAE. The transportation ministers from each country signed the deal. It also coincided with Turkish President Recep Tayyip Erdogan's visit to Baghdad.

=== Local achievements ===
An integrated Iraq will increase security and stability in the region. During the 2023 summit, Iraqi officials noted that

"Iraq has recovered and retrieved its pivotal political role in the region, becoming a political convergence point, the time has come for the country to retrieve its economic role".

The economy of Iraq has an oil-led growth model.

| Economic goals | Targets |
|---|---|
| Diversification | Non-oil transit by handling millions of tons of dry cargo each year |
| Job creation | Secondary industries (logistics, construction) and manufacturing (industrial hubs) |

=== Local challenges ===
The route navigates areas with complex local security dynamics, requiring coordination against localized insurgent groups. The current route sparks domestic political pushback and disputes regarding regional inclusion and funding.

=== Geopolitics (Iran, Hormuz, IMEC) ===
The region was situated at a crossroads between landmasses. The Baghdad governorate was a major centre of commerce, culture, and learning, and was home to one of the most important cities along the Silk Road during the Abbasid Caliphate, approximately 1,200 years ago. Could a globally integrated future for Iraq, supported by a diversified economy and substantial revenue growth, revive this period of prosperity?

Iraq was re-envisioned as a transit center to shorten travel time between Asia and Europe. In an attempt to compete with Egypt's Suez Canal, this route provides these Arab states of the Persian Gulf with a direct, secure land bridge to Europe. The route is expected to cut transit times between Asia and Europe by up to 11 days compared to the Suez Canal. In his final remarks, he highlighted that, "This new chapter for Iraq will revive and revamp the country’s ancient role as a key crossroads in regional and international trade. "In an entirely inland trip, a shipment from Poland to the UAE via Turkey and Iraq was completed in only 12 days. From Poland to the UAE would have taken 21 days, conducted multimodally via the Red Sea. De Pretto concluded by saying, "Today, we are not merely launching a transit system. We are celebrating a new chapter in Iraq’s journey towards prosperity, connectivity, and global relevance. The best chapters of Iraq’s history are still to be written."De Pretto pointed to the systemic resilience. Iraq could disperse risks across inland logistics networks. A single-point failure in maritime routes can halt the flow of significant resources, whereas land corridors allow for rerouting and redundancy. In De Pretto's explanation, integration could also be extended to the Middle Corridor (Trans-Caspian East–West route), positioning Iraq as a multimodal connector that could reduce transit times by 30%-40% compared to traditional sea routes.

The project is a direct competitor to the U.S.-backed India-Middle East-Europe Economic Corridor (IMEC).

Iran perceives that the corridor will reduce Baghdad's economic dependence on Tehran.

2026 Iran war is a "permanent" and "transformative" wartime shift. 2026 Strait of Hormuz crisis showed every container moving through Iraq is a reduction in Tehran’s leverage," said Middle East Council on Global Affairs analyst Muhanad Seloom. He also explained, "What was described by the Iraqi government as a flagship of Iraqi statecraft now has a regional rationale that governments and financiers treat as essential rather than aspirational."

== Core components ==
The 1,200-kilometre (750 mi) project with railway and highways which will connect the Great Faw Port, aimed to be the largest port in the Middle East. It was planned to be completed by 2025 to the Turkish border at an expected cost of US$17 billion.

In July 2024, the Iraqi Ministry of Transport announced that it had signed a contract with consulting firm Oliver Wyman to conduct the economic model for the Development Road. The firm will help market the project, supervise investments, and provide economic advisory services for strategic government projects.

=== Grand Faw Port ===
The southern anchor is being built. One of the world's largest ports and the largest in the Middle East. In addition, it is hoped that this will strengthen Iraq's geopolitical position in the region and worldwide. Once fully operational, it will be one of the largest container facilities in the Middle East, bypassing traditional maritime chokepoints like the Suez Canal and the Strait of Hormuz.

=== Transit network ===
A dual-track railway and multi-lane highway stretching from the port, moving north through Baghdad and Mosul, to the Fishkabore border crossing into Turkey. From there, it connects directly into Turkey’s existing transportation grids to access European markets.

==== Development (land acquisition, TIR convention, phases) ====
In March 2023, Iraq joined the TIR convention backed by the United Nations Economic Commission for Europe, a significant landmark in facilitating the logistics of the Development Road, and Rami Karout, Senior Advisor for Middle East Affairs at the International Road Transport Union (IRU) stated: "The success of the Development Road Project requires ensuring the security and safety of operations, which the TIR system provides through its advanced features, most notably the adoption of reliable operators according to strict international standards. Only approved companies are permitted to use the system, and violators are excluded."

On 24 March 2025, the IRU announced that the TIR system was set to go fully operational in Iraq starting from 1 April 2025. The announcement came after successful pilot operations from Turkey’s Mersin to Iraq’s Umm Qasr Port. Notably, the pilot operations demonstrated that the aforementioned journey can be completed in less than one week, compared with a minimum of 14 days via the Red Sea or up to 26 days via a reroute around the African continent. TIR’s Electronic Pre-Declaration (TIR-EPD) system will be integrated with Iraq’s URUK platform. IRU Secretary General Umberto de Pretto said, “Trucks will seamlessly transit the country and proceed along corridors offering a high level of security, opening a new chapter for the country and its role in international trade", adding, “With transport times and costs set to be slashed across the country and region, this will be a historic moment for global trade and broader economic integration in the Middle East.” UNECE Executive Secretary Tatiana Molcean noted, “The activation of the TIR system in Iraq will open up routes across the Middle East and make almost the entire Eurasian landmass – from China through Central Asia to Europe – TIR operational,” emphasising, “Most importantly, by ensuring greater connectivity between regional and international markets, it will help to boost trade and development.”

On May 15, 2025, in an effort to expedite the completion, the Ministry of Transport delivered cadastro maps (paper and electronic) indicating the centerline coordinates along with a table of plot and district numbers for the lands located within the route, which includes the governorates of Basra, Dhi Qar, Muthanna, and Diwaniyah.

On 3 June 2025, IRU held an official ceremony in Baghdad for Iraq's accession to the TIR convention, during which Secretary-General de Pretto stated, "Iraq’s accession to the TIR Convention sends a powerful message that the country is open for business and is committed to operating in a safe and stable environment," adding that, "This initiative is not only important for the transport sector but also plays a vital role in Iraq’s broader economic development."

The Iraqi Ministry of Transport's director of the State Company for Land Transport in Iraq, Murtadha Al-Shahmani, announced on 3 July 2025, that Iraq is fully ready to actively participate in the TIR Convention, supported by the Prime Minister and the Minister of Transport. He stated that Iraq has successfully conducted three trial operations under international supervision and officially started implementing the convention, positioning itself as a secure transit hub between the Middle East and Europe. The director emphasised that the government of Iraq aims to reduce reliance on oil revenues, and that receiving coordinated fees from key government departments such as Customs, Ports, Land Transport and the Residence and Passports Authority, will boost Iraq’s non-oil revenues, expecting over 1,000 trucks to pass through Iraq daily from several countries.

On 19 June 2026, the Iraqi Ministry of Transport announced that seven new international transit routes had opened across the country, with more than 1,000 successful cargo operations completed since Iraq joined the TIR convention.

| Phase | Target completion | Current status and milestones |
|---|---|---|
| 1 | 2028 | Core transport operations |
| 2 | 2033 | Scaling capacity, widening transit networks, and launching intermediate freight terminals |
| 3 | 2050 | 15 industrial cities and full pipeline/energy grid integrations |

==== Railway modernization ====
On 25 June 2025, The Washington Post reported that the World Bank had approved to finance a US$930 million project called the 'Iraq Railways Extension and Modernization Project' to rebuild the country’s outdated railway infrastructure, as well as to "improve services and increase freight capacity between the Umm Qasr Port… to the northern city of Mosul". Jean-Christophe Carret, director of the World Bank's Middle East Division, said: "As Iraq shifts from reconstruction to development, enhanced trade and connectivity can stimulate growth, create jobs, and reduce oil dependency." It is a dual-rail line for cargo and passenger trains, that spans 1,200 kilometres (750 mi) that traverses the entire length of the country. At peak capacity, 100 High-speed trains, with a maximum speed of 300 kilometres per hour (190 mph) for passenger transport and approximately 150 kilometres per hour (93 mph) with only a 12-hour night schedule for cargo. The whole network dedicates six hours a day exclusively to passenger services. Its capacity is 15 million passengers each year. Phase 1 capacity is 3.5 million containers of cargo per year, or approximately 20 million tonnes (22×10^{6} short tons), which will be raised 7.5 million containers and 30 million tonnes (33×10^{6} short tons) per year in Phase 3. By 2037, phase 2, the upgraded infrastructure is projected to handle 6.3 million tonnes (6.9×10^{6} short tons) of freight, 1.1 million tonnes (1.2×10^{6} short tons) of imports and exports, and 2.85 million passengers annually.

Main features
| Length | 1,179 kilometres (733 mi) |
| Freight stations | 15 |
| Passenger stations | 15 |
| Maintenance and passing loops | 4 |
| Operation control buildings | 2 |
| Maintenance for the line | 20 |
| Population served at the governorate level | 66.3% |
| Population served at the city center level | 32.5% |

In 22 September 2025, the Iraqi Ministry of Planning announced a plan to develop —with the backing of the World Bank— a high speed rail network system, the first phase of which will connect the city of Basra to Baghdad by the year 2031. In the second phase, the capital will be connected to the northernmost governorates, and the final phase will connect Iraq to Europe through Turkey. The planned project is estimated to have the annual capacity of 14 million passengers.

Railway segments
| Lot | Segment | km | mi |
|---|---|---|---|
| 1 | Faw-Basrah–Nassiriyah | 271 | 168 |
| 2 | Nassiriyah–Diwaniya–Najaf | 226 | 140 |
| 3 | Najaf–Hillah–Kerbala–Baghdad | 163 | 101 |
| 4 | Baghdad–Samarra–Baj | 199 | 124 |
| 5 | Baj–Mosul | 168 | 104 |
| 6 | Mosul–Rabia–Fishkabur | 152 | 94 |
| Total | | 1,179 | 733 |

==== Highway ====
On 26 June 2025, Polish hauler and logistics company Milton Group announced that it had completed its first full round trip using Iraq’s TIR corridors, marking it a successful first of its kind. The company also remarked that the trip, passing through Bulgaria, Türkiye, Iraq, Jordan, and Saudi Arabia before reaching its final destination in the UAE, typically lasts around 24 days, this time, courtesy of the new route through Iraq, it lasted only 10 days, representing a 58% reduction. IRU Secretary-General De Pretto said: "This marks only the beginning of what promises to be a landmark development for resilient regional connectivity across the Middle East via Iraq," emphasizing that the Iraqi corridor "offers more flexibility and resilience for operators navigating regional uncertainty."

Highway segments
| Lot | Segment | km | mi |
|---|---|---|---|
| 1 | Mosul–Fishkabur | 137 | 85 |
| 2 | Baiji–Mosul | 199 | 124 |
| 3 | Baghdad–Baiji | 205 | 127 |
| 4 | Baghdad–Najaf | 174 | 108 |
| 5 | Najaf–Nassiriyah | 225 | 140 |
| 6 | Nassiriyah–Um Qasr | 193 | 120 |
| Total | | 1,133 | 704 |

=== Industrial hubs ===
Transforming Iraq from a transit corridor into a primary production and manufacturing hub will include the construction of 15 industrial cities, logistics centers, and energy pipelines along the route. On 20 July 2025, in cooperation with consulting firms and under the supervision of Prime Minister Mohammed Shia al-Sudani, the Ministry of Transport announced a plan to establish industrial cities along the Development Road corridor, in addition to a tourist coast, to enhance investment opportunities and attract maritime tourism. The project includes the establishment of an integrated smart city within the Grand Faw Port complex, comprising residential, industrial, and service areas, in accordance with the Ministry's vision of creating a sustainable investor-friendly urban environment.

On 29 June 2025, the Iraqi Ministry of Communications (MoC) concluded the design for a project to provide telecommunications services for companies in the context of the Development Road. In a project nicknamed Civilizations Road, MoC announced that it had signed a contract with Turkish state-owned Türk Telekom in order to integrate Iraq and Turkey within a single telecommunications network, facilitating the provision of unified services to international companies.

| Industrial Hub | Production | Logistics | Energy | Telecommunication |
|---|---|---|---|---|
| Al-Faw (2010) | Gas | Maritime logistics | | |
| Babylon (2009) | Manufacturing | | | |
| Khor Al-Zubair (2007) | Industrial automation | | Oil | |

=== WorldLink project ===
In 2026, Iraqi and UAE companies announced plans to build a US$700 million international hybrid subsea and terrestrial fibre-optic cable network aiming to transform Iraq into an internet transit hub connecting Asia with Europe via Iraq and Turkey. The cable network begins with a submarine fibre-optic segment running from Abu Dhabi to Iraq's Faw peninsula in addition to reserve branches connecting to Qatar, Bahrain, Saudi Arabia and Kuwait. From Faw, a dual terrestrial fibre-optic segment will converge at Iraq's northern border with Turkey's network, where it will connect with the European backbone. The network is designed to deliver over 900 terabits per second, with a constant latency of 100 milliseconds between Europe and the Middle East.

== See also ==
- Eurasia
- Economic corridor
- Berlin–Baghdad railway
