= State Company for Maritime Transport =

Republic of Iraq State Company for Maritime Transport
- الشركة العامة للنقل البحري
- Emblem of Iraq

Agency overview
- Headquarters: Iraq
- Parent agency: Ministry of Transportation
- Website: http://www.scmt.gov.iq

Iraqi State Company for Maritime Transport is the Iraqi national maritime transportation company. It is one of the departments of the Iraqi Ministry of Transportation.

The company was established in 1952 (74 years ago).
