= First Battle of al-Faw =

1986 battle in the Iran–Iraq War

Coordinates: 29.9753°N 48.4725°E

- Part of Iran–Iraq War
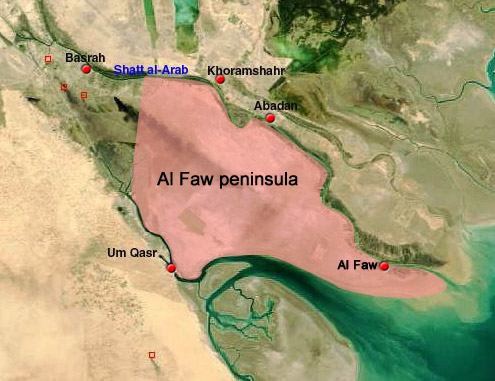
- Al-Faw peninsula, Iraq
Date	10 February 1986 – 10 March 1986
Location	Al-Faw peninsula, Iraq
Result	Iranian victory
Territorial changes	Iran captures the tip of the al-Faw peninsula

Belligerents
Iraq	Iran

Commanders and leaders
(Ba'athist Iraq) Maher Abd al-Rashid (Ba'athist Iraq) Hisham Sabah al-Fakhri (Ba'athist Iraq) Saadi Toma Abbas	(Iran) Akbar Hashemi Rafsanjani (Iran) Esmaeil Sohrabi (Iran) Mohsen Rezaee (Iran) Ali Sayad Shirazi (Iran) Morteza Ghorbani (Iran) Hossein Kharrazi (Iran) Amin Shariati

Units involved
126 infantry battalions 33 armoured battalions 23 mechanized battalions 29 commando battalions 20 Republican Guard battalions	140 infantry battalions 16 artillery battalions

Strength
Beginning: 1,000–5,000 troops Height of battle: 82,000 troops (Three mechanised divisions); 400+ aircraft 200+ helicopters	Beginning: 22,000–25,000 troops Height of battle: 133,000 troops Several tank companies 70 aircraft 70+ helicopters

Casualties and losses
3,000 killed 9,000 wounded 2,105 captured Destroyed: 74 aircraft 11 helicopters 400 tanks 200 APCs; 500 military vehicles 20 field artillery pieces 55 anti-aircraft artillery pieces 7 fast attack craft 5 engineering vehicles destroyed Captured by Iran: 80 tanks 40 APCs; 250 vehicles 35 field artillery pieces 150 anti-aircraft artillery pieces 3 radars 34 engineering equipment Other claims: 10,000 killed (February–March); 40–55 aircraft 100+ tanks	10,000 killed 25,000 wounded (10,000 casualties of chemical attacks)

The First Battle of al-Faw was a battle of the Iran–Iraq War, fought on the al-Faw peninsula between 10 February and 10 March 1986. The Iranian operation is considered to be one of Iran's greatest achievements in the Iran–Iraq War. The Iranians were able to capture the al-Faw peninsula, cutting off Iraqi access to the Persian Gulf in the process; this in turn hardened Iraqi attitudes to prosecute the war. The Faw peninsula was later recaptured by Iraqi forces near the end of the war.

On 9 February 1986, Iran launched Operation Dawn 8, a sophisticated and carefully planned amphibious assault across the Shatt al-Arab (Arvand Rud) river against the Iraqi troops defending the strategic al-Faw peninsula, which connects Iraq to the Persian Gulf. The Iranians defeated the Iraqi defenders, mostly Iraqi Popular Army, capturing the tip of the peninsula, including Iraq's main air control and warning center covering Persian Gulf, as well as limiting Iraq's access to the ocean. Iran managed to maintain their foothold in Al-Faw against several Iraqi counter-offensives, including Republican Guard assaults and chemical attacks, for another month despite heavy casualties until a stalemate was reached.

The First Battle of al-Faw was a major success for Iran who now held an important strategic position, but worried other states in the region, primarily in Kuwait and Saudi Arabia, who increased their support for Iraq. The battle damaged the prestige of Saddam Hussein and the Iraqi government, who began extensively improving defenses for the threatened major city of Basra. Although the battle officially ended in March 1986, intermittent clashes continued for two years until April 1988, when Iraq recaptured the al-Faw peninsula at the Second Battle of al-Faw.

== Prelude ==
The Iran–Iraq War had been fought for nearly 6 years. While the Iranians had driven the Iraqis off of their soil in 1982, Iranian efforts to invade Iraq and cause the downfall of the regime of Saddam Hussein had been fruitless. Iran had suffered due to a lack of spare parts and in its inability to replace lost equipment, and relied heavily on human wave attacks and light infantry warfare. Meanwhile, the Iraqis (especially after 1982) were heavily supported by foreign nations. The war bogged down into a stalemate.

In the face of increasing Iraqi armament and manpower, as well as increasing problems on their own side, Iran could no longer rely on outnumbering Iraqi troops. While the infantry and human wave assaults would remain key to their attacks throughout the war, Iran began to rely more heavily on infiltration and surprise attacks, as a part of limited light infantry warfare. In contrast to Iraq's static defences and heavy armour, Iran began training troops in infiltration, patrolling, night-fighting, marsh warfare, and mountain warfare. They also began training thousands of Revolutionary Guard commandos in amphibious warfare, as southern Iraq is marshy and filled with wetlands. Iran used speedboats to cross the marshes and rivers in southern Iraq and landed troops on the opposing banks, where they would dig and set up pontoon bridges across the rivers and wetlands to allow heavy troops and supplies to cross. Transport helicopters were used as well, ferrying troops to the battlefield. Iran largely focused on infiltrating through areas that were difficult for Iraqi armour, air power, and artillery to be used, such as valleys, the marshes of southern Iraq, and the mountains of northern Iraq.

Iran began to plan for a major offensive. While deceptively making it seem like the attack was to be against the southern Iraqi city of al-Basra (like most of Iran's attacks had been), the attack was really aimed at the southern al-Faw peninsula, touching the Persian Gulf, and the only area of Iraq that touched the open ocean.

== Preparations ==
The operation was planned by Iran's army chief of staff and the Iranian defense minister. It was planned entirely by professional military officers, but the battlefield commanders were a mix of regular army and Revolutionary Guards officers. The Iraqis were taken by surprise, as they had not expected the Iranians to be able to land troops on the peninsula. The Iranians hoped to cut off Iraq from the Persian Gulf, making the country landlocked, and threaten Basra from the south. More importantly, Iran hoped to deliver a series of blows against Iraq that would lead to its downfall via attrition warfare. The operation was to be called Operation Valfajr 8 (Dawn 8).

== Iranian attack ==
Operation Dawn 8
- Part of Iran–Iraq War; First Battle of al-Faw
Date	9–25 February 1986
Location	al-Faw peninsula
Result	Iranian victory: Tactical Iranian success; Iraqi defensive failure; Iraqi counter-attack succeeds in containing the Iranian offensive to the tip of the peninsula
Territorial changes	Iran captures the tip of the al-Faw peninsula

Belligerents
Iraq	Iran

Commanders and leaders
(Iraq) Maher Abd al-Rashid (Iraq) Hisham Sabah al-Fakhri (Iraq) Saadi Toma Abbas	(Iran) Hossein Kharrazi

Casualties and losses
5,000 killed or wounded 1,500 captured	600 killed 2,000 wounded

On 9 February 1986, the Iranians launched Operation Dawn 8 (Persian: عملیات والفجر ۸), in which 100,000 troops comprising five Army divisions and 50,000 men from the Revolutionary Guards and the Basij paramilitary advanced in a two-pronged offensive into southern Iraq. Unlike the earlier offensives, Dawn 8 was planned entirely by professional Army officers, all of whom were former officers of the Imperial Iranian Army during the rule of the Shah. The Iranians launched a feint attack against Basra (around al-Qurnah) from 9–14 February, attempting to split Iraq's 3rd and 7th Corps; this was stopped by the Iraqis. Meanwhile, the main Iranian blow fell on the strategically important Al-Faw peninsula, which fell after only 24 hours of fighting. Iran's northern forces launched human wave attacks, while the southern forces launched an armored attack against the enemy. Both attacks were stopped with heavy Iraqi firepower, and the Iranians suffered 4,000 casualties. However, the Iraqis became convinced that this was the main point of attack, and diverted their forces to that sector; this is now recognised as a deception. Instead, Iran's primary objective was Iraq's al-Faw peninsula, the only area in Iraq that touched the Persian Gulf.

=== Peninsula landings ===
Taking place between 9 and 25 February, the assault across the Shatt al-Arab achieved significant tactical and operational surprise, allowing the Iranian forces to initially gain a quick victory over forces of the Iraqi Popular Army in the area. Considered a turning point in the war, unlike the tactics of human wave assaults used elsewhere at the front, the operation was a sophisticated and carefully planned amphibious operation.

The Iranians launched their assault on the peninsula at night, their men arriving on rubber boats. Iranian Navy SEALs spearheaded the offensive despite a shortage of gear. Prior to this action Iranian Naval Commandos performed reconnaissance of the Faw peninsula. The Iranian SEALs penetrated an obstacle belt and isolated Iraqi bunkers whose troops had taken cover from the heavy rains inside or were sleeping. Iranian demolition teams detonated charges on the obstacles to create a path for the Iranian infantry waiting to begin their assault.

The Iranian command was fortunate in taking advantage of torrential rain during the initial 24 hours that made it impossible for Iraq to bring to bear its superior air and artillery firepower. Not only did the amphibious landings provide a significant lodgement behind Iraq's tactical front, but they also created a psychological shock wave throughout the Persian Gulf region. Soon after the initial landings, Iranian combat engineers were able to construct bridges to improve the flow of ground troops into the lodgement area.

The first Iranian attack used frogmen against Umm al-Rasas island in the Shatt Al-Arab across from Khorramshahr as a stepping stone to reach the Al-Faw peninsula. They captured the island, but an Iraqi counterattack recaptured it three days later.

Iran's second simultaneous attack was aimed at the foot of the peninsula. Using a division size strike force of the Revolutionary Guard's amphibious forces on small boats and large LST boats, they landed at six points on the peninsula, after an intense artillery and air bombardment. The Iranians were well supported by artillery and air power during this attack. Iranian forces drove north along the peninsula almost unopposed, capturing it after only 24 hours of fighting. The resistance, consisting of several thousand poorly trained soldiers of the Iraqi Popular Army, fled or were defeated, taking 4,000 casualties and 1,500 becoming prisoners of war. The Iranian strike force overran the tip of the peninsula, in 24 hours, and while most of the frontline Iraqis fled, the town of Al-Faw held out until 14 February. The Iraqis had not expected an Iranian attack at this area, assuming that the Iranians were incapable of launching a major amphibious operation.

Due to being taken by surprise, and poor weather, the Iraqis were unable to launch a major counterattack, but began to fight back as early as 12 February. Iran quickly in the meantime set up pontoon bridges across the Shatt al-Arab, and rapidly moved 20,000 troops from the Basij, Revolutionary Guards, and Regular Army onto the peninsula. To avoid detection by American satellites and Iraqi warplanes, the components of the bridges were welded together underwater during the night. Oxygen tanks were then strapped to the sides of the bridge, causing it to rise to the surface. Afterwards, they dug in and set up defenses.

After taking the Faw, the Iranians built a pontoon bridge and began to dig in.

== Iraqi counteroffensive ==
Initial attempts by Iraq to dislodge the Iranian troops made little impression due to lack of coordination, but cost Iraq 20-25 aircraft lost. Iran's successive operations toward Umm-al-Qasr, which had been undertaken with the intention to cut off Iraq's access to the Persian Gulf, were contained only with considerable losses to Iraq's Republican Guard despite a three-pronged counterattack on 12 February led by General Maher Abd al-Rashid, supported by some of Iraq's best commanders Hisham Sabah al-Fakhri, and Sa'adi Tuma 'Abbas al-Jabburi. However, lack of effective combined arms tactics by the Iraqi troops, and soft ground limiting tank mobility eventually halted the counterattack despite intensive close air support.

On 12 February 1986, the Iraqis began a counter-offensive to re-take the Faw, which failed after a week of intense fighting. Saddam sent one of his best commanders, General Maher Abd al-Rashid and the Republican Guard to begin a new offensive to re-capture the Faw on 24 February 1986. A new round of intensive fighting took place, centered on a three-pronged counterattack. The Iraqi offensives were supported by helicopter gunships, hundreds of tanks and a huge bombing offensive by the Iraqi Air Force. Despite having an advantage in firepower and the extensive use of chemical warfare, the Iraqi attempt to re-take the Faw again ended in failure.

Saddam Hussein and the Iraqi high command still were convinced that the main Iranian attack was towards Basra, and did not take word of the Iranian capture of al-Faw seriously. There were only two mechanized divisions moved to attack the Iranians at Faw. But soon the Iraqi leadership realized the deception and began to plan accordingly. On 13–14 February, the Iraqis organized a hastily planned counterattack. But it was largely a mechanized counterattack with little light infantry, in an area with thick mud and little room to maneuver, and Iraqi air and artillery attacks were muffled against the muddy terrain. The Iraqis were thus bound to two roads, and they were picked off by Iranian artillery, AH-1 Cobra helicopters and anti-tank commando units. In desperation, Iraqi aircraft flew as many as 300 combat sorties against the Iranians, but with few targets (the Iranians forces consisted of dug in infantry, moving only at night and helped by poor weather) they achieved little effect and lost 15–30 aircraft against Iranian air defense (using Hawk missiles) for their efforts.

Unsurprisingly, the Iraqi counterattack failed after a week of heavy fighting.

The force led by General Maher Abd al-Rashid consisted of Iraq's V Corps, with two mechanized divisions. Nevertheless, even the elite of Iraqi troops, while fighting ferociously, used poor tactics and relied on trying to evict the Iranians through sheer brute force. Iraq fired over 600 rounds of ammunition and launched 200 sorties of aircraft every single day, using both high explosive and large quantities of chemical weapons. Their most widely used chemical weapon was mustard gas, which paralyzed Iranian activity on the battlefield, and killed 700–1,800 immediately. 8,000 were stricken, and many more would eventually die afterward. The poison gas may have been the deadliest weapon for the Iraqis fighting the Iranians.

Thus a new round of heavy fighting took place. The Iraqi offensives were supported by helicopter gunships, hundreds of tanks, and a large bombing offensive by the Iraqi Air Force. The Iraqis desperately launched head on attacks against the Iranians, who were well armed with anti-tank weapons and made short work of the attackers. The Iraqis were forced to stick to the main roads and rely on their armor for firepower, and even in dryer areas were unable to maneuver. Often, the tanks and infantry failed to cooperate, and the tanks attacked without infantry support, taking massive losses. Iraq's infantry also took heavy losses against the more experienced Iranian infantrymen, who were experienced in night warfare. Iraq was losing whole battalions against the Iranians. Iraqi artillery was ineffective in the marshes, and as Iranian air defenses dispersed and shot down Iraqi observation aircraft, and the shells that landed were muffled in the mud. Iraq used so much ammunition that they faced shortages, and had to scour international markets and place orders from their supporters in order to replenish their stocks. They lost another 25 aircraft to Iranian interceptor aircraft (such as the F-14 Tomcat) and air defenses. The only effective weapon Iraq used against the Iranians was poison gas, and even that was dampened somewhat by the muddy ground on the peninsula.

To make matters worse for the Iraqis, on 4 March, they suffered another heavy blow when two Iranian F-5E Tiger II's bombed the headquarters of Iraq's 5th Mechanized Division, killing the general and his entire staff. Iraq attempted to launch a clumsy amphibious attack against the rear of the Iranians, which cost them several more battalions. Iraq had taken such massive losses that they were forced to resort to ordering citizens to donate blood, trying to recruit foreign staff and tourists in hotels, and using city taxis to transport the dead and wounded to morgues and hospitals in Iraq. Facing heavy air losses against the Iranians over Faw, the Iraqi Air Force launched bombing attacks on Iranian civilian and industrial targets as a form of counterattack (see War of the Cities). Iraqi aircraft did have one notable success on the peninsula though. Iranian helicopters had transported some of their own armor to the peninsula. One of Iran's armored columns was hit by Iraqi aircraft, damaging several M-60 tanks and M-113 armored personnel carriers.

Iraq's desperate attempts to retake al-Faw again ended in failure, costing them many tanks and aircraft: their 15th Mechanised Division was almost completely wiped out. The capture of al-Faw and the failure of the Iraqi counter-offensives were blows to the Ba'ath regime's prestige, and led the Gulf countries to fear that Iran might win the war. Kuwait in particular felt menaced with Iranian troops only 16 km (9.9 mi) away, and increased its support of Iraq accordingly.

Iraq launched another counterattack on 10 March, which was unsuccessful. In March 1986, the Iranians tried to follow up their success by attempting to take Umm Qasr, which would have severed Iraq from the Gulf and placed Iranian troops on the border with Kuwait. However, the offensive failed due to Iranian shortages of armor. Thus as a result, fighting on the peninsula stabilized, and became a stalemate.

== Kuwait ==
Iranian troops succeeded in reaching the Khor Abdullah waterway opposite Kuwait, creating reports in the local media that Iranian forces had surrounded the Umm Al-Qasr Iraqi naval base. Iraq's main air control and warning centre located north of the Al Faw peninsula that was covering the Gulf area of operations, was also captured by Iran. This created a state of near panic in neighbouring Kuwait and Saudi Arabia.

== Aftermath and impact ==
The fall of al-Faw and the failure of the Iraqi counter-offensives were huge blows to the prestige of the Ba'ath regime, and led to fears all over the Persian Gulf that Iran might win the war. In particular, Kuwait felt menaced with Iranian troops only 16 km (10 mi) away, and increased its support of Iraq accordingly. During the Second Battle of al-Faw in April 1988 Iraq re-captured the peninsula.

The First Battle of al-Faw "officially" ended in March, however heavy intermittent clashes and combat operations continued on the peninsula until the end of 1986 and even as late as 1988, with neither side being able to displace the other. The battle bogged down into a World War I-style stalemate in the marshes of the peninsula. 17,000 Iraqi troops and 30,000 Iranian troops fell victim on the peninsula. On 3 September, Iran launched Operation Karbala 3 against two Iraqi oil platforms around Umm Qasr and Kuwait's Bubiyan Island, the latter of which hosted Iraqi troops. If successful, early warning radar sites on the platform would be destroyed. Iranian amphibious commandos and Revolutionary Guards landed on the first platform (al-Amayeh), defeating the Iraqi troops while Iranian artillery destroyed the second (al-Bakr). Iraq then launched air attacks and drove the Iranians off the al-Amayeh platform.

The occupation of al-Faw placed the city Basra at risk of being attacked, rumors of a final Iranian offensive against Basra proliferated. To help defend itself, Iraq had built impressive fortifications and Iraq devoted particular attention to the southern city of Basra. It built concrete-roofed bunkers, tank- and artillery-firing positions, minefields, and stretches of barbed wire, all shielded by an artificially flooded lake 30 kilometers long and 1,800 meters wide.

The Iranians put their foothold in the Al Faw peninsula to good use. They used the peninsula as a launch pad for Silkworm missiles which were deployed against shipping and oil terminals in the Persian Gulf, and also against Kuwait, which supported Iraq throughout the war. It gave them a chokehold on any goods and supplies coming up the Shatt al Arab and Khawr Abd Allah waterway for Iraq.

Saddam Hussein vowed to eliminate the Iranians "at all costs," and in April 1988 the Iraqis succeeded in regaining the Al Faw peninsula during the Second Battle of al-Faw.

During the battle, Iranian Ah-1J Cobra helicopters downed one Iraq MiG and 5 helicopters in air-to-air combats.

== Losses ==
An attempt to exploit the breakout from the captured territory, to completely sever Iraq's link to the Persian Gulf, was contained.

In a panic move, several Persian Gulf states lobbied Syria to influence Iran from further attempts to cut off Iraq's oil export facilities which would have had deleterious effect on world oil prices.

== Order of battle ==
=== Iran ===
Khatam-ol-Anbiya Headquarters

Karbala Headquarters
- 25th Karbala Special Division
  Commanded by Morteza Ghorbani
- 27th Mohammad Rasulullah Division
- 7th Vali-e-Asr Division
  Commanded by Mohammad Raoofi-Nezhad
- 41st Tharallah Division
  Commanded by Qasem Soleimani
- 31st Ashura Division
  Commanded by Amin Shari'ati
- 5th Nasr Division
- 8th Najaf Ashraf Division
  Commanded by Ahmad Kazemi
- 14th Imam Hossein Division
  Commanded by Hossein Kharrazi
- 17th Ali ibn Abi Taleb Division
  Commanded by Gholamreza Jaafari
- 32nd Ansar-ol-Hossayn Independent Brigade
- 15th Imam Hassan Independent Brigade
- 44th Qamar-e Bani-Hashem Independent Brigade
Nooh Headquarters
- 19th Fajr Division
- 33rd Al-Mahdi Independent Brigade
  Commanded by Jaafar Asadi
- 33 artillery battalions of Islamic Republic of Iran Army Ground Forces

Yunes 1 Headquarters
- Kowsar Flotilla of Islamic Republic of Iran Navy

Yunes 2 Headquarters
(belonging to the Islamic Republic of Iran Navy)
Raad Headquarters
(air support and air defence; belonging to the Islamic Republic of Iran Air Force)
Shahid Soleiman Khater Headquarters
(air assault, medevac, heliborne and transportation; belonging to the Islamic Republic of Iran Army Aviation)
Qods Headquarters (diversionary operations)
- 21st Imam Reza Brigade
- 10th Sayyed-osh-Shohada Brigade
- 18th Al-Ghadir Brigade
Najaf Headquarters (diversionary operations)

- Jihad of Construction from Khorasan, Fars, Isfahan, and Khuzestan provinces

=== Iraq ===
7th Corps: (the brigades are mostly from 15th and 26th divisions)

- 414, 29, 702, 704, 442, 502, 111, 110, 104, 47, 501, 419, 48, 39, 22, 23, 2, 602, 603, 703, 96, 95, 108, 421, 424, and 5th Infantry Brigades
- 440th, 441st, 443rd Coastal Infantry Brigades
- 30, 16, 34, 42, 26th Armored Brigades, 17th Tammuz, al-Rafidin, Dhu al-Noorain Tank Battalions, 43rd Battalion of 5th Division
- 25, 20, 15, 8 and 24th Mechznized Brigades
- 65th, 66th, and 68th Special Forces Brigade
- Republican Guard
  - 1st Mechanized Brigade
  - 2nd Commando Brigade
  - 3rd Special Forces Brigade
  - 4th Mechanized Brigade
  - 10th Armored Brigade
  - 1 commando battalion
- Commando units:
  - Commando brigades from 3rd, 4th, 6th, and 7th Corps
  - 73rd Brigade of 17th Division
  - Hattin Battalion
  - 5th Battalion of 26th Division
  - Commando Battalion of 15th Division
- Popular Army
  - 6 qati's under command of 26th Division
- Iraqi Navy
- Iraqi Air Force
- Iraqi Army Air Corps

== In popular culture ==
The Season One of the war documentary Ravayat-e Fath depicts Operation Dawn 8.

== Legacy ==
The Valfajr torpedo produced domestically for the Iranian Navy has been named after Operation Dawn 8.

== See also ==
- Battle of Mehran
- Second Battle of al-Faw

== Bibliography ==
- Woods, Kevin; Murray, Williamson; Elkhamri, Mounir. "Saddam's War: An Iraqi military perspective on the Iran-Iraq War" (PDF). Institute for National Strategic Studies.
- "Phase Five: New Iranian Efforts at "Final Offensives",1986-1987" (PDF). Archived from the original (PDF) on 30 May 2016.
- Pollack, Kenneth M. (2004). Arabs at War: From the Ottoman Conquest to the Ramadan War. University of Nebraska Press. ISBN 9780803206861.
