= Al-Bu Nasir =

Arab tribe in Iraq

Al-Bu Nasir ألبو ناصر
- Arab tribe
- Ethnicity: Arab
- Nisba: Al-Nasiri (الناصري)
- Location: Mainly Saladin Governorate, minor presence in other parts of Iraq and Syria
- Descended from: Ahmed "Nasir al-Din" ibn Hussein "al-Iraqi" ibn Ibrahim "al-Arabi" ibn Mahmoud "al-Basri" ibn Abd al-Rahman ibn Abdullah Qasim "al-Mubarak" ibn Muhammad Khuzam "al-Salim" ibn Abdul Karim "al-Wasiti" ibn Saleh Abd "al-Razzaq" ibn Muhammad ibn Sadr "al-Din Ali" ibn Izz al-Din Ahmed al-Sayyad
- Parent tribe: al-Sayyad
- Population: 35,000
- Branches: Al-Bejat; Albu Khattab clan; Albu Hussein Al-Omar; Albu Abd al-Ghafoor clan; Albu Muslat clan; Abu Bakr clan; Albu Hazaa clan; Albu Abdel Moneim clan; Albu Kati clan; Albu Najm clan; Albu Musa Al-Faraj clan; Albu Fayyad; Albu Abdel Hamid; Al-Latifatat; Albu Haj Ahmed clan; Albu Khasra clan; Albu Kara Ahmed; Al-Ja'farah
- Language: Arabic
- Religion: Sunni Islam

Al-Bu Nasir (Arabic: ألبو ناصر) is one of the Arab tribes of Iraq. Al-Bu Nasir is an Arab tribe of around 35,000 people who primarily inhabit the town of Tikrit and the surrounding area of northern central Iraq, as well as many other areas in south and central Iraq.

== History ==
Although not very numerous, the Al-Bu Nasir nonetheless obtained a reputation of being "a difficult lot of people, cunning and secretive, whose poverty drove most of them to pervert the Bedouins' legendary qualities of being warlike and fearless." Like many Iraqi tribes, it follows the Hanafi fiqh and it traced its origins to the Arabian Peninsula, they maintained cordial ties with other related clans and tribes.

The tribe rose to prominence in the 1960s, when one of its members, Ahmed Hassan al-Bakr, seized power in Iraq. Bakr's successor, Saddam Hussein, was also a member of the Al-Bu Nasir and the tribe became a crucial element of his hold in power from 1979 to 2003. Saddam drew heavily on the tribe to fill the upper echelons of his government and in particular to manage his security apparatus, notably the Intelligence Service and the Special Republican Guard. Most of the key posts in the Iraqi government were held by members of the Beijat clan group and Majid extended family to which Saddam belonged; some elements of the regime's security apparatus, such as Saddam's bodyguards, were recruited exclusively from the al-Bu Nasir

The relatively small size of the tribe was, however, an obstacle to Saddam's ability to fully "tribalise" the institutions of the Iraqi government. He recruited tens of thousands of supporters, whom he placed in command positions in the Iraqi Army, from a number of other tribes allied to the al-Bu Nasir. The resulting network of tribal alliances, centred on the al-Bu Nasir and bound to them by payment and patronage, provided the backbone of Saddam's regime.

The power of the al-Bu Nasir and their tribal allies reached its zenith in the 1990s, when Saddam's regime was under great strain from the effects of international sanctions. Tribal chiefs were given extensive patronage, money and weapons as well as membership of the national assembly as a means of binding them to the regime. The old Ba'ath Party structures were to some extent sidelined in favour of an explicitly tribal power structure centred on the al-Bu Nasir. However, the 2003 invasion of Iraq and the overthrow of Saddam Hussein greatly reduced the influence of the al-Bu Nasir in the new Iraq.

== Notable members ==
- Youssef Izz al-Din al-Nasiri, Minister of Education from 1936 to 1937
- Ahmed Matlab, Minister of Culture 1967
- Ahmed Hassan al-Bakr, President of Iraq from 1968 to 1979
- Saddam Hussein, President of Iraq from 1979 to 2003
- Adnan Khairallah, the Defence Minister of Iraq from 1979 to his death in 1989
- Uday Hussein and Qusay Hussein, sons of Saddam Hussein
- Ali Hassan al-Majid, former Iraqi Defence Minister and cousin of Saddam Hussein
