= Al-Faw peninsula =

Landform in southeastern Iraq

Al-Faw Peninsula
Native name: شبه جزيرة الفاو
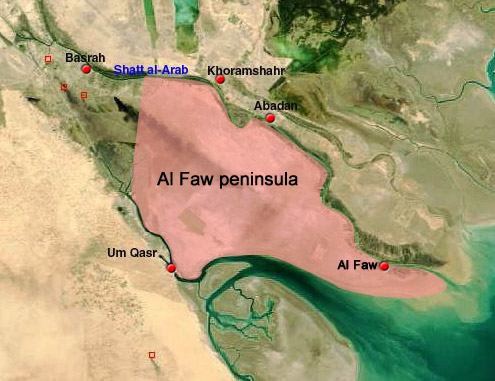
- al-Faw peninsula, Iraq
- Interactive map of Al-Faw Peninsula

Geography
- Location: Persian Gulf, southeast Iraq
- Coordinates: 30°11′N 48°10′E

Administration
- Iraq
- Basra Governorate
- Largest settlement: Basra

Demographics
- Languages: Arabic language
- Ethnic groups: Arabs

The Al-Faw peninsula (Arabic: شبه جزيرة الفاو; also transliterated as Fao or Fawr) is a peninsula in the Persian Gulf, located in the extreme southeast of Iraq. The marshy peninsula is 20 km (12 mi) southeast of Iraq's third largest city, Basra, and is part of a delta for the Shatt al-Arab river, formed by the confluence of the major Euphrates and Tigris rivers. The al-Faw peninsula borders Iran to the northeast, with the cities of Abadan and Khorramshahr on the opposite side of the Shatt al-Arab, and Kuwait to the southwest, opposite from Bubiyan Island and Warbah Island, near the Iraqi city of Umm Qasr.

Al-Faw, the only significant town on the peninsula and its namesake, is a fishing town and port which during Saddam Hussein's presidency featured the main naval base of the Iraqi Navy. The remainder of the al-Faw peninsula is otherwise lightly inhabited, with few civilian buildings or settlements and most of its few residents involved in the fishing, oil, or shipping industries. It is the site of a number of important oil installations, most notably Iraq's two main oil tanker terminals: Khor al-Amaya and Mina al-Bakr, due to its chief importance as a strategic location controlling access to the Shatt al-Arab waterway and thus access to the port of Basra.

== History ==
=== Iran-Iraq War ===
During the Iran–Iraq War in the 1980s, al-Faw was bitterly contested due to its strategic location at the head of the disputed Shatt al-Arab waterway and was the site of many large-scale battles. On 11 February 1986, the Iranians capitalized on the weakness of the Iraqi defences located at the southernmost tip of the peninsula by launching a surprise attack against Iraqi troops defending al-Faw. The Iraqi units in charge of the defences consisted mostly of poorly trained Iraqi Popular Army conscripts that collapsed when they were suddenly attacked by Iranian Pasdaran (Revolutionary Guard) forces.

It marked the first time that the Iranians had successfully invaded and occupied Iraqi territory. The Iranians defeated several Iraqi Republican Guard counter-offensives and managed to hang on to their foothold.

The occupation of al-Faw placed Basra at risk of being attacked. The Iranians also used the peninsula as a launch pad for Silkworm missiles which were deployed against shipping and oil terminals in the Persian Gulf, and also against Kuwait, which supported Iraq throughout the war.

On 17 April 1988, the newly restructured Iraqi Army began a major operation, "Ramadan Mubarak," which was aimed to clear the Iranians out of the peninsula. The Iraqis concentrated well over 100,000 troops from the Republican Guard versus 15,000 second-rate Iranian Basij soldiers.

By using sarin nerve gas, artillery barrages and air bombardments, the Iraqis eventually expelled the Iranians from the peninsula within 35 hours, with much of their equipment captured intact. The event was marked as an official national holiday under the former regime of Saddam Hussein, celebrated as the Faw City Liberation Day.

=== Gulf War ===
The 1991 Gulf War was fought south and west of al-Faw, but the peninsula's military installations were heavily bombed by Allied forces during the conflict. The Allied forces effectively closed down all of Iraq's shipping activities and thus rendered its access to the Shatt al-Arab and the Persian Gulf useless.

=== 2003 invasion of Iraq ===
The peninsula was one of the first targets of the Coalition forces in the 2003 invasion of Iraq, with British, American and Polish troops involved. Forces from the Royal Marines, US Marines and the Polish GROM staged a successful midnight amphibious assault on the peninsula. All of them were attached to the British 3 Commando Brigade. Their goal was to secure the port of Umm Qasr to allow humanitarian goods to be shipped in, and to secure the key oil installations located in the area before they could be sabotaged by retreating Iraqi forces. The Mina al-Bakr oil terminal was seized by SEAL Teams 8 and 10, as well as US Navy EOD personnel. The Khor al-Amaya oil terminal was seized by GROM operators. The peninsula fell quickly with minimal Iraqi resistance, but unexpected fierce resistance in Umm Qasr required several days of fighting before the town was secured.

The British forces, based at Camp Driftwood, provided the security and counter-smuggling force on land, and the American forces provided maritime assistance. Camp Driftwood was handed over to Iraqi control in March 2007 by troops from 1st Battalion Royal Yorkshire Regiment.

== See also ==
- List of places in Iraq
- Al-Faw Palace
- Al-Fao artillery system
- Al-Faw
