= 2003 attack on Karbala =

Battle during the Iraq War

- Part of the invasion phase of the Iraq War
Date	March 24, 2003
Location	Karbala, Iraq 32.616667°N 44.033333°E
Result	Iraqi victory

Belligerents
United States: 11th Regiment, 3rd Infantry Division; United Kingdom: Air support provided by British Royal Air Force	(Ba'athist Iraq) Iraq: 2nd Armored Brigade, Medina Division, Republican Guard

Commanders and leaders
(United States) Tommy Franks	(Ba'athist Iraq) Saddam Hussein (Ba'athist Iraq) Ali Hassan al-Majid (Ba'athist Iraq) Ra'ad al-Hamdani

Strength
31 AH-64 Apaches	90 tanks Several hundred vehicles

Casualties and losses
1 Apache crashed after takeoff 1 Apache shot down 29 Apaches damaged At least 1 wounded 2 pilots captured	12 tanks 6 S-60 AA guns
- Location of Karbala within Iraq.

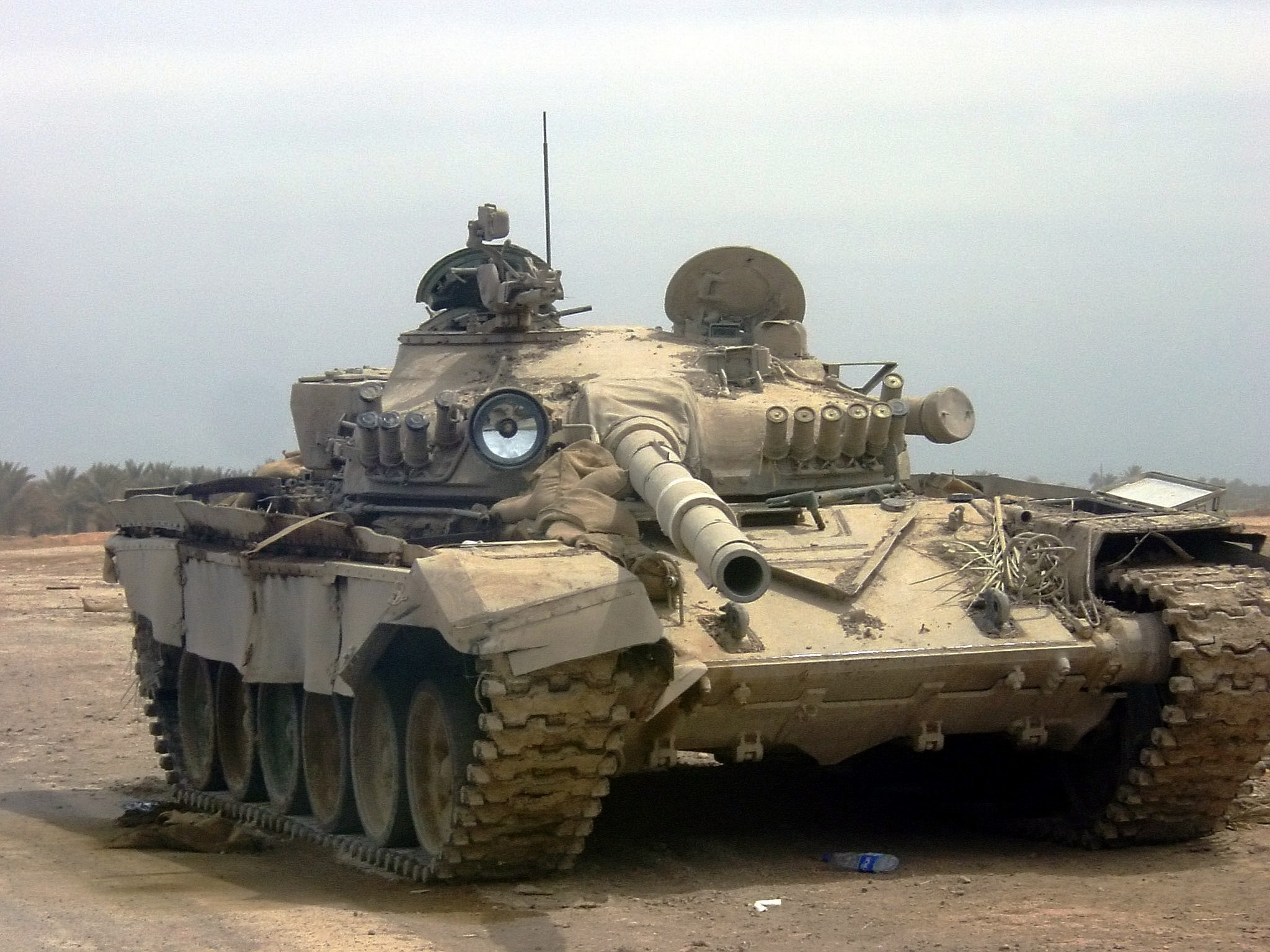
Lion of Babylon tank

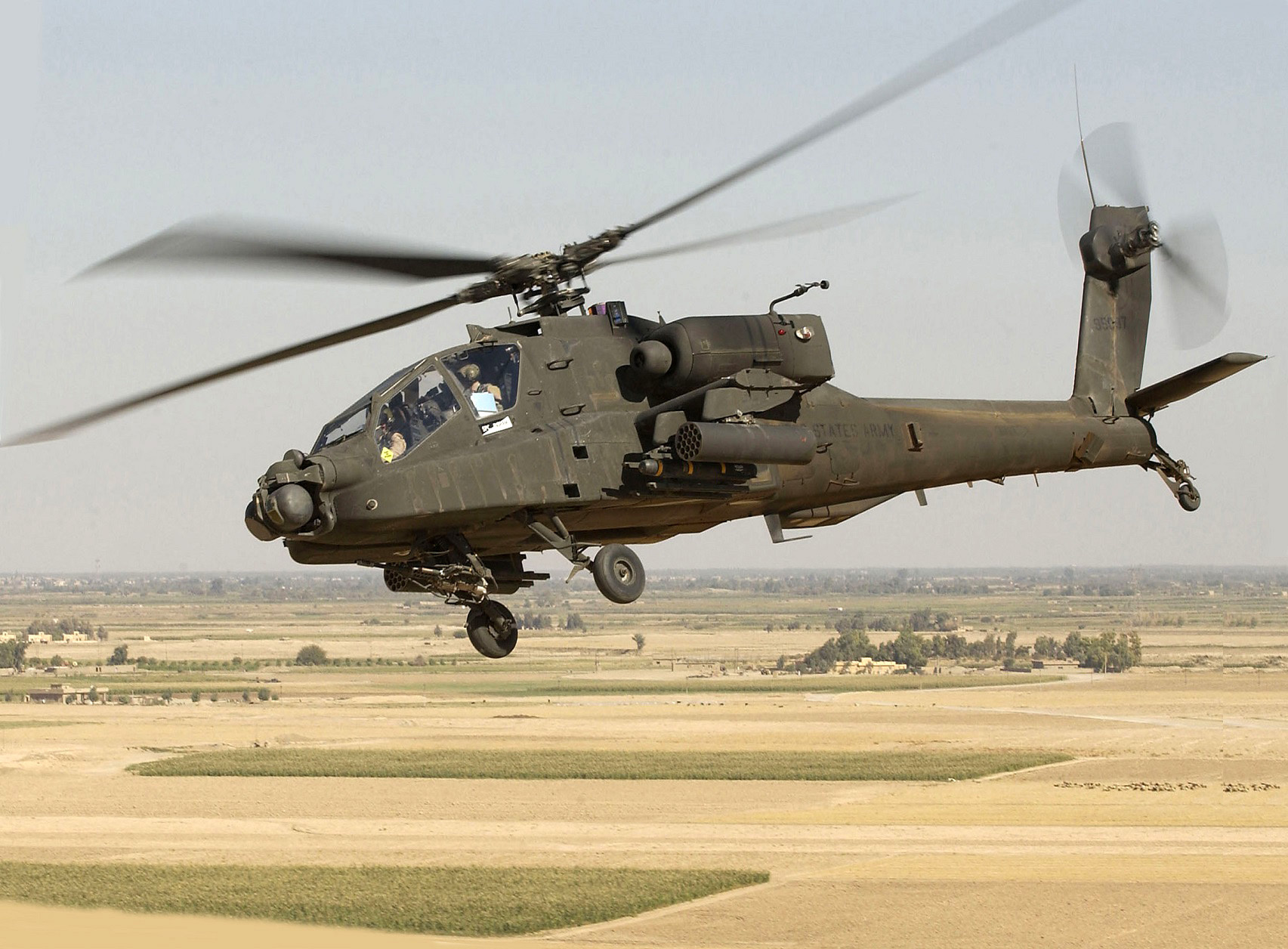
AH-64 Apache

The 2003 attack on Karbala was an unsuccessful strike on the Iraqi Republican Guard's Medina Division by the U.S. 3rd Infantry Division during the 2003 invasion of Iraq. The Medina Division was mostly deployed along the Karbala gap, west of the city of Karbala itself. The Iraqi division was targeted as it was the best equipped Iraqi unit, and its destruction would negatively affect Iraqi military morale. The Medina Division sustained only limited damage during the engagement.

The defeat for the Americans resulted in one AH-64 Apache being shot down intact. The two pilots were captured and shown on television along with the helicopter. Pentagon officials stated the captured Apache was destroyed via airstrike the following day, Iraqi officials claimed a farmer named Ali Ubaid Mankash with a Czech-made Brno rifle shot down the Apache. After the invasion, the farmer denied any involvement.

== Background ==
The U.S. sought to continue its shock and awe campaign by crippling the elite Medina Republican Guard division, thus demoralizing the enemy.

In the aftermath of the Gulf War, the Iraqis learned from the no fly zones over their country. The threat of small arms fire from Iraqi soldiers was gravely underestimated by the U.S. attack helicopters participating in the attack.

== Difficulties ==
The AH-64 Apache helicopters of the U.S. Army's 11th Attack Helicopter Regiment, faced several problems before the operation. The terrain around Baghdad was not desert, but urban sprawl. Experience from the Battle of Mogadishu of 1993 showed that helicopters are vulnerable over urban areas. Intelligence was inadequate. The information on the enemy's disposition was sketchy, forcing the helicopters to search the target area themselves. Some targets, including 30 T-72 tanks, were not present on the battlefield.

An accelerated timetable caused coordination issues. The Third Infantry Division moved ahead of schedule, causing the mission to be pulled in 24 hours. Suppression of enemy air defences occurred in accordance with the accelerated schedule even though the Apaches were behind schedule. The Apaches arrived only after a three-hour delay. The fighter-bombers had left the area by then and the helicopters were without support. The three hour interval allowed Iraqi air defences to recover.

== Engagement ==
The 31 AH-64 Apaches of the 11th Attack Helicopter Regiment took off from Tactical Assembly Area Vicksburg, which was inside Objective Rams. One Apache crashed immediately after takeoff when its pilot became disoriented. When the Apaches turned north toward Karbala, signals intelligence picked up over 50 Iraqi cell phone calls alerting the Iraqi forward units of their approach. As the helicopters came within range, the Iraqis signaled their troops to open fire by turning off the city's power grid for several seconds. Ground troops then opened up with a barrage of PKM, NSV, ZU-23-2, and AZP S-60 fire.

Lieutenant Jason King, gunner of Apache "Palerider 1-6", was hit by AKM fire in the neck and suffered a severe hemorrhage, but he never lost consciousness. He was later evacuated to Germany for surgery and returned to his unit a few weeks later. The helicopters scattered in search of the Medina Division, but were hampered by poor intelligence.

Apache "Vampire 1-2", flown by Warrant Officers David S. Williams and Ronald D. Young Jr., was forced down into a marsh after gunfire severed its hydraulics. Its radio was also hit, preventing communication with the other helicopters. Attempting to flee the crash scene, both men swam down a canal, but were captured by armed civilians. The Iraqi government would later show the helicopter on TV and claim that it had been shot down by a farmer with a Brno rifle; however due to the high volume of anti-aircraft fire and the armor of the Apache, it is unlikely that a bolt-action rifle was responsible.

The Apaches turned back for Tactical Assembly Area Vicksburg after a half-hour of combat. Most were without functioning navigation equipment. At least two narrowly avoided a mid-air collision. Post-battle analysis indicated the American gunships were targeted in a deliberately planned ambush with cannon fire, RPGs, and small-arms all emanating from camouflaged fire teams.

== Aftermath ==
Of the 29 returning Apaches, all but one suffered serious damage. On average, each Apache had 15-20 bullet holes. One Apache took 29 hits. Sixteen main rotor blades, six tail blades, six engines, and five drive shafts were damaged beyond repair. In one squadron only a single helicopter was fit to fly. It took a month until the 11th Regiment was ready to fight again. The casualties sustained by the Apaches induced a change of tactics by placing significant restrictions on their use. Attack helicopters would henceforth be used to reveal the location of enemy troops, allowing them to be destroyed by artillery and air strikes.

Thomas E. White, the U.S. Secretary of the Army, stated, "we were very fortunate we didn't lose more aircraft."

== See also ==
- Lion of Babylon (tank)
- Battle of Karbala (2003)

== Bibliography ==
- Atkinson, Rick (2008). In the Company of Soldiers. Paw Prints. ISBN 1-4395-6638-0
- Bernstein, Jonathan (2005). AH-64 Apache Units of Operations Enduring Freedom and Iraqi Freedom. Osprey Publishing. ISBN 1-84176-848-0
