= Battle of the Karbala Gap (2003) =

American war with Iraqi forces

Coordinates: 32.6161°N 44.0342°E

- Part of the 2003 Invasion of Iraq
- Destroyed Iraqi Lion of Babylon tank on Highway 9 south of Karbala Gap
Date	2–4 April 2003
Location	Outside Karbala and Al Musayib, Iraq
Result	U.S. victory

Belligerents
United States	Iraq

Commanders and leaders
(United States) Maj. Gen. Buford Blount II	(Ba'athist Iraq) Lt. Gen. Ra'ad al-Hamdani (Ba'athist Iraq) Faiq Abdullah Mikbas (Ba'athist Iraq) Riyadh Hussein Nayeri (Ba'athist Iraq) Hamid Ismail Darash (Ba'athist Iraq) Colonel Hassani (Ba'athist Iraq) Rukan Ujaili (Ba'athist Iraq) Lieutenant-Colonel Qais

Strength
US 3rd Infantry Division	Iraqi Republican Guard Medina and Nizar Divisions

Casualties and losses
1 Killed by friendly fire; unknown number wounded 1 tank damaged	680–940 Killed in action; Unknown captured/wounded Hundreds of armored vehicles destroyed

The Battle of the Karbala Gap occurred during the 2003 invasion of Iraq. The Karbala Gap is a 20–25-mile wide strip of land with the Euphrates River to the east and Lake Razazah to the west. This strip of land was recognized by Iraqi commanders as a key approach to Baghdad, and was defended by the Medina and Bakhtnisar Divisions of the Iraqi Republican Guard. American forces attacked Iraqi forces in the area with massive air attacks followed by concentrated armored thrusts which resulted in the Iraqi units being surrounded and annihilated.

== Initial moves ==
On the night of March 19, 2003, US Army Special Forces Operational Detachment Alpha 551 (ODA 551) from the 5th Special Forces Group was infiltrated via three MH-47Es accompanied by MH-60L DAP (Direct Action Penetrators) into an area 100 km from the Karbala Gap to provide eyes-on surveillance of the Gap, the mission became the longest in Green Beret history. ODA 551 drove in their GMVs to the Gap where they set up observation posts and began their surveillance mission; at this time the Gap only contained a small Iraqi Army garrison and the local Fedayeen. Their mission ended on March 30.

The Iraqi high command had originally positioned two Republican Guard divisions blocking the Karbala Gap. Here these forces suffered heavy Coalition air attacks. However, the Coalition had since the beginning of March been conducting a strategic deception operation to convince the Iraqis that the US 4th Infantry Division would be mounting a major assault into northern Iraq from Turkey. This deception plan worked, and on 2 April Saddam's son Qusay Hussein declared that the American invasion from the south was a feint and ordered troops to be re-deployed from the Karbala front to the north of Baghdad. Lt. Gen. Raad al-Hamdani, who was in command of the Karbala region, protested this and argued that unless reinforcements were rushed to the Karbala gap immediately to prevent a breach, the fate of Baghdad would be determined within 48 hours. His suggestions fell on deaf ears.

Meanwhile, American troops were pushing through the gap and reached the Euphrates River at the town of Musayib. An expected Iraqi chemical attack did not materialize. At Musayib, American troops crossed the Euphrates in boats and seized the vital al-Kaed bridge (Objective Peach) across the Euphrates after Iraqi demolitions teams had failed to destroy it in time. In response, Lt. Gen. Hamdani was ordered to launch an immediate counterattack. Hamdani later said that his units were not in condition to launch an immediate counterattack and that he counseled to establish a defensive line along the Usfiyah River in order to contain the American breakthrough. Nevertheless, Hamdani's forces launched a counterattack on the night of 2–3 April.

== Iraqi counterattacks, 2–3 April ==
The 10th Armored Brigade from the Medina Division and the 22nd Armored Brigade from the Nebuchadnezzar Division, supported by artillery, launched night attacks against the American bridgehead at Musayib. The attack was savagely repulsed using tank fire and massed artillery rockets, destroying or disabling every Iraqi tank in the assault. The next morning, Coalition aircraft and helicopters counterattacked the Republican Guard units, destroying many more vehicles as well as communications infrastructure. The Republican Guard units broke under the massed firepower and lost any sense of command and cohesion. By the end of the day, the tanks of the 3rd ID had overrun Lt. Gen. Hamdani's headquarters and Hamdani and his staff fled. American forces lost no men killed to Iraqi fire in this action while Iraqi losses are estimated at 230 to 300 killed. Nevertheless, the Iraqi counterattacks had caused enough confusion and Captain Edward Korn was reported killed on 3 April in the Karbala Gap by friendly fire.

== Destruction of the Medina Division ==
While the fight around Musayib was raging on 3 April, other elements of the US Army's 3rd Infantry Division had captured Baghdad International Airport. Before pushing deeper into Baghdad, US commanders decided to mop up the remnants of the Republican Guard Medina Division which were still present south of Baghdad. The intention was to catch the Medina Division from behind, while they were engaging other units to their front. The 2nd Brigade of the 3rd ID under Col. David Perkins was dispatched to the southwest towards Objective Saints, the codename for the intersection between highways 1 and 8. The interchange was defended by dismounted infantry, and during the fight for Objective Saints one US soldier was wounded and an M1 Abrams tank was disabled by an RPG round (it was later repaired).

After capturing Objective Saints on the 3rd, the 2nd Brigade pushed south and made contact with the remnants of the 10th and 2nd Brigades of the Medina Division. Despite reports that 80% of the division's vehicles had been destroyed, the Iraqis had moved their vehicles away from their prepared defenses and hidden them near buildings and in palm groves, sparing many of them from air attack. Hundreds of Iraqi tanks, IFVs and artillery were still present.

The American tanks tore into the Iraqi vehicles, destroying many of them at point blank range. Despite the survival of many of their vehicles, the Iraqi defense was un-coordinated and many troops put on civilian clothes and deserted during the fight, leaving their uniforms on the battlefield. The Medina Division ceased to exist as an effective fighting force.

== Aftermath ==
The Battle of the Karbala Gap was a one-sided engagement in which the 3rd Infantry Division wiped out the best units in the Republican Guard while suffering minimal losses. The destruction of these elite units left the door to Baghdad open for the 3rd ID, and the next day Col. Perkins led the first "Thunder Run", an armored strike through southern Baghdad. Baghdad fell within days. However, four days later, the Republican Guard scored a direct hit on the Third Infantry Division, Second Brigade's Tactical Operations Center, with an Al-Samoud variant rocket, estimate 280 kg payload warhead, killing three soldiers, two foreign reporters, wounding 14 additional soldiers, and destroying 22 vehicles, mostly unarmored Humvees.

== Bibliography ==
- Conroy, Jason (2006). Heavy Metal: A Tank Company's Battle to Baghdad. Potomac Books. ISBN 978-1574888577.
- Lacey, Jim (2007). Takedown: The 3rd Infantry Division's Twenty-One Day Assault on Baghdad. Naval Institute Press. ISBN 978-1591144588.
- Zucchino, David (2004). Thunder Run: The Armored Strike to Capture Baghdad. Grove Press. ISBN 978-0802141798.
