= 2nd Al Medina Armored Division =

Al-Medina Armoured Republican Guard Division
- Al Medina Division insignia
- Active: 1980s – 2003
- Country: Iraq
- Allegiance: Ba'athist Iraq
- Branch: Iraqi Republican Guard
- Type: Armoured Division
- Size: ≈10,000 (2003)
- Equipment: T-72 tanks (Asad Babil)
- Engagements: Iran–Iraq War: Second Battle of al-Faw; Tawakalna ala Allah Operations; Persian Gulf War: Battle of Medina Ridge; 1991 uprisings in Iraq: Siege of Karbala; 2003 Invasion of Iraq: Raid on Karbala; Battle of the Karbala Gap; Battle of Al Kut

Commanders
- Commander: Riyadh Husayn Ali al-Nasiri al-Tikriti

The 'Al-Medina' Armored Division (Arabic: المدينة المنورة الفرقة المدرعة, "Medina the Luminous") was an elite formation of the Iraqi Republican Guard.

== History ==
=== Iran–Iraq War ===
During the course of the Iran–Iraq War, the division ballooned from Division to Corps size. The unit saw deployment during the Second Battle of al-Faw under the command of Major General Hussein al-Rashid, who was later promoted to the Chief of the General Staff in 1991.

=== Gulf War ===
The division's most famous engagement came during the Battle of Medina Ridge; the largest tank battle of the Gulf War and the largest tank battle in American history. Despite lacking air support the division put up a surprisingly strong resistance, helping pause the Coalition advance and ultimately serving as one of the contributory factors for the halt order given by President George H. W. Bush on 28 February 1991.

=== 2003 invasion of Iraq ===
During the 2003 invasion of Iraq, the division was mostly deployed along the Karbala gap, the territory between Karbala and Hillah. The division was targeted by Coalition forces early in the war during the raid on Karbala due to its perceived status as one of Iraq's best divisions, with the division being equipped with artillery and 270 T-72 tanks, the most advanced tanks used by Iraqi forces. In the raid on Karbala, the division won what was considered to be the only Iraqi victory of the invasion.

The division, which was deployed 50 miles south of Baghdad, straddled a heavily fortified area known as the "Red Zone." The division dispersed and embedded itself around Karbala, placing units close to homes, schools, mosques and the region's many ancient Shia shrines. Medina Division forces were also one of the units believed to have been readying for using chemical weapons during the invasion. It was claimed at the time that General Tommy Franks intended to make an example of the Medina Division, hoping that the destruction of the division would shatter Iraqi morale.

In the ensuing Battle of Kut, the division put up a surprisingly light resistance, with many Republican Guard forces choosing instead to desert.
