= Battle of Kut =

Battle of Kut may refer to:

- Siege of Kut (1915–1916) during World War I
- Second Battle of Kut (1917) during World War I
- Battle of Kut (2003) during the Iraq War
- Battle of Kut (2004) during the Iraq War
