= Battle of Phase Line Bullet =

1991 battle in the Persian Gulf War

Coordinates: 29°53′34″N 46°52′23″E

- Part of the Persian Gulf War
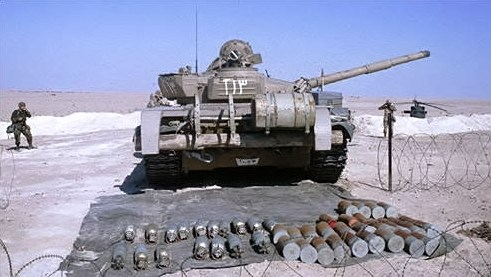
- Iraqi T-72 Asad Babil tank abandoned to advancing 3AD forces
Date	26 February 1991
Location	Southern Iraq
Result	Iraqi victory

Belligerents
United States	Iraq

Commanders and leaders
Norman Schwarzkopf; Frederick M. Franks, Jr. Paul E. Funk	Saddam Hussein; Iyad Futayyih

Strength
3rd Armored Division; 2nd Armored Cavalry Regiment; 7th Cavalry Regiment	Tawakalna Republican Guard Division

Casualties and losses
2 killed 12 wounded 4 IFVs destroyed 10 IFVs damaged	At least 1 T-72 destroyed 3+ APCs destroyed

The Battle of Phase Line Bullet was one of a series of engagements that led to the destruction of the Tawakalna Iraqi Republican Guard Division, on 26 February 1991, by a simultaneous attack of the 1st and 3rd armored divisions, the 1st Infantry Division, and the 2nd Armored Cavalry Regiment (2ACR) during the Persian Gulf War.

The 3rd Armored Division advanced to the west through a corridor between the 1st Armored Division in the north and the 2ACR in the south. The Bradley squadron that spearheaded the assault was beaten back by a screen of Iraqi entrenched infantry, APCs, and Iraqi T-72 tanks. The incident also involved American friendly fire casualties caused by M1 Abrams tanks operating in the rearguard. The action forced to halt the offensive of the 3rd Armored Division until dawn. The Iraqi troops were eventually dislodged from their positions by close air support and artillery fire during the early hours of 27 February.

== Background ==
The initial skirmishes between American and Iraqi Republican Guard units took place earlier that day around the grid reference line 73 Easting, some 30 miles west of Wadi al Batin, where the 2ACR managed to destroy two Iraqi armored brigades. The skirmishes in this sector were still going on when the 3rd Armored Division (3AD) positioned north, made the first contact with a brigade of the Tawakalna Armored Division around 03:30 pm. The scouts of the division made contact with the Iraqi army just after they crossed the grid reference line Phase Line Bullet.

Weather conditions were extremely poor, hampering identification of targets and preventing the use of helicopters in reconnaissance missions.

== Battle ==
=== Flank screen maneuver ===
As the usual practice for armored reconnaissance, a troop of M3 Bradleys (Alpha Troop), belonging to the 4th Squadron of the 7th Cavalry Regiment, along with an attached platoon of Armored Personnel Carriers, belonging to 2nd Platoon Charlie Company, of the 23rd Combat Engineer Battalion, was scouting ahead of the main tank force. The flank screen maneuver occurred along the southern boundaries between the 2ACR and the 3AD operational areas. Task Forces 4-34 and 4-32 were advancing from the rear. The general movement of the US forces followed an eastward direction. The fumes from hundreds of oil wells set on fire by the Iraqis, combined with an intense shamal, forced the US vehicles to use thermal sights.

=== Sudden contact and retreat ===
At 03:00pm, the reconnaissance troop of 14 Bradleys received information from the GHQ of the 3rd Armored Division that no enemy unit remained between them and the Kuwaiti border. Suddenly, they found a screen line of Iraqi APCs straight ahead, barely 600 metres (660 yd) to the east. The poor weather and burning oil fumes reduced the visibility conditions.

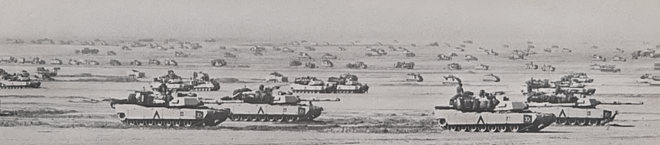
Tanks from 3rd Armored Division Brigade along the Line of Departure

A burst of small arms and heavy machine gunfire, RPG-7s and Sagger anti-tank missiles erupted. Initially, the American commander thought they were engaging dismounted infantry supported by BMP-1s, he later realized that they were also receiving main-gun tank rounds. The US vehicles retaliated by firing TOW missiles, 25 mm cannon and machine guns. The contact lasted about two hours until the Bradleys, battered by the enemy and friendly fire and running out of ammunition, were forced to withdraw to the west.

American M1 Abrams tanks from TF 4-34, positioned in the rear echelon, fired in support of the IFVs, destroying at least one T-72 and several Iraqi APCs. They also hit three Bradleys (A-24, A-31 and A-22), causing two American deaths. The 2ACR also became entangled in the fighting from the rear right.

Another Bradley (A-36) was first disabled by a 12.7 mm round from an NSVT heavy machine gun which penetrated the transmission and later shattered by a large caliber, shaped charge impact in the turret's front. Bradley A-35 also took some damage from a mix of ricocheting 12.7 mm bursts and indirect fire, but was able to drive out, while A-33 suffered two injured and its radio station was hit by 12.7 mm fire. During the rescue of casualties from A-24, Bradley A-26, commanded by Sergeant Major Ronald Sneed, was near-missed by two T-72 main rounds, which spattered the vehicle with splinters. While providing cover for A-21 who was attempting to assess the situation with A-36, Bradley A-22, commanded by Staff Sergeant Meyers, was struck in the turret by an M-1 tank from TF 4-34, killing one of the crew.

Sergeant (SGT) Gentry, the gunner of the A-24, was also killed by tank fire from friendly US forces. A-24 Bradley Commander, Sergeant First Class (SFC) Raymond Egan, and A-24 observer Specialist Dale were also wounded. This incident occurred while a close-by machine gun position was firing on the A-24 at the same time that SFC Egan spotted an enemy armored vehicle to their front at 350 yards. The armored vehicle, a BMP-1, was rotating its 73mm turret main gun in an attempt to engage the A-24. SFC Egan gave the firing command to SGT Gentry to engage the BMP with their 25mm gun. SGT Gentry responded, “on the way,” but the 25mm gun stopped firing. SFC Egan immediately engaged the battle override switch while instructing his observer, Specialist Dale, to take cover near the driver. These actions would enable SGT Gentry to reengage and launch their TOW missile while their rear hatch was open. SFC Egan then gave the fire command to SGT Gentry to fire the TOW missile. Gentry fired, guiding the missile directly to the target, destroying the BMP-1 just as the BMP-1 was poised to fire on the A-24. Subsequently, aware that firing the TOW may have exposed the A-24’s position, SFC Egan instructed the A-24’s driver, Specialist Sholle, to back up and move away from their firing position. As the driver was back up, A-24 was struck by what was initially assessed as a T-72 SABOT tank round, directly impacting the turret. The tank round penetrated A-24 piercing SGT Gentry’s abdomen while he was positioned in the gunner’s seat, causing him to slump in his seat, severely injuring him. It subsequently pierced SFC Egan’s left leg as he was standing on the Bradley Commander’s seat, attempting to locate additional enemy targets. The tank round also blew the rear ramp down, injuring A-24 observer SPC Dale and driver SPC Sholle.

The tank round, hitting ammunition, ejected SFC Egan from the turret approximately 10–15 feet above A-24, landing him unconscious in the sand. Minutes later, SFC Egan awoke and managed to hobble to the A-24 ramp. While all this was happening, indirect fire and main tank rounds were landing all around A-24. Immediately, A-26’s Bradley Commander SSG Rousey pulled alongside A-24 to protect A-24 from incoming fire while A-26 Bradley Commander, SSG Connette, called for medivac. Squadron Cmd. Sgt. Major Sneed also pulled forward in his Bradley vehicle to block incoming rounds and assist with evacuation. Incoming fire knocked CSM Sneed from his vehicle to the ground, but he still kept assisting with A-24’s crew evacuation.

Moments later, a M-113 medic vehicle arrived on scene and began CPR on SGT Gentry while SPC Sholle attempted to apply a tourniquet to SFC Egan’s leg. It is notable that SGT Gentry bravely fought to survive for almost ten minutes before succumbing to his injuries. The medical SGT who attempted to revive SGT Gentry gave CPR until passing out. Consequently, the medic SGT’s crewman, Private ?, had to assume the track commander position. While lying in a vehicle stretcher, the Private, new to the Army, asked SFC Egan how to return to the aid station. SFC Egan, by now having received several doses of morphine, looked at his wrist compass and instructed the Private to “go that way.” Even though mall compasses located within armored vehicles are ineffective, the medic vehicle eventually arrived to the aid station.

The disabled A-22, A-36 and A-24 were left abandoned on the battleground, while A-31, although heavily damaged by friendly tank fire, was able to pull back. All the surviving Bradleys were raked by machine gun fire and shell splinters, but they remained operational.

== Aftermath ==
American forces could not find a breach in the northern Iraqi lines until the first hours of February 27. The commander of the 3rd Armored Division, General Paul Funk, ordered to stop the assault until daylight. Funk requested air support from 24 Apache helicopters, A-10 aircraft and artillery to deal with the Iraqi positions at night. Later in the morning, 7th Cav scouts found the hulls of 18 APCs and IFVs, mostly BMP-1s, and six T-72s disabled or abandoned by their crews. The commander of Alpha troop, Captain Gerald Davie, acknowledged that his force was "ten times too close to the enemy than we would choose to be."
