= Iraqi Republican Guard =

1969–2003 elite branch of Iraq's military

- حرس العراق الجمهوري
- Republican Guard Forces Command insignia
- Founded: 1969
- Disbanded: April 2003 (de facto); 23 May 2003 (de jure)
- Country: Ba'athist Iraq
- Allegiance: Saddam Hussein
- Branch: (Ba'athist Iraq) Iraqi Armed Forces
- Type: Praetorian Guard; Mechanized infantry Special operations force Republican guard
- Role: Shock troops Special operations Airborne infantry Armoured warfare Urban warfare
- Size: ≈70,000–75,000 (as of 2002)
- Color of beret: Red
- Equipment: T-72M1 tanks Lion of Babylon tanks AK-47; TT-33 Handgun
- Engagements: Iran–Iraq War; First Battle of Khorramshahr; Operation Dezful; Operation Nasr; Operation Ramadan; Operation Before the Dawn; Operation Dawn (1983); Operation Dawn 3; Operation Dawn-4; Operation Dawn 5; Operation Dawn 6; Battle of the Marshes; Operation Badr (1985); First Battle of al-Faw; Battle of Mehran; Siege of Basra; Operation Karbala-7; Operation Karbala-8; Second Battle of Al Faw; Tawakalna ala Allah Operations; Persian Gulf War; Iraqi invasion of Kuwait; Battle of Khafji; Battle of 73 Easting; Battle of Norfolk; Battle of Medina Ridge; Battle of Phase Line Bullet; Battle of Wadi al-Batin; Battle of Rumaila; 1991 Iraqi uprisings; Kurdish Civil War; Iraq War; 2003 invasion of Iraq; Attack on Karbala; Battle of Baghdad

Commanders
- Honorable Supervisor of the Republican Guard: Qusay Hussein
- Secretariat: Kamal Mustafa Abdullah
- Chief of Staff: Saif Al-Din Al-Rawi
- Corps Commanders: Lt. Gen. Majid al-Dulaymi (I Corps Commander); Lt. Gen. Ra'ad al-Hamdani (II Corps Commander)
- Notable commanders: Saddam Hussein; Qusay Hussein; Saddam Kamel

Aircraft flown
- Helicopter: Bell 214ST
- Attack helicopter: Mil Mi-24

Iraqi President Saddam Hussein talks with Republican Guard officers in Baghdad on 1 March 2003, 20 days before the invasion. Iraqi News Agency/AP.

The Iraqi Republican Guard (IRG; Arabic: حرس العراق الجمهوري, romanized: Ḥaras al-ʿIrāq al-Jamhūrīy) was a branch of the Iraqi military from 1969 to 2003, which existed primarily during the presidency of Saddam Hussein. Initially a Praetorian Guard unit tasked with the sole purpose to protect the president of Iraq, it grew exponentially during the Iran-Iraq War, transforming into an elite force of the Iraqi Armed Forces. It later became known as the Republican Guard Corps, and then the Republican Guard Forces Command (RGFC) with its expansion into two corps. The Republican Guard was disbanded in 2003 after the invasion of Iraq by a U.S.-led international coalition.

The Republican Guard were the elite troops of the Iraqi army directly reporting to Hussein, unlike the paramilitary force Fedayeen Saddam, and the regular Iraqi Army. They were better trained, disciplined, equipped, and had higher salaries than ordinary Iraqi soldiers, receiving bonuses, new cars, and subsidized housing.

== Formation ==
The guard was formed in 1969, and was originally created to be a presidential guard. Its primary objective was to maintain the stability of the regime and provide protection against internal and external enemies. During the Iran–Iraq War, it was expanded into a large military force. Following the invasion of Iraq by a U.S.-led international coalition, the Coalition Provisional Authority took control of the Iraqi government in 2003. The same year, an order was passed by the CPA which dissolved the republican guard.

The force's last commander was Qusay Hussein, the younger son of Saddam Hussein. Saddam Hussein was so confident about the capability of the guard that he had said: "In history when they write about Napoleon's Guard, they will arrange them next to the Republican Guard of Iraq."

Because of their elite status Republican Guards received better equipment and uniforms than their regular Army counterparts, and could often be identified by distinctive markings or items of head dress. Members of the regular Republican Guards conventionally wore a scarlet-colored triangle insignia on both shoulders of their uniforms (sometimes backed with white material to form a white border around the edge of the triangle); they also wore black berets as did some Army personnel, but as a distinctive marking a scarlet ribbon was often sewn to the right of the National cap badge to distinguish bravery in combat and/or loyalty to the Hussein regime. The Special Republican Guards wore a maroon beret with the national eagle device, and a special variation of the triangle shoulder insignia in maroon with green Arabic lettering. The bright red qardoon (shoulder cord) distinguished Republican Guards as well. A similar cord with green and red bands was also worn by the Special Republican Guards.

== Operational history ==
=== Iran–Iraq War ===
Initially, the Guard had limited capabilities; however, during the Iran–Iraq War, it was expanded to five brigades, which was initially mostly used in counterattacks, notably in Operation Before the Dawn, Operation Dawn-4, and Operation Badr (1985). By 1986, the war had exhausted Iraq, with both Iran and Iraq suffering heavy casualties. Iran had by then captured the Al Faw Peninsula and gradually pushed Iraqi forces beyond the pre-war border and captured territory inside Iraq, repulsing counterattacks by the Republican Guard. This, coupled with another defeat at the Battle of Mehran, caused the Iraqi Ba'ath Party to convene the Ba'ath Extraordinary Congress of July 1986. During this Congress, the Ba'ath Party decided on a new strategy to overhaul the Iraqi military and use Iraq's manpower capability. This decision allowed for the drafting of thousands of collegiate Iraqis, who were sent to military summer camps and whose schools were subsequently closed.

With this massive influx of manpower, the Republican Guard expanded to somewhere between 28 and 33 brigades which were led by loyal officers drawn from the Iraqi military. This force then conducted the Tawakalna ala Allah Operations, leading to the eviction of the Iranians from occupied Iraqi territory, resulting in the liberation of Al-Faw, as well as allowing for renewed major offensives into Iran.

==== 1980–1988 Order of Battle ====
The order of battle according to Iranian sources was as follows:

- 1st Mechanized Brigade
- 2nd, 10th Armored Brigades
- 3rd Special Forces Brigade
- 4th, 5th, 6th, 7th, 8th, 16th, 17th Infantry Brigades (sometimes as mechanized units)
- 11th Commando Brigade

There are some claims of units with names that are unknown.

=== Persian Gulf War ===
Between the Iraqi invasion of Kuwait and the Persian Gulf War ("Operation Desert Storm"), the number of Republican Guard formations was expanded and the Guard was reorganized. The Republican Guard Forces Command was also created during this period. At the beginning of the Persian Gulf War, it consisted of the following units:

- Republican Guard, CO Lieutenant General Iyad Futayyih Khalifah al-Rawi
  - 1st Republican Guard Corps, deployed in southern Iraq and northern Kuwait, consisted of:
    - 1st Hammurabi Armoured Division, CO Major General Qais Abd al-Razaq.
    - 2nd al-Medinah al-Munawera Armoured Division
    - 3rd Tawakalna ala-Allah Mechanised Division
    - 4th Al Faw Motorized Infantry Division
  - 2nd Republican Guard Corps deployed south of Baghdad consisted of:
    - 5th Baghdad Mechanised Division, a square division of four brigades, was able to be split into two small half-divisions
    - 6th Nebuchadnezzar Motorized Infantry Division
    - 7th Adnan Motorized Infantry Division (Note: Named after a cousin of Saddam Hussein)

Deployed outside of the corps structure were various other units including:

- 8th As Saiqa Special Forces Division – contained a marine brigade, a parachute brigade, and a special forces brigade. The marine brigade was deployed on Kuwait's nine islands, all but Failaka Island, are uninhabited. The brigade was headquartered on Bubiyan Island.

The Republican Guard also included two Corps Headquarters, the Allah Akbar Republican Guard Operations Command, and the Fat'h al-Mubayyin Republican Guard Operations Command, separate artillery detachments and numerous field support units.

Between the invasion of Kuwait and the start of the war on 17 January 1991, four more RGFC internal security divisions had been formed which remained behind in Iraq. Three of them, the Al-Abed ('The Worshiper'), Al-Mustafa ('The Elect') and Al-Quds ('Jerusalem') Divisions were motorized, and the Al Nida ('The Call') Armored Division was considered one of the most elite formations of the RGFC. They may have conducted operations against Kurdish forces in the north.

=== Invasion of Kuwait ===
The insignia of the anti-aircraft unit of the Republican Guard.

By 1 August 1990, there were more than 100,000 Iraqi troops with up to 700 tanks on the Kuwaiti border.

On 2 August 1990, the Republican Guard units commenced the invasion of Kuwait, which lasted two days. The Kuwait army strength was 16,000, so on paper Iraqi forces outnumbered the Kuwaitis 7 to 1. However, the actual ratio was far worse; the initial attack was swift, swift enough for the Kuwaiti military personnel on leave to be unable to report on time.

The attack was conducted by eight RGFC divisions (two armoured, two mechanized, three motorised infantry and one special forces). The main thrust was conducted from the north down the main Iraq-Kuwait road, later famous as the Highway of Death, by the 1st Hammurabi Armoured Division, with the Nebuchadnezzar Infantry division following; the Tawakalna Mechanised and Al Faw Infantry Divisions advanced on the flanks. The supporting attack from the west was led by the Medina Armoured Division, followed by the Adnan Infantry Division and the Baghdad Mechanised Division. Commandos deployed by helicopters joined the attack on Kuwait City.

After the invasion, the Republican Guard was withdrawn and redeployed into strategic reserve positions in northern Kuwait and southern and central Iraq.

=== Desert Storm ===
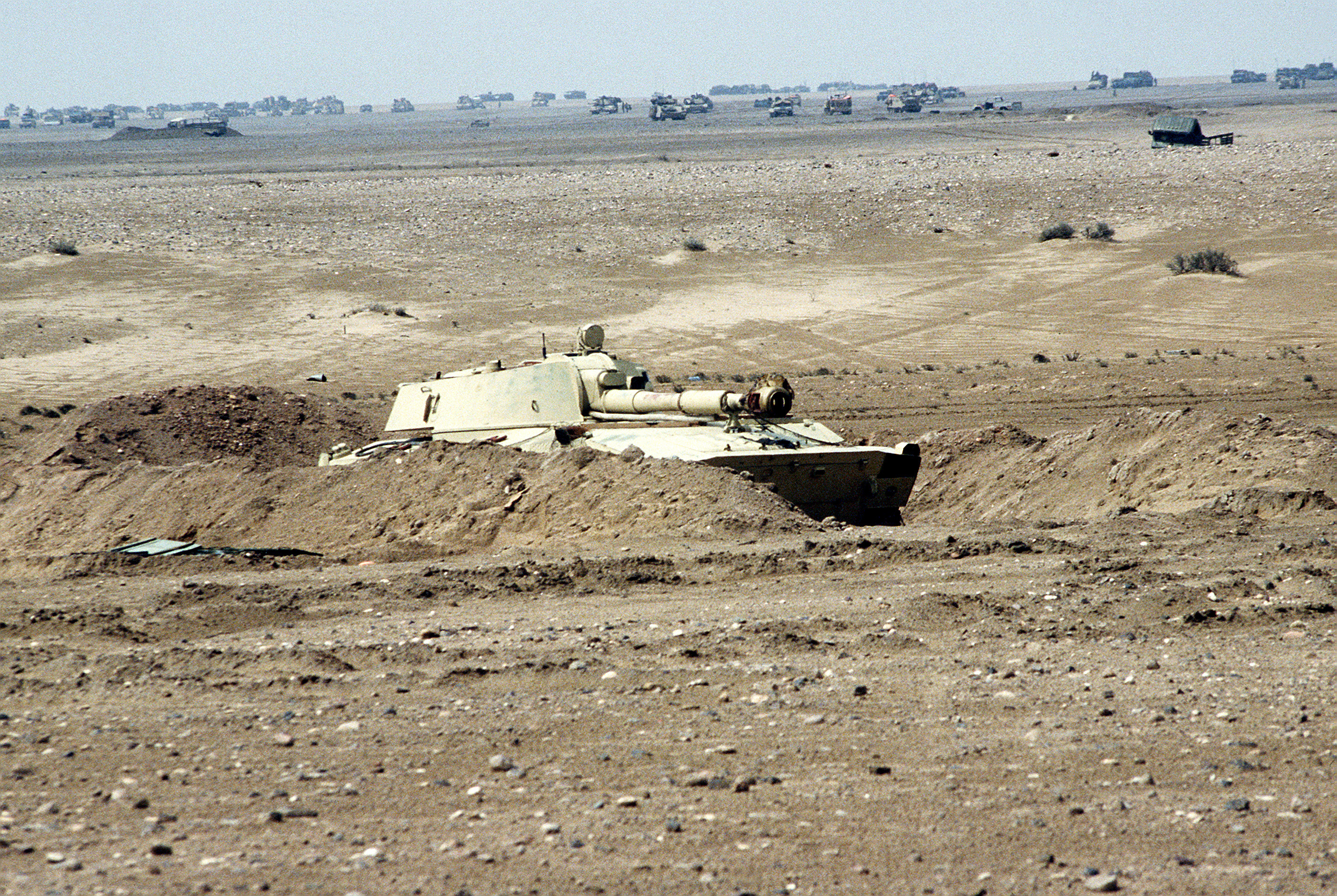
A dug-in 2S1 Gvozdika 122mm self-propelled howitzer of the Iraqi Republican Guard abandoned during Operation Desert Storm, 28 February 1991.

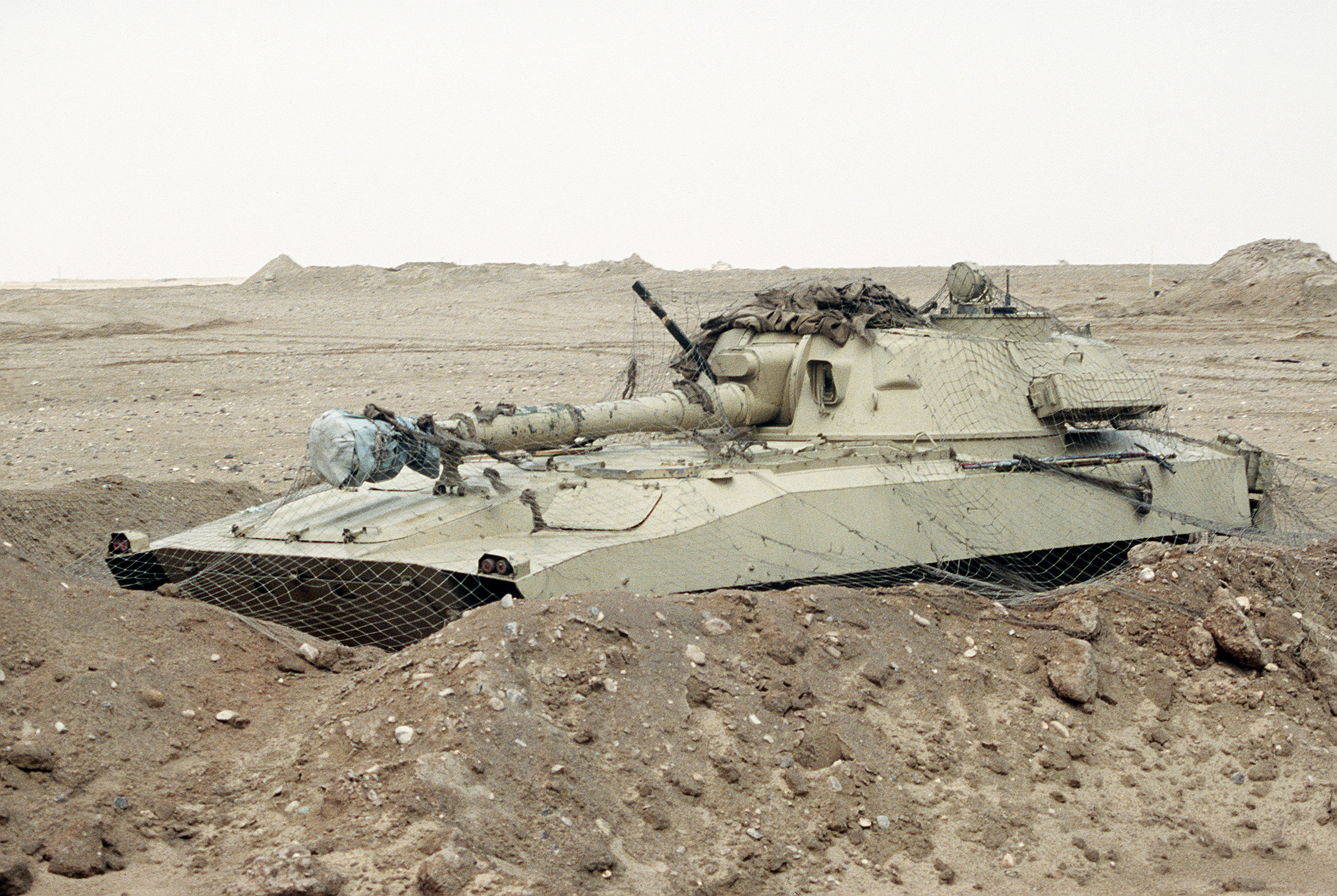
Close-up of the same vehicle.

During the Persian Gulf War, the U.S. VII Corps assembled in full strength and launched an armoured attack into Iraq early Sunday, 24 February 1991, just to the west of Kuwait, taking Iraqi forces by surprise. Prior to the ground offensive, the Iraqi Republican Guard had been attacked relentlessly by US warplanes but managed to shoot down and damage a number of the attackers. On 15 February, the Iraqi Republican Guard shot down two A-10 Warthogs and damaged another, which alarmed USAF General Chuck Horner, who was forced to call off further A-10 attacks on these divisions. Simultaneously, the U.S. XVIII Airborne Corps launched a sweeping "left-hook" attack across the largely undefended desert of southern Iraq, led by the 3rd Armored Cavalry Regiment and the 24th Infantry Division (Mechanized). Once the allies had penetrated deep into Iraqi territory, they turned eastward, launching a flank attack against the Republican Guard.

Both sides exchanged fire, but the Republican Guard divisions, worn down by weeks of aerial bombardment, proved unable to withstand the Allied advance. The Republican Guard participated in some of the largest tank battles in US history including the Battle of Medina Ridge, Battle of Norfolk, and the Battle of 73 Easting against the U.S. VII Corps. During the latter battle US veterans later reported coming under heavy small-arms fire with bullets bouncing off their vehicles, having been attacked by several dismounted detachments of the Tawakalna Division. Several rifle companies of the Tawakalna Division counterattacked under the cover of darkness, in an attempt to recover lost positions. The US won with minimal losses while inflicting heavy losses on the Iraqi Army, but elements of the Republican Guard divisions were able to withdraw back into Iraq, shooting down three US warplanes and a rescue helicopter in the process.

In early April 1991, Colonel Montgomery Meigs, the commander of the 2nd Brigade of the 1st Armoured Division, paid his respects to his former enemy's Medina Division reporting that, "These guys stayed and fought." The Medina Division shot down an A-10 Thunderbolt II in the fighting for Medina Ridge on 27 February 1991, and other Republican Guard units were responsible for the destruction of a US Marine Corps Harrier, a USAF F-16 and a US Army UH-60 Blackhawk that day.

=== Between the Gulf War and the 2003 Iraq War ===
All the eight Republican Guard divisions involved in fighting during the Gulf War and the "Tawakalna" Division were disbanded due to losses. The remaining formations led the suppression of the 1991 uprisings in northern and southern Iraq – the Kurdish insurgency in the north and the Shi'ite uprising in the east. During these times, there were numerous accusations of the use of chemical weapons, rape and torture. The Hammurabi and Medina divisions surrounded Karbala with tanks and artillery, then shelled the city for one week, killing thousands and destroying entire neighborhoods.

Though it was reduced to a strength of seven or eight divisions, the RGFC was reconstituted, taking equipment from Army heavy divisions. Journalist Sean Boyle wrote a number of articles for Jane's Intelligence Review, including on the Republican Guard, during the 1990s. In September 1997 he wrote that the Northern Corps had four divisions – Adnan Mechanised Division (Headquarters (HQ) Mosul) with the 11, 12, 21 Brigades; Baghdad Infantry Division (HQ Maqloob Maontin, Mosul Governate) 4, 5, 6 Brigades; Al Madina Al Munawara Armoured Division (Al Rashedia Camp/Al Taji Camp) 2, 10, 14, 17 Brigades; and the Al Abed Infantry Division (Khaled Camp, Kirkuk) with the 38, 39, and 40 Brigades. The Southern Corps had three divisions including the Hammurabi Division.

=== 2003 U.S. Invasion ===
See article: Iraq War

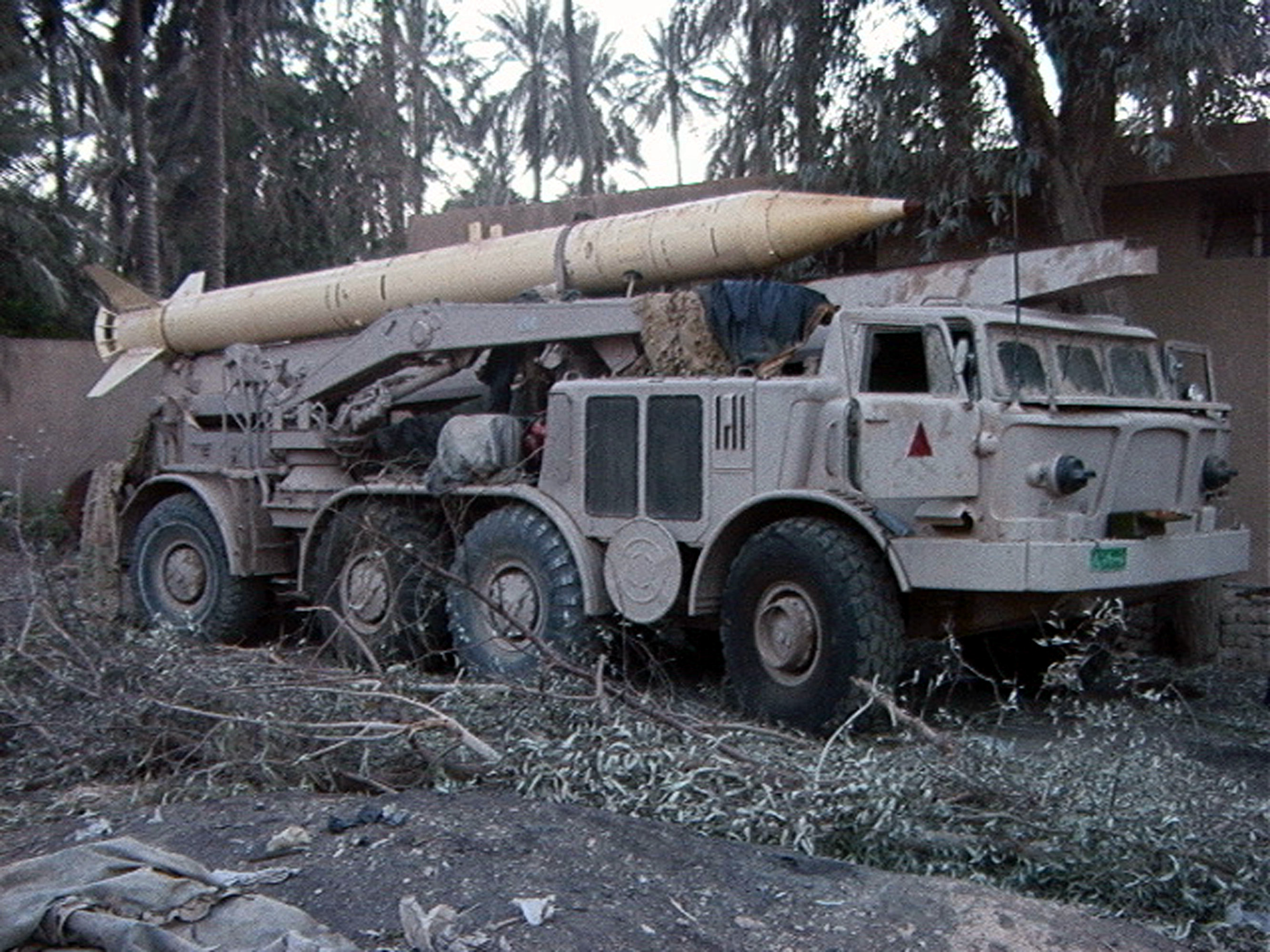
An Iraqi Republican Guard FROG-7 captured by U.S. Marines (2003).

The Republican Guard was subordinate to the "Special Security Apparatus of the State" and not to the Ministry of Defence as was the regular Iraqi Army. It was split into two Corps, one for the defense and control of northern Iraq, called "Allah Akbar Operations Command", composed of infantry and armoured units, and the "Fat'h al-Mubayyin Operations Command" composed primarily of mechanized units, which was located in the southern part of the country. In 2002, it was reported that the Republican Guard and the Fedayeen Saddam were both training for urban warfare and guerrilla warfare.

The Republican Guard then consisted of between 50,000 and 60,000 men (although some sources cite up to 80,000), all volunteers, and some 750 Soviet T-72 and Asad Babil tanks and scores of T-55 and T-62 tanks, along with other mechanized vehicles. A further 90–100 T-72 tanks were operated by the Special Republican Guard. These forces were intentionally placed far from the capital for averting a possible rebellion against the regime. The members of this body of the army were provided with better pay, equipment, and training. They formed a special corps, with the ability to buy houses, while also being given other privileges to ensure loyalty to the regime.

On 23 March 2003, the 2nd Al Medina Armored Division and 6th Nebuchadnezzer Mechanized Division tasked with defending the Karbala Gap fought well, disrupting a strong attack conducted by the 11th Aviation Group ("11th Attack Helicopter Regiment"), damaging thirty Apaches and shooting down one, later capturing the crew consisting of David Williams and Ronald Young, both chief warrant officers. This delayed advances from the Apache unit, as the helicopters were under-repair. At least 2 Apaches of the helicopter regiment were damaged beyond repair. On 2 April 2003, the Iraqi units positioned around Karbala shot down a U.S. Army Sikorsky H-60 Black Hawk helicopter, killing seven soldiers and wounding four. Iraqi forces also shot down an FA-18 Hornet near Karbala around 8.45 AM local time.

On 7 April 2003, an Iraqi Special Republican Guard FROG-7 rocket or an Ababil-100 SSM missile exploded among the parked vehicles of the headquarters of 2nd Brigade, 3rd Infantry Division, killing two soldiers (Private 1st Class Anthony Miller and Staff Sergeant Lincoln Hollinsaid) and two embedded journalists (Julio Parrado and Christian Liebig), wounding 15 and destroying 17 military vehicles.

On 8 April 2003, some 500 Iraqis (including Special Republican Guard) mounted a fierce counterattack across the Jumhuriya Bridge in Baghdad, forcing a part of the U.S. forces on the western side of Baghdad to initially abandon their positions, but the Iraqis reportedly lost 50 soldiers in the fight because of A-10 Warthogs deployed by the USAF. Though, an A-10 attack plane was shot down while combating the counterattack by an Iraqi surface-to-air missile.

==== 2003 Order of Battle ====
- 1st Republican Guard (Southern) Corps
  - 2nd Al Medina Armored Division; 2nd, 10th and 14th Brigades.
  - 5th Baghdad Mechanized Division; including the 4th, 5th, and 6th Motorized Brigades.
  - 7th Adnan Infantry Division; 11th, 12th, 21st, and Divisional Artillery Brigades.
- 2nd Republican Guard (Northern) Corps
  - Al Nida Armored Division; 41st, 42nd, 43rd Brigades.
  - 6th Nebuchadnezzar Mechanized Division; 19th, 22nd and 23rd Brigades.
  - 1st Hammurabi Armoured Division – possibly with Western Desert Force; 8th, 9th Mechanized Brigades, 18th Armored, Division Artillery Brigade.
- As Saiqa Special Forces Division – independent unit containing:
  - Special forces brigade
  - Paratrooper brigade
  - Marine brigade
  - Numerous Commando units

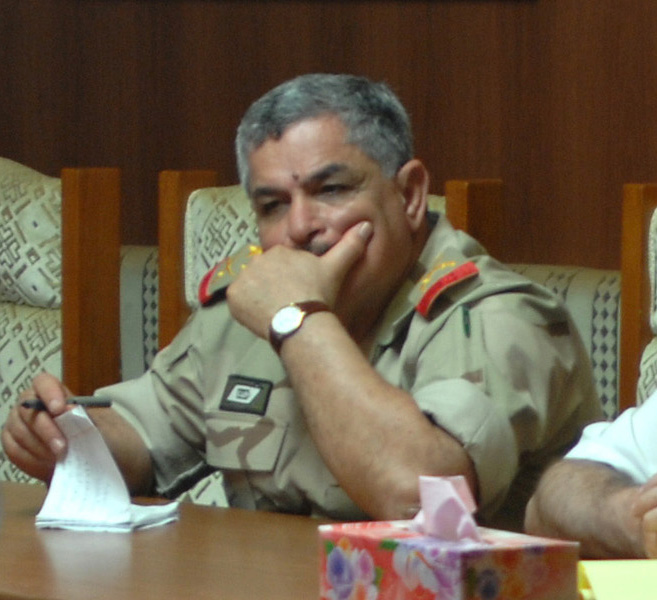
Lt. General Mohan al-Furayji, former Republican Guard officer, as a commander of the new Iraqi Army on 5 August 2008.

On 2 April 2003, U.S. Army Brigadier General Vincent K. Brooks said that the Baghdad Division of the Iraqi Republican Guard had been "destroyed". Iraqi information minister Muhammad Saeed al-Sahhaf responded that this was another U.S. "lie".

The Republican Guard was officially dissolved on 23 May 2003 per Order 2 of the Coalition Provisional Authority under Administrator Paul Bremer.

In early 2004, British journalist Sean Langan confirmed that one of the local commanders of the guerrilla stronghold of Ramadi was a former Republican Guard officer.

In late April 2004, a Pentagon report claimed that members of the Special Republican Guard had regrouped in the guerrilla stronghold of Fallujah.

After dismissal, many members of the Republican Guard went on to join Sunni insurgent groups, including groups such as The Return (al-Awda), Naqshbandi Army (JRTN), Islamic Army in Iraq and the Islamic State.

== See also ==
- Iraqi Special Republican Guard
- Popular Army (Iraq)
- Republican guard
- List of protective service agencies
- Imperial guard
- Royal guard
- Presidential Security Service
- United States Secret Service
