= Battle of Karbala (2003) =

Battle during the 2003 invasion of Iraq

- Part of the invasion phase of the Iraq War
Date	23 March – 6 April 2003 (2 weeks)
Location	Karbala, Iraq
Result	U.S. victory

Belligerents
United States	Iraq

Commanders and leaders
David Petraeus	Ra'ad al-Hamdani; Riyadh Hussein Nayeri; Faiq Abdullah Mikbas; Colonel Hassani Khamis Sarhan

Units involved
3rd Infantry Division; 1st Armored Division; 101st Airborne Division; Charlie Company,1-41st Infantry Regiment; 70th Armor Regiment	Fedayeen Saddam

Casualties and losses
13–21 killed 1 M1 Abrams tank disabled 1 M2A2 Bradley destroyed 1 US Navy F/A-18 shot down by a friendly Patriot battery 1 UH-60 Black Hawk crashed due to disoriention in the darkness	170–260 killed

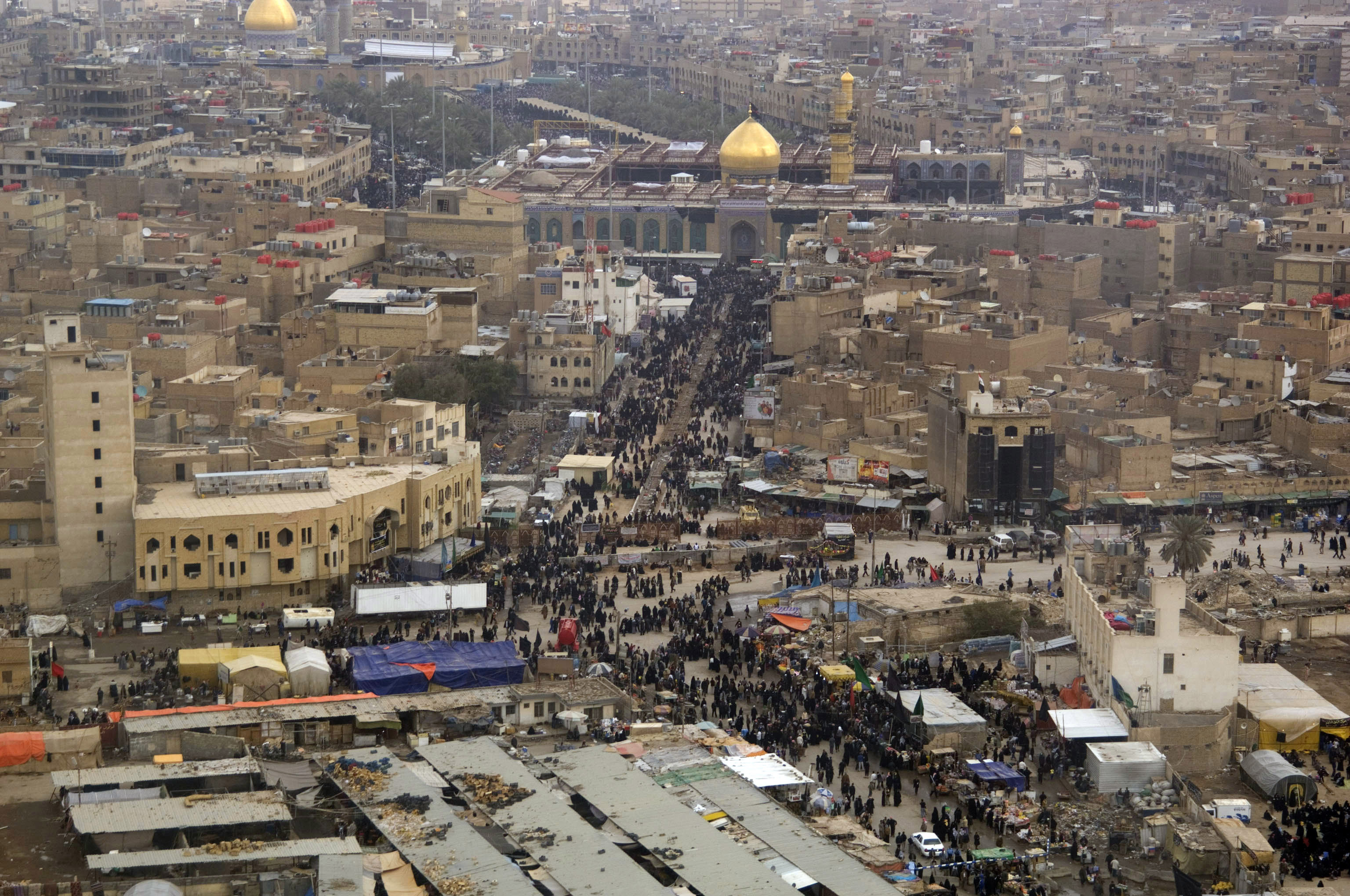
Karbala in 2008

The Battle of Karbala took place during the 2003 invasion of Iraq as U.S. troops fought to take control of the city from Iraqi forces. The city had been bypassed during the advance on Baghdad, leaving American units to clear it in two days of street fighting against Iraqi Saddam Fedayeen Irregular forces.

== Bypassing the city ==
Lead elements of the U.S. 3rd Infantry Division had reached the Karbala area on 31 March. After fighting through Republican Guard forces southeast of the city, these forces bypassed the city and attacked through the Karbala Gap towards Baghdad. The task of clearing the city was left to the 101st Airborne Division, supported by the 2nd Battalion, 70th Armor Regiment with Charlie Company, 1st Battalion, 41st Infantry Regiment, 1st Armored Division. On 2 April, a U.S. Army UH-60 Black Hawk helicopter crashed near Karbala, killing 7 soldiers. Four other soldiers on board were wounded. Though initial reports said the Blackhawk was shot down, the Army later concluded the cause was accidental.

== Capturing Karbala ==
The 101st planned to use helicopter-borne forces to seize three landing zones on the outskirts of the city (codenamed Sparrow, Finch and Robin) and then use an armored force of M1 Abrams tanks and M2 Bradley fighting vehicles to link up with these forces.

At 11:00 a.m. on 5 April, the 101st Airborne began its push to clear Karbala when airstrikes hit several targets around the city. This was followed by a helicopter assault in which 23 UH-60 Blackhawk and 5 CH-47 Chinook helicopters ferried three battalions of infantry from the 502nd Infantry Regiment to their designated landing zones.

3rd Battalion, 502nd Infantry at LZ Sparrow met heavy but disorganized resistance as they moved into the city. To the south, 2/502 at LZ Robin was also moving street by street, and discovered several arms caches hidden in schools. They also discovered a suspected insurgent training camp. By nightfall, 2/502 had cleared 13 of their 30 assigned sectors. 1/502, advancing from LZ Finch in the southeast, captured several weapons caches. Air support from helicopter gunships was used heavily during this operation, and artillery support was also used. Over 100 smoke shells were fired from supporting artillery to screen infantry moving through Karbala's streets. At the same time, 2/70 Armored Regiment and C Co 1/41 IN (Mechanized) had reached Karbala and were engaged in combat, losing 1 man killed from small arms fire and a Bradley to a rocket-propelled grenade hit.

The next day, the units continued to clear their sectors. Resistance evaporated by 5:00 PM on 6 April. At 5:30, a large statue of Saddam Hussein was torn down by members of the 2/70, 1st Armored Division.

For their actions in Karbala, 3rd Battalion, 502nd Infantry, 101st Airborne Division was awarded the Valorous Unit Award.
