= Battle of Medina Ridge =

1991 tank battle of the Gulf War

- Part of the Persian Gulf War
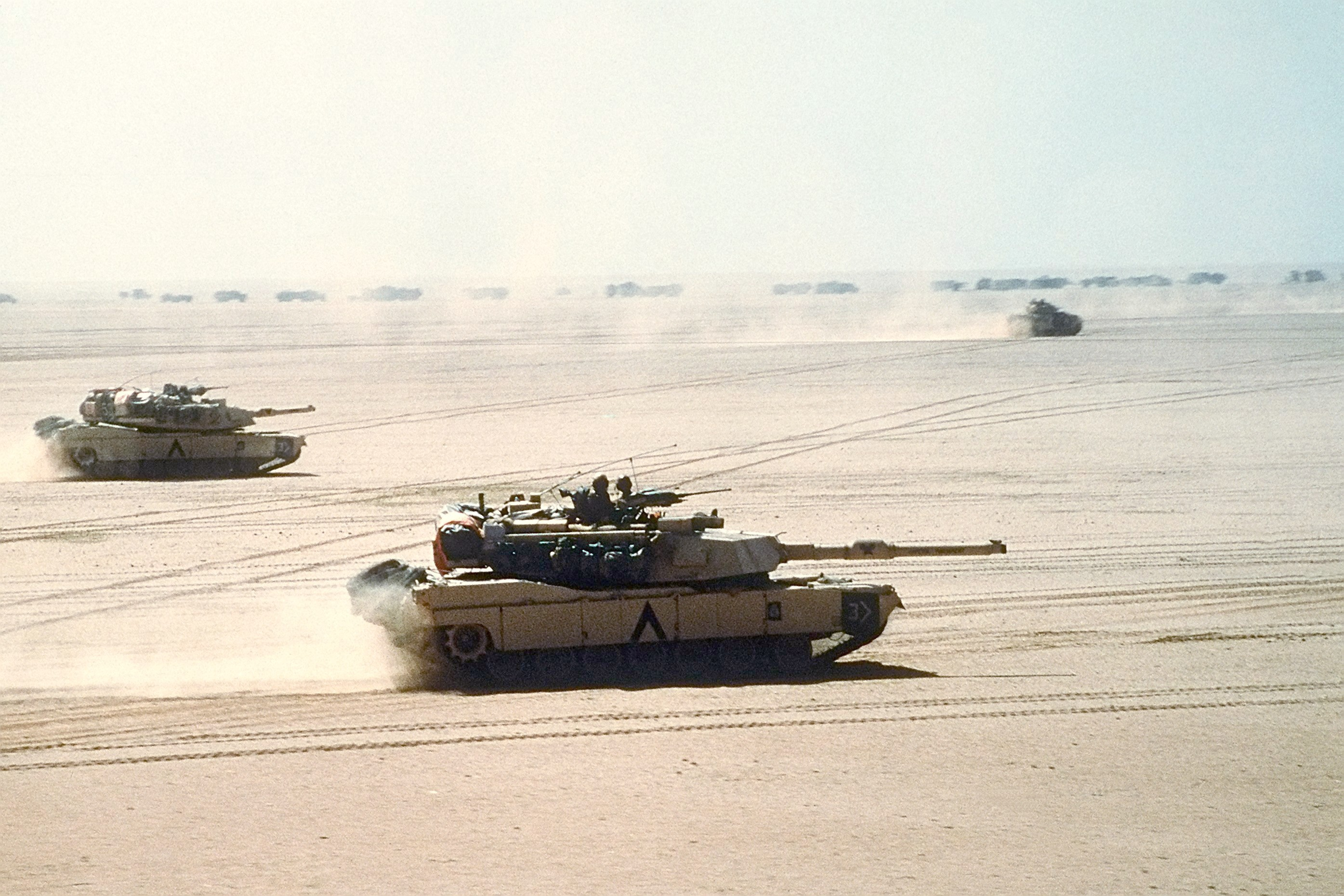
- M1 Abrams tanks moving in formation during the Persian Gulf War
Date	February 27, 1991
Location	Southwest of Basra, Iraq 30°10′27″N 46°56′6″E
Result	American victory

Belligerents
United States	Iraq

Commanders and leaders
Norman Schwarzkopf; Frederick Franks; Ron Griffith; Montgomery Meigs	Ayad Futayyih Al-Rawi

Units involved
1st Armored Division; 3rd Infantry Division: 3rd Brigade Combat Team; 75th Artillery Brigade; Battery B, 25th Field Artillery; 1st Aviation Regiment: 2nd Battalion; 3rd Battalion	Medina Republican Guard Division: 2nd Brigade; Adnan Motorised Division; Tawakalna Republican Guard Division; 52nd Armored Division; 17th Infantry Division; 10th Armored Division 12th Armored Division

Casualties and losses
2 killed 33 wounded 4 tanks destroyed 2 IFVs destroyed 1 ambulance destroyed 1 HEMTT fueler destroyed 2 attack helicopters shot down 4 Humvees destroyed 1 A-10 shot down	839 captured 186 tanks destroyed 127 IFVs destroyed 72 artillery pieces destroyed 118 trucks destroyed 5 air defence systems destroyed

The Battle of Medina Ridge was a tank battle fought on February 27, 1991, during the Gulf War, between the U.S. 1st Armored Division and the 2nd Brigade of the Iraqi Republican Guard's Medina Luminous Division outside Basra, Iraq. The U.S. 3rd Brigade, 3rd Infantry Division, another major contributor, led the attack. Iraq's Motorized Division also participated. Medina Ridge is the name American troops gave to an approximately seven miles (11 km) long low rise.

The battle was fought for over two hours, making it the largest tank battle of the Gulf War. The battle took place west of phase line Kiwi, east of phase line Smash, and north of phase line Grape. Phase lines are map references occurring every few kilometers used to measure progress of an offensive operation.

== History ==
The 1st Armored Division, commanded by Major General Ron Griffith, consisted of some 3,000 vehicles including 348 M1A1 Abrams tanks. The 1st Armored Division's Cavalry Squadron - 1-1 Cavalry - made contact with the Medina Division and informed the division commander of the location of the enemy forces. 1st Armored Division's 2nd Brigade (comprising three battalions TF 4-70th Armor, TF 2-70th Armor and TF 1-35th Armor) saw major action in this battle and was commanded by Colonel Montgomery Cunningham Meigs (a descendant of General Montgomery C. Meigs of Civil War fame). 3rd Brigade, 3rd Infantry Division, commanded by Colonel James Riley, replaced 1st Armored Division's 1st Brigade for the duration of the war and was also heavily involved in the battle. Medina Ridge was one of the few battles during Desert Storm in which American forces encountered significant Iraqi resistance. The Iraqi forces were well fortified and hidden, so that they could not be seen by American forces advancing until after they had finished cleared the top of the ridge line. This reverse slope position was intended to give the Iraqis protection from the powerful long-range direct fire of the M1 Abrams tanks and the M2 Bradley Infantry Fighting Vehicles (IFVs).

During the battle, the American forces destroyed 186 Iraqi tanks (mostly T-72Ms, Asad Babil and obsolete Type 69s) and 127 other armored vehicles. Only four Abrams tanks were directly hit in the battle. Evidence suggests that some of them were hit by Iraqi T-72 fire. Ballistics reports have further confirmed this as well as physical evidence such as obvious sabot holes. Out of the four Abrams that were struck, one was a catastrophic loss and other three were disabled but repairable. Thirty-eight of the Iraqi tanks were destroyed by US air support formed of U.S. Army AH-64 Apaches and U.S. Air Force A-10 Thunderbolt IIs. The 75th Field Artillery Brigade and Battery B, 25th Field Artillery, the division's target acquisition battery, conducted counter-artillery fire missions and destroyed two Medina Field Artillery battalions in the process. The 2nd Battalion, 1st Field Artillery Regiment also eventually participated in these counter-battery missions. On February 25, the 3rd Brigade, 3rd Infantry Division conducted a 113 km movement to destroy elements of the 26th Infantry Division, resulting in the capture of 299 prisoners of war (POWs). On February 26, the 3rd Brigade was ordered to attack east to gain contact with and destroy the Iraqi Republican Guard Forces Command (RGFC) in zone. The 3rd Brigade began an aggressive movement which covered 74 km in 12 hours, while fighting multiple engagements throughout the day and night with elements of the 52nd Armored Division, 17th, Adnan, and Tawakalna Divisions. During one engagement with the Tawakalna Division, the brigade destroyed 27 Soviet export model T-72 tanks which had established a hasty defense to cover the Iraqi forces withdrawing from the Kuwaiti Theater of Operation.

As the heaviest armor brigade, consisting of the 6th Battalion, 6th Infantry; the 1st Battalion, 35th Armor; the 2nd Battalion, 70th Armor; the 4th Battalion, 70th Armor; the 2nd Battalion, 1st Field Artillery and the 47th Support Battalion (Forward), the 2nd Brigade, 1st Armored Division acted as the lead brigade during combat operations. On February 27, the 2nd Brigade was fully engaged with the Medina's 2nd Brigade and, in the largest single engagement of the war, destroyed 61 Iraqi T-72 and T-55 tanks, 34 APCs and five SA-13 air defense systems in less than an hour.

On February 27, the 3rd Brigade, 3rd Infantry Division was ordered to transition to pursuit operations to establish contact with and destroy the RGFC forces in the area. As the brigade attacked and fought through the Adnan Division, securing a RGFC major logistics base, it captured 465 POWs and made contact with the Medina Armored Division, which was augmented by elements of four other Iraqi divisions. The battle ended in the destruction of 82 tanks, 31 armored personnel carriers, 11 artillery pieces, 48 trucks, 3 anti-aircraft guns and the capture of 72 POWs for the loss of 2 Bradley Cavalry vehicles, 1 Killed In Action (KIA), and 30 soldiers Wounded In Action (WIA). The American soldier killed was Specialist Clarence A. (“Johnny”) Cash, a scout assigned to 4th Battalion, 66th Armor Regiment, 3rd Infantry Division.

While conducting offensive operations against the Iraqi Republican Guard Forces Command, the 3rd Brigade, 1st Armored Division fought on the division's right flank as it led the VII Corps main attack against the RGFC. Completing the destruction of the RGFC Brigade, the 3rd Brigade rejoined the division & transitioned to pursuit operations and continued its attack eastward. Executing an aggressive and continuous movement, the 3rd Brigade fought numerous engagements, such as making contact with a tank battalion defending the western flank of a major RGFC logistics base. The 3rd Brigade raced eastward at a rate of 15 kilometers per hour. In 24 hours of nearly continuous combat, the 3rd Brigade destroyed or captured 547 vehicles, including 102 tanks, 81 armored personnel carriers, 34 artillery pieces, 15 AAA guns, and captured hundreds of tons of supplies and 528 POWs. The 3rd Brigade completed this exemplary action without the loss of a single soldier or vehicle and only three soldiers Wounded In Action (WIA).

1st Armored Division's aviation assets conducted thirty-nine straight hours of continuous combat operations, rotating companies into and out of the battle prior to and after the actions at Medina Ridge. Attack helicopters maintained a steady destructive presence in front of the division, engaging targets of opportunity and shifting their focus as the scenario required. The brigade's final battle commenced when the division raced to clear its zone of advance to the Kuwaiti border prior to the impending cease-fire.

Although the Iraqis used a correct defensive tactic at Medina Ridge by deploying their armor behind the ridge, this was not effectively repeated through the rest of the war. In one incident, an Iraqi commander attempted to repeat what had been done at Medina but mistakenly deployed his division too far from the ridgeline. This gave the US units the upper hand, as the Abrams tanks specialize in long-distance kills; their Chobham armor is extremely resistant to long-range fire. The American height advantage also reduced the effective range of the Iraqi tanks and presented the Iraqi gunners with a targeting situation for which they were under-trained. Despite their lack of training for such circumstances, Iraqis shot down an A-10 Thunderbolt II, and two AH-64 Apache helicopters. Most of the units belonging to the 1st Armored Division and the 3rd Brigade, 3rd Infantry Division were awarded Valorous Unit Award citations.

In early April 1991, Colonel Montgomery Meigs, the commander of the 2nd Brigade of the 1st Armored Division, paid his respects to his former enemy's Medina Division reporting that, "These guys stayed and fought". The same newspaper articles notes that, "The Americans had more than 100 battle tanks on hand, about the same as the total number of tanks in the Iraqi force. But the Americans had some noteworthy advantages over the Iraqis like attack helicopters and A-10 anti-tanks planes. The Iraqis had no support aircraft."

== Task Force 1-37 ==
In a short six-month period during 1990 and 1991, the 1st Battalion, 37th Armor, was alerted for deployment to Operation Desert Shield/Desert Storm, deployed all of its personnel and equipment over 3,000 miles (4,800 km) from an already forward deployed location, fought a major battle against a well equipped enemy over terrain they had never trained on and then redeployed the unit to its home station.

The 1st Battalion 37th Armor (1st Armored Division) from Rose Barracks, Vilseck, Germany, commanded by LTC Edward L. Dyer, was alerted for deployment to the Persian Gulf on November 8, 1990. 1–37 Armor was the first brigade unit from Vilseck to deploy. 1–37 Armor was attached to the 3rd "Bulldog" Brigade from Warner Barracks in Bamberg, Germany, under their former commander, Colonel Daniel Zannini. A small advance party deployed on 14 December and the main body began departing on December 26. By December 30, the main body of the battalion had arrived in Saudi Arabia. Vehicles and equipment which had been shipped from ports in Europe began to arrive on January 4 and by January 12 all the equipment had arrived. When hostilities commenced on January 15, 1991, the battalion was in the process of closing the last elements into TAA Thompson. The next month was spent task organizing, training, rehearsing, and preparing for the ground war.

On February 24, Task Force 1–37, part of 3rd Brigade, 1st Armored Division, crossed the line of departure as part of VII Corps' attack against Iraqi forces. On February 25, the battalion attacked and seized the division headquarters of the Iraqi 26th Infantry Division destroying four Armored Fighting Vehicles (AFV's), eight air defense weapons, and captured over forty Enemy Prisoners of War (EPW's). After attacking all day on February 26, Task Force 1–37 made contact with a brigade of the Tawakalna Armored Division of the Republican Guard Forces Command (RGFC), which had established a defensive position to protect the flank of the RGFC and facilitate their escape from Kuwait. After a thirty-minute fire fight, Task Force 1–37 was ordered to assault the enemy position. The assault, conducted at night in driving rain, resulted in the destruction of twenty-six T-72 tanks, 47 Armored Personnel Carriers (APC's) and Infantry Fighting Vehicles (mostly BMP's) and a handful of other vehicles, as well as the capture of over one hundred EPW's. TF 1–37 suffered the loss of four M1A1 tanks destroyed and six personnel WIA. After consolidation and reorganization, the task force continued the attack throughout the night of February 26–27, reestablishing contact with the RGFC at approximately 0530 (5:30 AM), February 27. The task force continued to attack, fighting numerous engagements with elements of multiple Iraqi divisions throughout the 27th and into the morning of the 28th. At 0800 (8 AM) local time, February 28, the task force established a hasty defensive position astride the Iraq-Kuwait border. During the last 28 hours of the attack, Task Force 1–37 destroyed an additional thirty-one tanks, thirty-one BMP's, numerous other APC's, air defense weapons, and trucks, and captured over 200 EPW's. Four days after the cease fire, Task Force 1–37 moved nine miles (14 km) further into Kuwait. Two missions were conducted to destroy additional enemy weapons, ammunition and equipment, bury enemy remains, and to recover the four M1A1's which had been destroyed on February 26.

On March 24, Task Force 1–37 moved back into Iraq and established a defensive position in the vicinity of the Rumayilah oil fields. For the next three weeks, task force missions centered on refugee assistance and security operations. On April 10, Task Force 1–37 began movement to the Rear Assembly Area (RAA) in the vicinity of King Khalid Military City (KKMC), Saudi Arabia. By April 13, the task force had closed into the RAA and preparations began for the redeployment of the unit to Germany.

On August 16, 1991, the 1st Brigade, 1st Armored Division was re-designated as the 3rd Brigade, 3rd Infantry Division.

== Unit citations ==
=== 2nd Brigade, 1st Armored Division Valorous Unit Award Citation ===
Headquarters and Headquarters Company, 2nd Brigade, 1st Armored Division distinguished itself by gallantry in action from February 26 - 28th, 1991, while conducting offensive operations against the Iraqi Republican Guard Forces Command during Operation Desert Storm. As the heaviest Armor Brigade, consisting of the 6th Battalion, 6th Infantry; the 1st Battalion, 35th Armor; the 2nd Battalion, 70th Armor; the 4th Battalion, 70th Armor; the 2nd Battalion, 1st Field Artillery and the 47th Support Battalion (Forward), the 2nd Brigade led the first Division in the largest tank battle against the Iraqi Republican Guard Forces Command.

==== 2nd Brigade, 1st Armored Division Units Cited ====
- HHC, 2nd Brigade, 1st Armored Division
- 6th Battalion, 6th Infantry
- 1st Battalion, 35th Armor
- 2nd Battalion, 70th Armor
- 2nd Battalion, 1st Field Artillery
- 47th Support Battalion
- 4th Battalion, 70th Armor

=== 3rd Brigade, 1st Armored Division Valorous Unit Award Citation ===
Headquarters and Headquarters 3rd Brigade, 1st Armored division distinguished itself by gallantry in action from February 24 - 28th, 1991, while conducting offensive operations against the Iraqi Guard Forces Command (RGFC) during Operation Desert Storm. The brigade fought on the division's right flank as it led the VII Corps main attack against the RGFC. Completing the destruction of the RGFC Brigade, the 3rd Brigade rejoined the division transitioned to pursuit operations and continued its attack eastward. Executing an aggressive and continuous movement, the 3rd Brigade fought numerous engagements. The brigade made contact with a tank battalion defending the western flank of a RGFC's major logistics base. Attacking with all three battalions on line, the enemy vaporized in front of the brigade, ten armored vehicles destroyed in the first minute of the battle. The brigade's relentless attack continued throughout the day and into the night as it raced eastward at a rate of 15 kilometers per hour. In 24 hours of nearly continuous combat, the brigade destroyed or captured 547 vehicles, including 102 tanks, 81 armored personnel carriers, 34 artillery pieces, 15 AAA guns, and captured hundreds of tons of supplies and 528 Enemy Prisoners of War (EPW's). The brigade completed this action without the loss of a single soldier or vehicle and only three Wounded In Action (WIA's).

==== 3rd Brigade, 1st Armored Division Units Cited ====
- HHC, 3rd Brigade, 1st Armored Division
- 1st Battalion, 37th Armor
- 3rd Battalion, 35th Armor
- 7th Battalion, 6th Infantry
- 3rd Battalion, 1st Field Artillery
- 125th Support Battalion

=== 3rd Brigade, 3rd Infantry Division Valorous Unit Award Citation ===
For exceptionally meritorious service as the Advanced Guard Brigade of the 1st Armored Division during offensive operations against the Iraqi Republican Guard Forces Command (RGFC) during Operation Desert Storm from February 24 - 28th 1991. As an attached Brigade consisting of 1/7th Infantry, 4/7th Infantry, 4/66th Armor, 1/1st Cavalry, 2/41st Field Artillery, 16th Engineer Battalion, and 26th Forward Support Battalion, the 3rd Brigade led the 1st Armored Division and VII Corps main attack against the RGFC. On February 25, the brigade conducted a 113 km movement to contact to destroy elements of the 26th Infantry Division, resulting in the capture of 299 enemy prisoners of war (EPW's). On February 26, the brigade was ordered to attack east to gain contact with and destroy the RGFC in zone. The 3rd Brigade began an aggressive and continuous movement to contact which covered 74 kilometers in 12 hours, while fighting multiple engagements throughout the day and night with elements of the 52nd, 17th, Adnan, and Tawakalna Divisions. During one engagement with the Tawakalna Division, the brigade destroyed Soviet T-72's, which had established a hasty defense to cover the Iraqi forces withdrawing from the Kuwaiti Theater of Operation. On February 27, the 3rd Brigade was ordered to transition to pursuit operations to establish contact with and destroy the RGFC forces in zone. As the brigade attacked and fought through the Adnan Division, securing a RGFC major logistics base, it captured 465 EPW's, and made contact with the Medina Armored Division, which was augmented by elements of four other Iraqi divisions. A destructive battle ensued culminating in the destruction of 82 tanks, 31 armored personnel carriers, 11 artillery pieces, 48 trucks, 3 AAA guns and captured 72 EPW's with the loss of only 2 Bradley Cavalry vehicles, 30 WIA's, and 1 KIA.

=== Aviation Brigade, 1st Armored Division Valorous Unit Award Citation ===
Headquarters and Headquarters Company, Aviation Brigade, 1st Armored Division distinguished itself by gallantry in action against an armed enemy during Operation Desert Storm February 23 - 28th, 1991. The brigade conducted combat operations to ascertain enemy dispositions along the division's zone of advance. The brigade's aircraft conducted continuous flight operations as the division's movement to contact accelerated into Iraq. Time and again the attack helicopters were employed against Iraqi armored elements forward of the division's ground forces. The brigade conducted thirty-nine straight hours of continuous combat operations, rotating companies into and out of the battle. Because of their integration into the division's close fight, the destruction of the Medina and Adnan Divisions was assured. Attack helicopters maintained a steady destructive presence in front of the division, engaging targets of opportunity and rapidly shifting their focus and combat power as the scenario required. The brigade's final battle commenced when the division raced to clear its zone of advance to the Kuwaiti border prior to the impending cease-fire. The brigade completed its combat operations without suffering the loss of any aircraft, vehicles or personnel.

=== Aviation Brigade, 1st Armored Division Units Cited ===
- HHC, Aviation Brigade, 1st Armored Division
- 2nd Battalion, 1st Aviation
- 3rd Battalion, 1st Aviation
- Company I, 1st Aviation

== Historical significance ==
The Battle of Medina Ridge is recognized as the largest tank battle of the Gulf War by some sources. Other sources put it second behind the Battle of Norfolk.
