= Battle of Kut (2003) =

Iraq War battle

- Part of the 2003 invasion of Iraq
Date	April 3–4, 2003
Location	Kut, Iraq
Result	U.S. victory

Belligerents
United States	Iraq

Commanders and leaders
(United States) Col. Joe W. Dowdy	(Iraq) Saleh Hammadi Salmani (Iraq) Mohammad Ibrahim Sulaiman

Units involved
Part of the 1st Marine Division	Numerous elements of the Medina division and the Baghdad Division

Strength
Unspecified	2,500-3,000 men

Casualties and losses
1 Marine killed ~12 wounded At least 1 ACE truck destroyed	Many T-62 tanks, APC's, and Mk83's destroyed At least 150–250 killed and nearly a thousand wounded 2,000–2,500 captured

The Battle of Kut was an armed confrontation between elements of the United States military and Iraqi forces during the 2003 invasion of Iraq.

Before the 2003 invasion, Kut was home to an Iraqi airfield and suspected chemical weapons plant, thus making it an important target during the invasion. Kut lay in the way of the planned Coalition advance to Baghdad.

== Battle ==
On April 3, 2003, the 1st Marine Division reached the outskirts of Kut, and broadcast a warning to the Iraqi defenders there, ordering them to surrender by 0700 GMT. The deadline passed with no response, and the US launched their assault on Kut.

On April 3, several US military units advanced into Kut, meeting little resistance until they closed in within 1,000 yards of their objectives. At that point, Iraqi soldiers and irregulars opened fire with small arms and RPGs. Fearing a close-quartered urban battle, the US forces remained on the outskirts of the city, returning fire and killing many defenders. Numerous air strikes, including a B-52 strike, were launched on the Iraqi defenses. Numerous GBU-16 bombs were dropped from US warplanes, destroying many Iraqi T-62 tanks, BMPs, and support vehicles.

On the ground, American soldiers were briefly pinned down by gunfire from an Iraqi bunker, where numerous Iraqi infantry had gathered. The gunfire was answered by numerous tank rounds and heavy machine gun fire, and after four hours the bunker's defenders had been killed, injured, or captured. One US Marine, Corporal Mark Evnin, was killed during the battle when he was mortally wounded by Iraqi machine gun fire.

In a last attempt to drive off the attackers, Iraqi soldiers attempted to charge the American tanks with small arms and machine guns, but were cut down by American tank fire, and the 1st Marine Division advanced into Kut. After capturing the city and its bridges, Kut was effectively under US control. Several militants of the Fedayeen Saddam continued to hold out within isolated pockets in the city, but no major Iraqi forces now opposed the American drive into Baghdad.

American losses during the battle numbered at least 1 dead, about a dozen wounded, and 1 ACE truck destroyed. Iraqi losses are unclear, but were described as "heavy", with at least 150–250 killed and nearly a thousand wounded.
