= Tommy Franks =

American general (born 1945)

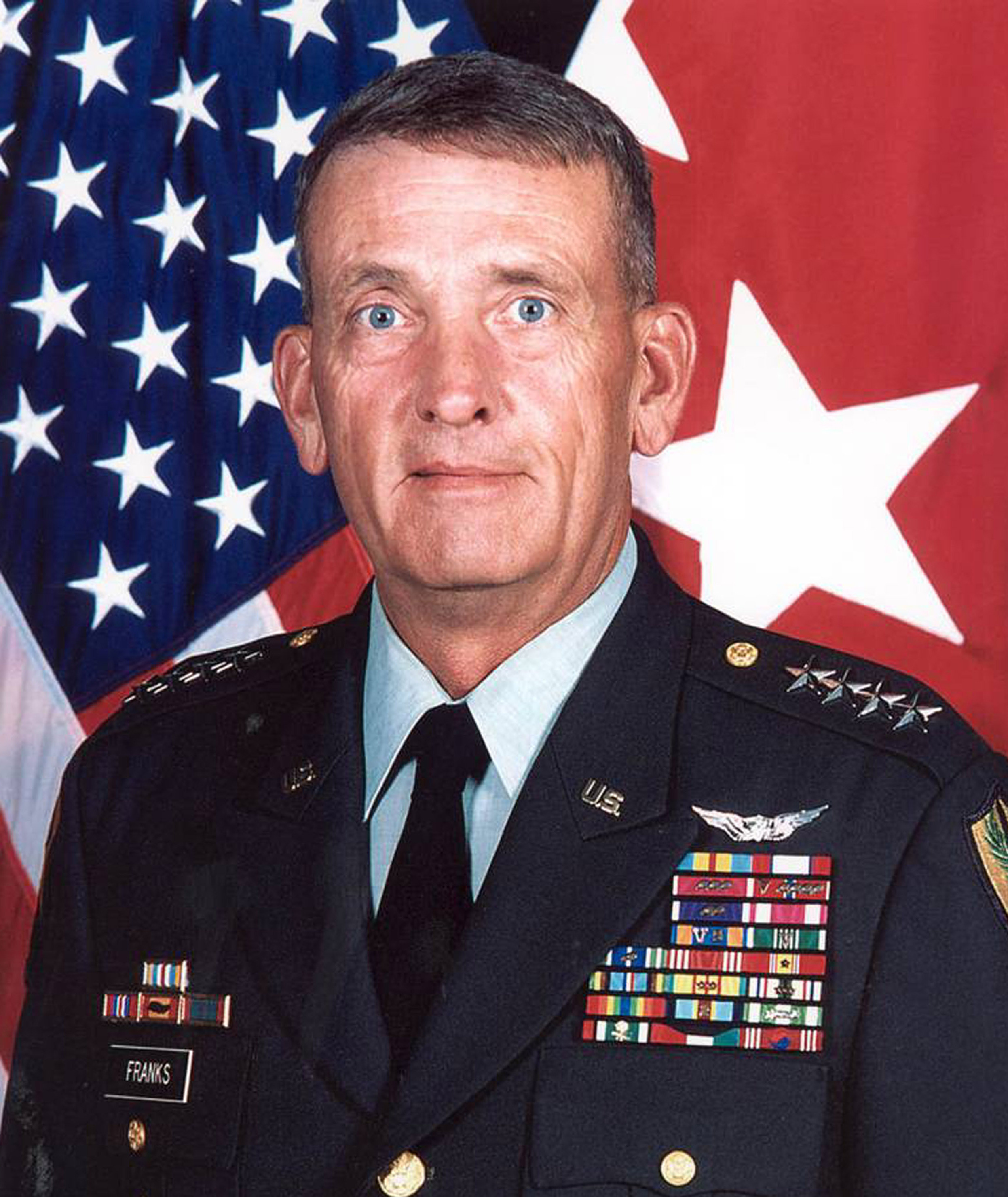
- Official portrait, 2000
- Born: Tommy Ray Bentley; 17 June 1945 (age 81); Wynnewood, Oklahoma, U.S.
- Alma mater: University of Texas at Arlington
- Spouse: Cathryn Carley (m. 1969)
- Military career
- Allegiance: United States
- Branch: United States Army
- Service years: 1965–2003
- Rank: General
- Commands: United States Central Command; Third United States Army; 2nd Infantry Division; 82nd Field Artillery Regiment; 2nd Battalion, 78th Field Artillery
- Conflicts: See list: Vietnam War; Gulf War; War in Afghanistan; Operation Crescent Wind; Fall of Mazar-i-Sharif; Siege of Kunduz; Fall of Kabul; Herat Uprising; Fall of Kandahar; Battle of Qala-i-Jangi; Battle of Tora Bora; Iraq War; Karbala Attack (2003); Battle of Baghdad
- Awards: Defense Distinguished Service Medal (3); Army Distinguished Service Medal (2); Legion of Merit (3); Bronze Star Medal (5); Purple Heart (3); Presidential Medal of Freedom; Knight Commander of the Order of the British Empire (United Kingdom)

Tommy Ray Franks (born 17 June 1945) is a retired United States Army general. His last army post was as the Commander of the United States Central Command, overseeing United States military operations in a 25-country region, including the Middle East. Franks succeeded General Anthony Zinni to this position on 6 July 2000 and served until his retirement on 7 July 2003. Franks was the United States general leading the attack on the Taliban in Afghanistan in response to the September 11 attacks on the United States in 2001. He also oversaw the 2003 invasion of Iraq and the overthrow of Saddam Hussein.

== Early life and education ==
Franks was born Tommy Ray Bentley in Wynnewood, Oklahoma, and was adopted by Ray and Lorene "Pete" Parker Franks. Franks attended Midland High School and graduated from Robert E. Lee High School in Midland, Texas one year ahead of First Lady Laura Bush. He attended the University of Texas at Austin, where he was a brother of Delta Upsilon International Fraternity. He dropped out of college after two years due to subpar grades and lack of motivation. Franks decided to give himself a "jolt" and joined the United States Army.

Later, through the military, Franks was able to enroll at the University of Texas at Arlington, where he graduated with a Bachelor of Business Administration degree in 1971. He also holds a Master of Science in Public Administration from the Shippensburg University of Pennsylvania and is a graduate of the Armed Forces Staff College and the Army War College.

== Military career ==
Franks enlisted in the United States Army in 1965 and attended Basic Training at Fort Leonard Wood, Missouri and received his Advanced Individual Training as a cryptologic analyst at Fort Devens, Massachusetts. Standing out among his peers in outstanding marksmanship and leadership qualities, Private First Class Franks was selected to attend the Artillery and Missile Officer Candidate School, Fort Sill, Oklahoma and was commissioned a second lieutenant in February 1967. After an initial tour as a battery Assistant Executive Officer at Fort Sill, he was assigned to the 9th Infantry Division in Vietnam, where he served as forward observer, aerial observer, and Assistant S-3 with 2nd Battalion, 4th Field Artillery. He also served as Fire Direction Officer and Fire Support Officer with 5th Battalion (mechanized), 60th Infantry during this tour.

In 1968, Franks returned to Fort Sill, where he commanded a cannon battery in the Artillery Training Center. In 1969, he was selected to participate in the Army's "Boot Strap Degree Completion Program", and subsequently attended the University of Texas at Arlington, where he finished his bachelor's degree in 1971. Following attendance at the Artillery Officer Advanced Course, he was assigned to the 2nd Armored Cavalry Regiment in West Germany in 1973, where he commanded the 1st Squadron Howitzer Battery and served as Squadron S-3. He also commanded the 84th Armored Engineer Company, and served as Regimental Assistant S-3 during this tour.

Franks, after graduating from the Armed Forces Staff College, was posted to The Pentagon in 1976, where he served as an Army Inspector General in the Investigations Division. In 1977 he was assigned to the Office of the Chief of Staff, Army where he served on the Congressional Activities Team, and subsequently as an Executive Assistant.

In 1981, Franks returned to West Germany where he commanded the 2nd Battalion, 78th Field Artillery (1st Armored Division) for three years. He returned to the United States in 1984 to attend the Army War College at Carlisle, Pennsylvania, where he also completed graduate studies at the Shippensburg University of Pennsylvania. He was next assigned to Fort Hood, Texas, as III Corps Deputy Assistant G3, a position he held until 1987 when he assumed command of 1st Cavalry Division Artillery. He also served as Chief of Staff, 1st Cavalry Division during this tour.

Franks's initial general officer assignment was Assistant Division Commander (Maneuver), 1st Cavalry Division during Operation Desert Shield and Operation Desert Storm. During 1991–1992, he was assigned as Assistant Commandant of the Field Artillery School at Fort Sill. In 1992, he was assigned to Fort Monroe, Virginia as the first Director, Louisiana Maneuvers Task Force, Office of Chief of Staff of the Army, a position held until 1994 when he was reassigned to South Korea as the CJG3 of Combined Forces Command and United States Forces Korea.

From 1995 to 1997, Franks commanded the 2nd Infantry Division, Korea. He assumed command of Third United States Army/Army Forces Central Command in Atlanta, Georgia in May 1997, a post he held until June 2000 when he was selected for promotion to general and assignment as Commander in Chief, United States Central Command. Franks was the United States general leading the 2001 invasion of Afghanistan and the overthrow of the Taliban in government in response to the September 11 attacks. He also led the 2003 invasion of Iraq and the overthrow of Saddam Hussein.

Critics of Franks's tenure as commander of United States forces in Afghanistan cite his failure to deploy 800 United States Army Rangers to the Battle of Tora Bora as a key factor in allowing Osama bin Laden to escape into Pakistan. Peter Bergen, a prominent journalist and expert on Osama bin Laden and al-Qaeda, described Franks's decision as "one of the greatest military blunders in recent US history," which allowed al-Qaeda to recover and begin to mount an insurgency. Franks defended his decision with the support of other prominent US military leaders, citing a lack of conclusive evidence that bin-Laden was at Tora Bora, but Bergen and other critics, including the Delta Force commander at Tora Bora, Dalton Fury, claimed that the evidence that bin-Laden was present at the battle was very robust; Fury claimed that his team came within 2,000 meters of bin Laden's suspected position, but withdrew because of uncertainty over the number of al-Qaeda fighters guarding bin Laden and a lack of support from allied Afghan troops.

Franks's retirement was announced on 22 May 2003. Secretary Donald Rumsfeld reportedly offered him the position of Chief of Staff of the United States Army, but he declined. On 7 July 2003 Franks's retirement took effect.

Franks's awards include the Defense Distinguished Service Medal; Army Distinguished Service Medal (two awards); Legion of Merit (four awards); Bronze Star Medal with Valor device and four oak leaf clusters; Purple Heart (two oak leaf clusters); Air Medal with Valor Device; Army Commendation Medal with Valor Device; and a number of U.S. and foreign service awards. He wears the Army Staff Identification Badge and the Aircraft Crewmember's Badge. He is an Honorary Knight Commander of the Order of the British Empire. In 2004, President George W. Bush awarded him the Presidential Medal of Freedom

=== Iraq War ===
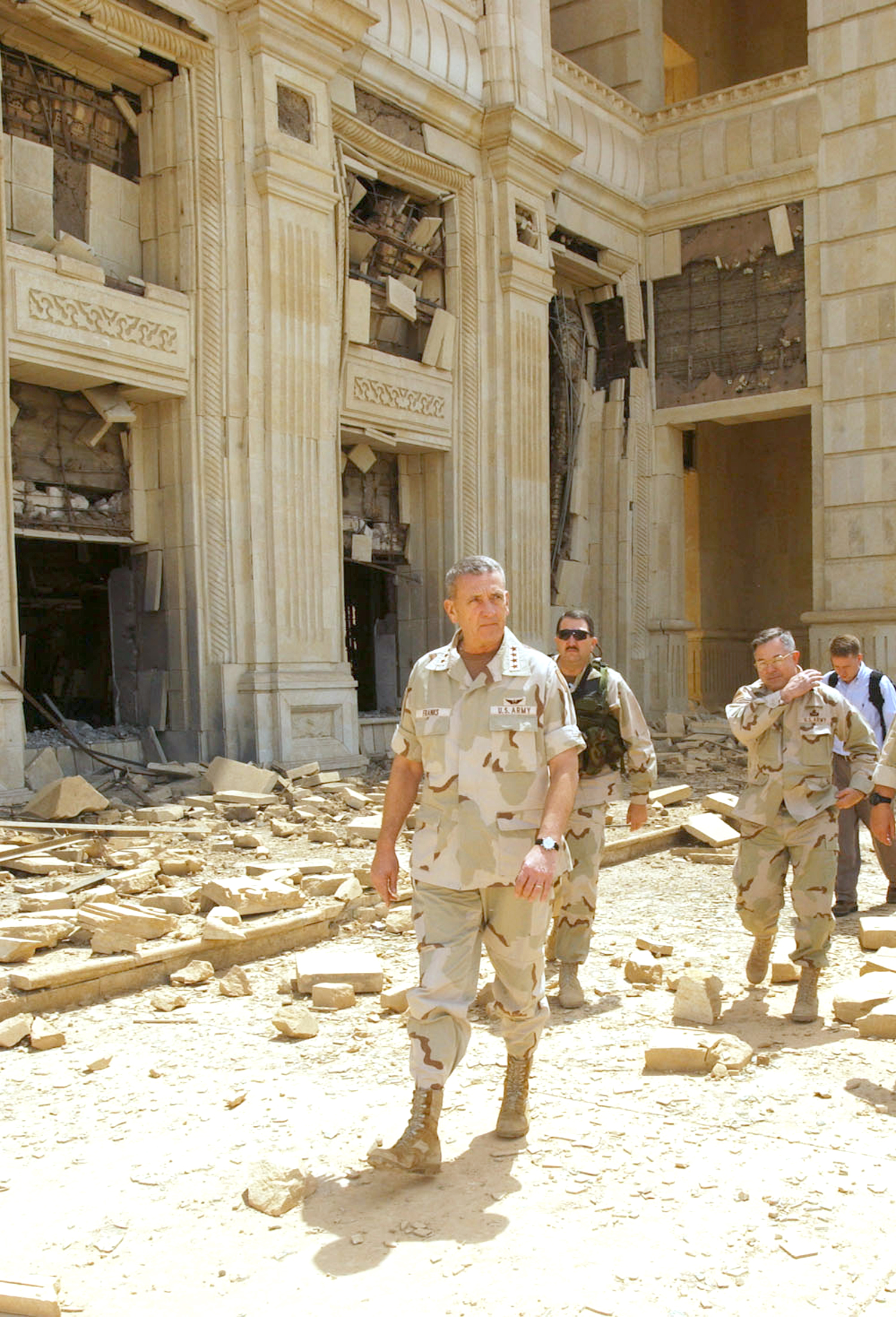
Gen. Franks touring the ruins of one of Saddam Hussein's palaces in April 2003

Authors suggest that Franks was worn down by repeated pressure from U.S. Defense Secretary Donald Rumsfeld to reduce the number of U.S. troops in war plans and cancel the deployment of the 1st Cavalry Division, a scheduled follow-on unit that was slated for deployment in April 2003. More generally, they argue Franks's command was somewhat understandably focused on the immediate task in front of it – defeating Saddam Hussein and taking Baghdad – and few were willing to divert resources away from that effort and toward the long-term post-war needs.

The writers also question his decision during the war to keep sealift ships carrying the equipment for the 4th Infantry Division (Mechanized) at sea instead of bringing the equipment ashore in Kuwait sooner so the division could have entered Iraq earlier than it did to add to the force levels in post-war Iraq. Franks argues that by keeping the ships at sea the Iraqis were deceived into believing a U.S. attack was yet to come from the north through Turkey, though Colin Powell and others have questioned his view.

Franks wanted to retire after the major combat phase of the war, tired from planning and prosecuting two major wars and leading the overall war on terrorism since September 2001. As a result, Gordon and Trainor argue he was slow to act during the crucial months following the fall of Baghdad. They suggest there was a leadership void at U.S. Central Command because his two deputies, Michael Delong and John Abizaid, were at odds with each other until Abizaid succeeded Franks in the middle of the summer of 2003. Delong retired with a bitter taste in his mouth and wrote his own book regarding the leadership failures in the headquarters. They also note that there was a command transition in Iraq as V Corps and General Ricardo Sanchez took command of U.S. forces in Iraq without being fully resourced and trained for the mission in advance.

In Fiasco: The American Military Adventure in Iraq, veteran defense and Pentagon reporter Thomas E. Ricks echoes criticism from officers who had served under Franks who put forth that, while tactically sound, he lacked the strategic mindset and overall intellect necessary for the task. Some close to him argued he was more thoughtful than he seemed, was aware that Secretary Rumsfeld and his staff were unable to discuss the Iraq War in military terms and had an obligation to put forth stronger objections to the civilian control of military planning. While demanding and goal oriented he was also criticized for being unwilling to countenance alternate viewpoints and for detaching himself from day-to-day affairs when the ground war ceased and he prepared for retirement.

==== Weapons of mass destruction ====
According to Time magazine, on 21 November 2003, Franks said that in the event of another terrorist attack, American constitutional liberties might be discarded by popular demand in favor of a military state. Discussing the hypothetical dangers posed to the US in the wake of the 9/11 attacks, Franks said that "the worst thing that could happen" is if terrorists acquire and then use a biological, chemical or nuclear weapon that inflicts heavy casualties. If that happens, Franks said, "... the Western world, the free world, loses what it cherishes most, and that is freedom and liberty we've seen for a couple of hundred years in this grand experiment that we call democracy." Franks then offered "in a practical sense" what he thinks would happen in the aftermath of such an attack.

"It means the potential of a weapon of mass destruction and a terrorist, massive, casualty-producing event somewhere in the Western world – it may be in the United States of America – that causes our population to question our own Constitution and to begin to militarize our country in order to avoid a repeat of another mass, casualty-producing event. Which in fact, then begins to unravel the fabric of our Constitution."

"[No] one in this country probably was more surprised than I when weapons of mass destruction were not used against our troops as they moved toward Baghdad," said Franks on 2 December 2005.

==== Service summary ====
Dates of rank

| Insignia | Rank | Date |
|---|---|---|
| | Private second class | 1965 |
| | Second Lieutenant | 1967 |
| | First Lieutenant | 1968 |
| | Captain | 1969 |
| | Major | 1978 |
| | Lieutenant Colonel | 1982 |
| | Colonel | 1987 |
| | Brigadier General | 1991 |
| | Major General | 1994 |
| | Lieutenant General | 1997 |
| | General | 2000 |

Awards and decorations

Left breast

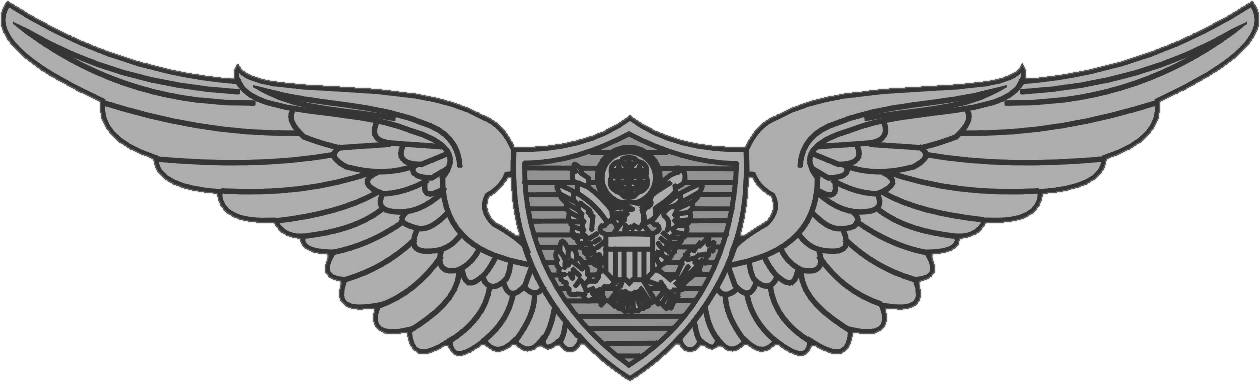

Aircraft Crewmember's Badge
Defense Distinguished Service Medal with 2 oak leaf clusters
| Army Distinguished Service Medal with 1 oak leaf cluster | Legion of Merit with 2 oak leaf clusters | Bronze Star with "V" device and 4 oak leaf clusters |
| Purple Heart with 2 oak leaf clusters | Meritorious Service Medal with 5 oak leaf clusters | Air Medal with "V" device and award numeral 9 |
| Army Commendation Medal with "V" device | Army Achievement Medal with 1 oak leaf cluster | Army Good Conduct Medal |
| Presidential Medal of Freedom | National Defense Service Medal with 2 service stars | Armed Forces Expeditionary Medal |
| Vietnam Service Medal with 2 campaign stars | Southwest Asia Service Medal with 2 campaign stars | Army Service Ribbon |
| Army Overseas Service Ribbon with award numeral 4 | Knight Commander of the Order of the British Empire | Vietnam Campaign Medal |
| Kuwait Liberation Medal (Saudi Arabia) | Kuwait Liberation Medal (Kuwait) | Cheon-Su Security Medal |
United States Central Command Badge

Right breast

Joint Meritorious Unit Award
| Valorous Unit Award | Republic of Vietnam Gallantry Cross Unit Citation Ribbon | Republic of Vietnam Civil Actions Unit Citation Ribbon |
Army Staff Identification Badge

== Personal life ==
Since 2003, Franks has operated Franks & Associates LLC, a private consulting firm, active in the disaster recovery industry. In June 2006, General Franks formed a partnership with Innovative Decon Solutions.

Following his retirement, Franks published his memoirs in American Soldier, which debuted as #1 on the New York Times Best Seller list in August 2004, displacing President Bill Clinton's memoir from the top spot. One reviewer praised General Franks's recollections of his Vietnam service but opined that the book, like the plan for and execution of the Iraq war itself, he said, "begins better than it ends." The reviewer expressed the wish that Franks had "relied less on the official record and more on his own experience and memories" in recalling the later war, as he had in recalling the earlier one.

Speaking at the Republican Convention in New York on 31 August 2004, Franks endorsed President George W. Bush for re-election. President Bush awarded Franks the country's highest civilian award, the Presidential Medal of Freedom on 14 December 2004. In the same month, Franks became a spokesman for Teen Arrive Alive, which is a company that uses GPS in cellular phones to tell parents how fast their teenage children are driving.

In December 2005, Franks was appointed to the Bank of America board of directors, a position he held until resigning on 11 June 2009 for unspecified reasons but as part of an "exodus" of ten directors from April to August 2009.

Franks also sits on OSI Restaurant Partners's board of directors. On 26 March 2008, he was elected to the board of directors of Chuck E. Cheese's.

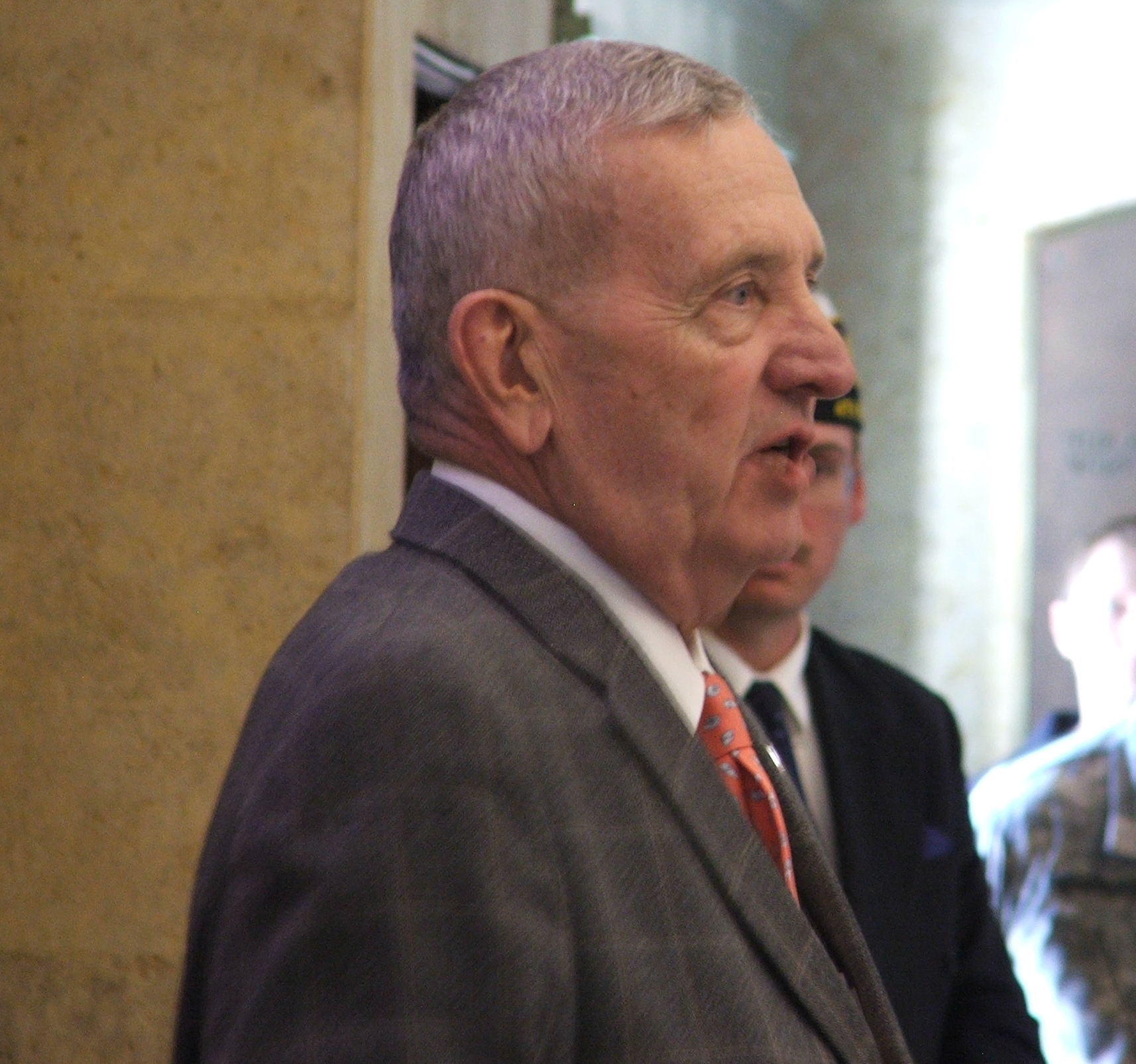
Franks speaking in Cedar Rapids, Iowa in 2014

Franks sits on the board of directors of the National Park Foundation. He is an advisor to the Central Command Memorial Foundation and the Military Child Education Coalition, and is a spokesman for the Southeastern Guide Dogs Organization.

Additionally he sits in the board of trustees for William Penn University, a university founded and supported by the Society of Friends (Quakers).

A museum dedicated to him lies in Hobart, Oklahoma.

Franks currently resides in Roosevelt, Oklahoma.

=== Charity controversy ===
In January 2008, ABC News and the Army Times reported on Franks's involvement with the charitable Coalition to Salute America's Heroes, which he charged $100,000 to use his name to raise money for wounded soldiers. Following Congressional investigators and watchdog groups' criticism because only 25% of the money found its way to wounded veterans, compared to the industry standard of 85%, Franks ended his support for the group in late 2005. Roger Chapin, president of the charity, and his wife had apparently been living a lavish lifestyle on the charity's money. Bob Schieffer, host of CBS's Face the Nation, criticized Franks, saying, "What kind of person would insist, or even allow himself, to be paid to raise money for those who were wounded while serving under him?" Franks said he severed his connection to the fundraiser when he realized most of the money he helped raise went to the fundraiser, not the troops".

Military offices
| Preceded by Anthony Zinni | Commander-in-Chief of United States Central Command; 2000–2003 | Succeeded by John Abizaid |
| Preceded by Robert R. Ivany | Commanding General of the Third United States Army; 1997–2000 | Succeeded by Paul T. Mikolashek |
