= Ra'ad al-Hamdani =

Retired Iraqi Republican Guard General

Ra'ad Majid Rashid al-Hamdani
- رعد مجيد الحمداني
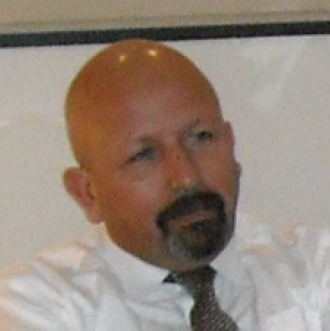
- Hamdani in 2009
- Born: 8 November 1951 (age 74); Baghdad, Kingdom of Iraq
- Military career
- Allegiance: Iraq
- Branch: Iraqi Army
- Service years: 1966–2003
- Rank: Lieutenant general
- Unit: Republican Guard
- Commands: 2nd Republican Guard Corps
- Conflicts: First Iraqi–Kurdish War; Yom Kippur War; Second Iraqi–Kurdish War; Iran–Iraq War; Gulf War; Iraq War: Battle of Karbala; Battle of the Karbala Gap; Battle of Baghdad

Ra'ad Majid Rashid al-Hamdani (Arabic: رعد مجيد الحمداني) is a retired Iraqi military officer and former General of the Iraqi Republican Guard, and was one of Saddam Hussein's favourite generals.

== Early career ==
Hamdani graduated from the Iraqi Military College in Baghdad in 1970 with a BA in military science.

He served in the 71st Brigade as a first lieutenant, which saw action on the Golan Heights as part of the 3rd Armoured Division during the Yom Kippur War. He attended Bakr University from 1978 to 1980 after the war and graduated with a MA in military science from the Iraqi Staff College during that time.

== Iran–Iraq War ==
During the Iran–Iraq War Hamdani served as a staff officer in various armoured and reconnaissance units, joined the Republican Guard in 1982, and served as a senior training officer between 1987 and 1989. He received both of Saddam Hussein's sons; Uday and Qusay, as well as Tariq Aziz's son, to serve as officers in his battalion. This was done as a political stunt, so Saddam and Tariq Aziz could claim their sons were fighting in the war. However, Hamdani was told not to let any of the sons die.

== Iraq War ==
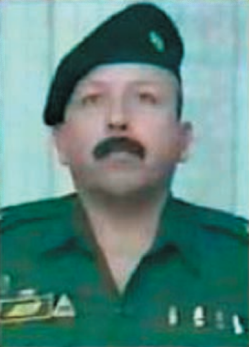
Hamdani as commander of the II Republican Guard Corps

Prior to the outbreak of the Iraq War, al-Hamdani knew that an outbreak of war was imminent between the United States and Iraq, and he sought to implement a strategy of partial force. He was approached by Qusay Hussein on 21 August 2002, who asked him about the possibility of war. When Hamdani confirmed that this was possible, Qusay asked for how long the Republican Guard could hold out against an attack. Hamdani responded that if his strategy of partial force was applied, the Republican Guard could last 6 to 8 months against an invasion. On 30 June 2002, during a meeting, Hamdani told Saddam Hussein, then-President of Iraq, that war with the United States was imminent. He proposed that to mitigate the decaying state of the military, that the Iraqi Armed Forces use the strategy of partial force. Although Saddam allowed him to explain for over 45 minutes, some Republican Guard and Ministry of Defense officials did not agree, his strategy was thus not applied in full.

As commander of the II Republican Guard Corps, Hamdani was given responsibility for the Karbala region. Hamdani was further stripped of units after Qusay Hussein believed that the U.S. invasion of the South was a feint. Hamdani protested this and argued that unless reinforcements were rushed to the Karbala gap immediately to prevent a breach, U.S. troops would reach Baghdad within 48 hours. His suggestions fell on deaf ears. Hamdani was ordered to launch a counterattack in response to the continued U.S. advance, resulting in a night raid on 2–3 April which was repulsed with heavy casualties. The U.S. counterattack the following morning totally routed the Republican Guard forces.

== After the war ==
Following the invasion of Iraq the Iraqi Army was dissolved by way of Coalition Provisional Authority Order 2. Hamdani, now no longer in the Iraqi military, was cleared of any political crimes by the Coalition forces. However, due to his status as a former Sunni army officer linked to the former Ba'athist government, Hamdani became a target for Shiite militias. As a result, Hamdani fled the country, alongside some 2 million other Iraqis. Hamdani moved to Amman in Jordan, where he works in military academia. As of 2008 Hamdani believed that were he to return to Iraq he would likely be killed.

Following the war Hamdani also founded the Association of Former Officers of the Iraqi Armed Forces, for which he is currently the chairman, and has been working to help reinstate former officers of the Iraqi Army into the new Armed Forces.

As of 2009, Hamdani was still in contact with the Iraqi Ba'ath Party, representatives of which had expressed to him their approval for his work to reintegrate former members of the Ba'athist regime into the new Iraq. Hamdani also claimed to have direct contacts with Mohammed Younis al-Ahmed al-Muwali, the rival to al-Douri for the party's leadership. Hamdani has claimed however that he only represents former military officials, but that he feels that the government does need to make more concessions to reintegrate former Ba'athists. Mohammed Salman al-Saady, Maliki's adviser for reconciliation, has claimed that talks with Hamdani had stalled due to Hamdani's demands being against government policy.

== Personal life ==
Hamdani is a Sunni Muslim who was born in Baghdad. He is a secularist, and is noted for his sense of humour and cosmopolitan attitude. He can read English, but cannot speak it fluently. As of 2009 he was living in Amman, Jordan, and was interviewed the same year for the Iraqi Perspectives Project. He built a close relationship with Qusay Hussein, who served in his battalion in the Iran–Iraq War. Hamdani believes this relationship likely kept him out of prison during the 1990s and saved him when he gave advice counter to Saddam's views. In 1992 he earned a PhD in military science from the Iraqi War College.

Hamdani featured in a historical television program made for RT Arabic, appearing in the episodes detailing the Yom Kippur War, the Gulf War, and the 2003 Invasion of Iraq. He also published his memoirs, entitled Before History Leaves Us, in 2007. He also appears in the LOOKSfilm/Lagardère Studios docuseries "Age of Tanks."
