= Presidential Security Service =

Presidential Security Service may refer to:

- Presidential Security Service (Belarus)
- Presidential Security Service (Russia)
- Presidential Security Service (South Korea)
