= T-72 tanks in Iraqi service =

Ba'athist-era Iraqi main battle tank

Lion of Babylon
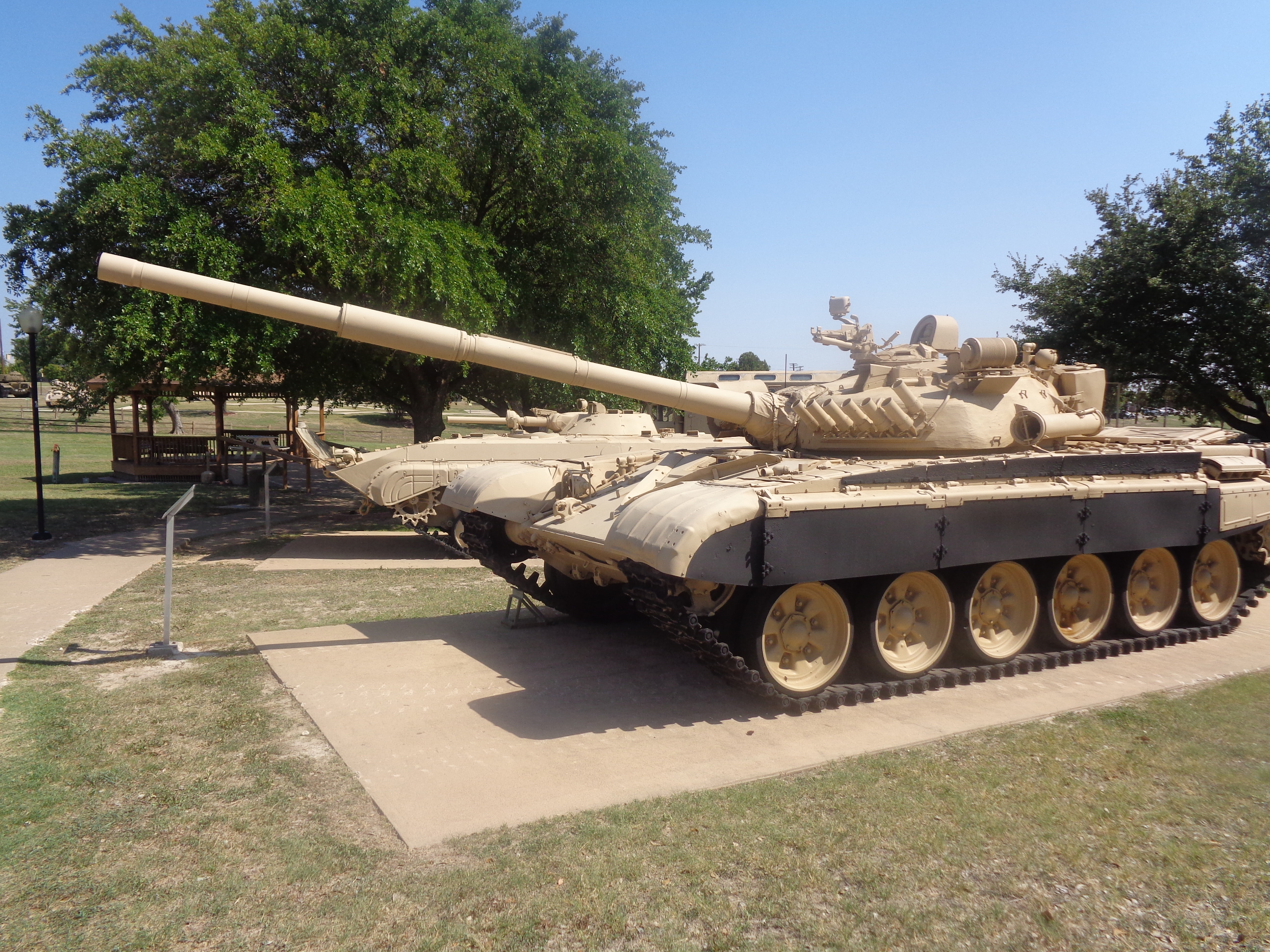
- A captured T-72 on display at the 1st Cavalry Division Museum, 2018
- Type: Main battle tank
- Place of origin: Iraq

Service history
- Wars: Persian Gulf War; Iraqi Invasion of Kuwait; Iraq War; 2003 invasion of Iraq; War in Iraq

Production history
- Designer: Kartsev–Venediktov
- Produced: 1989–1990?
- No. built: 500

Specifications
- Mass: 41.5 tonnes (45.7 short tons)
- Length: 9.53 m (31 ft 3 in) gun forward 6.95 m (22 ft 10 in) hull
- Width: 3.59 m (11 ft 9 in)
- Height: 2.23 m (7 ft 4 in)
- Crew: 3
- Armor: Composite
- Main armament: 125 mm 2A46M
- Secondary armament: 7.62 mm PKT coax machine gun; 12.7 mm NSVT antiaircraft machine gun or 12.7 mm DShK AA machine gun
- Engine: V-12 diesel 780 hp (582 kw)
- Power/weight: 18.8 hp/t
- Suspension: Torsion bar Some dampers removed to suit desert conditions
- Operational range: 425 km 600 km with fuel barrels
- Maximum speed: 60 km/h (road); 45 km/h (off-road)

During the early stages of the Iran-Iraq War, Iraq under the rule of Saddam Hussein imported a number of T-72 tanks from the Soviet Union and Poland. The tanks saw service in both the Gulf War and the Iraq War. In the late 1970s, Iraq also established a factory to retrofit and repair T-72s, and started the Lion of Babylon project (named after the Babylonian historical symbol of the same name) with the intent to assemble T-72s locally.

Weapons exported by the Soviet Union, including some T-72s, are known to have been significantly inferior to full-specification models in Soviet use like the Object 172M-E1 (E for "Eksportniy", i.e. export), the first export variant of the original T-72 model from 1973. While the basic Object 172M-E was sold to Warsaw Pact countries like Poland, the ČSSR and East-Germany, the E1 variant was fitted with a different NBC protection system and exported to countries like India and Iraq. In terms of performance, this tank should be equal to the T-72 tanks used by the Soviet Union and the Warsaw Pact unless there is some sort of NBC hazard contamination. The very first 100 T-72 main battle tanks purchased by Iraq from the Soviet Union were Object 172M-E1s.

The second model of the T-72 operated by Iraq was the Object 172M-E4, the main difference is the usage of a different NBC protection system. The first 250 T-72M tanks received by Iraq from Polish sources were delivered in this configuration. Performance-wise, this model should be better than the Object 172M-E, -E1, -E2 and be comparable to the Object 172M-E3 and less inferior.

Last but not least Iraq operated the Object 172M-E6, i.e. the variant of the T-72M1 meant for export outside of Warsaw Pact. It was identical to the version made for the latter group of countries aside of the different NBC protection system. How many of these tanks were delivered to Iraq is not known.

== History ==
In the 1970s and 80s, Iraq purchased a hundred T-72 from the Soviet Union. Iraq utilized these tanks during the Iran-Iraq War, which temporarily put T-72 exports to Iraq to a halt. Poland started delivering T-72s in January 1982, and in September 1982, Soviet exports resumed. Overall, Iraq received about 1,038 T-72 tanks, primarily produced in Poland. Some of these were destroyed during the Iran–Iraq War, or captured by the Iranians. In 1996, Iraq had 776 T-72 tanks in service.

Two years after the fall of Saddam Hussein, the new Iraqi Government acquired dozens of refitted T-72M1s from Hungary, in order to equip an armored brigade. The headquarters of this new Iraqi Army unit is located in Taji, where Iraq had attempted to assemble T-72s locally in the late 1980s. Some surviving T-72s are used for training, and the experience of Iraqi Army officers and crews with the T-72 was one of the reasons behind the choice of Hungarian T-72M1s.

== Combat history and performance ==
An Iraqi T-72 Asad Babil during arms exhibition

T-72 tanks saw service in the 1991 Persian Gulf War as well as the 2003 invasion of Iraq. Like other tanks in the Iraqi inventory, T-72s were mainly employed as armored self-propelled artillery, rather than in maneuver warfare roles. In operations, it fared poorly against American main battle tanks and armored fighting vehicles. For example, a 120 mm depleted uranium (DU) APFSDS round from an M1 Abrams could knock out a T-72 tank well beyond 3,000 m, while the effective range of the APFSDS 125 mm shell used by Iraq was 1,800 m.

The Iraqi T-72s used 3BM9 APFSDS shells (removed from Soviet service in 1973), with a penetration only 245 mm at a distance of up to 2,500 meters (8,200 ft). Poor maintenance also played a part against it: most of the Iraq fleet saw service in the Iran-Iraq War, but they weren't kept in pristine condition. Barrel erosion on the main guns was a significant issue, decreasing their accuracy.

The Iraqi T-72s, like most export versions, lacked then-modern night vision systems, though they had some night fighting tanks with older active infrared systems or floodlights - just not the latest starlight scopes and passive infrared scopes as on the Abrams.

Within closer ranges, the T-72 was more effective, especially while within prepared positions. Even in such conditions, it did not fare well against M1s − as proven in the Battle of Norfolk during Desert Storm, where the Iraqi tank shells fell short of their targets while the M1A1s began destroying their targets without suffering any casualties. (Note: "After the war they (TF 1-37th) returned to count the burned-out hulks of 76 T-72s, 84 BMPs, 3 air defense artillery pieces, 8 howitzers, 6 command vehicles, 2 engineer vehicles, and myriad of trucks.") The tank also participated in the Battle of Phase Line Bullet, where Bradley IFVs from the 4th squadron of the 7th Cavalry Regiment were driven back by dug-in Iraqi armoured vehicles at heavy cost.

While the T-72M1 armor was effective against all 105 mm threats during the 1980s, including Israeli tungsten carbide APFSDS rounds and older versions of the M1 Abrams armed with a 105 mm main gun; it was inadequate against the 120 mm gun of the M1A1 at normal combat ranges. Some T-72s were fitted with jamming pods to spoof anti-tank guided missiles such as the TOW and MILAN, but it proved to be ineffective. According to Zaloga, the United States modified the TOW guidance system before the war to counter them. According to an account from Atkinson, "one TOW appeared to skip across the hull of a T-72, hitting another one in the turret."

The US also developed a tandem-charge version in order to counter up-armoured Soviet tanks. There is evidence of at least one T-72 surviving a direct hit from an Abrams main gun in Mahmoudiyah in 2003. A 120 mm HEAT round from an Abrams impacted on the front of an Asad Babil turret at point blank range without producing a catastrophic kill. Some Iraqi T-72 tanks may have been fitted with explosive reactive armor, possibly obtained from Polish T-72M1 spare parts.

Another improvised armor upgrade may have also been added at the Taji complex: an additional 30 mm armor plate was welded onto the front areas of the hull and turret, leaving an air gap matching the size of the armor, so that the power of a HEAT jet could be dissipated in the hollow space. This technique follows the principle of spaced armor. The Iraqi engineers tested this reinforcement against captured Iranian 120 mm Chieftain tank guns in 1989, apparently with some success.

=== Iran-Iraq War ===
Iraq deployed Soviet-built T-72B and Czechoslovak and Polish built T-72Gs against Iranian forces during the Iran–Iraq War. Iranian 105mm M68 tank guns and TOW missiles were ineffective against the T-72s' front armor. Overall, Iraq lost 60 T-72s during the war. Ra'ad Al-Hamdani, a general in the Iraqi Republican Guard, noted that the 10th Iraqi Armoured Brigade, which was equipped with T-72s, was able to destroy the 16th Iranian Armoured Division within twelve hours, despite Iran's numerical superiority.

The division included Chieftain tanks against which the T-72 proved effective. Iran started the war with 894 Chieftains, of which only about 200 were left by the end of it. The 3BM9 APFSDS round was capable of penetrating the frontal armor of the Chieftain tank. Western observers, taking into account potential improvements on Soviet ammunition, concluded that the equivalent of 480 mm (19 in) of rolled homogeneous armour (RHA) would be necessary to prevent frontal penetration from the T-72 main gun. (Note: For comparison, the American M60A3 tank frontal armor had an effective thickness of 225 mm (8.9 in).) According to both sides, the T-72 was the most feared tank of the war.

=== Invasion of Kuwait ===
Prior to the Invasion of Kuwait, the Iraqis massed 100,000 troops and hundreds of T-54, T-55, and T-72 tanks alongside the border in an apparent act of harmless saber rattling. Once they managed to deceive Western intelligence agencies and the Kuwaitis, 350 tanks crossed the border with no resistance until they reached the outskirts of Kuwait City itself. While the initial resistance came from a pair of FV101 Scorpion light tanks, which were quickly destroyed by T-72s, the Iraqi advance was slowed down by the lack of ammunition: in order to keep the deception, only 24 T-72s of the Republican Guard carried full ammunition loads. Kuwaiti tanks, which also included a small number of Yugoslav-made M-84s (based on the T-72) engaged Iraqi tanks at the Mutla Pass on August 2, 1990, but were defeated; they did knock out one T-72.

=== Gulf War ===
The bulk of Iraqi armoured units were mostly equipped with the Type 69 and only Republican Guard divisions were equipped with Iraqi-modified T-72s, with exception of the regular army's armored Saladin division, so that T-72s only engaged with Coalition tank when Republican Guard units were involved.

During Desert Storm, Iraqi T-72s were technologically 20 years out of date. Only one M1 Abrams was officially documented during the Persian Gulf War as having received enough damage to be towed and receive maintenance after being struck three times on the turret by T-72 fire. Another six M1A1s were officially reported to have been hit by Iraqi T-72 tank fire, but the impacts were largely ineffectual. According to Atkinson and Scales, T-72s accounted for at least two M2 Bradley kills during Desert Storm and left several damaged, all on February 26, 1991. Overall, the T-72 offered little challenge to Abrams and Challenger tanks, both of which could hit a T-72 from outside T-72 range. In addition to lack of range, exploding munitions facilitated by the design of the tanks' ammunition loading system were also an issue for Iraqi T-72s.

=== 2003 Iraq War ===
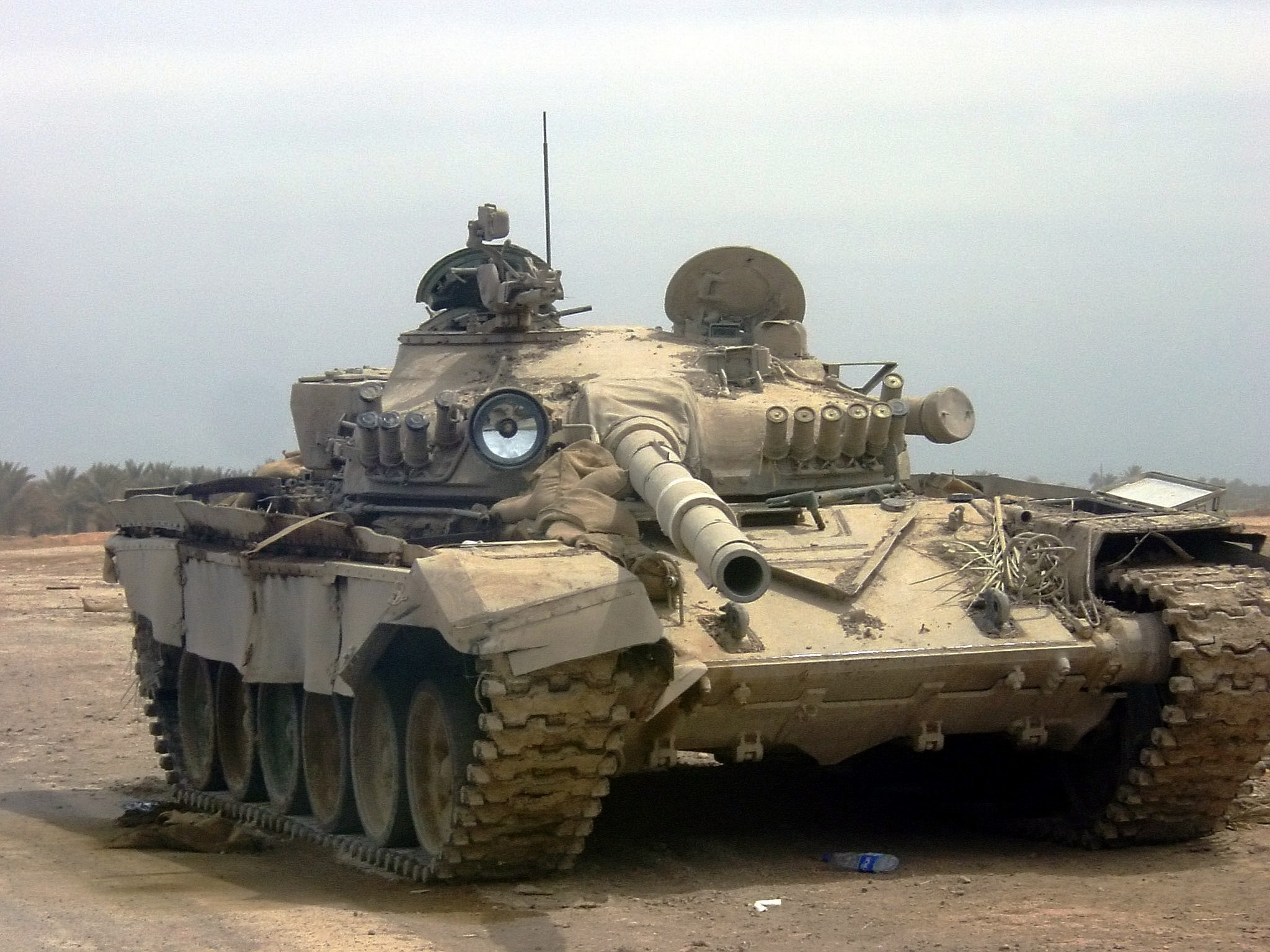
A T-72 abandoned after the U.S. attack into Baghdad.

During the 2003 invasion of Iraq, the Republican Guard's T-72s, most from the Medina Division, were deployed around Baghdad to attempt a last-ditch defense of the Baath regime. In April 2003, U.S. tanks engaged their counterparts from just 50 yards, destroying seven Iraqi T-72s without any losses. Such encounters exposed the poor marksmanship of Iraqi gunners, in part due to the shortage of modern night-vision and range-finder assets.

The T-72s were even more technologically lacking at this time, and it is not known if any improvements to the tanks were made between the Persian Gulf War and this conflict. Nonetheless, one Bradley was largely disabled by a 125 mm round from an Asad Babil tank when Iraqi armoured troops attempted to attack their American opponents near Baghdad airport.

The last operational T-72s acquired from the USSR and Poland were destroyed by the successive waves of American armored incursions on the Iraqi capital or abandoned by their crews after the fall of Baghdad, several of them without firing a single shot. The derelict tanks were later scrapped by U.S. Army disposal teams or shipped to the United States for target practice.

=== War against the Islamic State ===
In April 2017, the pro-government Hashed al-Shaabi militia used Iraqi-modified T-72Ms against forces of the Islamic State in clashes around the ancient city of Hatra. In the same year, the Iraqi army also used T-72s during the Battle of Mossul.

== Lion of Babylon project ==
In 1989, Iraq stated it was assembling T-72M1 tanks locally, under the designation "Lion of Babylon" (Arabic: أسد بابل, romanized: Asad Bābil) with local industry already producing some of the components and the ammunition. While the Iraqis did manage to produce the 125 mm gun barrels locally, there's little evidence that substantial numbers of T-72M1s were built beyond prototypes. Regardless of their origin, T-72M1 tanks in Iraqi service were commonly known as the Lion of Babylon.

In 1986 a West German company built a factory in Taji to manufacture steel for several military uses. It was enlisted to retrofit and rebuild tanks already on duty in the Iraqi Army, such as T-54/55s, T-62s, and several hundred of Soviet and Polish T-72s, imported during early stages of the war with Iran. In the late 1980s, plans were made to produce new T-72M1 tanks at that facility. These tanks were to be assembled from knockdown kits delivered by the Polish state-owned company Bumar-Łabędy.

Iraqi officials suggested that local assembly of the T-72 was to start in early 1989. A number of Iraqi officials such as Lt. General Amer Rashid, did not like the idea of being dependent on knockdown kits supplied by another country, and pushed for the complete production of the T-72M1 tank instead.

In 1991, the Taji plant was destroyed by an airstrike while being upgraded by Bumar-Łabędy.

The United Nations imposed an arms embargo following the Iraqi invasion of Kuwait in August 1990, which reduced the complete assembly of tanks to simple spare parts for T-72s and other tanks in the Iraqi arsenal. According to Polish officials, not a single T-72M1 had been assembled at the facility, even though in 1988 a supposedly locally produced T-72M was on display during an Iraqi arms show.

=== Specifications ===
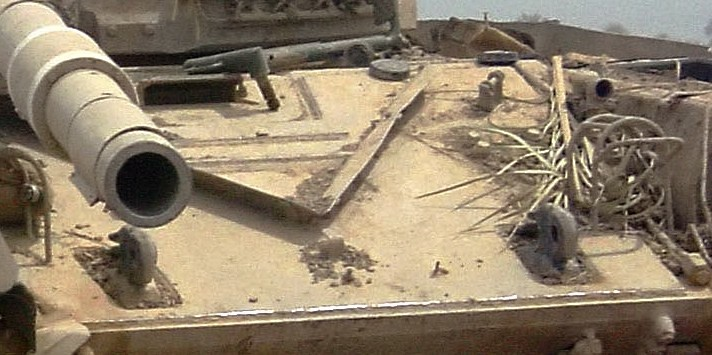
A plate of laminated armor welded on the glacis of a T-72. Note the edges around the rectangular section of the towing eyes and driver's hatch.

In most aspects, the Lion of Babylon as proposed was physically identical to the T-72M1 it is based on. The gun barrels produced by the Iraqis had a service life of only 120 shots, after which accuracy drops significantly. (Note: While the D-81TM main gun had an expected service life of 600 HE/HEAT rounds or 150 APFSDS rounds, export customers complained about barrels wearing out after firing around 100 APFSDS rounds.) The barrel wear problem was exacerbated by the fact that the Iraqis frequently used their tanks in the indirect fire role. The T-72M1, like the older T-72B and T-72G models, used a composite armoured glacis plate, about 200 mm (7.9 in) thick, composed of a layer of fiberglass or ceramic material sandwiched between steel plates, but with additional composite armor on both sides of the turret. A 30 mm (1.2 in) thick steel plate was also mounted on the front slope of the T-72M1 for increased protection.

According to official Russian sources the T-72M1 hull provided the equivalent of 400 mm (16 in) of RHA protection against Armour-piercing fin-stabilized discarding sabot (APFSDS) rounds and 490 mm (19 in) against High-explosive anti-tank (HEAT) rounds. The turret provided 380 mm (15 in) of protection against APFSDS and 490 mm (19 in) against HEAT.

American military intelligence believed some were equipped with Belgian-made thermal sights. These same sources claim the tank was also supposed to be provided with a better track protection against sand and mud than the Soviet T-72, by reducing the original number of shock absorbers. Some tanks also were fitted with a type of electro-optical interference pod of Chinese origin. As secondary armament, the tank was to feature either the NSV or the DShK 12.7 mm machine gun and the coaxial 7.62 mm PKT common to all T-72 models.
