= Chemical attack on Behbahan battalion =

Coordinates: 30°33′56.91″N 48°8′36.47″E

- Part of Battle of Shalamcheh (during the Iran–Iraq War)
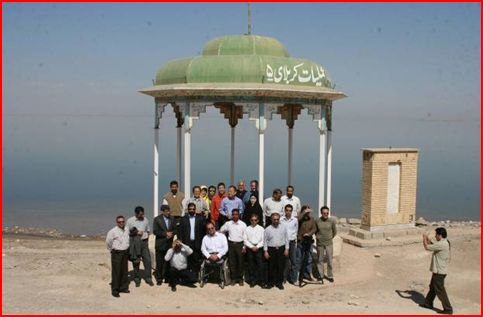
- A group of visitors by the monument at the site
- Operational scope: Tactical use of chemical weapons
- Planned by: Ba'athist Iraq
- Objective: Destroy the Iranian Behbahan batalion
- Date: 9 January 1986
- Executed by: Iraqi Air Force
- Outcome: 90 soldiers killed; dozens wounded with long-term physical disabilities

On 9 January 1987, at the beginning of the Battle of Shalamcheh, in the midst of the Iran–Iraq War, the Iranian Behbehan Battalion came under a heavy aerial chemical bomb attack by Iraqi forces. The Behbahan Battalion was positioned near Shalamcheh, in the south of Iran, about 10 km from the port of Khorramshahr.

The battalion was waiting for orders to be deployed to the front line when they were attacked. The Fadjr Battalion soldiers, numbering around 300, took refuge in an open-air shelter on the side of the road. The mustard gas bombs were dropped both on the road as well as on the sides of the road close to where the soldiers took shelter, and the resulting debris greatly affected them. Soon, a thick layer of poisonous smoke covered the whole area.

Due to the high volume of mustard gas that the bombs contained, many soldiers were poisoned, some losing their lives in the few hours after the attacks. Other soldiers were evacuated to field hospitals in Ahwaz and to medical centers in Tehran. Some of those who were not initially wounded stayed behind in the contaminated area of the battlefield to help get the wounded out.

From the over 300 soldiers present at the time of the attack, 90 lost their lives as a result of the chemical bombs within a few days. This is one of the highest mortality levels of mustard gas bombs known to date.

The surviving veterans have suffered from a variety of illnesses due to exposure to mustard gas, some having lost their lives in recent years due to complications. The most recent veteran to lose his life due to exposure to mustard gas at Behbahan was Enaytollah Nasseri, who died in late 2009 in a hospital in Tehran, suffering from a collapsed lung. In addition to the soldiers of the Fajr Battalion, soldiers from nearby battalions–including Fath Platoon–were also affected by the use of chemical bombs.

On each anniversary of this attack, surviving veterans, families of the dead soldiers, and other veterans from the Iran-Iraq War join the people of Behbahan to commemorate the victims and celebrate the lost lives of their loved ones. The annual ceremony takes place every January at the location where the gas attack took place, with thousands of people attending the ceremony each year.

In 2009 a delegation from Hiroshima attended the ceremony and paid tribute to the victims of the gas attack.

In January 2012, more than 4,000 people including war veterans and their families attended the memorial ceremony.

== See also ==
- Chemical bombing of Sardasht
- Halabja chemical attack
- Iran–Iraq War
- Iraq chemical attacks against Iran
- Iraqi chemical weapons program
