= Ahmad Zangiabadi =

Ahmad Zangiabadi Persian: احمد زنگی آبادی
- Born: 9 April 1965; Kerman, Iran
- Died: 18 November 2014 (aged 49); Tehran, Iran

Ahmad Zangiabadi (Persian: احمد زنگی آبادی, romanized: Aḥmad Zangī’abādī; 1965–2014) was an Iranian veteran. He undertook the control and defense of Arvand Rud during the Iran-Iraq war. He was injured in the Tala'ie region of Majnoon Island by sulfur mustard from chemical bombing by Iraqi forces.

== Early life ==
Ahmad Zangiabadi was born in Kerman on the 9 April 1965. He was 16 when he started to participate in the war, one year after it began in 1980.

== During the war ==
During the war, Ahmad was a sniper and volleyed RPG. He took responsibility for the control and defense of Arvand Rud, where he was a member of the volunteer army's logistics unit. On 12 April 1985, Ahmad and his unit were in the Tala'ie region of Majnoon Island, when a sulfur mustard chemical bomb was dropped by Iraqi planes. At the time, Ahmad was 19. Majnoon Island was covered by the chemical and they were left defenseless. Between 4pm and 10pm, the unit was incapacitated. Ahmad then realized that they were the subjects of a chemical bombing attack. They were taken to Ahvaz hospital. Ahmad's condition worsened: his eyes were severely burned, he started vomiting violently and his entire body began to break out in burns and blisters. He was later taken to Tehran's medical centers and hospitalized for 40 days. After his release, he returned to Kerman and started his activity in the support department of the staff war of Kerman. He often collected presents and sent them to soldiers.

== After the war ==
Due to the severity of his injuries, Ahmad's lungs were badly damaged. He was hospitalized and put on medication while a series of oxygen machines supported him for the rest of his life. He married Marzieh, who nursed him. He continued his education in English literature at Imam Hossein University until his eyesight became so weak from the bombing that he could no longer study. Ahmad and Marzieh had one son, named Hesam.

== Campaigner for peace ==
A committed campaigner for peace, Ahmad travelled with delegates from the Tehran Peace Museum to The Hague in April 2013. The group attended the Third Review Conference of the Chemical Weapons Convention at the Organisation for the Prohibition of Chemical Weapons (OPCW). Ahmad met Secretary-General of the United Nations Ban Ki-moon, and the OPCW's Director General, Ahmet Üzümcü, and asked them to redouble their efforts to make a world free of chemical weapons. At the 2013 conference of the Organisation for the Prohibition of Chemical Weapons, Ahmad Zangiabadi listed Iranian sacrifices. This Organization won the Nobel Peace Prize in 2012. He was the active member at the peace museum of Tehran.

== Death ==
Quoted from his obituary: he said, "Life has become a prison the past four months". On 18 November 2014, Ahmad Zangiabadi, died in Tehran.

== See also ==
- Disabled Iranian Veterans
- Iraq chemical attacks against Iran
