= Iraqi chemical weapons program =

Offensively and genocidally used chemical weapons

Coordinates: 33.8167°N 43.8000°E

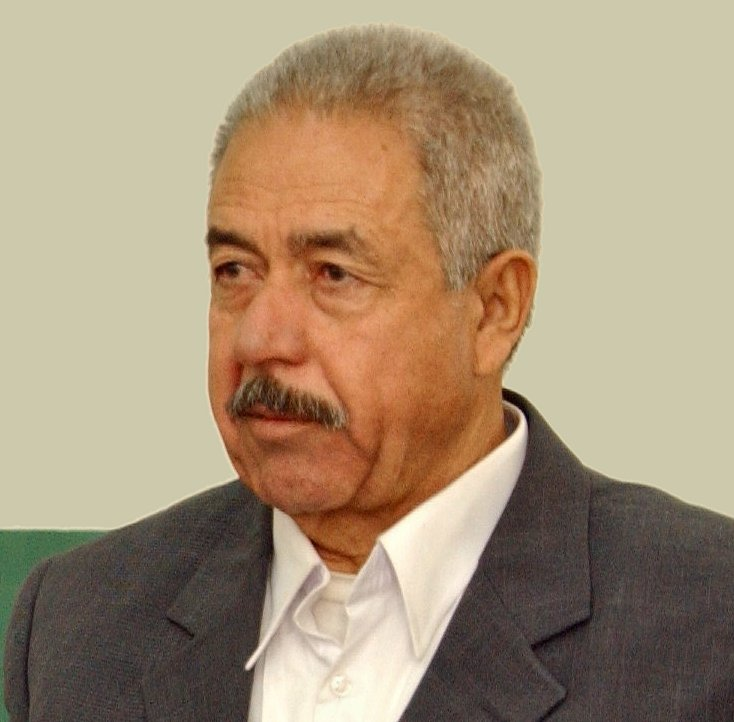
Iraqi military officer Ali Hassan al-Majid ("Chemical Ali"), who oversaw the use of chemical weapons during the Arabization campaigns in northern Iraq and the Iran–Iraq War. He was convicted of genocide and crimes against humanity in 2007, and was executed by hanging in 2010.

The Iraqi chemical weapons program was an aspect of the country's pursuit of weapons of mass destruction until the 1990s. In violation of the Geneva Protocol, Iraq initiated three separate research and development drives for chemical weapons, the first two of which (1970–1974; 1974–1978) were unsuccessful. The last drive (1978–1991), which was spurred by Iraqi president Saddam Hussein, was successful and saw the deployment of chemical weapons during the country's military campaigns against Iran and the Kurdish people.

Efforts by Iraq to acquire chemical weapons date back to the early 1960s and were motivated by a desire to greatly strengthen the Iraqi military, especially after the 1973 Arab–Israeli War. However, it was not until Saddam took power that the program experienced significant and steady progress. Though lacking stockpiles at the time of the Iraqi invasion of Iran in 1980, the country rapidly engaged in intensive research to produce and store chemical weapons, with real-time battlefield deployments serving as tests for the prowess of Iraqi forces in waging chemical warfare.

Beginning in 1983, Iraqi chemical attacks against Iran were confirmed by the United Nations to have taken place on multiple occasions over the course of the Iran–Iraq War, including more than 30 targeted attacks against Iranian civilians. It is estimated that these chemical attacks resulted in over 100,000 Iranian casualties, of which at least 20,000 were direct deaths upon exposure. The Iraqi military also used chemical weapons against Kurdish civilians during the 1988 Anfal campaign (as evidenced by the Halabja massacre), which resulted in the deaths of as many as 100,000 people, according to Human Rights Watch. In January 1991, during the Iraqi occupation of Kuwait, Iraq began firing missiles at civilian targets in Israel and at American troops in Saudi Arabia, raising concerns of potential chemical attacks, but all of the warheads used were conventional. However, chemical weapons were reportedly deployed again during the 1991 Iraqi uprisings.

According to Iraqi government sources, while the majority of its mustard gas was of 90–95% purity, it struggled to consistently produce nerve agents of high purity. The average purity of its tabun was 50–60%, but production was abandoned in 1986 in favour of concentrating on sarin. The average quality of sarin and related products was in the range of 45–60%, which was sufficient for immediate deployment against the Iranians, but not for long-term storage. The development of VX after 1988 was relatively unsuccessful, with the achieved purity of 18–41% considered insufficient for weaponization. The highly secretive Iraqi biological weapons program, which was discovered by the United Nations Special Commission during the Iraq disarmament crisis, pursued a similar course: Iraq had deployed biological warheads (containing anthrax and botulinum toxin) to attack the Gulf War coalition at various locations, but Hussein reportedly decided against using them. Continued concerns over Iraqi weapons of mass destruction contributed to the 2003 invasion of Iraq, though it was later discovered that Iraq had destroyed its stockpile in the 1990s.

== Production ==
=== Phases ===
On September 22, 1980, Iraq staged an all-out war on Iran from ground, air, and sea and came to occupy a vast part of Iranian territory. But in the following months it was evident that the Iranian nation was determined to reclaim its occupied territories. Contrary to the Iraqis' conception, the continued occupation of Iran required more effective weapons.

Saddam Hussein's chemical warfare development and use can be divided into three phases:

- Phase 1: January 1981 to June 1983, Iraq started testing chemical weapons.
- Phase 2: August 1983 to December 1983, chemical weapons were used to a limited extent.
- Phase 3: February 1984 to the end of the war, chemical weapons were used extensively.

Project 922 was the codename for Iraq's third and most successful attempt at producing chemical and biological weapons. Within three years (1978–1981), Project 922 had gone from concept to production for first generation Iraqi chemical weapons (mustard agent). By 1984, Iraq started producing its first nerve agents, Tabun and Sarin. In 1986, a five-year plan was drawn up that ultimately led to biological weapons production. By 1988, Iraq had produced VX. The program reached its zenith in the late 1980s during the Iran–Iraq War. From August 1983 to July 1988 Iran was subjected to extensive Iraqi chemical attacks. Between 1981 and 1991, Iraq produced over 3,857 tons of CW agents.

=== Private European aid ===
As part of Project 922, West German firms helped build Iraqi chemical weapons facilities such as laboratories, bunkers, an administrative building, and first production buildings in the early 1980s under the cover of a pesticide plant. Other West German firms sent 1,027 tons of precursors of mustard gas, sarin, tabun, and tear gasses in all. This work allowed Iraq to produce 150 tons of mustard agent and 60 tons of Tabun in 1983 and 1984 respectively, continuing throughout the decade. All told, 52% of Iraq's international chemical weapon equipment was of German origin. One of the contributions was a £14m chlorine plant known as "Falluja 2", built by Uhde Ltd, then a UK subsidiary of West German chemical company Hoechst AG; the plant was given financial guarantees by the UK Export Credits Guarantee Department despite official UK recognition of a "strong possibility" the plant would be used to make mustard gas. The guarantees led to UK government payment of £300,000 to Uhde in 1990 after completion of the plant was interrupted by the first Gulf War. Saddam’s son Qusay was said to have been put in charge of concealing chemical weapons from international inspectors. In 1994 and 1996 three people were convicted in Germany of export offenses.

== Deployment ==
=== Iran–Iraq War (1980–1988) ===
On September 22, 1980, Iraq launched an invasion against Iran, marking the beginning of the eight-year Iran–Iraq War. The Iraqi army, trained and influenced by Soviet advisors, had organic chemical warfare units and a wide variety of delivery systems. Neither side achieved dominance and the war quickly became a stalemate. To stop the human-wave–attack tactics of the Iranians, the Iraqis employed their home-produced chemical agents as a defensive measure against the much-less–prepared Iranian infantry. The first reported use of chemical weapons occurred in November 1980.

==== United Nations statistics ====
Throughout the next several years, additional reports of chemical attacks circulated, and by November 1983, Iran notified the UN that Iraq was using chemical weapons against its troops. After Iran sent chemical casualties to several Western nations for treatment, the UN dispatched a team of specialists to the area in 1984, and again in 1986 and 1987, to verify the claims. The conclusion from all three trips was the same: Iraq was using chemical weapons against Iranian troops and civilians. In addition, the second mission stressed that Iraq's use of chemical weapons appeared to be increasing. The reports indicated that mustard gas and tabun were the primary agents used and that they were generally delivered in bombs dropped by an airplane. The third mission (the only one allowed to enter Iraq) also reported the use of artillery shells and chemical rockets and the use of chemical weapons against civilian personnel.

In the letter of transmittal to the UN after the conclusion of the third mission, the investigators pointed out the dangers of this chemical warfare:

It is vital to realize that the continued use of chemical weapons in the present conflict increases the risk of their use in future conflicts. In view of this, and as individuals who witnessed first hand the terrible effects of chemical weapons, we again make a special plea to you to try to do everything in your power to stop the use of such weapons in the Iran–Iraq conflict and thus ensure that they are not used in future conflicts. ... In our view, only concerted efforts at the political level can be effective in ensuring that all the signatories of the Geneva Protocol of 1925 abide by their obligations. Otherwise, if the Protocol is irreparably weakened after 60 years of general international respect, this may lead, in the future, to the world facing the specter of the threat of biological weapons.

==== United States statistics ====
Declassified documents later revealed that the United States was both aware of Iraq's use of chemical weapons, and also facilitated its acquisition of chemical and biological precursors which were used to make weapons.

Another analyst insisted that "In a sense, a taboo has been broken, thus making it easier for future combatants to find justification for chemical warfare, this aspect of the Iran–Iraq War should cause Western military planners the gravest concern." The Iran–Iraq War failed to reach a military conclusion despite Iraq's use of chemical weapons. Roughly 5% of the Iranian casualties were caused by chemical weapons. The toll may surpass 90,000 though, according to Iranian experts, since the latency period is as long as 40 years. In August 1988, Iran finally accepted a UN ceasefire plan. One of the factors that led to this decision was the fear of chemical attacks against Iranian civilians, since Saddam had used them against civilians in the past and that caused "no major international outcry".

=== Gulf War (1990–1991) ===
==== Missile attacks on Israel and Saudi Arabia ====
During the Persian Gulf War of 1991, under orders by Saddam Hussein, large numbers of missiles were fired on Israel and Saudi Arabia. Besides causing many deaths and extensive property damage, it was feared that the missiles could be armed with nerve gas leading the Israeli and Saudi governments to distribute gas masks to all their citizens.

==== Gassing of Kurds and Shia Muslims ====
Shortly after the fighting between Iraq and Coalition Forces in the Gulf War came to a cease-fire in February 1991, reports circulated that Saddam Hussein was using chemical agents against Kurds and Shiite Muslims, near UN troops. The United States intercepted a message ordering the use of chemical weapons against the cities of Najaf and Karbala. U.S. President George H. W. Bush's response was that such use of chemical weapons would result in air strikes against the Iraqi military organization using the chemicals.

== List of known Iraqi chemical attacks ==
The Iran–Iraq War ended in August 1988. By that time, according to the Iraq Survey Group Final Report, seven UN specialist missions had documented repeated use of chemicals in the war. According to Iraq itself, it consumed almost 19,500 chemical bombs, over 54,000 chemical artillery shells and 27,000 short-range chemical rockets between 1983 and 1988. Iraq declared it consumed about 1,800 tons of mustard gas, 140 tons of Tabun, and over 600 tons of Sarin. Almost two-thirds of the CW weapons were used in the last 18 months of the war.

All of this suggests that Iraq was in violation of the Geneva Protocol, a law that prohibits the use of chemical weapons. But how could Iraq have used chemical weapons repeatedly for five years without the Security Council's intervention? according to CIA reports, the Reagan administration continued to aid Saddam despite knowing that he was carrying out the worst chemical attacks in history against Iran.

Examples of CW use by Iraq include the following from the Final Report. (These are selected uses only. Numerous other smaller scale CW attacks occurred.)

=== Against Iranians and Kurds, 1983–1988 ===
Iraqi chemical attacks during Iran–Iraq War
Date	Event	Location	Type	Casualties*
1983, August		Haj Umran	mustard	less than 100 Iranian/Kurdish casualties
1983, October–November		Panjwin	mustard	3,000 Iranian/Kurdish casualties
1984, February–March		Majnoon Island	mustard	2,500 Iranian casualties
1984, March	Operation Badr	al-Basrah	tabun	50–100 Iranian casualties
1985, March	Battle of the Marshes	Hawizah Marsh	mustard and tabun	3,000 Iranian casualties
1986, February	Operation Dawn 8	al-Faw	mustard and tabun	8,000 to 10,000 Iranian casualties
1986, December		Um ar-Rasas	mustard	1,000 Iranian casualties
1987, April	Siege of Basra (Karbala-5)	al-Basrah	mustard and tabun	5,000 Iranian casualties
1987, June	Chemical bombing of Sardasht	Sardasht	mustard	8,000 Iranian civilians exposed
1987, October		Sumar/Mehran	mustard and nerve agent	3,000 Iranian casualties
1988, March	Halabja chemical attack	Halabjah, Iraq	mustard and nerve agent	3,200-5,000 Iraqi Kurds, mostly civilians
1988, April	Second Battle of al-Faw	al-Faw	mustard and nerve agent	1,000 Iranian casualties
1988, May		Fish Lake	mustard and nerve agent	100 or 1,000 Iranian casualties
1988, June		Majnoon Island	mustard and nerve agent	100 or 1,000 Iranian casualties
1988, May–June		villages around Sarpol-e Zahab, Gilan-e-gharb and Oshnavieh		Iranian civilians
1988, July		South-central border	mustard and nerve agent	100 or 1,000 Iranian casualties
* The actual casualties may be much higher, as the latency period is as long as 40 years.

=== Against Kurds, 1988 ===
On March 16, 1988, the Halabja massacre occurred. The Iraqi army hit residential areas of the Iraqi city with sarin gas and the roads leading out of the city with mustard gas the day after. An estimated 3,200 to 5,000 people were killed. Most of the victims were Kurdish Iraqi civilians who died within minutes after the bombing and those who survived and tried to leave the city the following day were injured when they passed contaminated roads.

In the meanwhile, an Iraqi high-ranking authority officially confessed in a meeting with Javier Pérez de Cuéllar, the Secretary-General of the United Nations for the utilization of chemical weapons by Iraq.

=== Against Kurds and Shia Muslims, 1991 ===
- March 1991: an-Najaf – Karbala area – Nerve agent & CS, Shi'a casualties not known.

== Destruction after the Gulf War ==
During and after the Gulf War, the destruction of Iraq chemical weapon and ammunition facilities, including the Khamisiyah Ammunition Storage Facility, released sarin into the atmosphere. Exposure to sarin causes permanent damage to humans, resulting in the mass illness known as Gulf War syndrome.

During the Iraq War, United States Army soldiers discovered multiple extant chemical weapon stockpiles that had not been destroyed.

== See also ==
- Chemical Weapons Convention#Iraqi stockpile
- Iraq and weapons of mass destruction
  - Iraqi biological weapons program
- Rationale for the Iraq War
  - WMD conjecture after the 2003 invasion of Iraq
- Alleged British use of chemical weapons in Mesopotamia in 1920
