= Chemical bombing of Sardasht =

1987 chemical bombing in Iran by Iraq

- Part of Iran–Iraq War
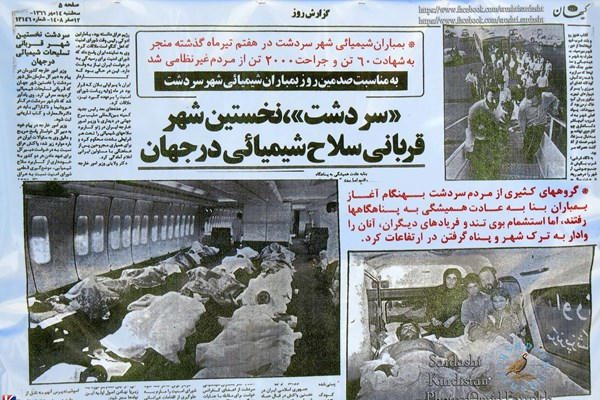
- News of the 1987 chemical bombing of Sardasht in Kayhan newspaper
Date	28 June 1987
Location	36°09′19″N 45°28′44″E
Result	Out of 12,000 inhabitants, 8,000 were exposed.: Many of the 95% who survived the gas attack developed serious long-term complications over the next few years. These included serious respiratory problems, eye lesions, skin problems, and immune system dysfunction

Belligerents
Iraq	Iran

Casualties and losses
- 130 deaths (109 civilians; 21 military and other)

On 28 June 1987, Iraq dropped mustard gas bombs on Sardasht, West Azerbaijan, Iran. In two separate bombing runs on four residential areas, the attack killed 130 people and injured 8,000. The gas attacks occurred during the Iran–Iraq War when Iraq frequently used chemical weapons against Iranian civilians and soldiers.

In 2006, a quarter of the town's 20,000 residents were still experiencing severe illnesses from the attacks. The film Walnut Tree (2020) was inspired by the event.

== Background ==
In 1986, the President of the Security Council of the United Nations stated that the Council members were "profoundly concerned by the unanimous conclusion of the specialists that chemical weapons on many occasions have been used by Iraqi forces against Iranian troops ... [and] the members of the Council strongly condemn this continued use of chemical weapons in clear violation of the Geneva Protocol of 1925, which prohibits the use in war of chemical weapons." The United States voted against the issuance of this statement.

Mustard gas is not considered a lethal agent but an incapacitating agent, causing only 3–5% mortality.

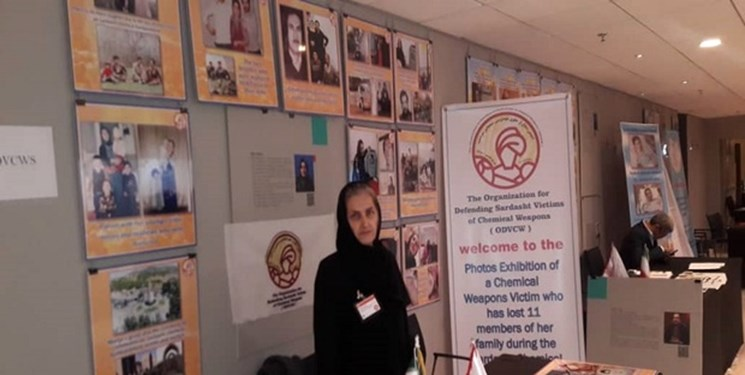
Organisation for the Prohibition of Chemical Weapons Sardasht victims exhibition

== Effects and Aftermath ==
Included among the casualties requiring medical attention were some of the rescuers.

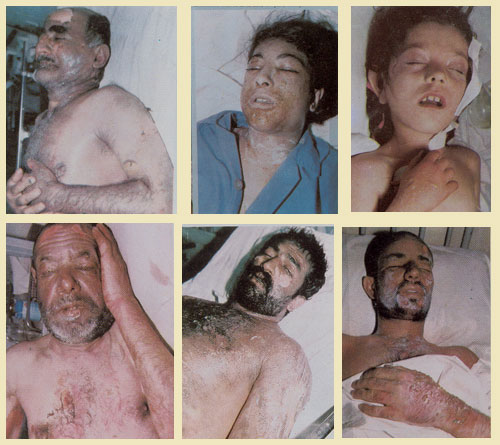
Victims of the attack

By 2007, 130 people (109 civilians, 21 military) had died as a result of the attack. Of the civilians who died, 39 were under 18 years of age, including 11 under the age of 5, and 34 were women or girls.

Many of the 95% who survived the Sardasht gas attack developed serious long-term complications over the next few years, including serious respiratory problems, eye lesions, skin problems, and immune system problems.

== Response ==
Iran announced this (chemical) assault on Sardasht as an inhumane attack and named Sardasht as the first city which was the victim of chemical armament in the world after the Atomic bombings of Hiroshima and Nagasaki.

In April 2004, the Tehran Public Court ruled that the United States government was liable for the attacks due to its support of Saddam Hussein's government. The US government was ordered to pay $600 million compensation to the victims.

On 28 June 2004, in commemoration of the chemical bombing of Sardasht, one of the streets of Sardasht was named Hiroshima. A Japanese delegation from Nagasaki and Hiroshima talked at the ceremony. 111 white pigeons were released into the sky at the site of the victims. In the city of Hiroshima, a street is named after Sardasht, and every year the mayor of Hiroshima sends a message on the occasion of 28 June, and a group of Iranian NGO related to chemical disarmament travel to Japan to participate in the anniversary of the Hiroshima bombing. Iranian NGOs also has the annual exhibition in The Hague, the Netherlands, liaising with associations of victims of weapons of mass destruction in other countries, establishing a peace museum focusing on the effects of chemical weapons, membership in the International Network of Peace Museums, participation in the anniversary of Hiroshima and Nagasaki in Japan.

At the beginning of the 2026 Iran war, a series of Iranian missiles launched at American and Israeli targets featured the slogan "blood revenge of the martyrs of the chemical attacks on Halabja and Sardasht", and Iranian sources portrayed it as revenge which finally arrived after 38 years.

== See also ==
- Sardasht, West Azerbaijan
- Iraq chemical attacks against Iran
- Chemical attack on Behbahan battalion
- War of the Cities (of Iran-Iraq war)
- Halabja chemical attack
- Disabled Iranian veterans
- Iraqi chemical weapons program
