= Iraqi chemical attacks against Iran =

Iraqi use of chemical weapons during the Iran–Iraq War

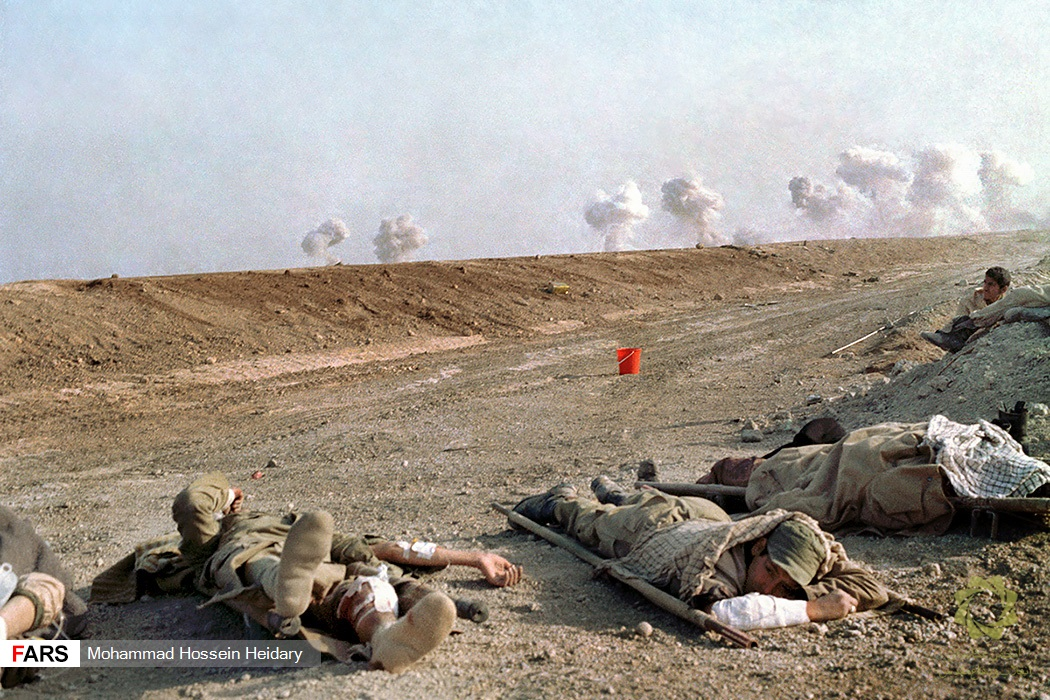
Iranian troops wounded by Iraqi mustard gas attacks during Operation Kheibar, 1984, on Iraq's Majnoon Island.

During the Iran–Iraq War (1980–1988), Iraq engaged in chemical warfare against Iran on multiple occasions, including more than 30 targeted attacks on Iranian civilians. Originally using mustard gas alone, in 1984 Iraq initiated the first verified combat use of nerve agents in history, beginning with tabun before moving to sarin.

The Iraqi chemical weapons program, which had been active since the 1970s, was aimed at regulated offensive use, as evidenced in the chemical attacks against Iraqi Kurds as part of the Anfal campaign in the late 1980s. The 1988 Halabja massacre in Iraqi Kurdistan, which killed at least 3,200 people, is considered one of the worst attacks of the war. The Iraqis had also utilized chemical weapons against Iranian hospitals and medical centres. According to a 2002 article in the American newspaper The Star-Ledger, 20,000 Iranian soldiers and combat medics were killed on the spot by nerve agents. As of 2002, 5,000 of the 80,000 survivors continue to seek regular medical treatment, while 1,000 are hospital inpatients.

Operationally, Iraqi forces transitioned from artillery attacks, to low-altitude bombing, to high-altitude bombing. Nerve agents, with a lower persistency, were used on Iranian frontlines, and dissipated in time to be safely overrun by Iraqi forces. Mustard gas with its higher persistency was used for area denial and attack the rear of the battlefield. Iraq exploited the high temperatures that made it difficult for Iranian troops to wear protective suits and masks for extended periods.

Strategically, by the end of the war Iraqi chemical warfare had crippled Iranian morale. The threat that Iraqi Scud ballistic missiles, used with conventional warheads in the conflict's war of the cities, would carry chemical weapons caused fleeing of Iranian urban areas. Alongside 1988 ground and naval defeats, this is considered one of the reasons Iran accepted the United Nations-brokered ceasefire in August.

Though the use of chemical weapons in international armed conflict was banned under the Geneva Protocol, much of the international community remained indifferent to the attacks; Iraq's military campaign in Iran was supported by the United States and the Soviet Union, both of whom had sought to contain Iranian influence after the Islamic Revolution of 1979. Despite this, following the first nerve agent use in the 1984 Battle of the Marshes, the United States condemned Iraqi chemical attacks and began formal discussions at the Conference on Disarmament on what would become the 1993 Chemical Weapons Convention, comprehensively outlawing chemical weapon production, stockpiling, and use.

== Background ==
After the 1973 Arab–Israeli War, Iraq decided to improve all aspects of its army. Iraqi General Ra'ad al-Hamdani stated that, despite careful analysis of the 1973 Arab–Israeli War, no clear progress in the Iraqi army was achieved by the Ba'ath Party. In comparison to their Israeli counterparts, the Iraqi Army was faced with a significant deficit in technological expertise. In 1979, due to Saddam Hussein's policies as well as those of leading Ba'ath Party officials and senior military officers, the Iraqi Army underwent increasing politicization. There was a saying at the time, "better a good Ba'athist than a good soldier". During the early months of the Iran–Iraq War, Iraq attained successes because of Ba'ath Party interference and its attempts to improve the Iraqi Army, but the essential problem was that the military leaders did not have a clear strategy or operational aim for a war.

Reporter Michael Dobbs of the Washington Post stated that Reagan's administration was well aware that the materials sold to Iraq would be used to manufacture chemical weapons for use in the war against Iran. He stated that Iraq's use of chemical weapons was "hardly a secret, with the Iraqi military issuing this warning in February 1984: 'The invaders should know that for every harmful insect, there is an insecticide capable of annihilating it ... and Iraq possesses this annihilation insecticide.'" According to Reagan's foreign policy, every attempt to save Iraq was necessary and legal.

According to Iraqi documents, assistance in the development of chemical weapons was obtained from firms in many countries, including the United States, West Germany, the Netherlands, the United Kingdom, and France. A report stated that Dutch, Australian, Italian, French and both West and East German companies were involved in the export of raw materials to Iraqi chemical weapons factories.

== History ==
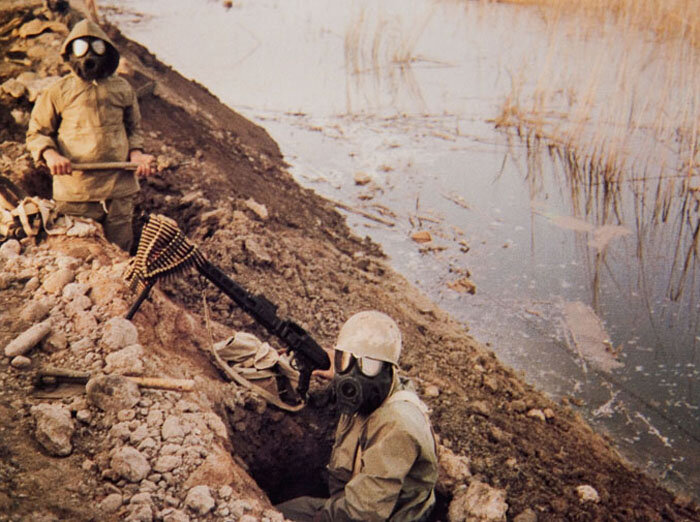
Two Iranian soldiers wear gas masks, during Operation Badr in 1985.

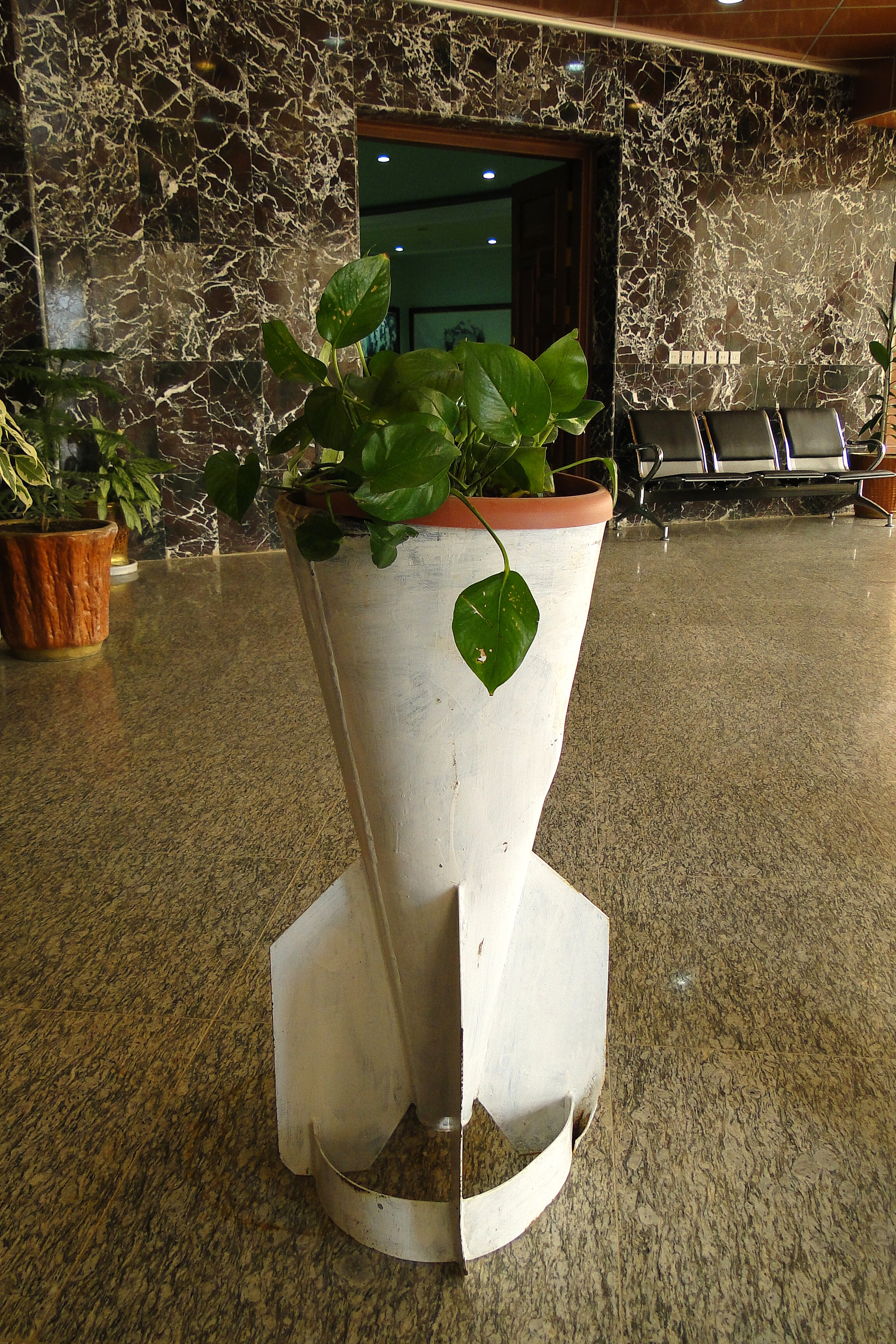
An original bomb casing used as flower pot at the Halabja Memorial Monument in 2011

Chemical weapons were employed by Iraqi forces against Iranian combatants and non-combatants during the Iran–Iraq war (1980–1988). These have been classified based on chemical composition and casualty-producing effects. The best-known substances used by the Iraqi army were organophosphate neurotoxins, known as nerve agents Tabun, Sarin, and the blister agent mustard gas. According to Iraqi reports, in 1981, vomiting agents were used in initial and small-scale attacks. In August 1983, chemical weapons had been employed on the Piranshahr and Haji Omaran battlefields. Next, they were used on the Panjwin battlefield, in November 1983. The Iraqi army began extensive chemical attacks in 1984, by using tons of sulfur mustard and nerve agents on the Majnoon Islands.

In 1986, the Iranian forces mounted an attack on the Faw Peninsula southeast of Basra and occupied the peninsula. This attack had not been anticipated by the Iraqi military, which did not prepare for an assault on the Faw Peninsula from across the Shatt Al-Arab. The integration and cooperation between the Iranian Army and various militias allowed them to organize operations during winter 1985–1986 carefully. As a result, Iraq's oil wells were in danger. Iraqi General Hamdani called the fighting for the liberation of the peninsula another "Battle of the Somme", where both militaries suffered huge losses. The chemical attacks played an important role in Iraq's success. The chemical attacks took place until the last day of war, in August 1988. During the eight-year Iran–Iraq War, more than 350 large-scale gas attacks were reported in the border areas.

== Attacks on civilians ==
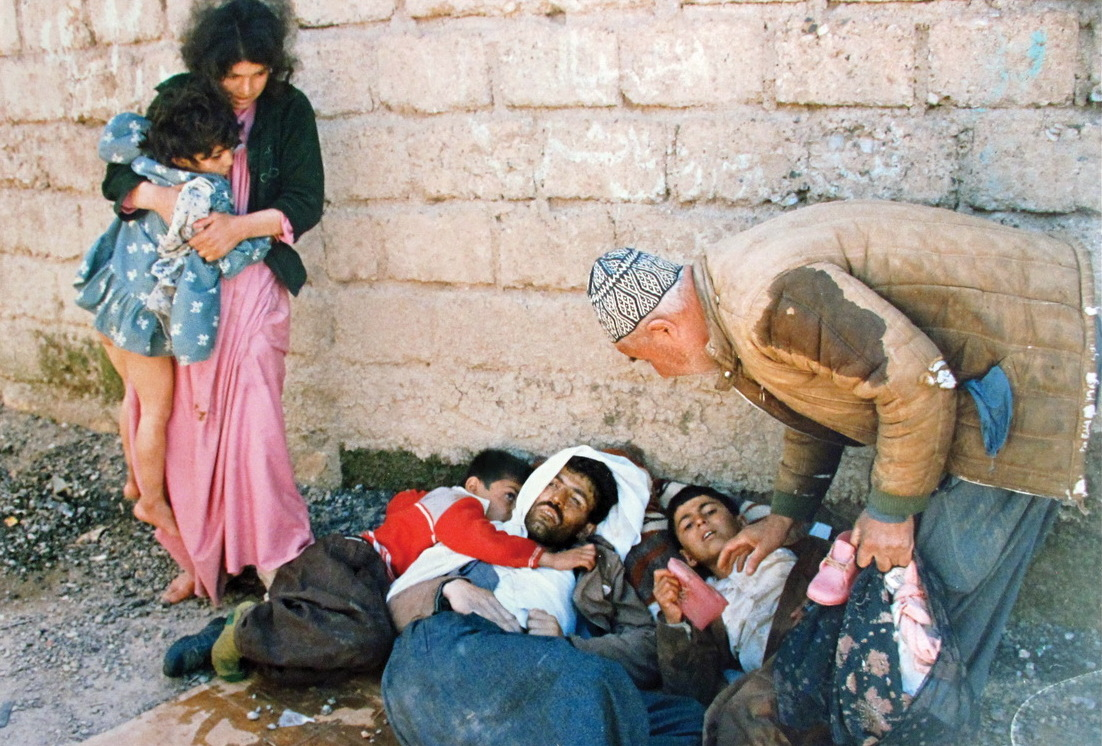
Victims of Halabja chemical bombing

The Iraqi Army employed chemical weapons in attacks against combatants and non-combatants in border cities and villages and more than 30 attacks against Iranian civilians have been reported, as follows:

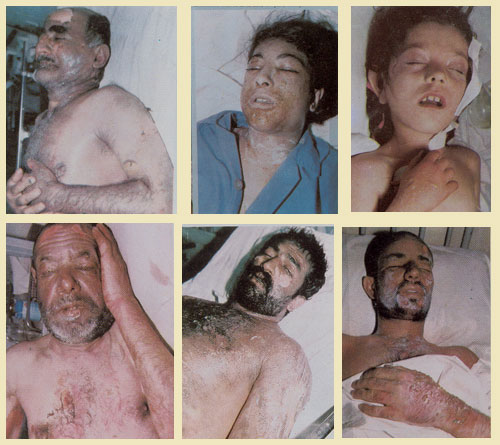
Victims of the 1987 chemical attack on Sardasht, West Azerbaijan

- On 28 June 1987 in Sardasht, West Azerbaijan
- In March 1988 in villages around the city of Marivan
- In May–June 1988 in villages around the cities of Sarpol-e Zahab, Gilan-e-gharb and Oshnavieh

There have been chemical attacks by the Iraqi army against medical centers and hospitals.

== Casualties ==
In a declassified 1991 report, the CIA estimated that Iran had suffered more than 50,000 casualties from Iraq's use of several chemical weapons, though current estimates are more than 100,000, as the long-term effects continue to cause damage. The official CIA estimate did not include the civilian population contaminated in bordering towns or the children and relatives of veterans, many of whom have developed blood, lung and skin complications, according to the Organization for Veterans of Iran. According to a 2002 article in the Star-Ledger, 20,000 Iranian soldiers were killed on the spot by nerve gas. As of 2002, 5,000 of the 80,000 survivors continue to seek regular medical treatment, with 1,000 being hospital inpatients.

List of known Iraqi chemical attacks during Iran-Iraq War
Date	Event	Location	Type	No. of casualties*	Type of casualties
1983, August		Haj Umran	mustard	<100	Iranians / Iraqi Kurds
1983, October–November		Panjwin	mustard	3,000	Iranians / Iraqi Kurds
1984, February–March	Operation Kheibar	Majnoon Island	mustard	2,500	Iranians
1984, March	Operation Badr	al-Basrah	tabun	50–100	Iranians
1985, March	Battle of the Marshes	Hawizah Marsh	mustard and tabun	3,000	Iranians
1986, February	Operation Dawn 8	al-Faw	mustard and tabun	8,000-10,000	Iranians
1986, December		Umm ar-Rasas	mustard	1,000	Iranians
1987, April	Siege of Basra (Karbala-5)	al-Basrah	mustard and tabun	5,000	Iranians
1987, June	Chemical bombing of Sardasht	Sardasht	mustard	8,000 exposed	Iranian civilians
1987, October		Sumar/Mehran	mustard and nerve agent	3,000	Iranians
1988, March	Halabja chemical attack	Halabjah and villages around Marivan	mustard and nerve agent	1,000	Iranian civilians
1988, April	Second Battle of al-Faw	al-Faw	mustard and nerve agent	1,000	Iranians
1988, May		Fish Lake, Iraq	mustard and nerve agent	100 or 1,000	Iranians
1988, June		Majnoon Island	mustard and nerve agent	100 or 1,000	Iranians
1988, May–June		villages around Sarpol-e Zahab, Gilan-e-gharb and Oshnavieh			Iranian civilians
1988, July	Tawakalna ala Allah Operations	South-central border	mustard and nerve agent	100 or 1,000	Iranians
* The actual casualties may be much higher, as the latency period is as long as 40 years.

== International convention ==
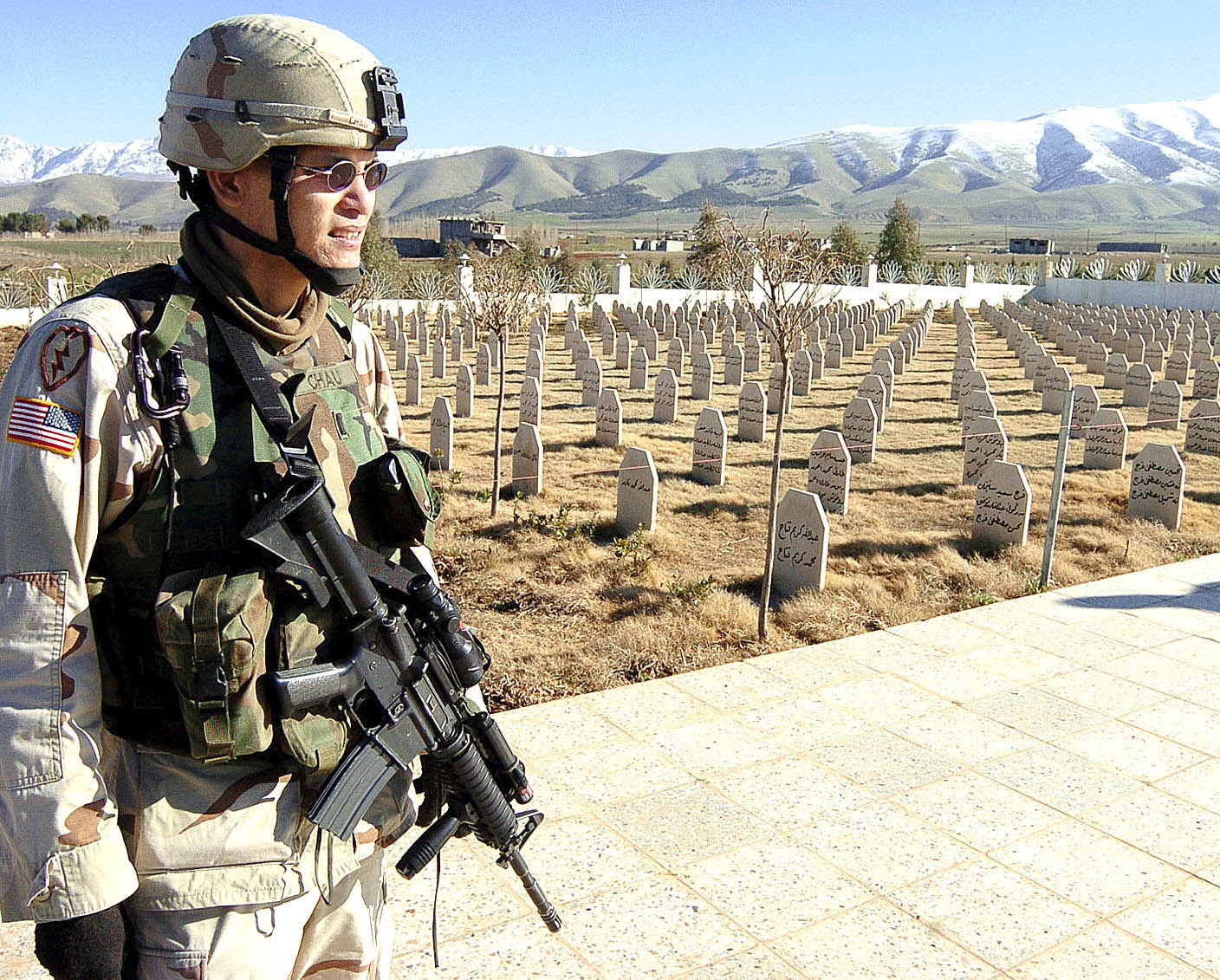
An officer of the U.S. 25th Infantry Division patrolling a local cemetery for some 1,500 victims in 2003

Because of reports implying the use of chemical weapons by the Iraqi army, a presidential directive was issued by the U.S. Iran asked the UN to engage in preventing Iraq from using chemical weapon agents, but there were no strong actions by the UN or other international organizations. UN specialist teams were dispatched to Iran at the request of the Iranian Government, in March 1984, April 1985, February–March 1986, April 1987, and in March, July and August 1988. As a result, according to the field inspections, clinical examinations of casualties and laboratory analyses of samples done by the UN fact-finding team's investigations, the use by the Iraqi army of mustard gas and nerve agents against Iranians was confirmed. The Security Council ratified these reports and two statements were issued, on 13 March 1984 and 21 March 1986, condemning Iraq for those chemical attacks, but the Iraqi regime did not abide by those condemnations and continued launching chemical attacks.

== See also ==
- Disabled Iranian veterans
- Ahmad Zangiabadi
- Iraqi chemical weapons program
