= Penjwen District =

Penjwen District قەزای پێنجوێن Arabic: قضاء بنجوين
- District
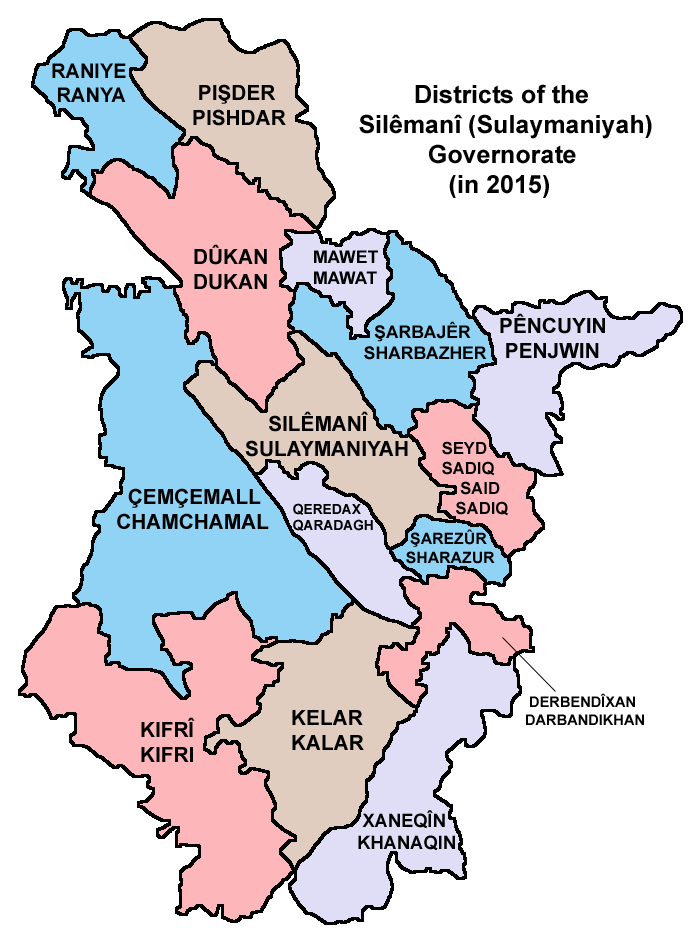
- Districts of the Sulaymaniyah Governorate. Penjwen is located in the top-right
- Coordinates: 35.62366°N 45.94954°E
- Country: Iraq
- Autonomous Region: Kurdistan Region

Area
  - Total: 1,138 km^{2} (439 sq mi)
- Elevation: 1,272 m (4,173 ft)

Population (2020)
  - Total: 48,307
- Time zone: UTC+3 (AST)

Penjwen District (Arabic: قضاء بنجوين; Sorani Kurdish: قەزای پێنجوێن, romanized: Qezay Pêncwên) is a district of the Sulaymaniyah Governorate in Kurdistan Region, northern Iraq. During the Iran–Iraq War, much of the area was destroyed by aerial bombardments displacing thousands of people in the district. The main targets of the aerial bombardments by the Iraqi warplanes were the local Kurds. The name 'Penjwen' originates from the Kurdish words 'Penj' meaning 'five' and 'Jwen' meaning 'young' in the local dialect and its name comes from the five Kurdish settlements that originated in the region known as the "five new" or "five young" settlements. Penjwen is now known for its lush forests, mountains, and springs for tourism.

== See also ==
Kurdistan

Iraqi Kurdistan

Kurdistan Region
