= Sardasht, West Azerbaijan =

City in West Azerbaijan province, Iran

Sardasht Persian: سردشت Sorani Kurdish: سەردەشت
- City
- Location within Iran
- Coordinates: 36°09′19″N 45°28′48″E
- Country: Iran
- Province: West Azerbaijan
- County: Sardasht
- District: Central
- Elevation: 1,480 m (4,860 ft)

Population (2016)
  - Total: 46,412
- Time zone: UTC+3:30 (IRST)

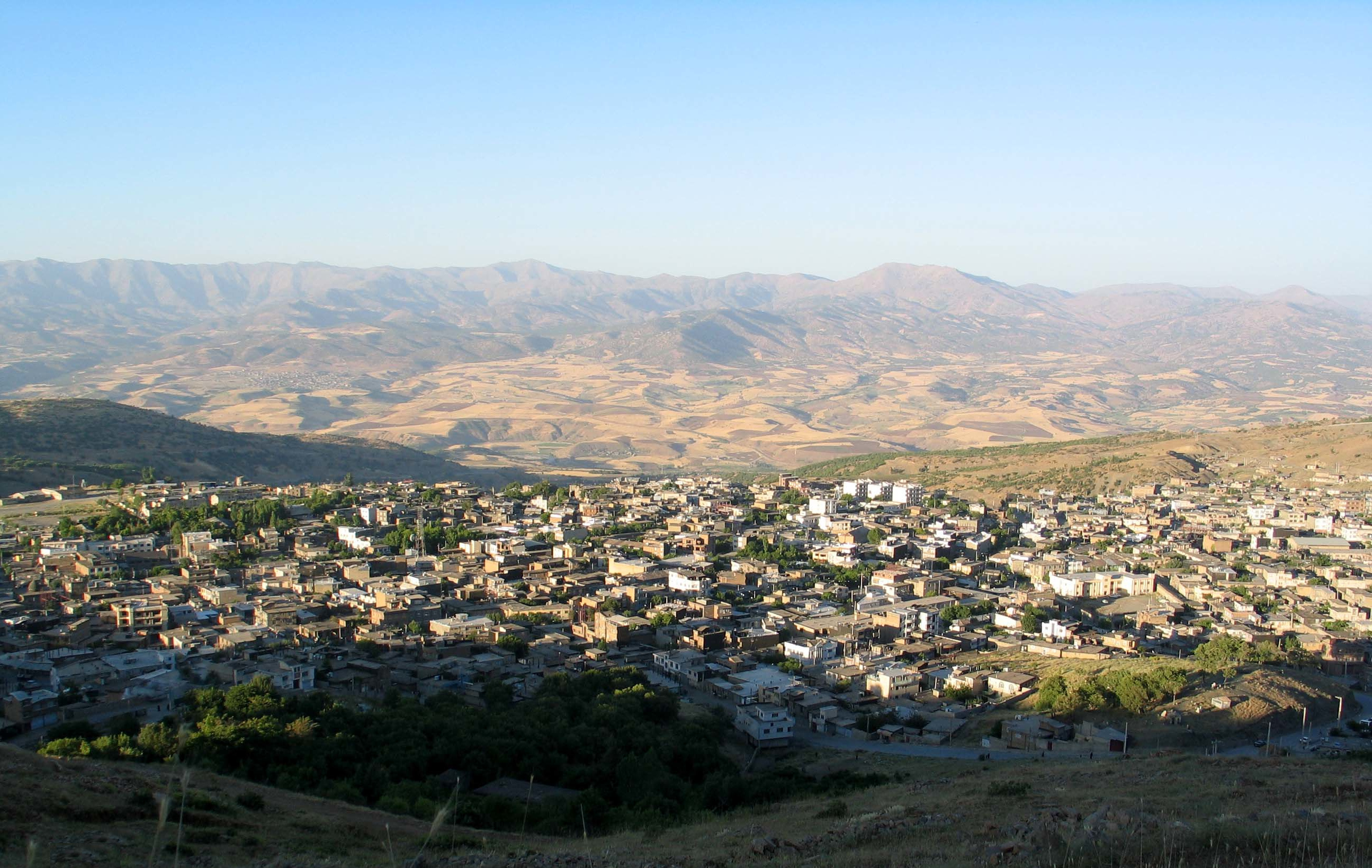
Sardasht

Sardasht (Persian: سردشت) (Note: Also romanized as Sar Dasht; Sorani Kurdish: سه‌رده‌شت, romanized as Serdeşt) is a city in the Central District of Sardasht County, West Azerbaijan province, Iran, serving as capital of both the county and the district.

Sardasht, far from the frontline, was notably attacked with chemical weapons by Iraqi forces under Saddam Hussein during the Iran–Iraq War. It was the first deliberate chemical attack against civilians.

== Etymology ==
A popular belief is that Sardasht (or Zardasht) comes from the Kurdish word for Zoroaster. Sardasht can also be split into two words: sar (English: head) and dasht (English: plain). Both words in combination mean head of the [surrounding] plains that extend all the way to a river.

== History ==
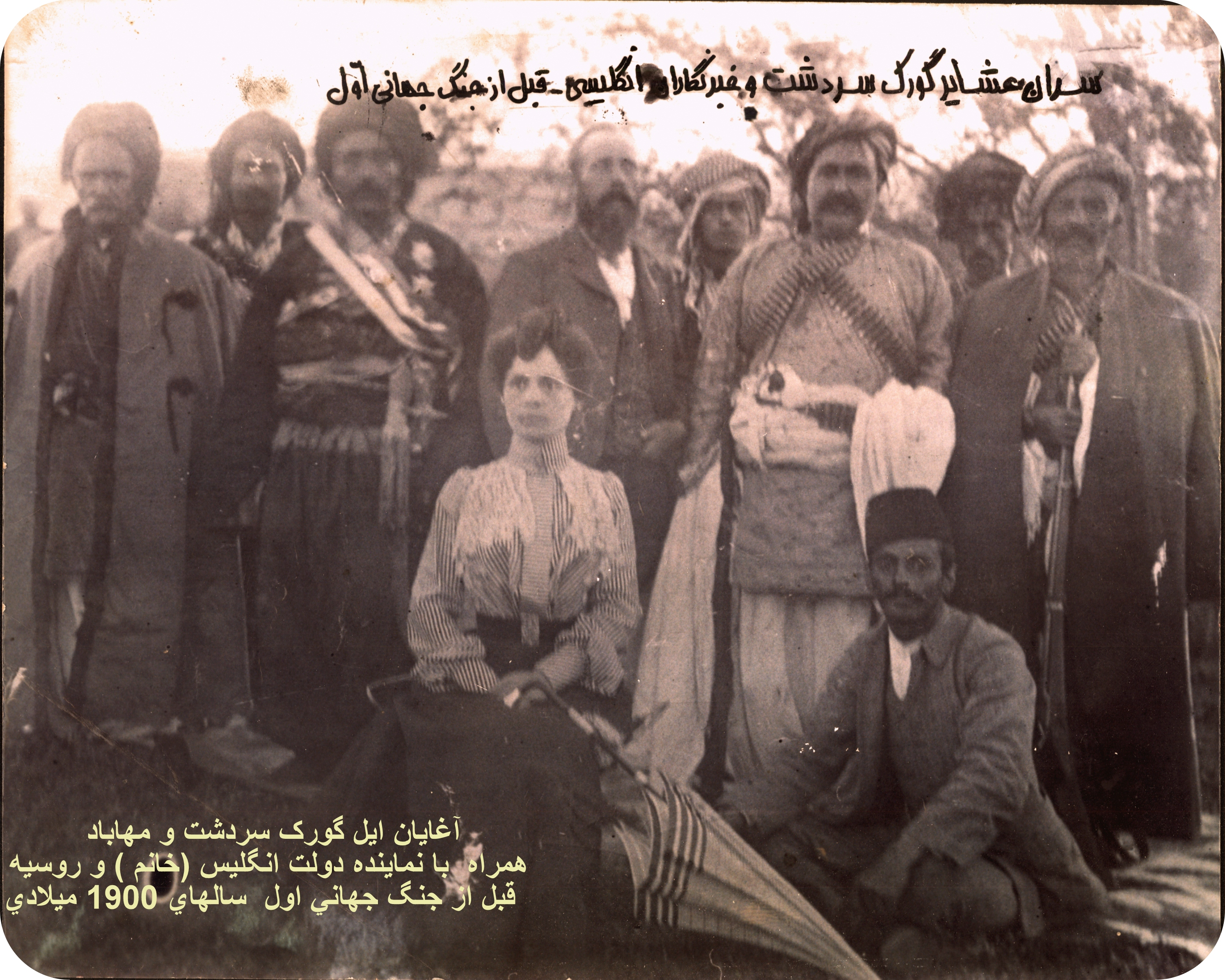
Gawerk Lords in Iranian Kurdistan - Mahabd - sardasht-آغایان ایل گورک در سردشت و مهاباد 1900 میلادی

=== Pre–Islamic era ===
In pre–Islamic times, Sardasht was located to the northwest of its current location and was close to a large spring. The city was also called Nizerou and had five towers. Sardasht is a historical area with a selection of ancient pre–Islamic sites still present today. Near Sardasht there is a castle which dates back to the Parthian Empire.

In 1906, Ottoman forces occupied Sardasht and on November 1912, Ottoman troops withdrew from the city after a six-year occupation.

=== 1987 attacks on Sardasht with chemical weapons ===
On June 28, 1987, Iraqi aircraft dropped what Iranian authorities believed to be mustard gas bombs on Sardasht, in two separate bombing runs on four residential areas. The numbers of victims were initially estimated as 10 civilians dead and 650 civilians injured.

Out of a population of 20,000, 25% are still suffering severe illnesses from the attacks. The gas attacks occurred during the Iran–Iraq War, when Iraq frequently used chemical weapons against Iranian civilians and soldiers.

In April 2004, the government of the United States (US) was found by the Tehran Public Court to be liable for the attacks, through its previous support for the government of Saddam Hussein. The US government was ordered to pay $600 million compensation to the victims.

Because Sardasht was not considered a military target, the population was both unprotected and unprepared for a chemical weapons assault. Living close to the border and to the war front, citizens had become accustomed to Iraqi bombardment with conventional weapons. However, people later told physicians that they did not know that the bombs carried chemical weapons; in fact, at first they had been relieved when the bombs did not explode.

Due to the direction of the wind, even the hospital and the convalescent center were contaminated, and the few doctors and nurses who were working there had to leave. Two public baths were used for decontamination of the victims and a small stadium was converted to a 150-bed medical facility. Within the first few hours, about 30 people died, mostly young children and old people, due to severe respiratory problems.

Out of 12,000 inhabitants, according to official reports, 8,000 were exposed. Of the 4,500 requiring medical care, 1,500 were hospitalized, 600 of them in Tehran. The other 3,000 were treated as outpatients and discharged. Many of these 3,000 former outpatients left the city for the villages and attempted to treat themselves, using traditional medicines, etc. These people do not have medical records of their exposure and now are having difficulty obtaining government benefits.

Included among the 4,500 casualties requiring medical attention were some of the rescuers.

Casualties up until 2007: altogether 130 people (109 civilians, 21 military and other) have died from the sulfur mustard attack on Sardasht in June 1987. Twenty people died in the first few hours, ten during the evacuation to other cities, and about one hundred more died in hospitals in Iran and Europe during the next month. Of the civilians who died, 39 were under 18 years of age, including 11 under the age of 5. Thirty-four women and girls died.

Mustard is not considered a lethal agent, but an incapacitating agent, causing only 3-5% mortality. Many of the 95% who survived from the Sardasht gas attack, developed serious long-term complications over the next few years including serious respiratory problems, eye lesions, skin problems as well as problems in their immune system.

=== Iran–PJAK conflict ===
Sardasht and its surrounding areas became a scene of sporadic clashes between Iranian IRGC forces and the militant Kurdish PJAK organization. Among those clashes was the August 2013 Sardasht clash.

== Demographics ==
=== Ethnicity ===
Kurds are the dominant ethnicity in Sardasht.

=== Population ===
At the time of the 2006 National Census, the city's population was 37,115 in 8,224 households. The following census in 2011 counted 42,167 people in 10,491 households. The 2016 census measured the population of the city as 46,412 people in 12,551 households.

== Geography ==
=== Location ===
Sardasht is southwest of Lake Urmia about 1,480 metres above sea level.

=== Climate ===
Sardasht has a Mediterranean-influenced hot-summer humid continental climate (Dsa) according to the Köppen climate classification.

Climate data for Sardasht, Āzarbāijān-e Gharbī (1986-2010 normals)
Month	Jan	Feb	Mar	Apr	May	Jun	Jul	Aug	Sep	Oct	Nov	Dec	Year
Record high °C (°F)	16 (61)	13.8 (56.8)	21.1 (70.0)	27.2 (81.0)	32.0 (89.6)	35.2 (95.4)	39.6 (103.3)	38.2 (100.8)	34.4 (93.9)	29.6 (85.3)	20.0 (68.0)	18.0 (64.4)	39.6 (103.3)
Mean daily maximum °C (°F)	1.5 (34.7)	3.1 (37.6)	8.5 (47.3)	15.0 (59.0)	20.9 (69.6)	27.5 (81.5)	31.4 (88.5)	31.4 (88.5)	26.8 (80.2)	19.8 (67.6)	11.0 (51.8)	5.2 (41.4)	16.8 (62.3)
Daily mean °C (°F)	−0.9 (30.4)	0.4 (32.7)	5.3 (41.5)	11.2 (52.2)	16.5 (61.7)	22.7 (72.9)	26.5 (79.7)	26.3 (79.3)	22.1 (71.8)	16.0 (60.8)	7.9 (46.2)	2.7 (36.9)	13.1 (55.5)
Mean daily minimum °C (°F)	−3.3 (26.1)	−2.3 (27.9)	2.1 (35.8)	7.3 (45.1)	12.2 (54.0)	17.8 (64.0)	21.4 (70.5)	21.1 (70.0)	17.3 (63.1)	11.8 (53.2)	4.6 (40.3)	−0.2 (31.6)	9.1 (48.5)
Record low °C (°F)	−25 (−13)	−19.6 (−3.3)	−16.6 (2.1)	−2.4 (27.7)	−1.8 (28.8)	7.8 (46.0)	13.0 (55.4)	11.4 (52.5)	5.8 (42.4)	2.6 (36.7)	−9.2 (15.4)	−12.8 (9.0)	−25 (−13)
Average precipitation mm (inches)	122.9 (4.84)	123.9 (4.88)	125.1 (4.93)	125.2 (4.93)	48.7 (1.92)	4.6 (0.18)	1.5 (0.06)	1.5 (0.06)	2.8 (0.11)	43.1 (1.70)	106.9 (4.21)	135.0 (5.31)	841.2 (33.13)
Average precipitation days (≥ 1.0 mm)	11.3	9.9	10.8	10.1	5.9	1.1	0.5	0.4	0.7	4.7	7.8	10.2	73.4
Average relative humidity (%)	70	69	61	55	44	31	31	29	30	44	58	66	49
Average dew point °C (°F)	−4.2 (24.4)	−4.6 (23.7)	−1.6 (29.1)	1.8 (35.2)	3.1 (37.6)	4.3 (39.7)	7.2 (45.0)	5.7 (42.3)	2.5 (36.5)	2.4 (36.3)	−0.2 (31.6)	−2.9 (26.8)	1.1 (34.0)
Mean monthly sunshine hours	133.0	138.4	184.0	219.2	288.3	352.8	367.7	357.5	312.0	248.0	180.7	129.8	2,911.4
Source: IRIMO(dew point and sun 1986-2005)

== See also ==
- Chemical warfare
- Chemical bombing of sardasht
