= Disabled Iranian veterans =

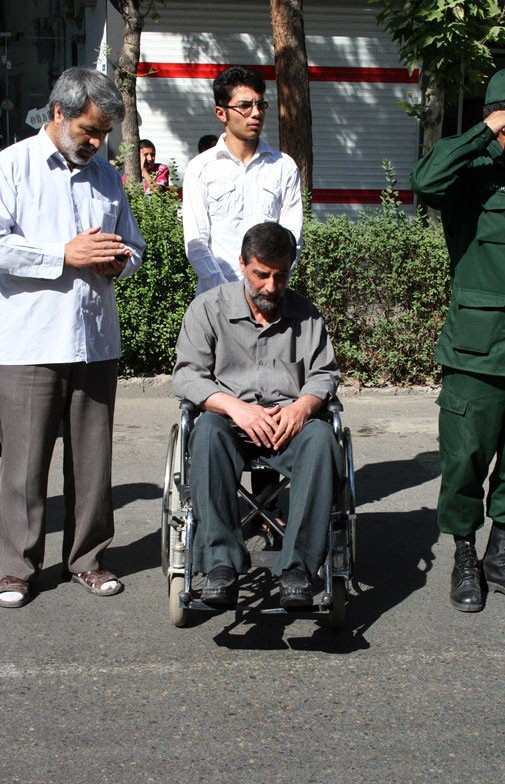
An Iranian disabled veteran

Disabled Iranian veterans, called janbaz (Persian: جانباز, literally "those who were willing to lose their lives") in Iran, mostly constitute the disabled veterans of the Iran–Iraq war. According to Mohammad Esfandiari, director of communications and public relations of Iran's Martyrs and Disabled Veterans' Organization, there are 548,499 disabled veterans of the Iran–Iraq War living in Iran as of June 2014, a number which includes the victims of Iraq's chemical weapon attacks on Iran, called "chemical janbaz" (Persian: جانباز شیمیایی). Among the disabled veterans are more than 10,000 veterans with foot and ankle injuries related to war.

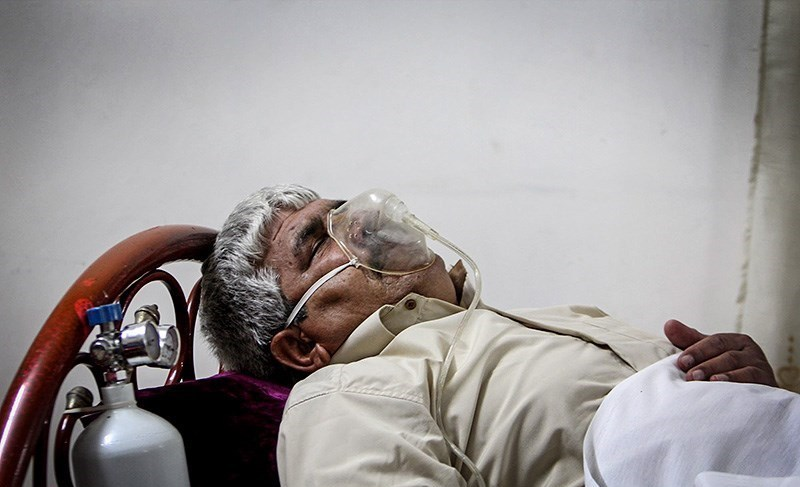
Chemical Janbaz receiving oxygen by mask.

== Chemical warfare veterans ==
After Iraqi chemical attacks against Iranian soldiers and civilians that occurred from 1983 to 1988, over 3,400 Iranians reportedly sustained injuries, including respiratory (42%), ocular (39%) and skin complications (25%) – a number which increased to at least 45,000 twenty years later "due to the occurrence of late respiratory complications of mustard gas exposure." "The latency period can be as much as 40 years" and "So almost every day there are new cases — 30 years after the war," said Shahriar Khateri, co-founder of the Society for Chemical Weapons Victims Support. According to Farhad Hashemnezhad in 2002, at least 20 percent of the patients were "civilians who didn't think they were close enough to be exposed." This large number of chemically affected veterans has made Iran the world's largest laboratory for the study of the effects of chemical weapons.

According to a declassified CIA report, as a result of Iraq's repeated use of nerve agents and toxic gases in the 1980s, Iran suffered more than 50,000 casualties mostly by mustard gas used in dusty, liquid and vapor forms packed into bombs and artillery shells that were then fired at targets including front lines and hospitals. According to Shahriar Khateri, by 2014 the number of registered chemically affected veterans was 70,000. "awareness could have saved lives," Khateri said. Doctors estimate that the final toll of Iraq's chemical weapons could be as high as 90,000, equal to the total deaths from all toxic gases in World War I. It also was the "first time ever that nerve agents such as sarin and tabun were employed."

== PTSD and other mental disorders ==
PTSD and other mental disorders have increased in aging Iranian war veterans.

== Services ==
Mobility and access to medical care are one of the major challenges for many disabled Iranian veterans. In Tehran alone there are very few wheelchair-accessible ramps, elevators and parking spots and the problem is more serious in smaller cities. This is while by 2018 over 5,000 disabled Iranian veterans, mostly living in the capital, are reliant on wheelchairs for mobility. According to the Tehran Metro Group many more elevators are needed in Tehran's subway system. To provide better services for disabled veterans, the Iranian government has announced that around $5 million has been dedicated to constructing ramps and wheelchair-accessible paths throughout Tehran. No similar official plans are dedicated for other cities in Iran.

In Tehran, chemical weapons victims are often referred to the Sasan Hospital.

The Tehran Peace Museum plans to focus on the enduring human consequences of Iran–Iraq War and serves as a centre for surviving victims of the war, especially chemical warfare veterans attacked by Saddam Hussein's forces.

In addition to numerous laws and regulations the Iranian government has passed to address disability related issues, the Disability Protect Act, including 16 articles providing legal protections for disabled persons in areas such as public building access, education, housing and finance, has been Iran's most progressive and comprehensive legislation concerning disabled persons which was passed in 2003.

The Janbazan Foundation is created by Iran government for the assistance of Iranian disabled veterans and for giving them special treatment. They also receive services such as financial loan from Foundation of Martyrs and Veterans Affairs.

== In popular culture ==
Veterans are presented with awards and thanked for their service in formalities such as ceremonies, which are widely covered in the Iranian media. The "Disabled Veterans' Day" in May and Sacred Defence Week (Sept. 20–27) commemorates the commencement of the Iran–Iraq War.

According to Ali Khamenei, "disabled war veterans are images of the war crimes of big powers who encouraged former Iraqi dictator Saddam Hussein to invade Iran."

== See also ==
- Wounded in action
- Martyr
- Iraqi chemical attacks against Iran
- Az Karkheh ta Rhein, Iranian movie
