= List of Iranian Arabs =

This is a list of Iranian Arab notable people, arranged by main profession and then birthdate. To avoid differences in nomenclature and identity, this list starts from the 16th century (early modern period), When the Safavids established a national state officially known as Persia or Iran and reasserted the Iranian identity of the region.

The identity of Iranian Arab people and their affiliation are different, Arab identity itself is the objective or subjective state of perceiving oneself as an Arab and as relating to being Arab. Their identities, like those of other Iranian cultural and ethnic identities, are based on a common culture-land-historical experience or traditional lineage. Today, these commonalities are generally regional and in the historical-tribal context, as many of them assimilated with the largest ethnic group in Iran, the Persians, and they are not identified except by sub-symbols such as Arabic surnames, including: Bani-Amiri, Asadi, Khazaei, Tamimi, etc., apart from Hashimi nasabs like: Mousavi, Hosseini, Hassani, Alavi, Tabatabai, Sadr, Fatemi, etc. Today, prominent Arab communities in Iran can be clearly seen through national, regional, or local identity. They come from various backgrounds in the scattered regions of present-day or historical Iran and are concentrated, especially in the southwest of the country where the Arabs of Khuzestan live. In the south, prominent groups of them live on the shores and islands of the Persian Gulf in the provinces of Hormozgan, Fars and Bushehr. Khorasan Arabs also live in cities and villages in the east and northeast of the country. Other groups of Iranian Arabs worth mentioning include immigrants to Iran from Arab countries and their descendants, especially from the Mashriq and the Arabian Peninsula, people of Arab tribes descent, naturalized Arab individuals of Iran and other Arab sub-communities settled in Iran or Iranian diaspora in Arab countries who became Arabized.

Among the Arab-affiliated groups and ethnicities in present-day Iran are: Arab-Persians, people of mixed Arab and Persian ethnic or cultural background; Arabic-speaking Afro-Iranians and those who may be called Iranian Afro-Arabs; Assyrians and Mandaeans, both of which are natives of the Middle East and speak a branch of the Semitic languages that are closely related to Arabic, like the Iranian Jews; Iranian diaspora in Arab countries and vice versa, Arab expatriates in Iran who would not be included in the list unless they became permanent residents of Iran or are customarily considered as Iranian; Iranian Arabists etc.

This list is not automatically filled with notables from Arab regions in Iran such as Khuzestan or Hormozgan, but the following people have either stated that they are Arabs or that credible sources indicate that. To be included in this list, the person must have a Wikipedia article and references showing the person is Arab and Iranian.

== Arts and entertainment ==
=== Actors and actresses ===
- Reza Fayazi - (6 July 1953, Ahvaz) director and actor; Khuzestani Arab.
- Osamah Sami - (10 March 1983, Qom) stage and screen actor, writer, spoken word artist, and stand-up comedian; Iran-born Iraqi-Australian.
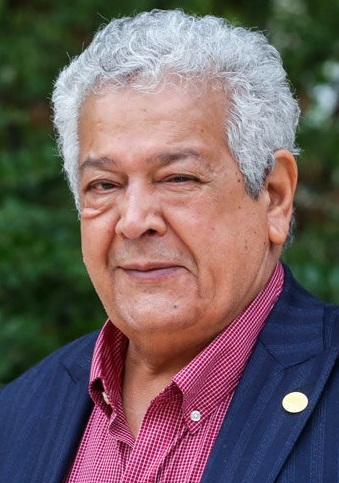
Reza Fayazi
(1953)
Khuzestani Arab

=== Directors ===
- Shahriar Bahrani - (1951, Tehran) director; Iranian of Bahrani descent.
- Mohammad Reza Fartousi - (16 July 1982, Ahvaz) producer, director and screenwriter; Khuzestani Arab.
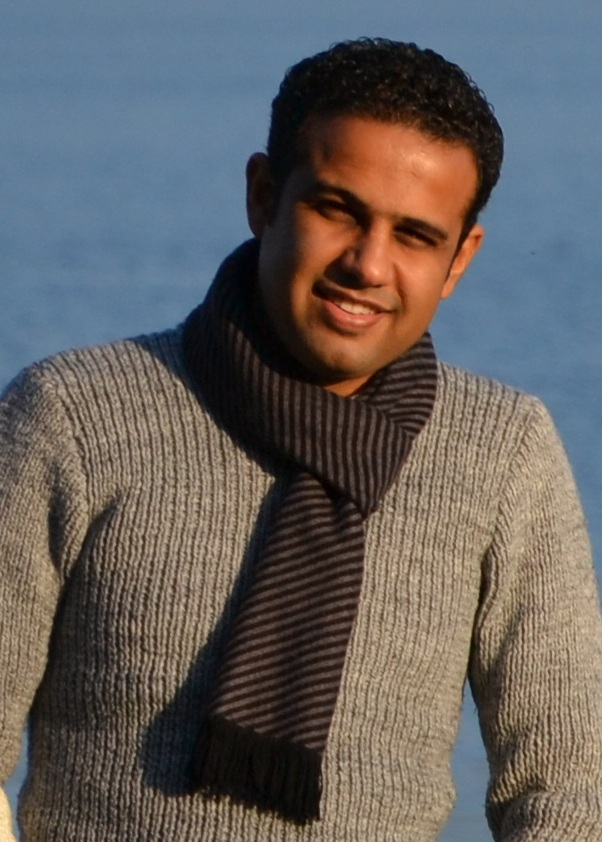
Mohammad-Reza Fartousi
(1982)
Khuzestani Arab

=== Singers and instrumentalists ===
- Mohammad Shahabi - (1962, Ahvaz - 25 December 2015, Mollasani) Santur player; Khuzestani Arab.
- Mehdi Yarrahi - (14 November 1981, Ahvaz) pop singer; Khuzestani Arab.
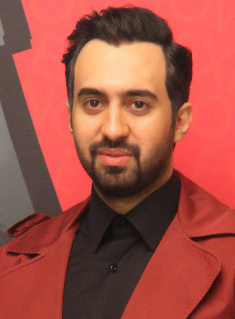
Mehdi Yarrahi
(1981)
Khuzestani Arab

=== Painters and photographers ===
- Jassem Ghazbanpour - (31 May 1963, Khorramshahr) Freelance photographer; Khuzestani Arab.
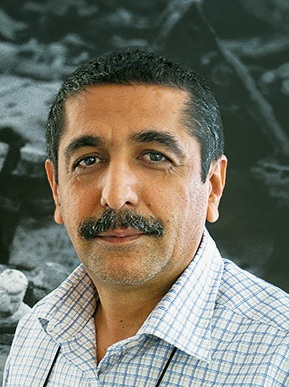
Jassem Ghazbanpour
(1963)
Khuzestani Arab

== Branches of science ==
- Abd al-Hussein al-Salihi - (8 January 1936, Karbala – 15 October 2014, Qazvin) Historian and religious writer; Iranian-Iraqi.
- Yousef Azizi - (21 April 1951, Susangerd) Linguist and historian; Khuzestani Arab.
- Kamal Eleanz - (21 January 1978, Kut-e Abdollah) Theologian and Linguist and philosopher; Khuzestani Arab.
- Adnan Gharifi
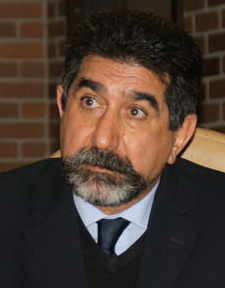
Yousef Azizi
(1951)

== Literature ==
=== Linguists and literary scholars ===
- Amir Mahmud Anvar - (15 November 1945, Tehran – 3 December 2012, Tehran) Iranian literary academic and poet; Musawi in ancestry, descended from Ni'matullah al-Jazayiri.

=== Literary translators ===
- Ghassan Hamdan - (1973, Baghdad) literary translator and poet; Iranian-Iraqi.

== Law and jurisdiction ==
=== Victims ===
- Hashem Shabani - (1982, Ahvaz - 27 January 2014, Ahvaz) Teacher, poet, activist and torture victim; Khuzestani Arab.

== Media ==
=== Journalists ===
- Abbas Khalili - (1896, Najaf – 10 February 1972, Tehran) Journalist, diplomat, poet and novelist; Iranian-Iraqi.
- Hasan Badi' - (1872, Kadhimiya -1937, Tehran) Journalist, writer, poet and diplomat; Iranian-Iraqi.
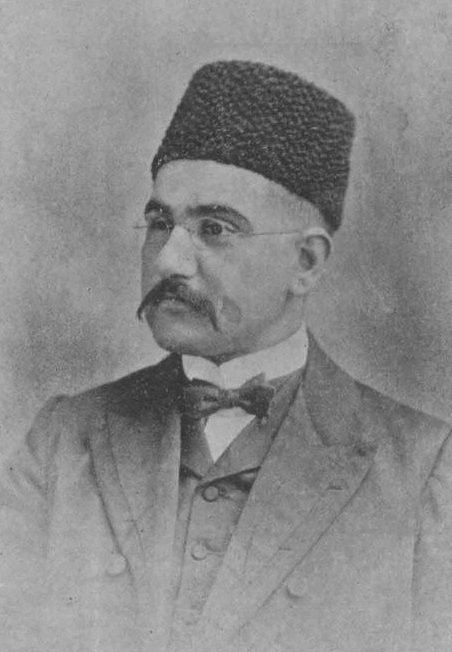
Hasan Badi'
(1872–1937)
Iranian-Iraqi

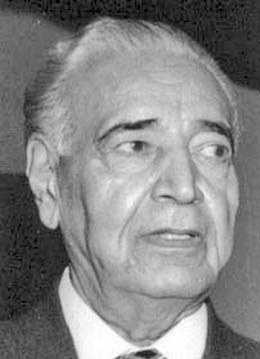
Abbas Khalili
(1896–1972)
Iranian-Iraqi

== Military ==
- Shahriar Shafiq - (15 March 1945, Cairo – 7 December 1979, Paris) Imperial Navy Captain and a member of the House of Pahlavi; Iranian-Egyptian.
- Hamid Taqavi - (1955, Ahvaz – 27 December 2014, Samarra) IRGC commander; Khuzestani Arab.
- Ali Shamkhani - (29 September 1955, Ahvaz – 28 February 2026, Tehran) Navy admiral and IRGC commander; Khuzestani Arab.
- Ali Qasim Hashemi - (31 December 1961, Ahvaz - 25 June 1988, Majnoon Island) IRGC commander; Khuzestani Arab.
- Hassan Danaeifar - (1962, Shushtar) IRGC commander, civil engineer, diplomat and politician; Khuzestani Arab.
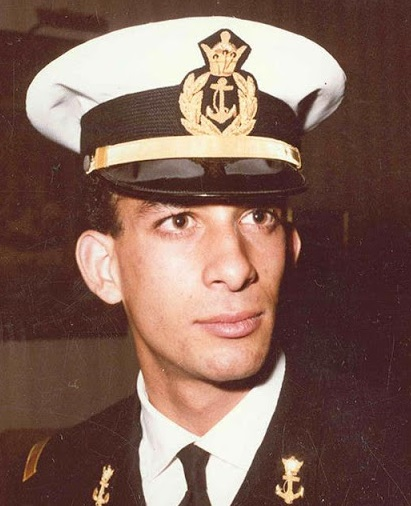
Shahriar Shafiq
(1945–1979)
Iranian-Egyptian

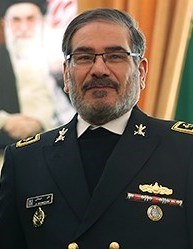
Ali Shamkhani
(1955-2026)
Khuzestani Arab

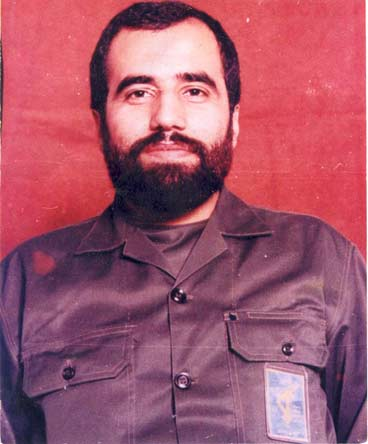
Ali Q. Hashemi
(1961–1988)
Khuzestani Arab

== Politics and government ==
- Hussein al-Shahristani (1942, Karbala) politician; Iraqi of Iranian descent, hails from the al-Shahristani family.
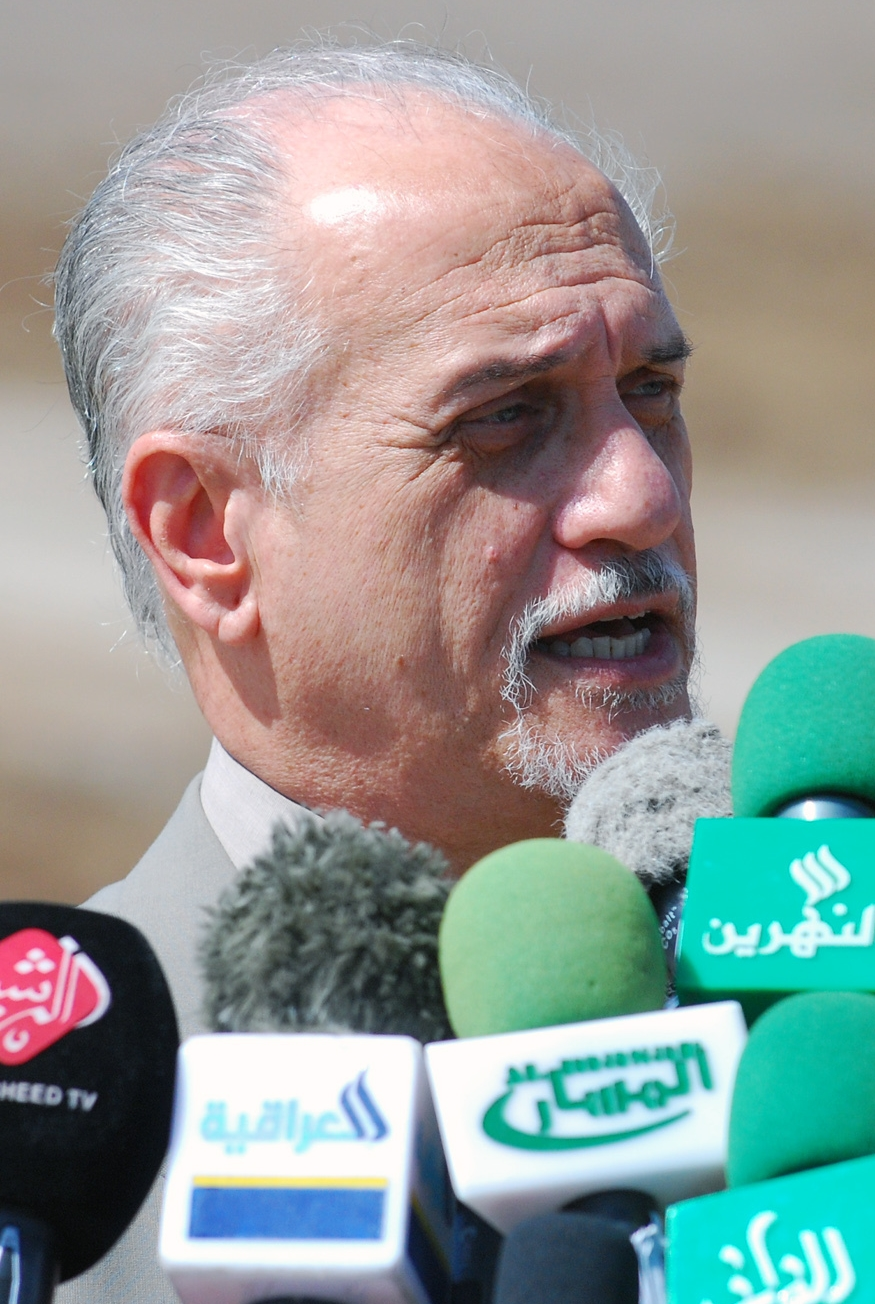
Hussein al-Sharhistani
(1942)
Iranian-Iraqi

=== Emirs ===
- Jabir Ibn Merdaw - (1780 – 1881) Emir of Arabistan; Khuzestani Arab.
- Miz'al ibn Jabir - (18??, Muhammerah – 1897, Muhammerah) Emir of Arabistan; Khuzestani Arab.
- Khazʽal Ibn Jabir - (18 August 1863, Basra – 24 May 1936, Tehran) Sheikh of Mohammerah and Emir of Arabistan; Khuzestani Arab.
- Asadollah Alam - (24 July 1919, Birjand – 14 April 1978, New York) 40th Prime Minister of Iran, Emir of Qa'inat; Khorasani Arab, Persinazed.
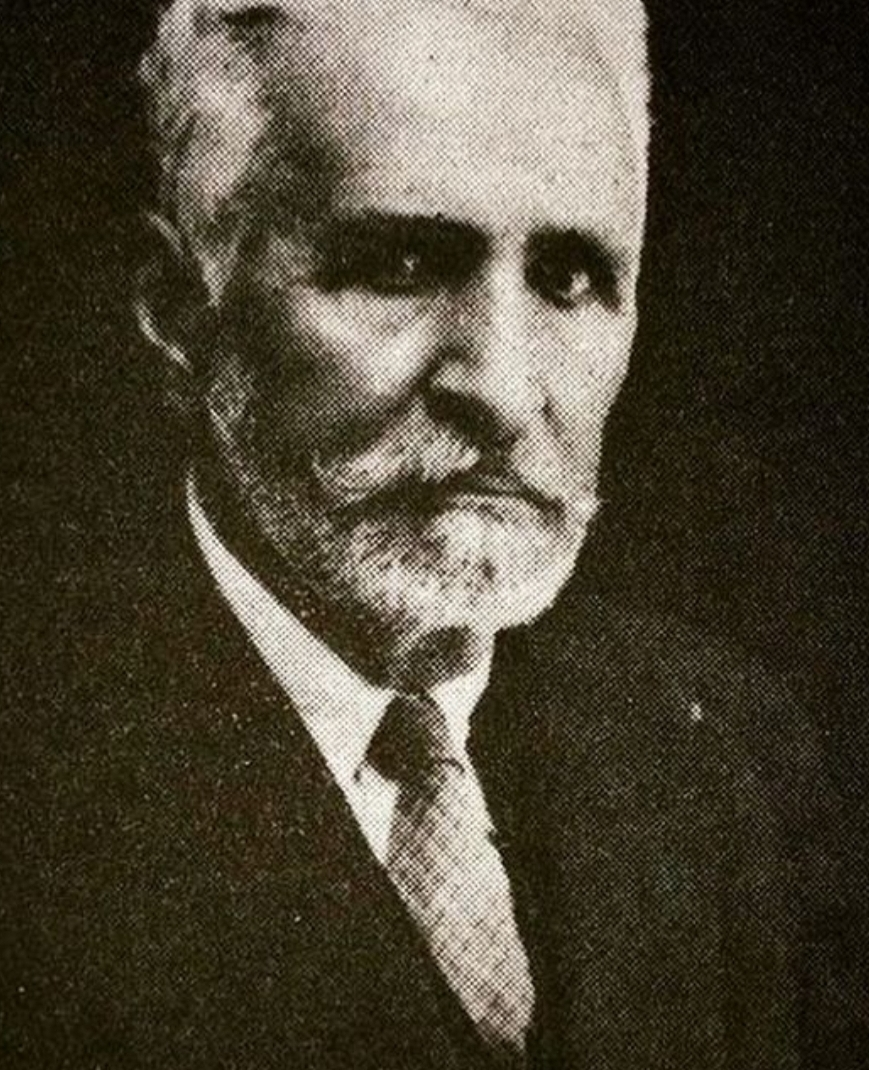
Khazʽal Ibn Jabir
(1861–1936)
Khuzestani Arab

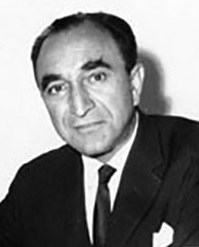
Asadollah Alam
(1919–1978)
Khorasani Arab

=== Diplomats ===
- Mugdaddy Hazoori Vokhshouri - (7 August 1948, Tehran) diplomat and former member of the Jordanian royal family; Iranian-Jordanian.
- Ali Akbar Salehi - (24 March 1949, Karbala) academic, diplomat; Iranian-Iraqi.
- Feisal al-Istrabadi (1962, Virginia) diplomat; Iraqi of Iranian descent, roots in Gorgan, formerly Isterabad.
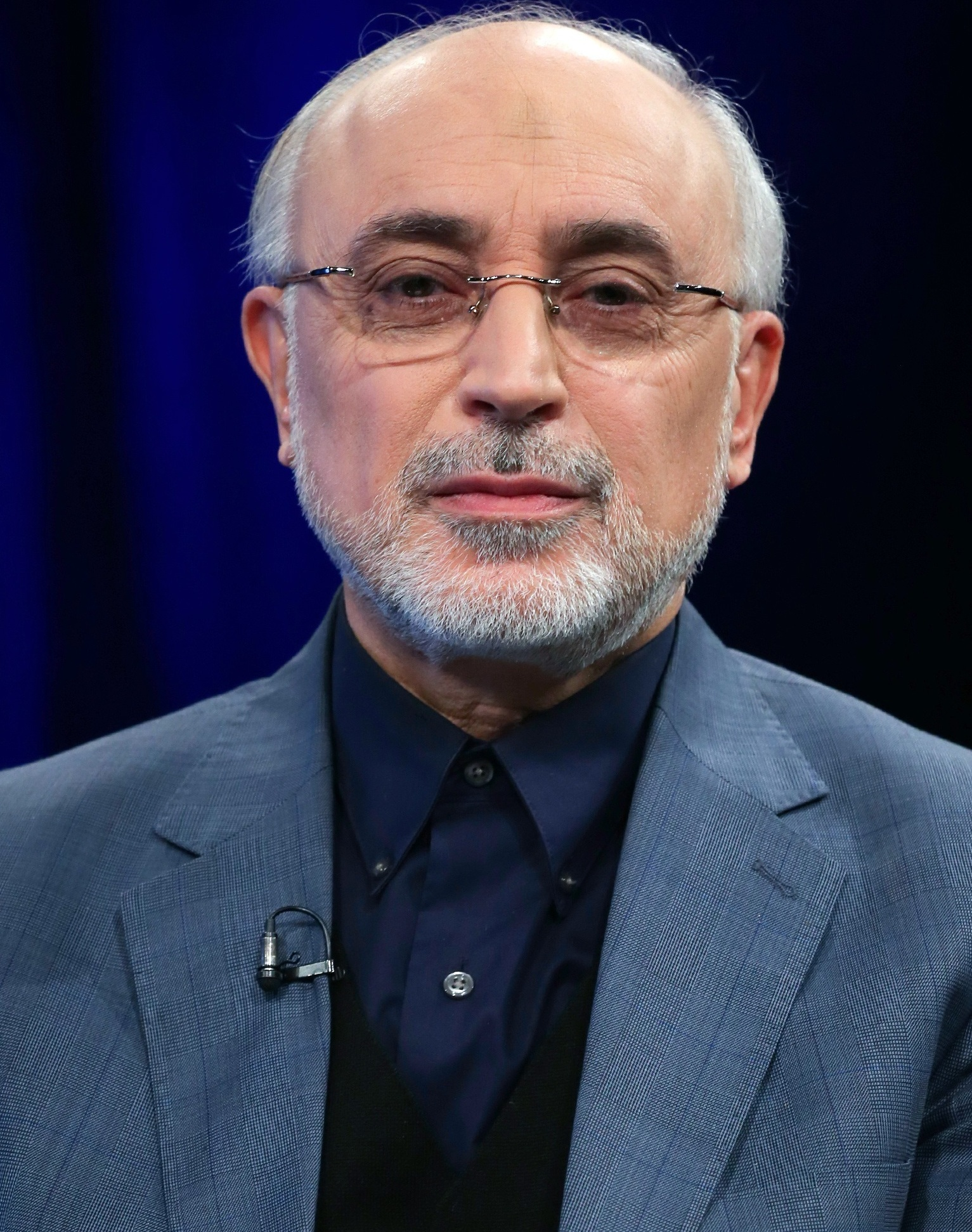
Ali Akbar Salehi
(1949)
Iranian-Iraqi

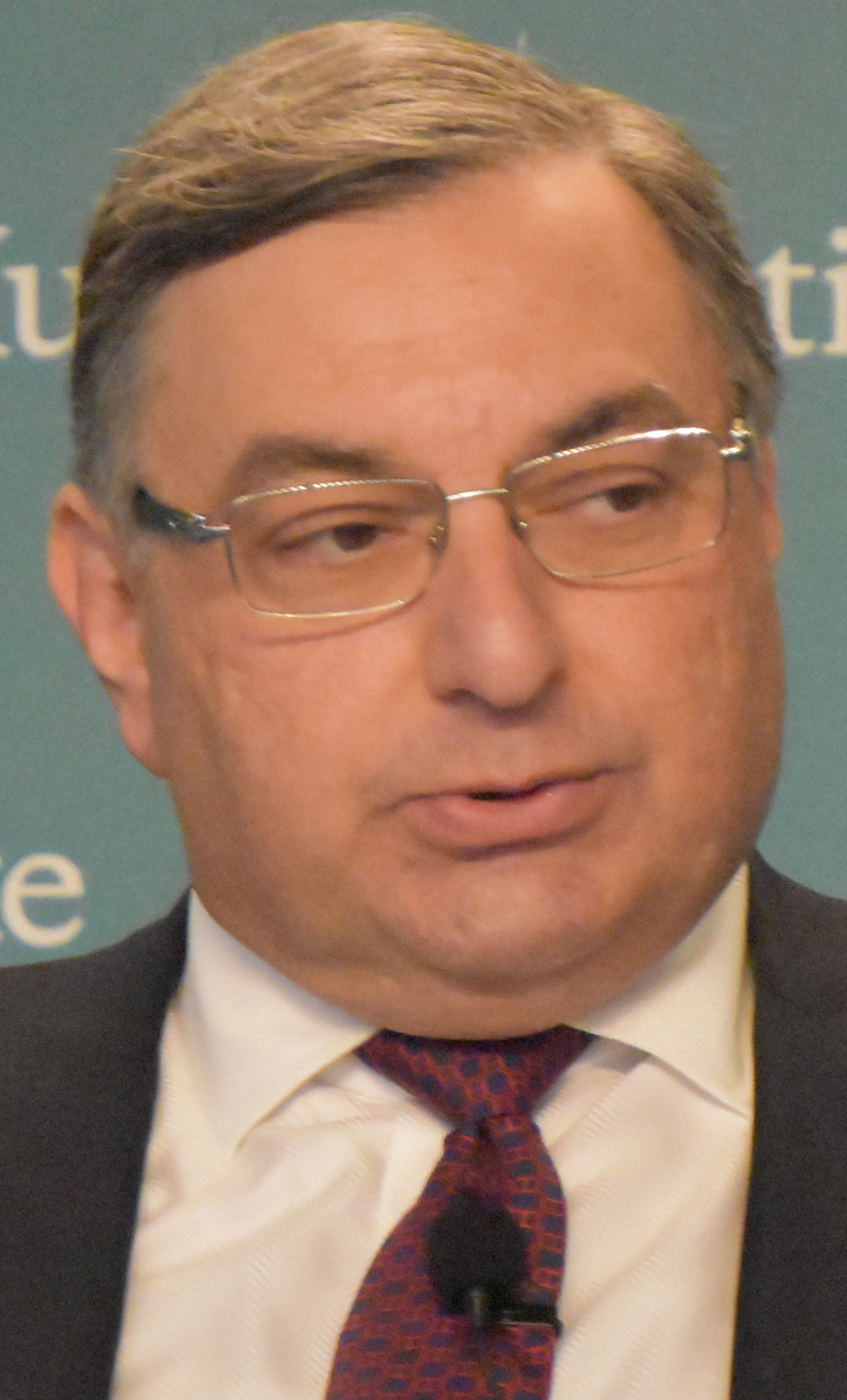
Feisal al-Istrabadi
(1962)
Iranian-Iraqi

=== Members of parliament ===
==== Islamic Consultative Assembly ====
- Jasem Jaderi - (21 March 1957, Susangerd - March 10, 2021, Tehran) reformist politician and executive director, member of the 3rd, 4th and 5th; Khuzestani Arab.
- Shabib Jovijari - (1967, Ahvaz) Member of the 7th, 8th and 11th; Khuzestani Arab.
- Majid Naseri Nejad - (1967, Shadegan) Member of 11th; Khuzestani Arab.
- Karim Hosseini - (1969, Shadegan) Member of 11th; Khuzestani Arab.

==== Assembly of Experts ====
- Muhammad-Ali al-Musawai al-Jazayiri - (1943); Khuzestani Arab.
- Mohammad-Ali Taskhiri - (19 October 1944, Najaf) Ja'fari jurist, diplomat, religious writer and poet; Iranian-Iraqi.
- Muhsin al-Araki - (1956, Najaf) Ja'fari jurist, university lecturer, and politician; Iranian-Iraqi.
- Muhsin Haydari Al Kathir - (1957, Shush) Ja'fari jurist; Khuzestani Arab.
- Abbas Ka'bi - (1962, Ahvaz) Ja'fari jurist; Khuzestani Arab.

=== Political party members ===
- Fowzi Badavi Nejad - (?, Ahvaz) Member of DRFLA.

=== Royal court ===
- Fawzia Fuad of Egypt - (5 November 1921, Alexandria – 2 July 2013, Alexandria) Queen consort of Iran 1941–1948; Naturalized Iranian-Egyptian.
- Shahnaz Pahlavi - (27 October 1940, Tehran) Pahlavi princess; Iranian-Egyptian-Swiss.
- Azadeh Shafiq - (1951, Tehran – 23 February 2011, Paris) Pahlavi princess; Iranian-Egyptian.
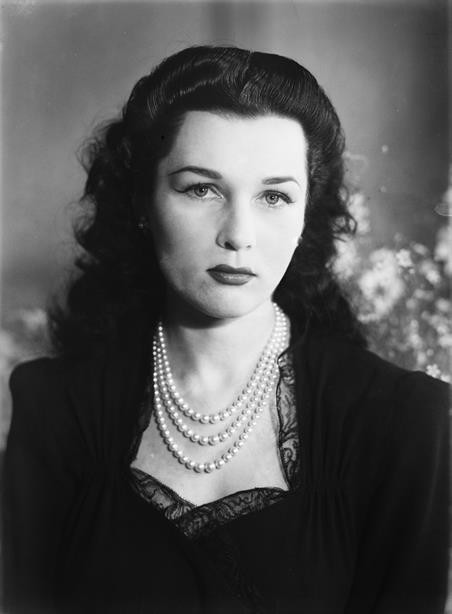
Fawzia
(1921 – 2013)
Iranian-Egyptian

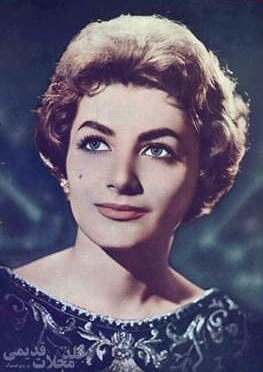
Shahnaz Pahlavi
(1940)
Iranian-Egyptian

== Religion ==
=== Bahá'í figures ===
Iranian Bahá'í figures those related to the Arab world, except Baháʼu'lláh the prophet-founder of Baháʼí Faith, he who spent his exile life from 1863 in Ottoman Iraq and Palestine

- ʻAbdu'l-Bahá - (23 May 1844, Tehran – 28 November 1921, Haifa) Leader of the Baháʼí Faith; Iranian emigrant to the Ottoman Iraq and Palestine.
- Mírzá Abu'l-Faḍl - (July 1844, Golpaygan - 21 January 1914, Cairo) Scholar, religious writer and missioner; Arabized, Iranian Egypt-based.
- Mírzá Mihdí - (1848, Tehran – 23 June 1870, Haifa) Youngest child of Baháʼu'lláh; Ottoman-Palestinian Iranian.
- Mírzá Muhammad ʻAlí - (16 December 1853, Baghdad - 10 December 1937, Haifa) one of the sons of Bahá'u'lláh; Iraq-born Iranian.
- Shoghi Effendi - (1 March 1897, Acre – 4 November 1957, London) Religious leader, Guardian of the Baháʼí Faith from 1921 to 1957; Arabized, Ottoman-Palestinian of Iranian descent.

=== Islamic religious poets and writers ===
- Ahmad bin Ismail al-Jazyiri - (?, Al-Jazayir – 1736, Najaf) Ja'fari jurist, religious teacher and writer; Iranian-Iraqi of Khuzestani Asadi ancestry.
- Ahmad al-Muhsini - (1744, Medina – 1831, Dowraq) Ja'fari jurist, religious and writer and poet; Iranian of Ahsa'i descent.
- Muhammad Taha al-Huwayzi - (1899, Najaf – 4 April 1968, Ahvaz) Ja'fari jurist, religious teacher and poet; Iranian-Iraqi and Khuzestani Arab.
- Muhammad bin Fadlallah al-Sarawi - (?, Pahneh Kola, Sari – May 1924, Najaf) Ja'fari jurist, religious writer and poet; Iranian-Iraqi of Hashemi Musawi ancestry.
- Muhammad-Amin al-Imami al-Khu'i - (1885, Najaf - 1948, Tehran) Ja'fari jurist, religious writer and historian; Iranian Iraqi-born of Asadi ancestry.
- Ibrahim al-Musawi al-Zanjani - (1925, Sain Qaleh, Abhar - 1999, ?) Ja'fari jurist, religious writer and teacher; Iranian-Iraqi of Musawi ancestry.

=== Sufis and Islamic philosophers ===
- Baha' al-din al-'Amili - (18 February 1547, Baalbek – 1 September 1621, Isfahan) Islamic scholar, philosopher, writer and poet; Safavid Iranian.
- Ahmad ibn Zayn al-'Abidin al-Alawi - (circa 1582, Jabal Amil - 1650, Isfahan) Islamic philosopher; Safavid Iranian.

=== Islamic scholars and jurists ===
- Ni'matollah al-Jazayiri - (1640, Al-Sabbaghiyah -1701, Papil) Ja'fari jurist, religious writer and teacher; Safavid Iranian-Iraqi.
- Al-Hurr al-Amili - (1624, Machghara -1693, Mashhad) Ja'fari jurist and qadi; Levantine Arab-Safavid Iranian.
- Nur al-Din Nimatullah al-Jazayiri - (1677, Shushtar - 29 December 1745, Shushtar) Ja'fari jurist, linguist and writer; Safavid Iranian, Khuzestani Arab.
- Kazim Rashti - (1793, Rasht –1 January 1843, Karbala) Ja'fari jurist; Iranian of Hejazi Hashimi descent, then Iranian-Iraqi.
- Murtadha al-Ansari - (13 May 1800, Dezful - 18 November 1864, Najaf) Ja'fari jurist; Khuzestani Arab, then Iranian-Iraqi.
- Abdullah Behbahani - (1840, Najaf - 16 July 1910, Tehran) Ja'fari jurist and a constitutional movement leader; Bahrani Iranian-Iraqi.
- Muhammad Hossein Gharavi - (26 December 1878, Kadhimiya - 13 December 1942, Najaf) Ja'fari jurist, religious writer and poet; Iranian-Iraq.
- Abu al-Qasim al-Khoei - (19 November 1899, Khoy - 8 August 1992, Kufa) Ja'fari jurist and marja'; Iranian-Iraqi.
- Abbas al-Mohri - (1912, Mohri - 15 February 1988, Tehran) Ja'fari jurist; Iranian-Kuwaiti.
- Musa al-Sadr - (4 June 1928, Qom – disappeared 31 August 1978, Libya) Ja'fari jurist and Islamic leader; Iranian-Lebanese.
- Ali al-Sistani - (4 August 1930, Mashhad) Ja'fari jurist and marja'; Iranian-Iraqi.
- Mahmoud Hashemi Shahroudi - (15 August 1948, Najaf – 24 December 2018, Tehran) Ja'fari jurist, qadi and politician; Iranian-Iraqi.
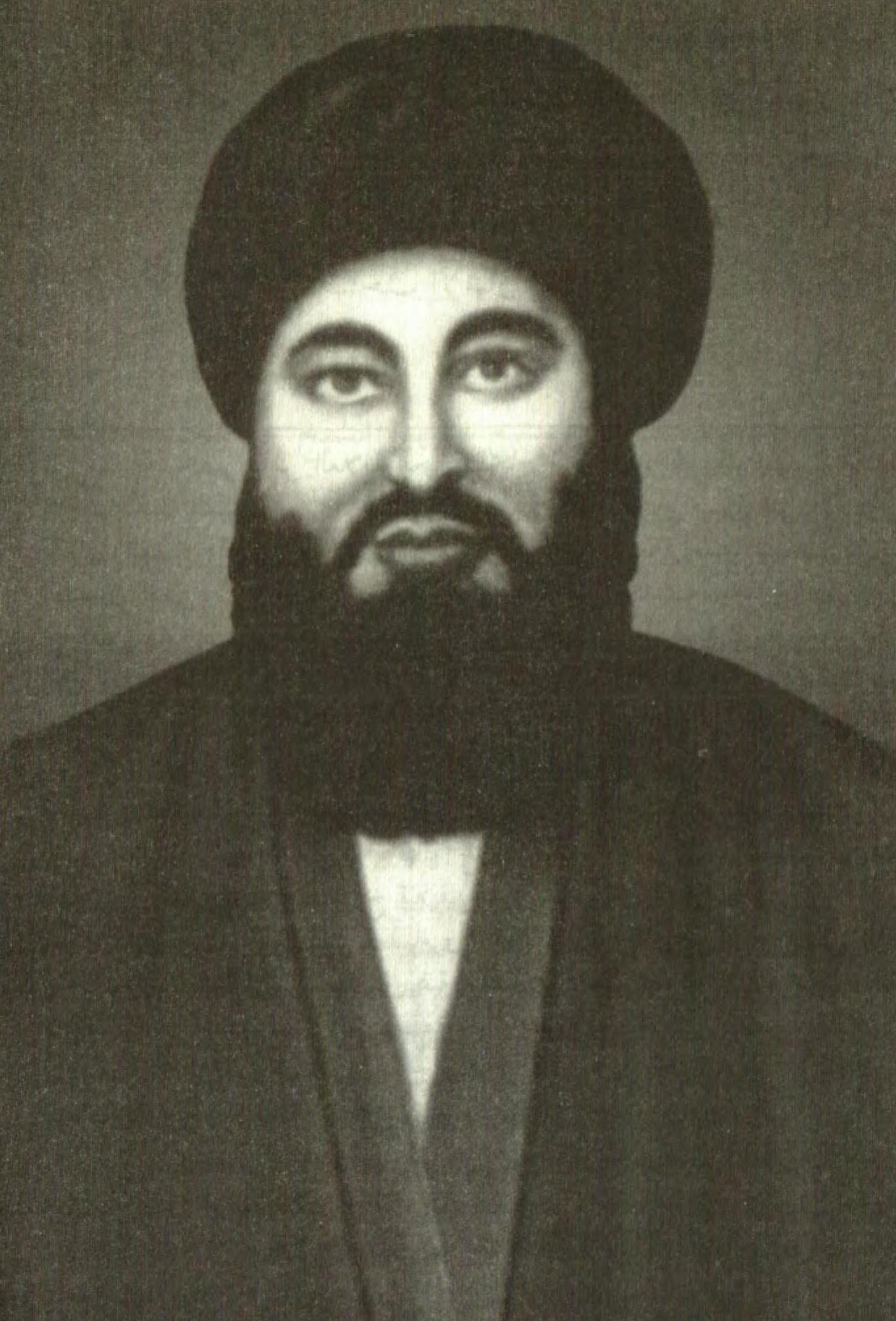
Kazim Rashti
(1793 - 1844)
Iranian-Iraqi

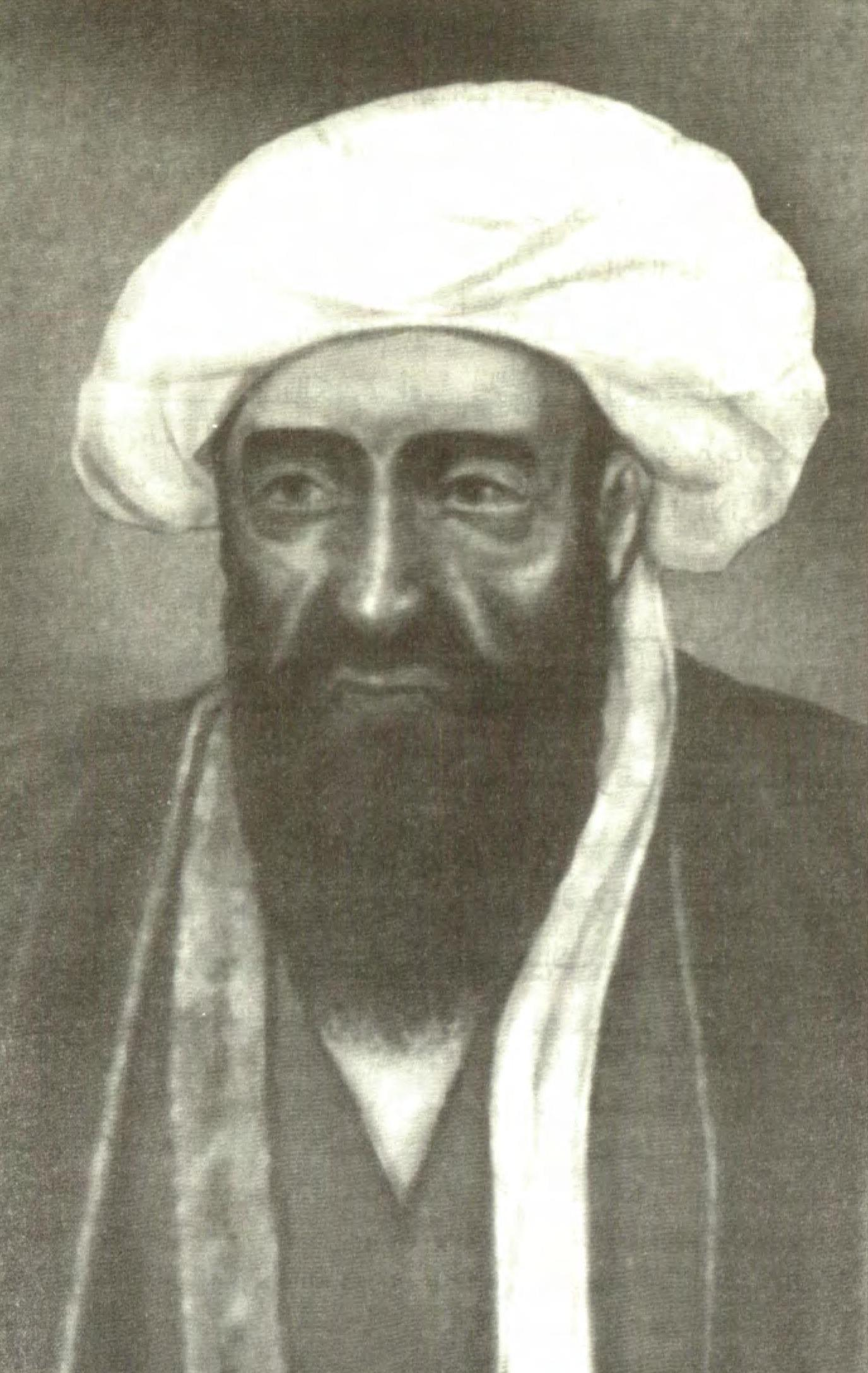
Murtadha al-Ansari
(1800 - 1864)
Khuzestani Arab

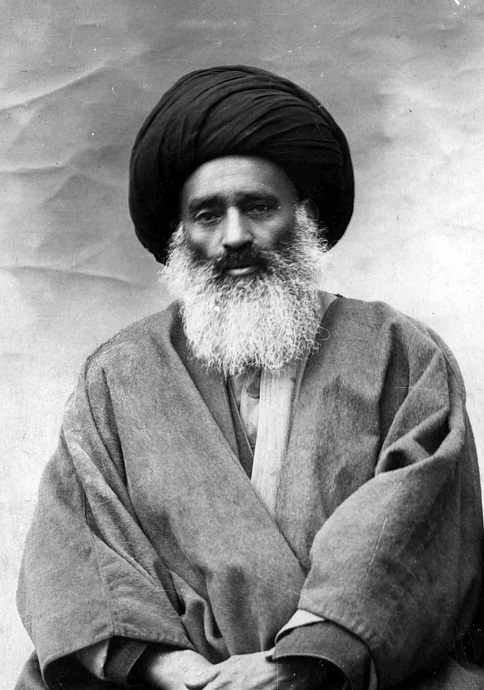
Abdullah Behbahani
(1840 - 1910)
Bahrani Iranian-Iraqi

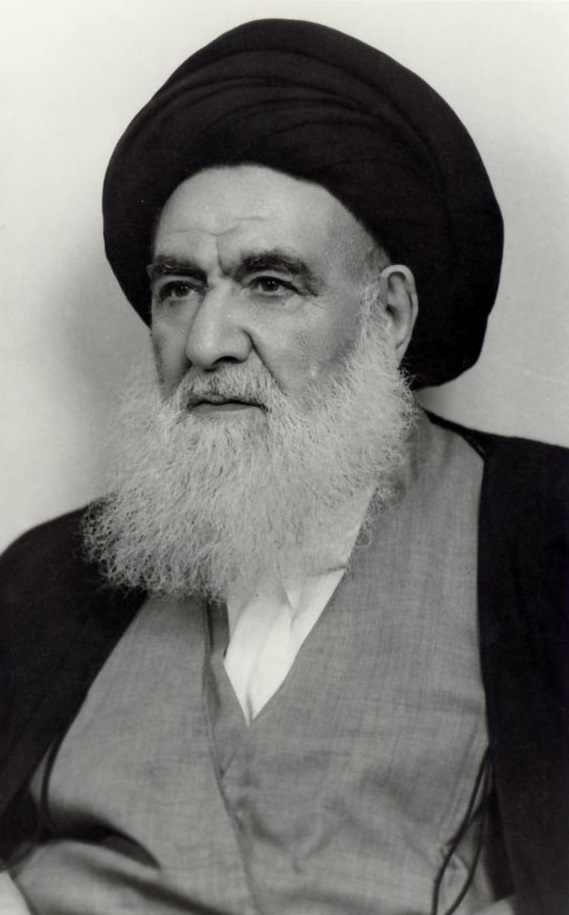
Abu al-Qasim al-Khoei
(1899 - 1992)
Iranian-Iraqi

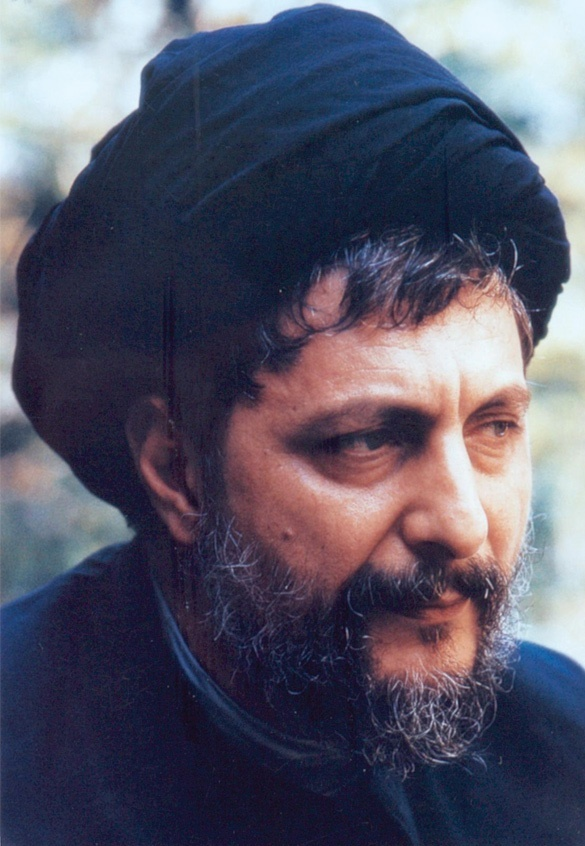
Musa al-Sadr
(1928 - ~ 1978)
Iranian-Lebanese

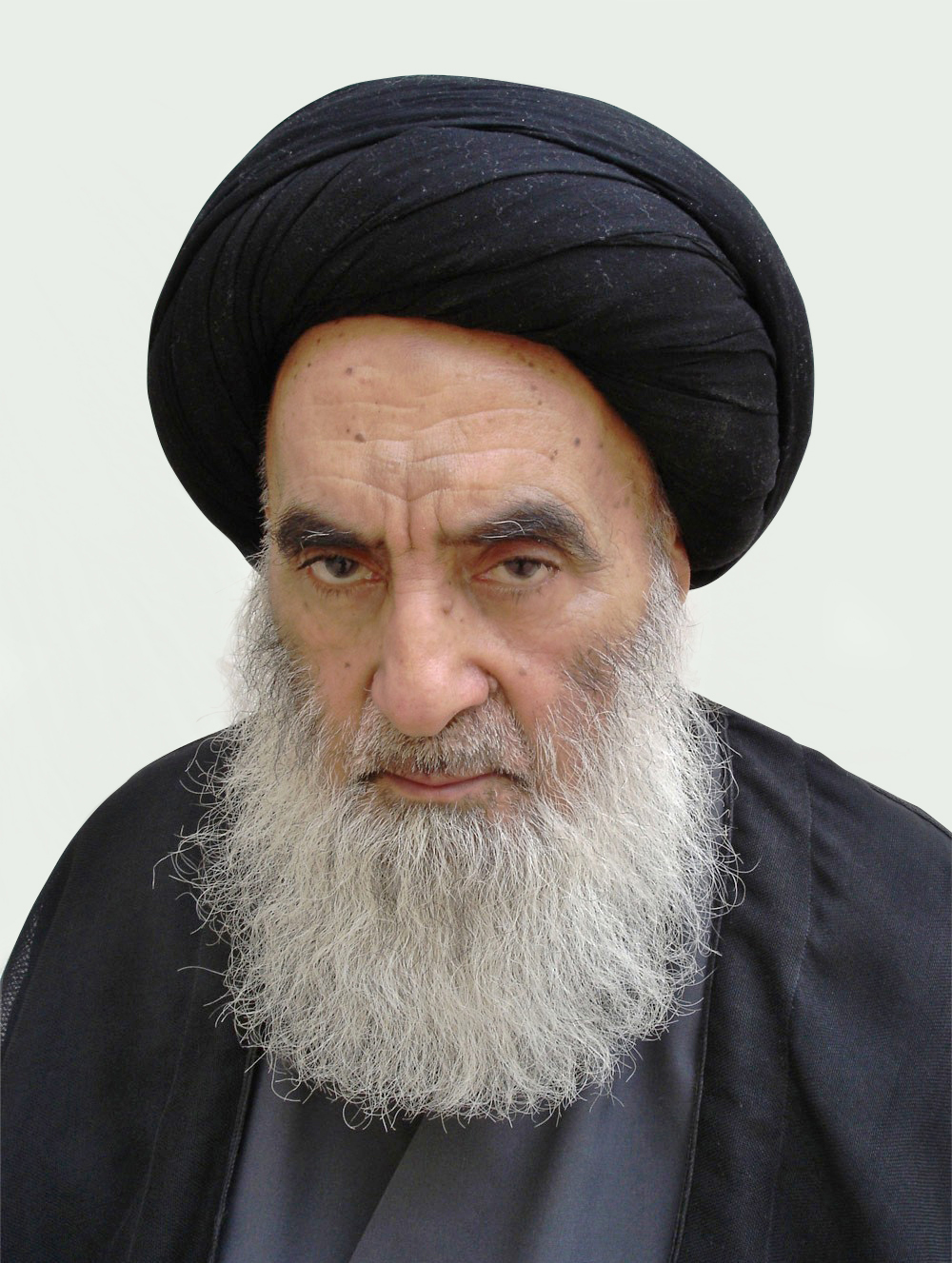
Ali al-Sistani
(1930)
Iranian-Iraqi

== Sports ==
=== Athletes ===
- Javad Hardani - (22 March 1984, Ahvaz) Paralympic athlete; Khuzestani Arab.
- Hashemiyeh Motaghian - (22 May 1986, Ahvaz) Paralympic athlete; Khuzestani Arab.
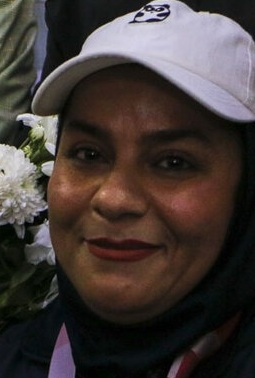
Hashemiyeh Motaghian
(1986)
Khuzestani Arab

=== Basketball players ===
- Ali Doraghi - (20 September 1984, Ahvaz) basketball player; Khuzestani Arab.
- Hamed Haddadi - (19 May 1985, Ahvaz) basketball player; Khuzestani Arab.
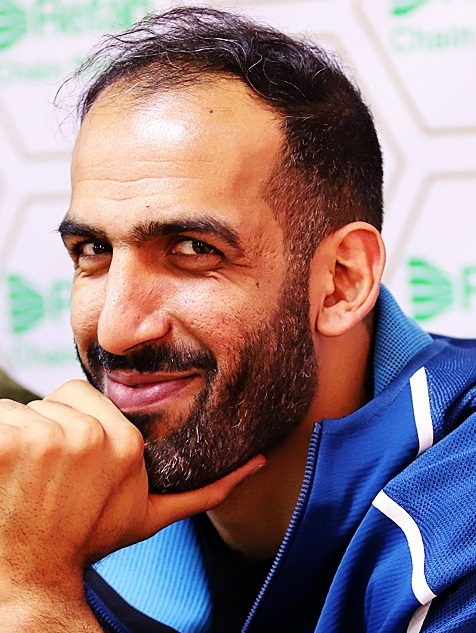
Hamed Haddadi
(1985)
Khuzestani Arab

=== Football players ===
- Karim Bavi - (30 December 1964, Abadan) Striker, retired; Khuzestani Arab.
- Ebrahim Tahami - (21 September 1966, Abadan) Midfielder, retired; Khuzestani Arab.
- Laith Nobari - (23 September 1977, Baghdad) Forward, retired; Iranian-Iraqi.
- Jalal Kameli Mofrad - (15 May 1981, Shadegan) Centre-back; Khuzestani Arab.
- Ali Badavi - (20 June 1982, Ahvaz) Defender; Khuzestani Arab.
- Ahmad Alenemeh - (20 October 1982, Ahvaz) Defender; Khuzestani Arab.
- Hossein Kaebi - (23 September 1985, Ahvaz) Right back retired; Khuzestani Arab.
- Hossein Mahini - (16 September 1986, Bushehr) Full back, Defensive Midfielder; Khuzestani Arab.
- Issa Alekasir - (7 February 1990, Dezful) Striker; Khuzestani Arab.
- Saeed Hallafi - (20 May 1990, Ahvaz) Deep-lying Forward, Winger; Khuzestani Arab.
- Rahim Zahivi - (19 August 1987, Susangerd) Forward; Khuzestani Arab.
- Mehdi Zobeydi - (30 November 1991, Susangerd) Midfielder; Khuzestani Arab.
- Abbas Bouazar - (8 July 1992, Ahvaz) Attacking midfielder;Khuzestani Arab-Lur.
- Hassan Beyt Saeed - (1 April 1990, Ahvaz) Forward; Khuzestani Arab.
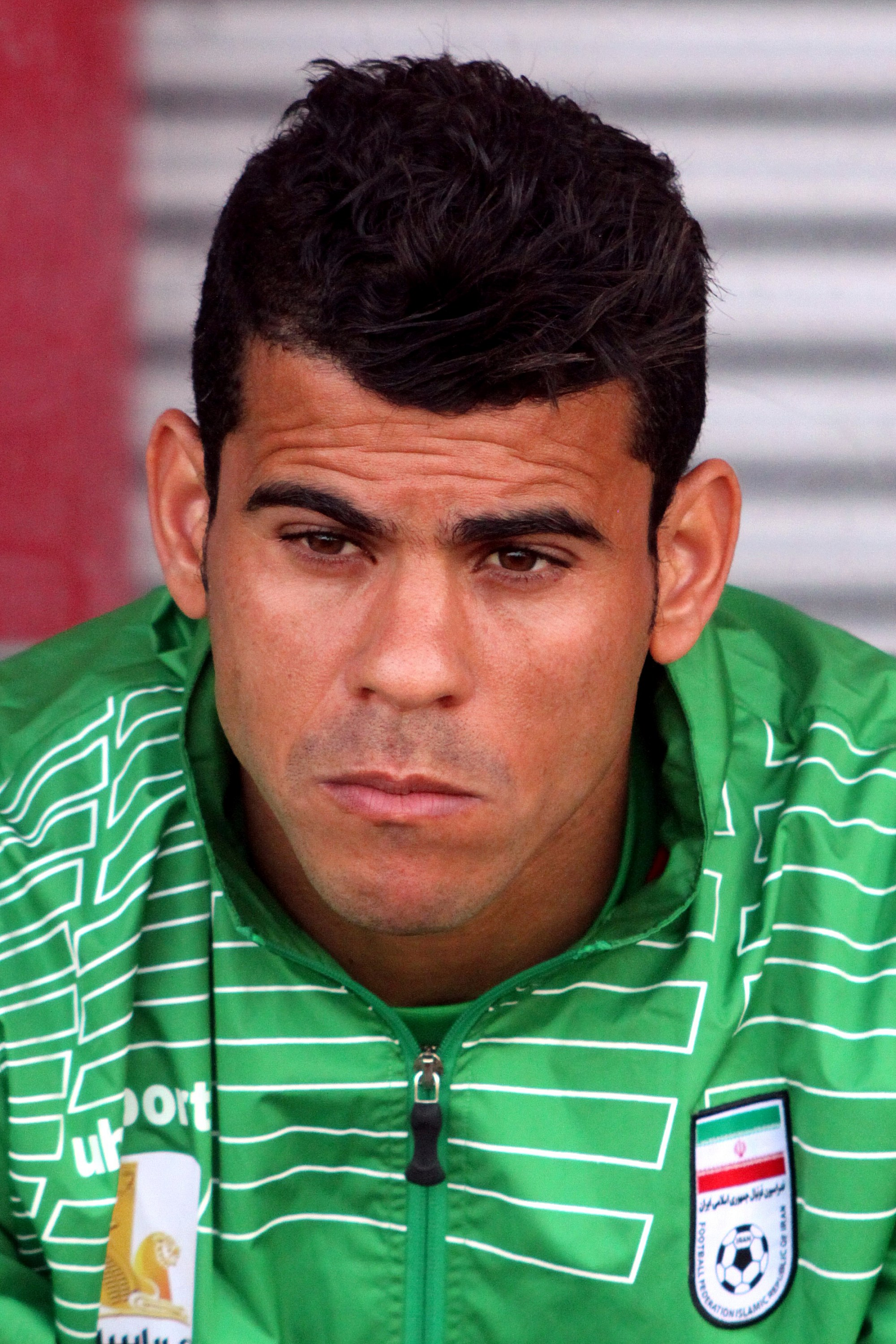
Ahmad Al Ni'mah
(1982)
Khuzestani Arab

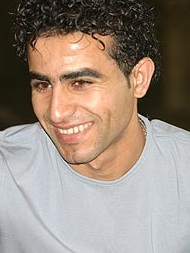
Hossein Ka'bi
(1985)
Khuzestani Arab

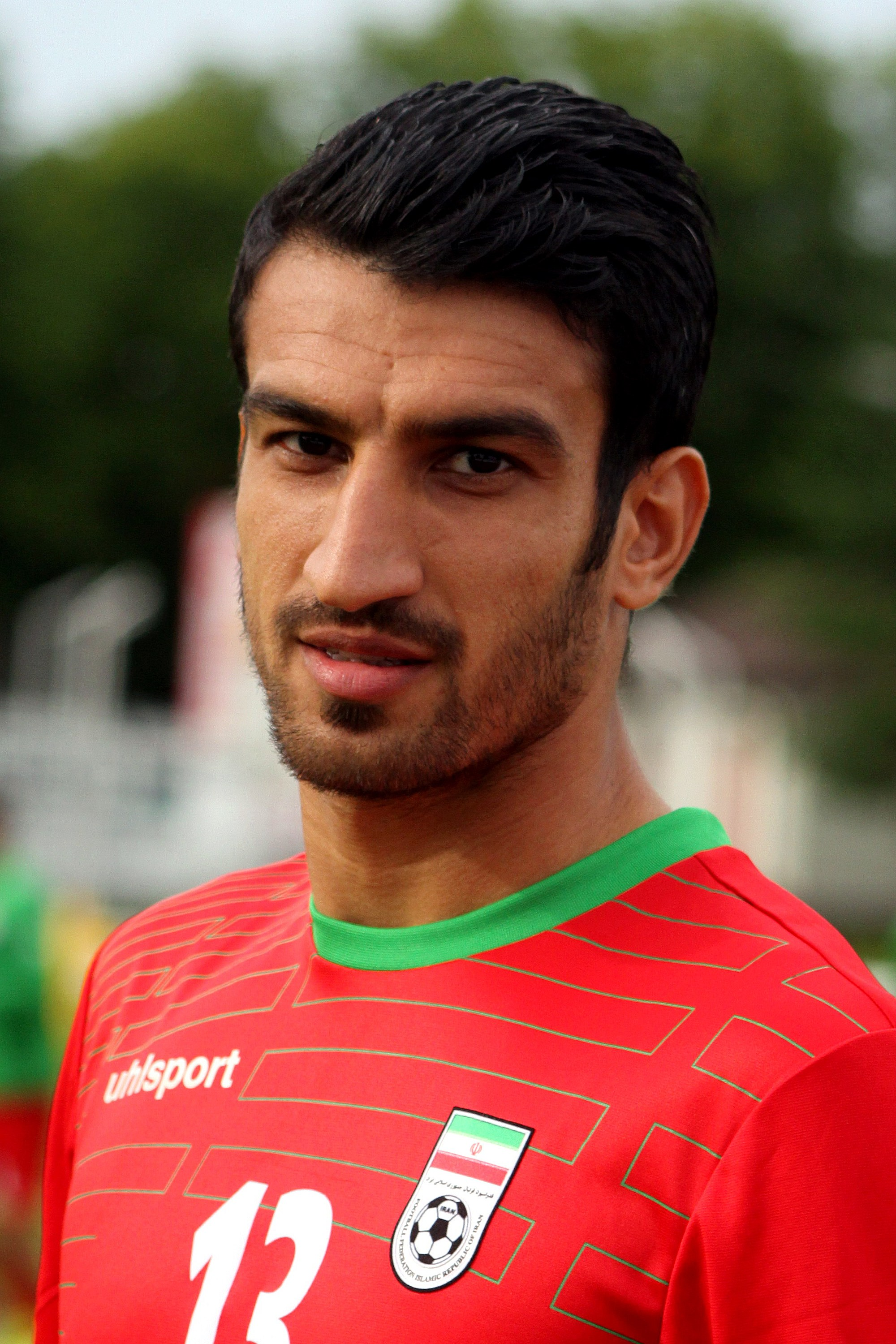
Hossein Mahini
(1986)
Bushehri Arab

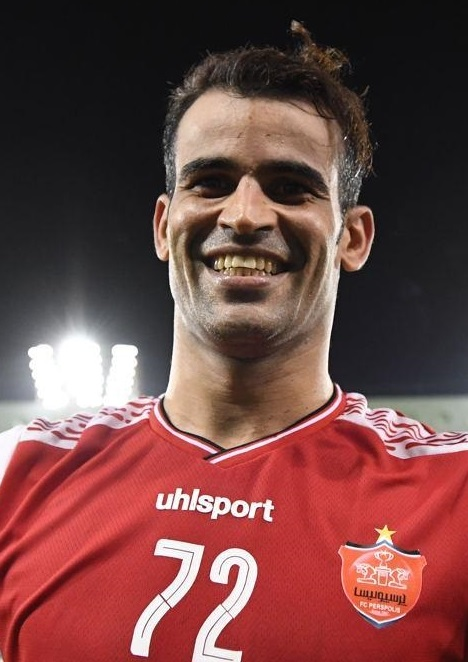
Isa Al Kathir
(1990)
Khuzestani Arab

== See also ==
- list of Iranians
- list of Iranian Assyrians
