= Khuzestani Arabs =

Arab ethnic minority in Iran

عرب خوزستان
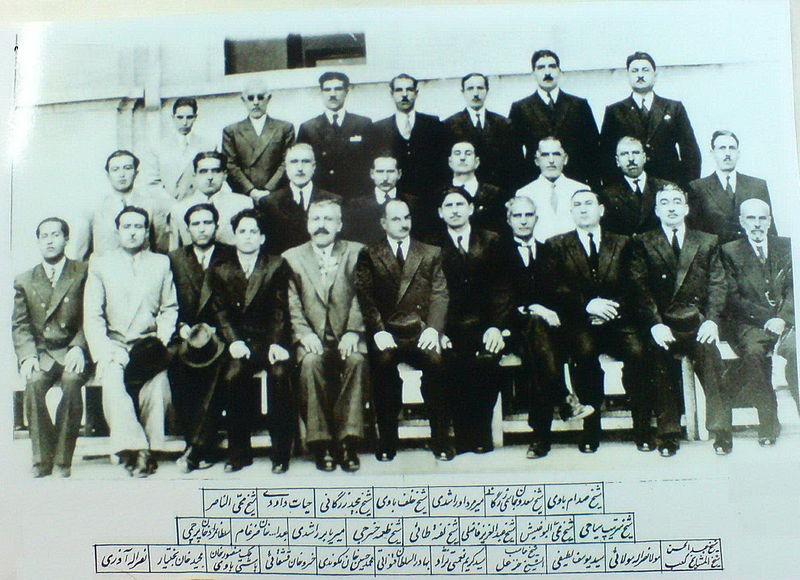
- Ahwazi Sheikhs Autumn 1948

Total population
- 1,600,000 or c. 2,000,000–3,000,000

Regions with significant populations
- Khuzestan province, Iran

Languages
- Khuzestani Arabic, Persian

Religion
- Predominantly Shia Islam

Related ethnic groups
- Baharnah • Huwala Arabs

Ahwazi Arabs or Khuzestani Arabs (Arabic: عرب الأحواز) are the Arab inhabitants of the Khuzestan province and the largest Arabic-speaking community in Iran which primarily reside in the southern half of Khuzestan.

As of 2010, Khuzestani Arabs numbered around 1.6 million people according to Bahrani and Modarresi Ghavami. According to Bettina Leitner (2022): "Although no official numbers exist, it has been estimated that around 2 to 3 million people of the inhabitants of Khuzestan are Arabs. Yet it is hard to determine, what percentage of this population uses Arabic actively." Iran Atlas (2024) estimates around 1.6 million Arabic speakers in Khuzestan, noting that its data does not account for ethnicity or multilingualism.

== History ==
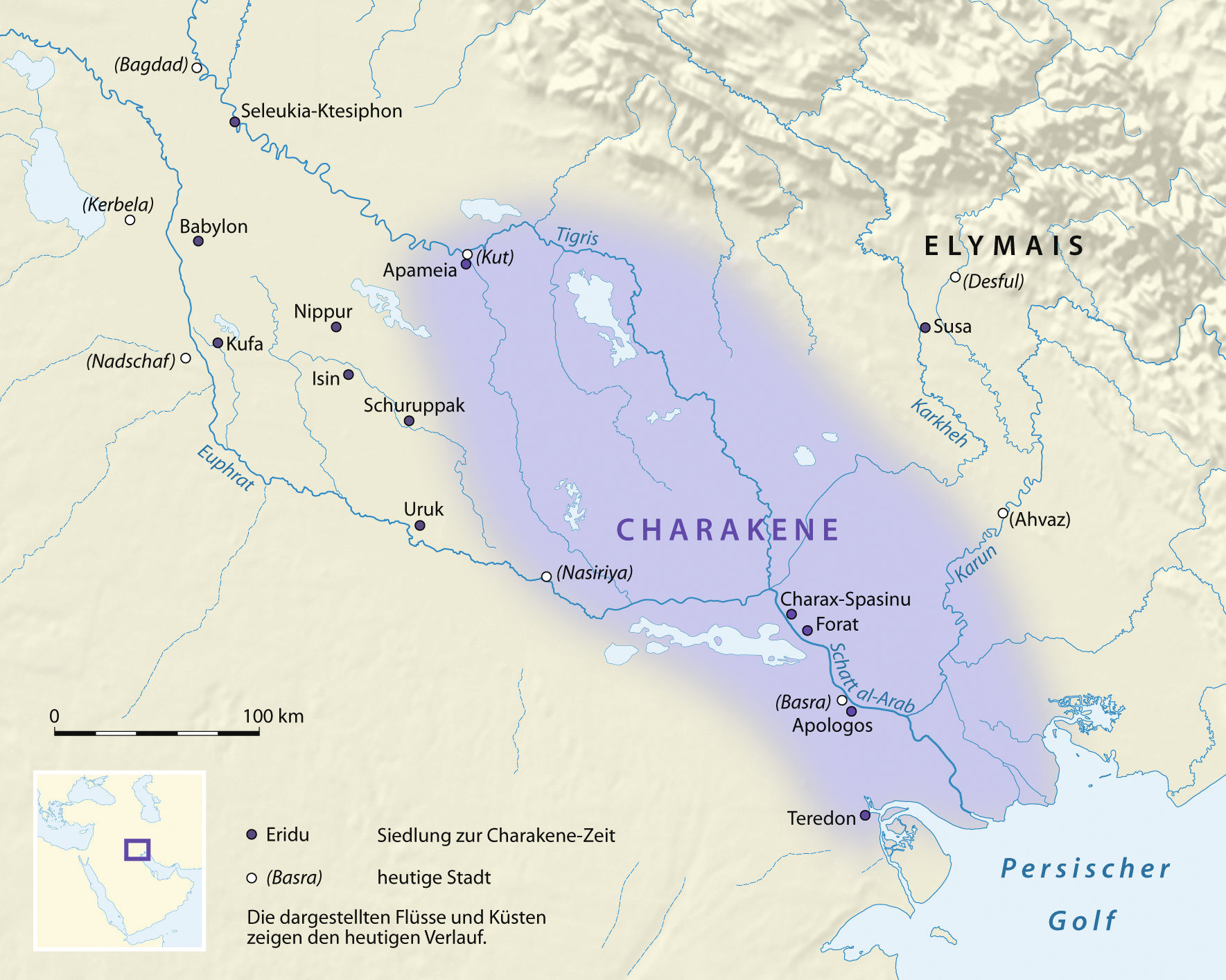
The Kingdom of Characene encompasses the western regions of present-day Khuzestan and the south eastern regions of Iraq

According to Encyclopedia Iranica, the Arab presence in Khuzestan dates back to centuries before the Common Era. During the Kingdom of Characene, established in Khuzestan around 129 BCE after the decline of the Seleucid Empire, the region known as Characene was home to a predominantly Arab population. The kingdom was ruled by Hyspaosines, who was referred to as the king of the Arabs of that area. According to Iranian Scholars, including Ahmad Kasravi, Iraj Afshar Sistani and Javad Mashkour, referring to the historical account of al-Tabari during the Parthian era, the Sasanian monarch Ardashir I sought the assistance of Arab tribes in Khuzestan (Banu al-'Am) in his military campaigns against the Parthians leading to the defeat and eventual downfall of Ardavan, the last king of the Parthian Empire.

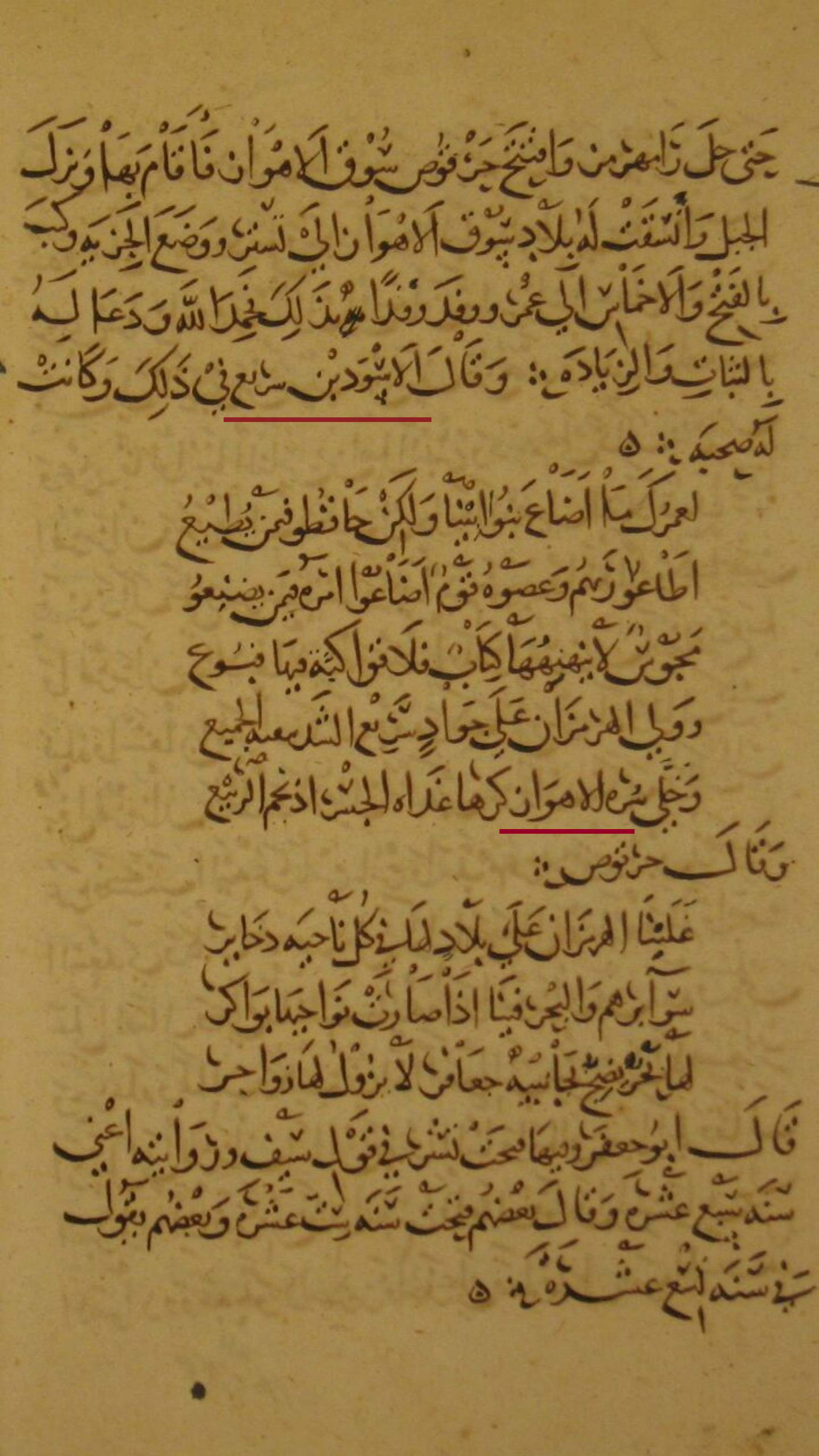
Folio from Tarikh al-Tabari (History of the Prophets and Kings) recording Muslim commander Aswad bin Sari's poem praising Ahwazi Arabs for their role in defeating Hurmozan in Souq al-Ahwaz battle

During the Islamic conquests in 638 CE, according to Muslim scholars such as al-Tabari and Ibn al-Athir, local Ahwazi Arab tribes already present in Khuzestan supported the Muslim armies against the Persian forces. Their involvement was extremely helpful to the Muslim Army leading to the defeat of the Sasanian commander Hormuzan and the subsequent muslim control of the region.

Since the 16th century, Khuzestan was slowly becoming arabized, due to new Arab settlers arriving from Mesopotamia, such as the Banu Ka'b. Due to influx of Shia Arab tribes invited by the Safavids to act as a bulwark against the Ottoman Empire, the western part of Khuzestan became known as Arabestan. According to the Iranologist Rudi Matthee, this name change took place during the reign of Shah Abbas I (r. 1588–1629). (Note: Other modern historians—such as P. Luft and E.J. van Donzel—also only considers Arabestan to have been used for the western part of Khuzestan during this period. The Iranologist Willem Floor includes both Arabestan and Khuzestan separately amongst the jurisdictions of the Safavid realm.) Like the provinces of Kurdistan and Lorestan, the name of Arabestan did not have a "national" implication.

Later on, the whole Khuzestan province came to be known as Arabestan. It is uncertain when this change occurred. According to Rudi Matthee, it was first during the reign of the Afsharid ruler Nader Shah (r. 1736–1747), that this happened. The Iranologist Houchang Chehabi considers this to have taken place in the second half of the 18th century.

Another Iranologist, Roger Savory, considers this change to have happened later, by the Qajar era. The name was reverted back to Khuzestan by Reza Shah in 1925 under his campaign which included the central government ordering the change of names of many cities and towns during the 1930s; these orders changed names of many towns from their native names to Persianized names, to the new name of Reza Khan, naming himself Pahlavi in honor of the Pahlavi scripts, and changing names to historical Persian names which included changing names of Arab towns to Persian ones to encourage the Arab identification with the Iranian nation, especially after the collapse of Arab autonomy in Iran.

The ancient port city in Khuzestan, known as the Emirate of Muhammara, which was autonomously ruled Khazʽal Ibn Jabir, was renamed from its Arabic name after the sheikh was driven out and his oil lands were confiscated by the government.

Reza Shah discouraged the usage of Arabic in the state and also relocated tribes to elsewhere in the province.

Hamid Ahmadi noted that the Arabs of Khuzestan Province are direct descendants of the ancient non-Arab population of the area, having adopted the Arabic language and identity with the spread of Islam, although there are numerous immigrant Arab tribes of Khuzestan with origins from the Arabian Peninsula, such as the Banu Ka'b at Dawraq, the later Fallāhīya and present-day Shadegan, the Musha'sha' at Hoveyzeh, Banu Tamim, and more from southern Iraq.

== Language ==
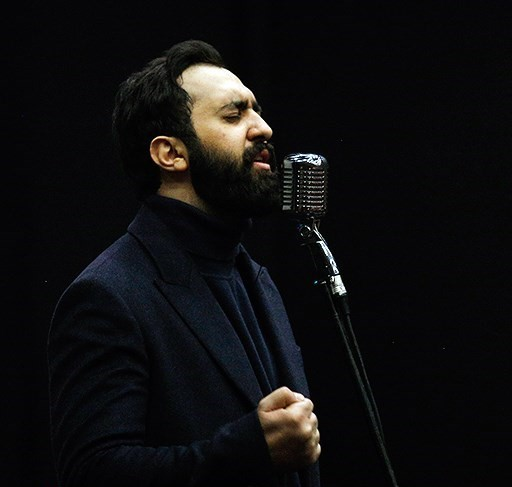
Mehdi Yerrahi, a Khouzestani Arab singer who sings in both Arabic and Persian

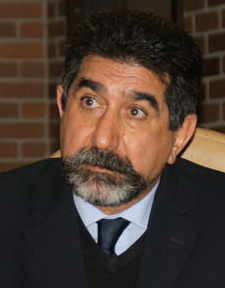
Yousef Azizi (Bani-Torof), a Khouzestani Arab journalist

Nearly all Khuzestani Arabs are bilingual, speaking both Arabic and Persian (the official language of the country). In the northern and eastern cities of Khuzestan, Luri is spoken in addition to Persian, and the Arabic of the Kamari Arabs of this region is "remarkably influenced" by Luri.

== Geography ==
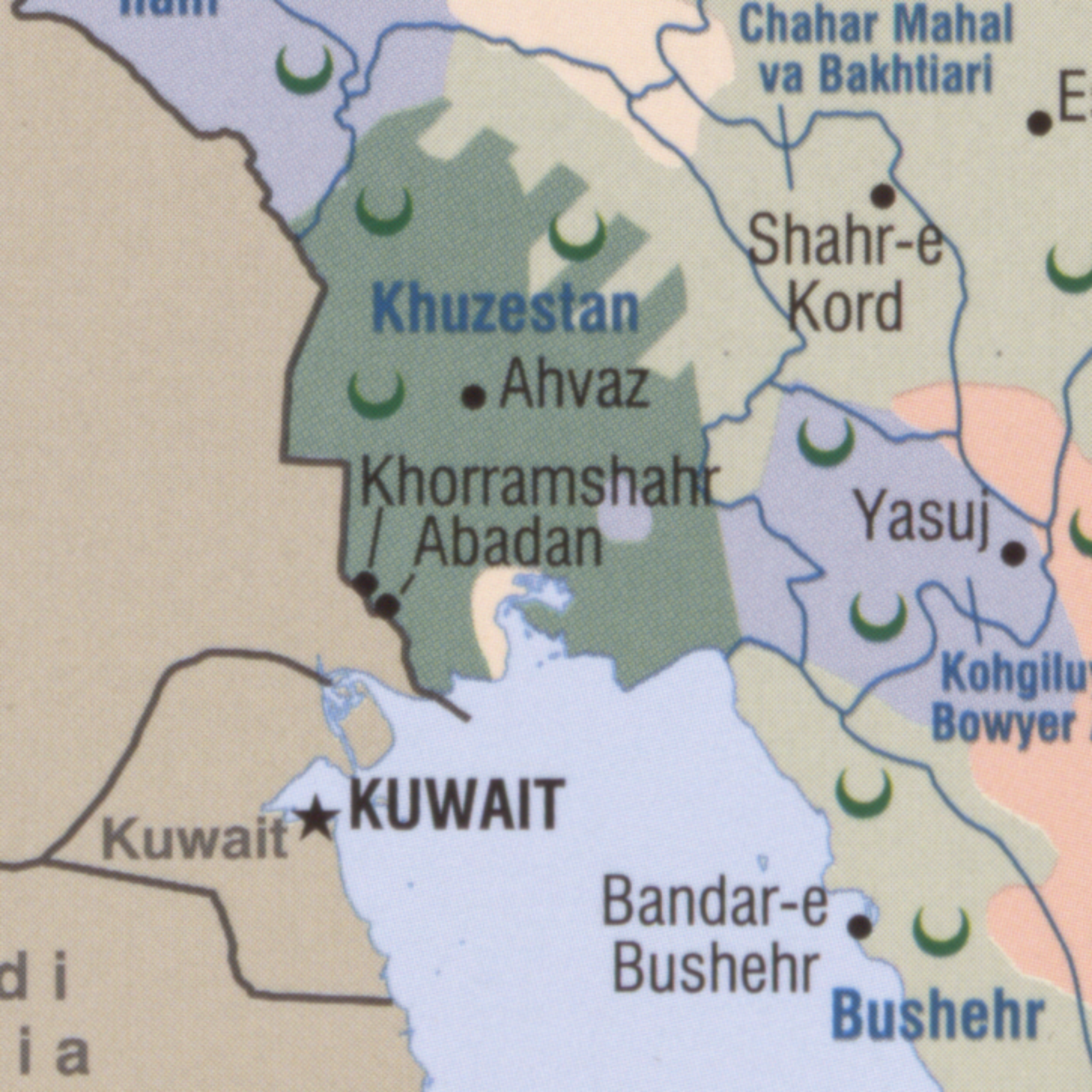
Ethnographic map of Khuzestan by the United States Central Intelligence Agency (2009), showing Arabs in green as the dominant ethnic group in the Khuzestan.

Arabic speakers are estimated to be scattered through 65% of the area of Khuzestan Province, which they share with Lurs, Bakhtiaris, Kowlis and Persian-speakers. Cities that have significant Arabic speaking population include Ahvaz, Khorramshahr, Abadan, Shadegan, Hoveyzeh and Susangerd.

== Demographics ==
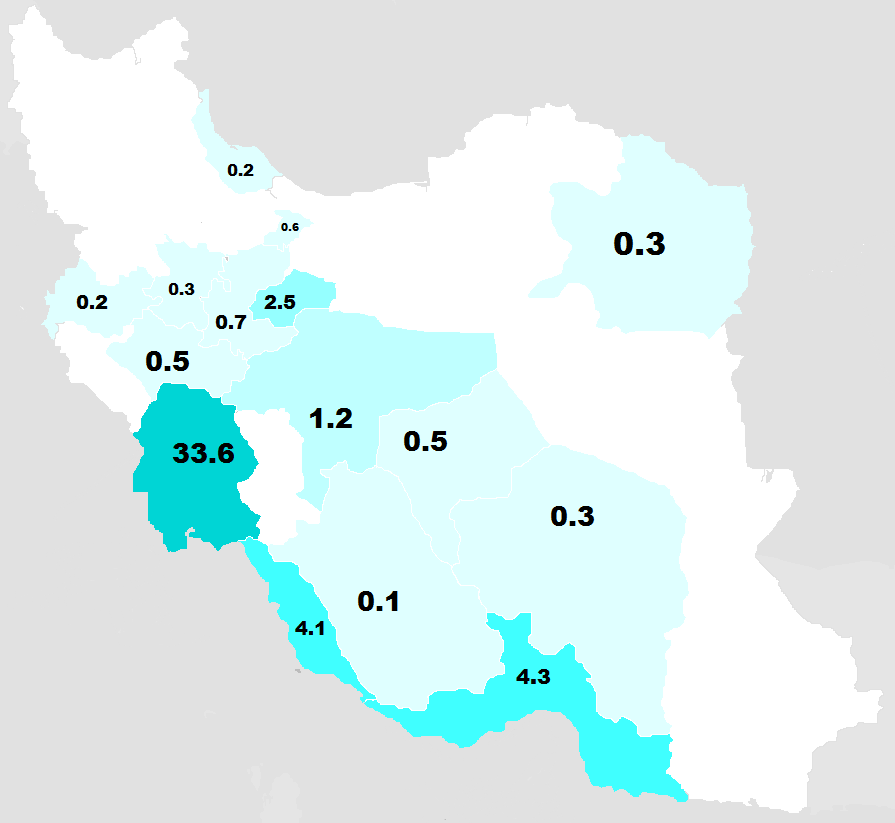
A 2010 survey found that Arabs constitute 33.6% of the population in Khuzestan Province, the largest nationwide

Shahbaz Shahnavaz noted that the Arabic speaking population in Khuzestan is "a hybrid race with a considerable infusion of Persian blood", and observed that "as a result of generations of contacts, the Arabs of Khuzestan had more in common with their fellow Persian countrymen than with their brethren across the border in the Ottoman territory". He wrote that Arabs in Khuzestan had adopted Iranian customs, manners, ceremonious occasions, and even dress (with the exception of headgear).

=== Religion ===
While the majority of Arabs in Khuzestan follow the Shia branch of Islam, there are also a few Sunni Muslims, Christians, Jews and Mandaeans.

=== Tribes ===
Tribalism is a significant characteristic of Arab population in Khuzestan. Although tribal bonds have been weakened during the 20th century, it is still regarded important. Social units among Khuzestani Arabs include beyt (household or group of families), hamule (clan), 'ashire (tribe), as well as tayefe and qabile (tribal confederacies).

According to John Gordon Lorimer, the most important Arab tribes at the turn of the 20th century were:

Transliterated name	Name in Arabic	Territory	Estimated population (1908)
Āl-e Kaṯīr	آل کثیر	Between Karkheh and Karun	8,000
Banū Lām	بنی لام	Between Karkheh and Iraq border	45,000
ʿAbd-al-Ḵān	عبدالخان	Near Kheyrabad on Karkheh	Unknown
Salāmāt	سلامة	East of Gargar between Ab Gonji and Haddam	1,600
Bayt-e Saʿd	بیت سعد	Both banks of Dez	14,100
ʿAnāfeǰa	عنافجة	Both banks of Dez, right bank of Karun	5,000
Ḥamayd	حمید	south of the territory of the ʿAnāfeǰa	6,000
Faridi	فريدي	Ahvaz	1,000
Āl-e Bū Rawāya	آل بو رواية	around Ḡoreyba on Karkheh	700
Banū Ṭorof	بنی طرف	southern loop of Karkheh and Western marshes of Kūt Nahr Hāšem	20,000
ʿEkreš	عکرش	North of Ahvaz and between the city and Hoveyzeh	5,000
Ḥardān	حردان	West and north of Ahvaz and between the city and Hoveyzeh, right bank of Karun	2,500
Zarqān	زرقان	Northeast of Ahvaz	1,500
Banū Sāla	بنی سالة	Southwest of Ahvaz, Karkheh marshlands	15,000
Bāvīya	باویة	Bavi	20,000
Banū Tamīm	بنی تمیم	Between Hoveyzeh and Ahvaz toward the south	10,000
Āl Ḵamīs	آل خمیس	Southwest of Ramhormoz	2,500
Moḥaysen	محیسن	Between Karun and Iraq border	12,000
Banū Kaʿb	بنی کعب	Southeastern half of Abadan to Mahshahr	55,000
Šarīfāt	شریفات	Left bank of Jarahi	1,000
Qanawātī	قنواتی	Around Mahshahr	5,250

=== Genetic studies ===
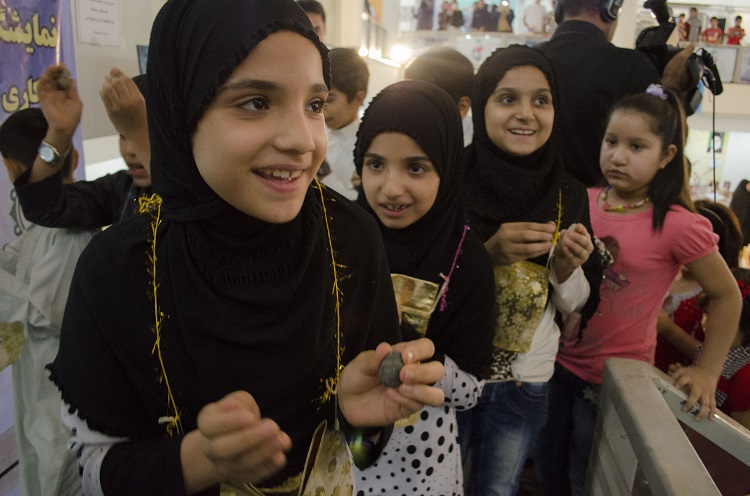
Khouzestani Arab Children celebrating Gargee'an

According to Farjadian and Ghaderi who had studied HLA class II allele and haplotype frequencies, Khuzestani Arabs are genetically different from Arabs and their genetic affinity with other Iranian people "might be the result of their common ancestry". Hajjej et al. found that Khuzestani Arabs have close relatedness with Gabesians. Haplogroup J1-M267 reaches 33.4% in samples from Khuzestan, higher than in other parts of Iran. It also reaches a frequency of 31.6% in Khuzestani Arabs.

== Discrimination allegations ==
According to Amnesty International, Khuzestani Arabs face discrimination by the authorities concerning politics, employment and cultural rights, whereas Iran completely rejects such accusations, and considers such charges exaggerated.

There have also been allegations of arrests of Khuzestani Arabs who have converted to Sunni Islam, according to British activist Peter Tatchell. Meanwhile, according to the Islamic Republic of Iran, there is no such crime or penalty in its law for converting to Sunnism. According to the International Campaign for Sunni Prisoners in Iran (ICSPI), the crackdown is due to the Iranian government's alarm at "the rise of Sunni Islam among the Ahwazi Arabs in the traditionally Shia-majority Khuzestan province." However, the wave of Sunni Islam in Khuzestan was described as a trend which had dissipated "just as quickly" as it had started, and was caused by a mixture of frustration with the Iranian government as well as a desire to be further welcomed in the Pan-Arab movement, as most Arabs are Sunni.

== Politics ==
Foreign actors such as the United Kingdom and the Ba'athist Iraq tried to exploit and spread ethnic sentiments as a leverage. During Iran–Iraq War, Khuzestani Arabs rejected calls made by Saddam Hussein for siding with Iraq and resisted against his invasion.

According to Yadullah Shahibzadeh, when Mohammad Khatami took power in the late 1990s, "Arab activists in Khuzestan used the reform movement as a ticket to display the mobilizing capacity of the Arab politics of identity". 2003 Iranian local elections marked a victory for advocates of Arab identity politics in the southwest of Khuzestan province.

A few months later, the Islamic Reconciliation Party that championed defending the Arab community in Khuzestan, was split into two factions. The democratic faction that was committed to the reform movement and its democratization platform, and a traditional faction with radical Arab nationalist tendencies. The former faction that coordinated their activities with the Islamic Iran Participation Front, left the party and founded Al-Afaq Party resulting in the Arab nationalist faction dominating the Islamic Reconciliation Party.

Arab politics of identity then became more radical and adopted a self-defeating strategy of political subjectivity that instead of "consolidating their status as Iranian citizens with full political and civil rights... challenged other groups who demanded equal rights for all citizens" and resulted in polarization of the local public sphere between Arabs and non-Arabs. By 2005 and the time Mahmoud Ahmadinejad took office, Arab politics of identity ceased to exist as a local political force in Khuzestan province.
