= Shahabi (disambiguation) =

Shahabi is a village in Fars Province, Iran.

Shahabi may also refer to:

- Shahabi (surname)
- Khvor-e Shahabi, village in Bushehr Province, Iran

== See also ==
- Shahab (disambiguation)
