= Ferydoon Hemmati =

Iranian politician

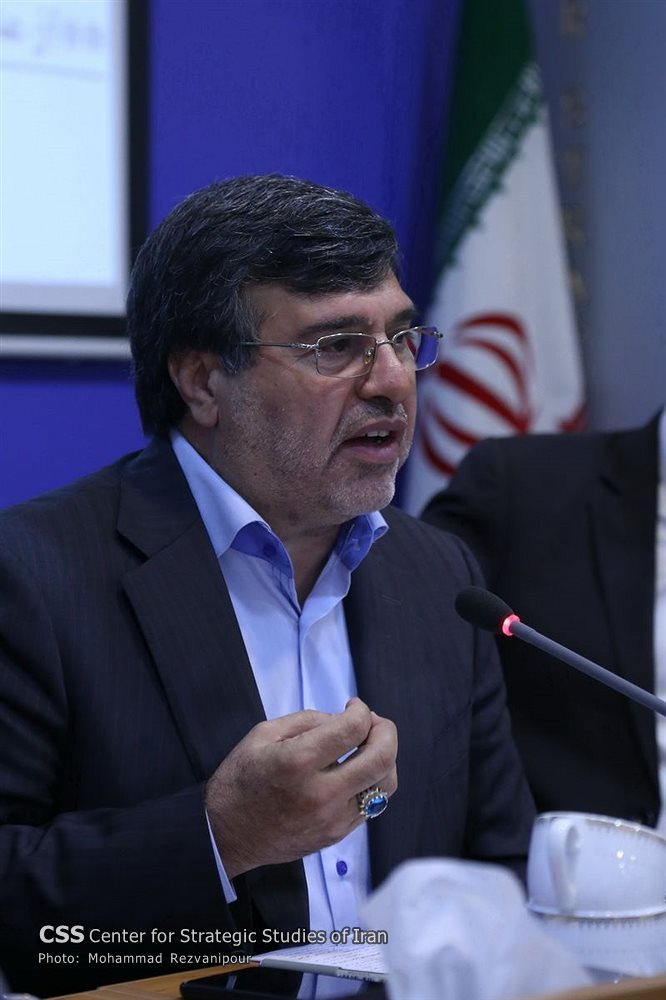

Governor-general of Hormozgan
- In office 13 September 2017 – 3 October 2021
- President: Hassan Rouhani
- Preceded by: Jasem Jaderi
- Succeeded by: Mahdi Dousti

Governor-general of Qazvin
- In office 2015–2017
- President: Hassan Rouhani
- Preceded by: Morteza Rozbeh
- Succeeded by: Abdolmohammad Zahedi

Member of Iranian Parliament
- Incumbent
- Assumed office 27 May 2024
- Constituency: Ilam
- In office 28 May 2004 – 27 May 2008
- Constituency: Ilam

Personal details
- Born: 1960 (age 65–66) Ilam, Iran
- Party: Principlists
- Education: Shahid Beheshti University

Ferydoon Hemmati (Persian: فریدون همتی, born 1960 in Ilam) is an Iranian politician who served as the governor of Hormozgan from 2017 to 2021. Hemmati served as governor of Qazvin Province from 2015 to 2017. He is the current member of the Islamic Consultative Assembly since 2024 and also served as a member of the Islamic Consultative Assembly from 2004 to 2008.
