= Shahabi (surname) =

Shahabi (Persian: شهابی, literally "meteoric") is a Persian language surname. Notable people with the name include:

- Cyrus Shahabi (fl. 1989–2014), Iranian-American computer scientist
- Hossein Shahabi (born 1967), Iranian film director, screenwriter and film producer
- Katayoon Shahabi (born 1968), Iranian film producer
- Mohammad Shahabi (1922–1973), Ahwazi musician and dulcimer player
- Reza Shahabi (fl. 2010–2012), Iranian trade unionist
- Saeeid Shahabi (born 1954) Bahraini political activist and journalist
- Mustafa Shahabi (born 1893), Syrian agronomist, politician, writer, and director of the Arab Academy of Damascus

== See also ==
- Shahabi (disambiguation)
