= Ali Hashemi (commander) =

Iranian military officer (1961–1988)

Sardar Ali Hashemi
- علی هاشمی
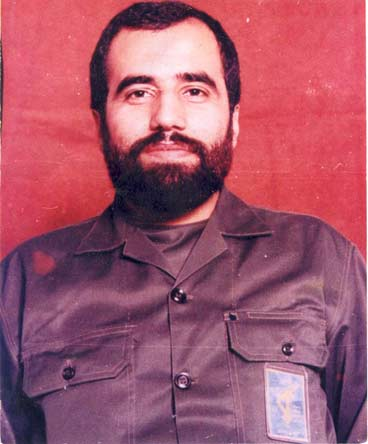
- Born: 31 December 1961; Hasir-Abad District, Ahvaz, Imperial State of Iran
- Died: 25 June 1988 (aged 26); Majnoon Island, Ba'athist Iraq
- Burial place: Ahvaz, Iran
- Military career
- Allegiance: Iran
- Branch: Islamic Revolutionary Guard Corps
- Service years: 1980–1988
- Rank: Brigadier general
- Nickname: "General of Hoor"
- Commands: 37th Noor Brigade; Nosrat Headquarters, 6th Imam Sadeq Corps
- Conflicts: Iran–Iraq War; Operation Beit-ol-Moqaddas; Operation Kheibar

Ali Hashemi (Persian/Arabic: علی هاشمی), commonly known as General of Marshes or Shahid Ali Hashemi, was an Iranian military commander in the IRGC and a prominent military figure during the Iran–Iraq War. He was born in 1961 in Ahwaz. During the war, he managed several brigades, divisions, Basij paramilitaries and IRGC units in Khuzestan and Lorestan and likewise was appointed as the commander of "Nosrat secret headquarters" in 1983 by Mohsen Rezaee. in 1987, Hashemi was appointed as the commander of the 6th Imam Sadiq Corps.

A part of Hashemi's testament is as follows:

"O' the martyr-productive nation of Iran, we went; but we put its duty on each one of you; you always keep our blood alive till Islam be alive. And you, the Iranian prolific youth of Hezbollah, although I swiftly went towards the believed at a young age"

Hashemi who was well known as "Sardar-e-Hoor" (General of the Marshes), was eventually killed in 1988 along with a group of Iranian soldiers among Mehdi Narimi in Majnoon Island, and his body came back to Iran after 22 years. Hashemi was an Iranian Arab and got married in 1984 and had a son and daughter

== See also ==
- Ahmad Kazemi
- Mehdi Bakeri
- Mehdi Zeinoddin
- Mohammad Ebrahim Hemmat
