= Hasan Badi' =

Iranian-Iraqi writer, poet and journalist (1872–1937)

Agha Mirza Hasan Badi' Nusrat al-Wizarah
- حسن بدیع
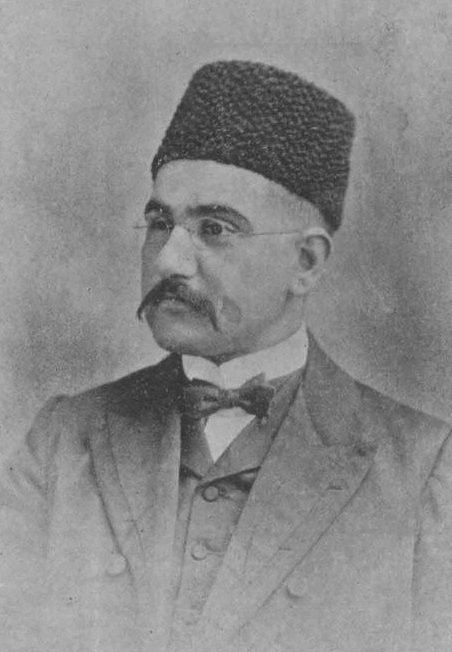
- A portrait of Hasan Badi' from his book Tarikh-e Basra, published 1914
- Born: Hasan ibn Reza Behbahani Shirazi; 1872; Kadhimiya, Baghdad vilayet, Ottoman Empire (present-day Iraq)
- Died: 1937 (aged 64–65); Tehran, Imperial State of Iran
- Occupations: Journalist; writer; poet; diplomat
- Years active: 1905-1937
- Movement: Persian Constitutional Revolution

Agha Mirza Mohammad Hasan ibn Mohammad Reza ibn Hussein Behbahani Shirazi honorifically known as Nusrat al-Wizarah Shirazi nicknamed as Badi’ (Persian: حسن بدیع;1872-1937) was an Iranian journalist, writer, poet and diplomat. Born in Kadhimiya, near Baghdad (then part of the Ottoman Empire, now Iraq) to an Iranian immigrant family, he grew up in Basra, the workplace of his merchant father. In 1905, he founded the "Iranians of Basra Society" for the Iranian community there, and published his poems and articles in support of the Persian Constitutional Revolution in Habl al-Matin. In 1920 immigrated to Iran and joined the Ministry of Foreign Affairs, and was appointed to the Iranian consulate in various Iraqi cities, including Karbala, Basra, Baghdad, then Herat and finally Beirut. Therefore, titled as Nusrat al-Wizarah, literally means "The Supporter of Wizarah", the Ministry. He died of a stroke in Tehran at the age of 65. In addition to his poetry collection, he wrote or rewrote many works of fiction. Badi' considered one of the first Iranian novelists of the twentieth century. He also wrote History of Basra in Persian.

== Life ==
He is Mohammed Hassan ibn Muhammad Reza ibn Hussein ibn Muhammad Hadi Behbehani Shirazi, better known and nicknamed "Badi'", titled as "Nusrat al-Wizarah Shirazi". He was born in 1872 in Kadhimiya in the Ottoman vilayet of Baghdad. His father, Reza Behbehani, was an Iranian merchant living in Basra, who was born in Shiraz and moved to Basra to work at an early age, and settled there.

He studied literature and Arabic in Basra and also learned French. At the beginning of the Persian Constitutional Revolution in 1905, he founded the "Iranians of Basra Society", and published his poems and articles in support of constitutionalism in Habl al-Matin. After the overthrow of Mohammad Ali Shah Qajar in 1909 and the proclamation of the constitution, he held a glorious celebration. After the constitution expired in 1911, he continued writing about Iran in newspapers.

Immigrated to Iran in 1920. Joined the Ministry of Foreign Affairs and was appointed to the Iranian consulate in several cities, including: Karbala, Basra, Baghdad, Herat and Beirut.

Hassan Badi' died of a stroke in 1937 in Tehran, the capital of Imperial State of Iran.

== Literary career ==
He wrote a book on Persian grammar and the history of Basra in three chapters. He wrote poetry for various purposes, and his poetry collection was published in Mumbai in 1914. Became interested to European literature and translated or rewritten some of the works of Guy de Maupassant from French into Persian, and published a novel entitled “The Ancient Story or the Story of Cyrus the Great” in 1920, influenced by Greek historical novels and French adventure literature. According to Hassan Mir Abedini, "He took the main theme of his story from Bijan and Manijeh of the Shahnameh and tried to integrate it with the new research of European scholars. The historical and educational element dominated the narrative aspect and slowed down the narrative movement of the work." With his three works, he is considered one of the first novelists in Iranian literature in the constitutional era.

== Personal life ==
Among his sons was Mohsen, a prominent director and cinematographer, who was born on May 22, 1908, in Basra and died on August 3, 1989, in Tehran.

== Works ==
- "دستور زبان فارسی"
- "تاریخ بصره"
- "شمس‌الدین و قمر"
- "داستان باستان یا سرگذشت كوروش"
- "داش مشتی در پاريس"

== See also ==
- Iranians in Iraq
- Ottoman Iraq
