= Jassem Ghazbanpour =

Iranian photographer

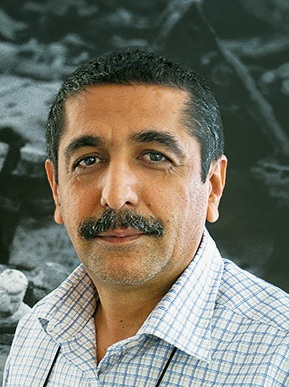
- Born: May 31, 1963 (age 63); Khorramshahr, Iran
- Education: Tehran University of Art (BA)
- Occupation: Freelance photographer
- Website: http://jassemphotographer.com/

Jassem Ghazbanpour (Persian: جاسم غضبانپور) (born May 31, 1963) is an Iranian photographer.

== Early life ==
Ghazbanpour was born in Khoramshahr, Iran on May 31, 1963. He began photographing in the field of social documentary in 1976, as a teenager. In his youth, his photography was attempting to record the circumstances and the daily life of the people of his birthplace.

In 1980, with the start of the Iran–Iraq War, he started photographing battlefields and the cities which had been affected by the war, to show the impact of it. Ghazbanpour earned his BA in the field of photography from Tehran University of Art (1983–1986).

== Photography ==
Ghazbanpour has taken photographs from Afghanistan, (just after the fall of the Taliban), Iraq (during the Gulf War and Iraq War) and Iraqi Kurdistan (independence period). After the war ended, Ghazbanpour started to take pictures of the culture, art, and the architecture of Iran, in all possible aspects, and he represented a new look of Iran in his works.

In addition to publishing several books in the war field (e.g. Chemical Massacre in Halabja, Sky and Earth: Tehran under missile attack), he has published many books about Iran (e.g. New Life-Old Structure, Iranian House, Iran from the Sky, The Splendor of Iran). In his background, he has numerous individual and group exhibitions in Iran and in other countries such as Indonesia, Japan, France, Italy. Additionally, many local and international magazines and newspapers have used his photos.

== Bibliography ==
- New life- old structure, a selection of valuable structures with plans (3 vol.), Ministry of Housing and Urban Development, 1st edition1992, 2nd edition1993
- Sky and Earth: Tehran under missile attack, Research and planning center of Tehran, selected as “The war year book”, Tehran, 1997
- Aqa Lotf’ Ali Souratgar-e-Shirazi: Biography and his works, Iran Cultural Heritage organization, 1997
- Iranian House: introducing 50 Iranian valuable old houses with plans, National Organization of Housing 1996, Tiss publication, 2001
- Iran from the Sky: aerial photos from different cities of Iran, Tiss Publication, fall 2000
- The Splendor of Iran (3 volumes), Booth Clibborn, England, 2001
- Life and works of Sani–ol–Molk, Iran University Press (IUP), Tehran, 2003
- Bam: photo Report on Bam before and after the earthquake, Tiss publication, 1st 2003, 2nd 2004
- A Review on the Iran music background based on pre-Islamic remain objects, Iran Cultural Heritage organization, spring 2004
- Splendors of Quran Calligraphy & Illumination, Contributor: Martin Lings, Photographs by Jassem Ghazbanpour, Thesaurus Islamicus Foundation, Thames & Hudson, ISBN 0-500-97648-1, London, Dec. 2005
- Splendor of Khuzestan, Tiss Publication, 2009
- Contemporary Architecture of Iran: 75 years of public building experience- from 1921 to 1996 Ministry of Housing and Urban Development, 2009
- City eyewitnesses: selection of wall paintings and sculptures of Tehran, Tiss Publication, 2010

== Photo reports ==
- The Independent, pictorial report of Kurds of Iraq, No. 1384, Saturday Mar.23, London, 1991
- Time International, pictorial report of the Kurds of Iraq, vol. 137, No. 13, April 1, 1991
- ABC, victims of Chemical attack in Iran- Iraq War, Sep.28, Madrid, 1996
- El Pais, Victimas olvidadas de Saddam (Victims of Chemical attack in Sardasht, Kurdistan), P. 20, Madrid, Feb.18, 2007
- El Pais, Religious Minorities in Iran, Jews, p. 4, Madrid, April 9, 2007
- El Pais, Marriage Dating Agency, P. 46, Madrid, Oct.7, 2007
- El Pais, woman's Futsal team exercises with Spanish trainer, P. 35, Madrid, Nov.12, 2007
- El Pais, interview with Masoumeh Ebtekar (Tehran City Council Member), P. 8, Madrid, Dec.14, 2006
- El Pais, interview with Mohammad Ali Abtahi (Center for Interreligious Dialogue & Civilization), Madrid, Dec.18, 2007
- AD: Architectural Design, Iran: past, present, future, No. 217, P. 18 Khajo Bridge, 20 Shazde Garden, 21 Fin garden,42 Chelsoton palace, 43 Ibn sina mausoleum (above)& Tehran museum of contemporary arts below,76–77 Azadi square, London, May / June 2012

== Exhibitions ==
- 36 million people City (To celebrate the 2nd anniversary of the Khorramshahr liberation), Solo Exhibition, Tehran University of Art, May 1984
- The 2nd Annual photo exhibition, Group Exhibition, Tehran Museum of Contemporary Art, Nov.1988
- The 3rd Annual photo exhibition, Group Exhibition, Tehran Museum of Contemporary Art, Feb. 1989
- The 1st Journalistic photos exhibition, Group Exhibition, Tehran Museum of Contemporary Art, Dec 1990
- The 4th Annual photo exhibition, Group Exhibition, Tehran Museum of Contemporary Art, Jan. 1991
- Tehran under missile attack, Solo exhibition, District 1 gallery, Tehran Research and Planning Center, Feb 1996
- Paradise, the Lost, Group exhibition, Seyhoon Gallery, Tehran, Dec.1996
- Aerial Photos, Solo exhibition, District 1 gallery, Tehran Research and Planning Center, Jan. 1999
- Regards Persans – une revolution photographique", Group exhibition, Paris Musees, June 20- August 31, 2001
- Iran, Group exhibition, Silk Road Gallery, Tehran, 2002
- Splendor of Iranian Garden: Iranian Garden photos and plans, Solo Exhibition, Ministry of Housing and Urban Development lobby, Sep. 2004
- SOS- world heritage, Group exhibition, UNESCO and NHK, Tokyo international university of fine art and music, Japan, 2006
- Iranian Lady, Group exhibition, Municipal Paris, April 2008
- Tehran Documented, Group exhibition, Aran Gallery, July 2010
- Requiem for Innocence, Group exhibition, Aran Gallery, Sept. 2011
- Iran Modern, Group exhibition, Asia Society Museum, New York, Sep. 2013 – Jan. 2014
- UNEDITED HISTORY, Iran 1960–2014, Group exhibition, Musée d'Art Moderne de la Ville de Paris, Paris, May- Aug. 2014
- UNEDITED HISTORY, Iran 1960–2014, Group exhibition, MAXXI museum, Rome, Italy, December 10, 2014 March 29, 2015

== Awards ==
- 1985 2nd place Graphic photography, 4th Iranian young Cinema Festival-Tehran
- 1987 3rd place, The 4th Education from view of images photo competition-Tehran
- 1990 Merit Certificate, "world in Focus", International photo competition, Red Cross, Red Crescent Magazine, International Federation of Red Cross and Red Crescent Societies
- 1991 3rd place, "1st Journalistic photos exhibition"
- 2004 "Active Photographer of the year" award, "Iranian Photographers house"
- 2006 "Active Photographer of the year" award, "Iranian Photographers house"
- 2008 Honor plaque for the best work, "The 2nd Festival of top research and innovation in the urban management"
- 2008 Appreciated for cooperating in "Photo Expo" with "Art Academy"
- 2008 Appreciated in, "The 11th Holly Defense year book festival" for publishing the book: "Eye Witnesses of the Time"

== Film Photography ==
- And Life Goes On, Abbas Kiarostami, 1992
- The pear tree, Dariush Mehrjoui, 1998

== Membership in Professional Groups and Associations ==
- Fine Arts developing Institute
- National Association of Photography
- Photographers Association of crisis, Iran
- Iran Press Photographers Association
- Iran Cultural Heritage Photographers Association
- Caroun Photo Club (CPC), Vancouver, Canada
- Canadian Association for Photographic Art (CAPA)
