= Ahmad al-Muhsini =

Iranian faqih and writer

- أحمد المحسني
- Born: 1744; Medina, Habesh Eyalet, Ottoman Empire
- Died: 1831; Dowraq, Arabistan, Qajar Iran
- Occupations: Islamic jurist; writer; poet
- Writing career
- Language: Arabic
- Genres: Religious literature and poetry

Ahmad bin Muhammad al-Muhsini (Arabic: أحمد بن محمد المحسني, romanized: Aḥmad ibn Muḥammad al-Muḥsinī; 1744 – 1831) was an Eastern Arabian-Iranian Ja'fari jurist and writer. He was born in Medina during his father's travels and grew up in Al-Ahsa, Eastern Arabia. He went to Iraq to complete his religious education and studied with Ja'far Kashif al-Ghita', Muhammad Husayn al-Araji al-Kazemi, M.M Bahr al-Ulum and the others. Then he settled with his family in Dowraq as a Shaykhi mujtahid, where he worked as a religious and spiritual leader for the Twelver Shiites in the region of Arabistan in the early years of Qajar Iran, from 1799 until his death during 1830s plague epidemic. Al-Muhsini left behind many handwritten books, booklets, epistles and poetry.

== Biography ==
His full nasab is: Jamal al-Din Ahmad bin Muhammad bin Muhsin bin Ali bin Muhammad bin Ahmad bin Muhammad bin Hussein bin Ahmad bin Muhammad bin Khamis bin Saif, Al-Rab’i Al-Ahsa’i Al-Quraini. He was the first person who has been called "Al-Muhsini" in his family, a family name derived from the grandfather's first name. He was born in Medina in 1157 AH / 1744 AD during his father's travel to Hejaz. His father, Muhammad, was residing in the village of Al-Qurain in the northern of Al-Ahsa. Under his care, he lived and raised in Al-Ahsa, and his first teacher was his father who taught him initial lessons, then he became an student of Hussain Al-Asfoor. He moved to Ottoman Iraq. There, he completed his religious educations in Najaf and Karbala under its scholars, such as: Ja'far Kashif al-Ghita', Muhammad Husayn al-Araji al-Kazemi, M.M Bahr al-Ulum and he had ijazah from these. He returned to his hometown in 1795. In 1799, he left Al-Ahsa to and headed towards Arabistan, and settled in the city of Dowraq, where he worked as a religious leader for the Twelver Shiites in the region of Arabistan in the early years of Qajar Iran. He collected most of the books of the past ulema, and made a great library containing valuable books that helped him to write more than fourteen works.

Ahmad al-Muhsini died of the plague in Dowraq in 1247 AH / 1831 AD, at the age of 86 years. His body was buried in a special cemetery that he prepared for himself, next to the mosque where he was the imam.

== Poetry ==
Before he became a poet, he was attracted by fiqh, literature then poetry. He left behind a collection of handwritten poetry that exceeds two thousand verses. Most of his poems are dated between 1808 and 1813, while the rest of the poems are undated, which indicates that he started writing poetry late in life. His poetry is dominated by love and loyalty to the family of Muhammad from his Twelver Shia outlook. The dictionary Al-Babtain of Contemporary Arab Poets described his poetry as follows:

A faqih and imitated poet, most of his poetry is in praises of the Prophet Ahl al-Bayt and includes scenes from history and a mention of the exploits of those who praise them. He also wrote poetry on Tawassul to the Ahl al-Bayt. He has a qasida about nostalgia for abandonment and his childhood companions. He was diverse in prosody...He has verses on Nasīb, haja', exhortation and other topics, which he wrote on the rhymed meter. His language is abundant and eloquent, contains clear statements from the classic methods of rhetoric as his poetry is influenced by the classics in language, construction and meanings. He wrote also Band and in vernacular language.

== Works ==
Al-Muhsini wrote many annonations (ḥāshiyah) and explanations (Sharḥ) on :Bihar al-Anwar by Mohammad-Baqer Majlesi, Al-Tanqīḥ al-rāʼiʻ by Migdad al-Syiuri, Al-Rawḍah al-Bahiyah and Al-mukhtaṣar al-nāfiʻ by Muhaqqiq al-Hilli, Qawa'id al-ahkam by Al-Hilli, Madarak al-Ahkam by Muhammad al-Amili, Masalik al-Afham by Zayn al-Din al-Amili and Mafātīḩ al-sharā'i' by Mohsen Fayz Kashani. Other works by Al-Muhsini including:

- Arabic: منهل الصفا في أحكام شريعة المصطفى
- Arabic: وقاية المكلف من سوء الموقف
- Arabic: رسالة حسنة في الجهر والإخفاف بالبسلمة والتسبيح في الأخيرتين وثالثة المغرب
- Arabic: رسالة في حجية ظواهر الكتاب الكريم
- Arabic: رسالة في صلاة الجمعة أيام الغيبة
- Arabic: رسالة في ما يغفر من الذنوب وما لا يغفر
- Arabic: فائدة في النسبة بين الكفر والشرك
