= Hashem Shabani =

Hashem Shabania
- Died: 27 January 2014 (age 32); Undisclosed prison in Iran
- Cause of death: Execution by hanging
- Other name: Hashem Shabaninejad
- Occupations: Teacher, poet, activist

Hashem Shabani (Arabic: هاشم شعباني, died 27 January 2014), also known as Hashem Shabaninejad, was an ethnic Ahwazi Arab citizen of the Islamic Republic of Iran. He was a high school teacher of Arabic language and literature, a poet in both Arabic and Persian, and an activist who promoted Arabic culture and literature in Iran. In February 2011, government authorities arrested Shabani and four other Ahwazis.

In December 2011, in a programme on Iran's Press TV, which Shabani and two other Ahwazi Arabs confessed to being part of an armed Arab terrorist group. Human rights groups say these confessions were coerced under torture. In July 2012, Shabani and the four others arrested with him were sentenced to death on charges of Moharebeh ("waging war on God"), sowing corruption on earth, acting against national security, and spreading propaganda against the Islamic Republic.

The Iranian Supreme Court upheld the death sentences in January 2013, and on 27 January 2014, Shabani was executed along with fellow Ahwazi Arab Hadi Rashedi.

== Biography ==
Until his arrest, Shabani resided in Ramshir (known in Arabic as Khalafabad) in Iran's Khuzestan Province with his wife and one child. He worked as a teacher of Arabic language and literature in a local high school. He was also known as a poet in Arabic and Persian, and founded the Dialogue Institute, which promoted Arabic culture and literature in Iran.

He held a bachelor's degree in Arabic language literature and education and a master's degree in political science from Ahwaz University.

== Arrest ==
In February 2011, Shabani was arrested along with four others Iranian Arabs - Hadi Rashedi, Mohammad-Ali Amouri and the brothers Mokhtar and Jaber Alboshokeh. Their arrests were considered part of a broader government crackdown at the time against Iran's Arab minority. According to Amnesty International, these individuals were detained "apparently in connection with their cultural activities, such as organizing events in the Arabic language, conferences, educational courses, art classes, and poetry recital gatherings".

== Televised confession ==
On 13 December 2011, Press TV, the English-language network of the government-run Islamic Republic of Iran Broadcasting, broadcast a "documentary" featuring Shabani, Rashedi, and another Arab man, Taha Heidarian. In the program, Shabani and Rashedi confessed "to being part of an armed Arab terrorist group called the Al-Moqawama al-Shaabiya ('People’s Movement'), which was responsible for shooting at four government employees". Press TV said that the United States and the United Kingdom supported this terrorist group.

Human rights groups maintain that the confessions "were coerced under duress and torture during their detention at a local Intelligence Ministry facility, and that they denied the charges against them in court". Reported examples of torture are a broken pelvic bone suffered by Rashedi, and that Shabani's feet were placed in boiling water to make him confess.

== Death sentence ==
On 7 July 2012, a Revolutionary Court sentenced Shabani and the four other Arabs arrested in February 2011 to death on charges of Moharebeh ("waging war on God"), as well as "sowing corruption on earth, propaganda against the Islamic Republic and acting against national security". Amnesty International said that the confessions of Shabani and Rashedi shown on Press TV were "in violation of international standards for fair trial". In January 2013, the Iranian Supreme Court upheld their death sentences.

== Execution ==
On 29 January 2014, reports emerged that Shabani and Rashedi had been executed. In violation of Iran's own legal regulations, authorities had executed the two men without first notifying their families or attorneys. The hangings reportedly took place on 27 January in an undisclosed prison after Iranian President Hassan Rouhani approved the sentences.
