= Habl al-Matin =

1907 Persian-language political journal

Ḥabl al-matīn
- Editor: Mo'ayyed-al-Eslam, Sayyed Hasan and Shaikh Yahya Kashani
- Categories: Politics
- First issue: 1907
- Final issue: 1908
- Country: Iran
- Based in: Tehran
- Language: Persian
- Website: Ḥabl al-matīn

The Persian-language magazine Habl al-Matin (Persian: حبل‌المتین, lit. 'Strong cord'), one of the most important political journals during the Iran Constitutional Revolution, was published daily in Teheran from 1907 to 1908.

One volume with a total of 274 issues was published. Founded as a subsidiary of the magazine Habl al-Matin which was published in Calcutta it should offer current news about Iran. The founders and owners were Moayyed-al-Eslam, publisher of the Indian Habl al-Matin and his younger brother Sayyed Hasan. As of the 20th edition, Shaikh Yahya Kashani (Khamei), a well-known journalist and owner of the magazines Majles, Irān and Irān-e emruz was named as editor. During the Constitutional Revolution, Hasan used the journal to support the movement in June 1908. The magazine was suspended after the coup d'état of Mohammed Ali Shah and Sayyed Hasan was exiled.
