= Yousef Azizi (Bani-Torof) =

Iranian journalist

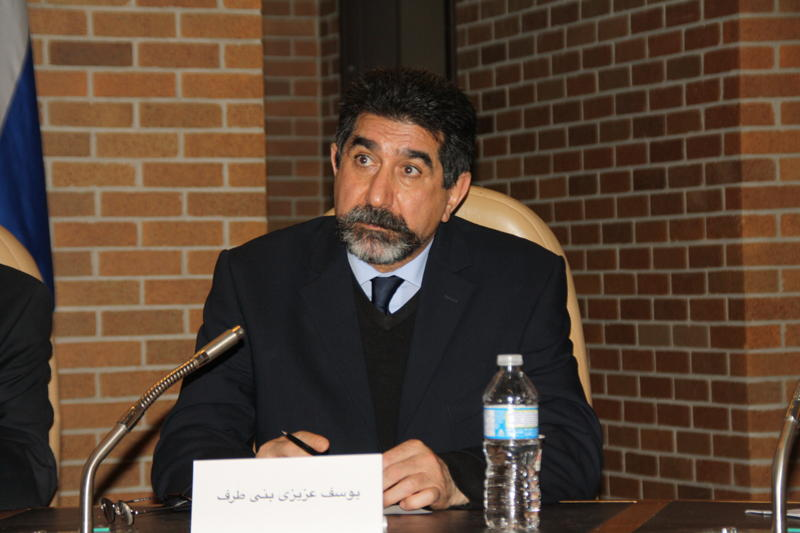
Yousef Azizi Bani-Torof

Yousef Azizi (Bani-Torof) (born April 21, 1951 in Susangerd, Iran) is an Iranian Arab journalist living in exile in London, United Kingdom. Azizi is a former member of the Association of Iran's Writers and has translated many works from Arabic to Persian. He has adopted a second surname, Bani-Torof, to indicate his roots in the "Bani Torof" (in Arabic meaning "Children of Torof") Arab tribe.

On April 25, 2005, he was arrested at his home by security forces in connection with the Arab youth unrest in Khuzestan earlier that month and held at Evin Prison with other Iranian journalists and dissidents. He was released on June 28, 2005.

In August 2008, he was sentenced to five years in prison. While appealing the decision, he left Iran and was granted political asylum in United Kingdom.
