= Ab Gonji =

Ab Gonji ابگنجي
- Village
- Location within Iran
- Coordinates: 31°51′52″N 49°04′32″E
- Country: Iran
- Province: Khuzestan
- County: Shushtar
- Bakhsh: Central
- Rural District: Shahid Modarres

Population (2006)
  - Total: 28
- Time zone: UTC+3:30 (IRST)
  - Summer (DST): UTC+4:30 (IRDT)

Ab Gonji (Persian: ابگنجي, also Romanized as Āb Gonjī, Āb-e Gonjī, and Ab Ganjī; also known as Āb-i-Gunji and Ab-i-Gunjishk) is a village in Shahid Modarres Rural District, in the Central District of Shushtar County, Khuzestan Province, Iran. At the 2006 census, its population was 28, in 7 families.
