= Mohammad Shahabi =

Mohammad Shahabi (1922–1973; Persian: محمد شهابی), also known as Soltan Almagham (Persian: سلطان المقام), was a renowned Ahwazi musician and Dulcimer player. He was born in 1341 Hijri (1922/23) in Veys (Persian: ویس), belonging to the county of Bavi (Persian: باوی) in Ahvaz (Persian: اهواز), Khuzestan (Persian: خوزستان), Iran. Because of his reputation in musical performance he was given the honorific title "Soltan Almagham Alarabi Al-Ahwazi" (Arabic: سلطان المقام العربی الاهوازی), which means "king of Arabic style music in Ahwaz". After 50 years of playing the Dulcimer, and 2 years of suffering cancer, he died in 1393 Hijri (1973).

== Life ==
Shahabi dominated most of the original country music styles, e.g. the Hakimi style (Arabic: حکیمی). Accompanied by the "Tarath Al-Ahwaz" (Arabic: تراث الاهواز) band, he participated in 1392 hijri (1972) in a festival in Kerman where he achieved first place.

Shahabi also participated in some musical festivals abroad. He played for many of the most popular singers in Al-Ahwaz, like Abd al-Amir Edris (Arabic: عبد الامیر ادریس), Ali Neisi (Arabic: علی نیسی), Hamdi Saleh (Arabic: حمدی صالح) and so on. After his death the chief of music society and the CEO of Ministry of Culture and Islamic of the country sent their condolence messages. Also it was agreed that one night of the Musical Festival in the country, would be named in honor of him. Some artistic activists has expressed their dissatisfaction to not attending him by provincial officials.
