= Shahabi =

Shahabi شهابي
- Village
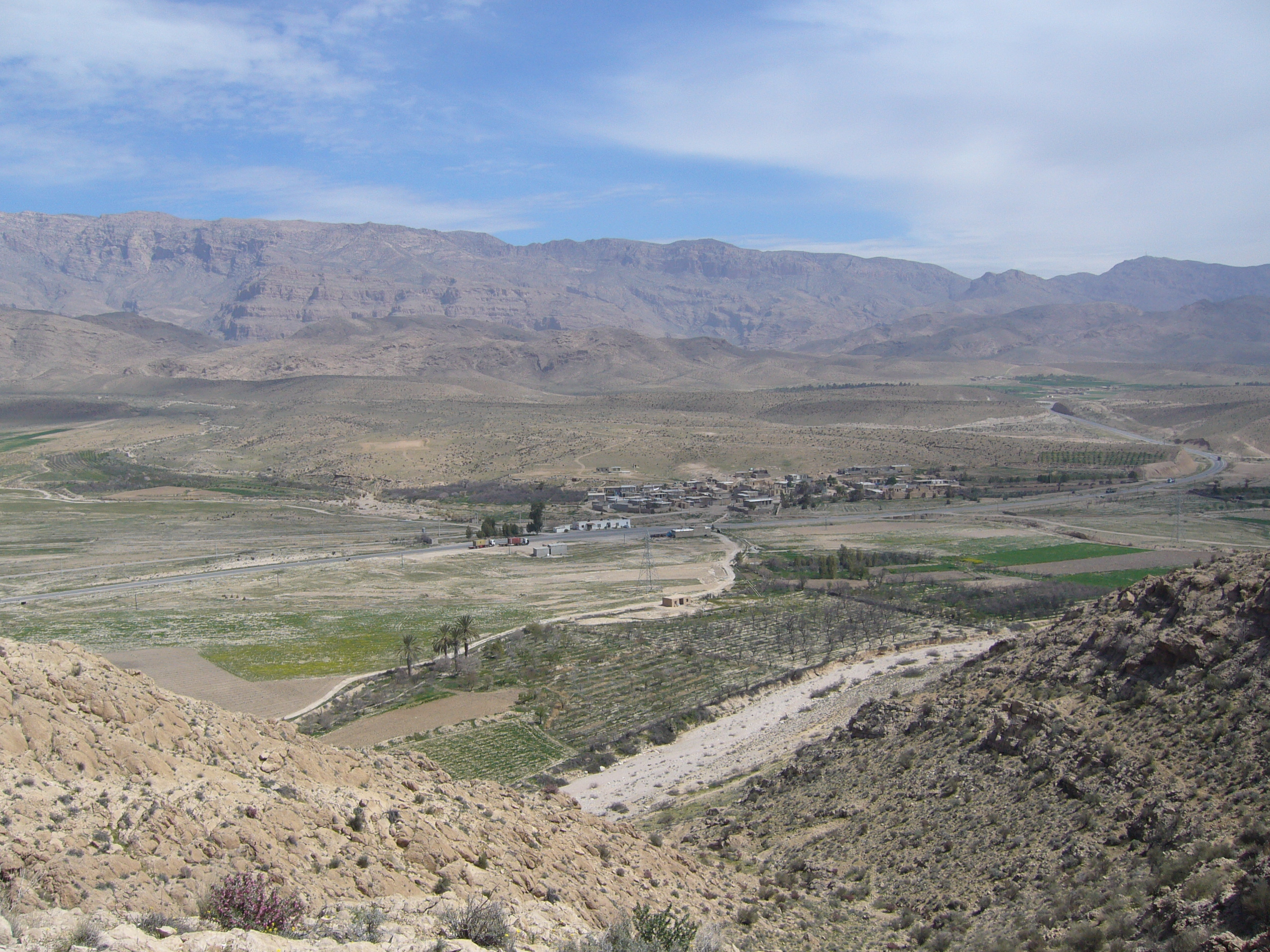

- Location within Iran
- Coordinates: 28°28′00″N 55°03′02″E
- Country: Iran
- Province: Fars
- County: Darab
- Bakhsh: Rostaq
- Rural District: Rostaq

Population (2006)
  - Total: 135
- Time zone: UTC+3:30 (IRST)
  - Summer (DST): UTC+4:30 (IRDT)

Shahabi (Persian: شهابي, also Romanized as Shahābī) is a village in Rostaq Rural District, Rostaq District, Darab County, Fars province, Iran. At the 2006 census, its population was 135, in 35 families.
