= Bani Turuf =

Arab tribe

Bani Torof is a large and populous Arab tribe in Iran, Khuzestan province. They primarily live in the area of Azadgan plain, Sosangard, Bostan, Howeiza, and especially in Ahvaz and a part of it in current Basra (Iraq).

This tribe is divided into two groups, Bayt Sayyah and Bayt Saeed.

They are also the namesake of a locality where Iranians from Kerman trained under Qassem Soleimani during the Iraq-Iran War.
