= Tehran Research and Planning Center =

Persian research center

Tehran Research and Planning Center (TRPC), or Tehran Urban Planning & Research Center (TUPRC) was established in 1978 as Supervisory on Tehran's, Iran expansion. In 1980 the preparation of strategic development plans was added to it duties. Activities of this center were concentrated on "strategic studies" since 2007.

The TRPC is a center for scientific studies, supporting the studies in urban management, Civil engineering scientific studies and crisis management in Tehran in 2016. Almost all of the personals that work in TRPC have PhD degree or they are PhD students that are graduated from the best universities all around the world.
