= Mohammad-Reza Fartousi =

- محمدرضا فرطوسی
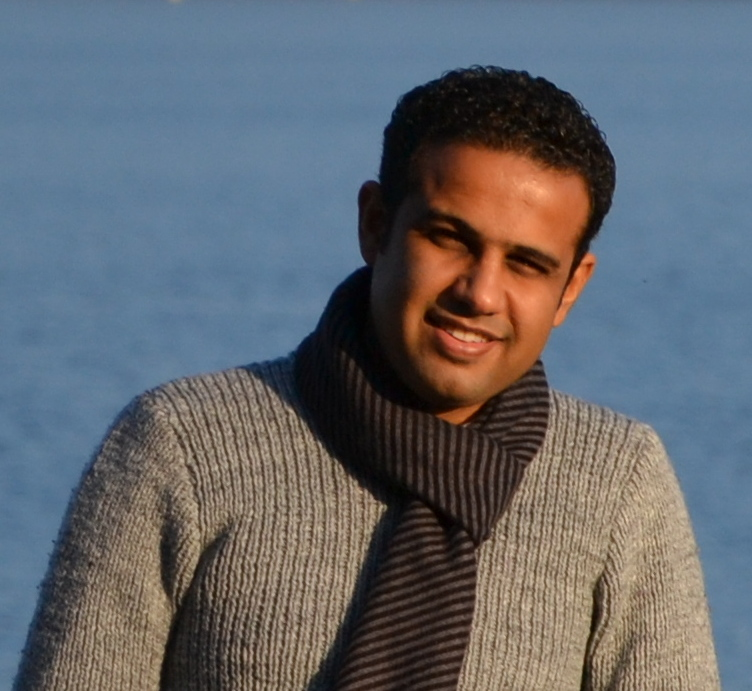
- Born: July 16, 1982 (age 43); Ahwaz, Iran
- Occupations: Filmmaker, artist
- Years active: 2002 - Present

Mohammad-Reza Fartousi is an Iranian independent producer, director and screenwriter who was born in 1982 in Ahwaz in Iran. He's a cinema graduate of Iran's Soureh University, a member of the Iranian Alliance of Motion Picture Guilds and has attended the workshops in film-making by Abbas Kiarostami.

Most of Fartousi's films have been shown in Iranian and foreign film festivals, receiving critical acclaims and awards. His films have also been shown at UCL University of London, Tehran University, Cairo University and the University of St. Andrews. Moreover, a film of his has been shown in United Nations Office at Geneva.

Fartousi is the founder of Filmival, a film distribution and marketing studio which is aimed at supporting the regional filmmakers from the Middle East and North Africa and presenting their films to the main film festivals and markets all around the world.
