= Iranian Arabs =

Ethnic Arab citizens of Iran

عرب إيران (Arabic) عرب‌های ايران (Persian)
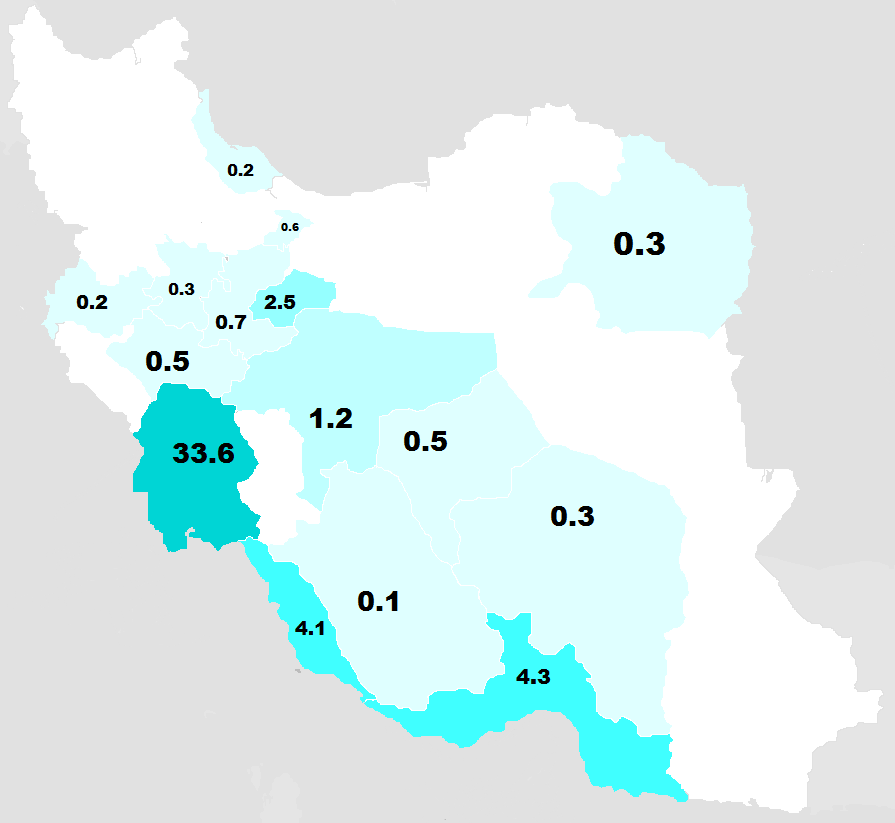

Total population
- 4 million (2026, est.)

Regions with significant populations
- Khuzestan, Khorasan, Hormozgan, Bushehr, Qom

Languages
- Arabic (Khuzestani, Khorasani, Gulf, South Mesopotamian), Persian

Religion
- Twelver Shi'a Islam (majority), Sunni Islam (minority)

Related ethnic groups
- Other Arabs (Huwala, Marsh Arabs, Arab-Persians, Iraqis, Kuwaitis, Bahranis), Persians.

Iranian Arabs (Arabic: عرب إيران ʿArabu Īrān; Persian: عرب‌های ايران Arabhā-ye Irān) are the citizens of Iran who are ethnically Arab. As of August 2026, their population stands at an estimated 4 million people. They are primarily concentrated in the Khuzestan province.

== Overview ==
The presence of Arabs in Iran dates back to the 7th-8th centuries AD, where under the Sasanian Empire, Mesopotamian Arabs were an important segment of the empire's population along and west of the lower Euphrates river in southern Iraq and between the Tigris and Euphrates in northern Iraq. This stretch included Arvand Rud, which meets at the current Iran–Iraq border, down to its mouth, where it discharges into the Persian Gulf. The Arabs of the Sasanian empire included nomads, semi-nomads, peasants, and townsmen. Some Arabs followed polytheistic religions, and a few adopted Judaism, but most appear to be Christians.

Additionally, Arabs have had a continuous presence in Iran since ancient times, long before the 7th century AD.

The historian and Iranologist Elton L. Daniel explains that for centuries, Iranian rulers maintained contacts with Arabs outside their borders, dealt with Arab subjects and client states such as those of the Lakhmids and Himyarites, and settled Arab tribesmen in various parts of the Iranian Plateau. The Arab expedition to Iran began before the Muslim conquests and continued with joint exertions of the civilized Arabs (ahl al-madar) and desert Arabs (ahl al-wabar).

According to the Minorities at Risk Project 2001, about 40 percent of Arabs are unskilled workers living in urban areas. The Arabs in the rural areas are primarily farmers and fishermen. The Arabs living along the Persian Gulf coastal plains are mostly pastoral nomads. Tribal loyalties are strong among rural Arabs, but also influence urban areas, impacting Arab socialization and politicization.

Multiple human rights groups, including Minority Rights Group International and Unrepresented Nations and Peoples Organization, have listed the population of Arab citizens in Khuzestan between 4-7 million. Moreover, Ahwazi rights groups estimate the Arab population of Iran to be over 10% of the general population (12 million people).

== History ==
Shapur II the Great (309–379 A.D.) of the Sasanian Empire, after a punitive expedition across the Persian Gulf early in his reign, transplanted several clans of the Taghleb to Dārzīn (Daharzīn) near Bam, several clans of the Abd al-Qays and Tamīm to Haǰar (the Kūh-e Hazār region) southeast of Kermān, several clans of the Bakr ben Wāʾel to Kermān, and several clans of the Hanzala to Tavvaz, near present-day Dālakī in Fārs.

Although after the Arab conquest of the Sasanian Persian empire in the 7th century, many Arab tribes settled in different parts of Iran, it is the Arab tribes of Khuzestan that have retained their identity in language, culture, and Shia Islam to the present day. But ethno-linguistic characteristics of the region must be studied against the long and turbulent history of the province, with its own local language Khuzi, which may have been of Elamite origin and which gradually disappeared in the early medieval period. The immigration of Arab tribes from outside the province was also a long-term process. There was a great influx of Arab-speaking immigrants into the province from the 16th to the 19th century, including the migration of the Banu Kaab and Banu Lam. There were attempts by the Iraqi Hussein regime during the Iran–Iraq War (1980–88) to generate Arab nationalism in the area, but without any palpable success.

=== Genetics ===
According to some old Iranian genetic studies, Iranian Arabs, genetically share similarity with other Iranian citizens and their genetic affinity "might be the result of their common ancestry", that indicates connections between Semitic-speaking and Indo-European-speaking peoples. While paternal lineages firmly link the population to the Near East, localized studies on specific immune markers, such as the one by Hajjej et al., have instead suggested outliers like a close relatedness with Gabesians. However, Haplogroup J1-M267, which is the predominant Arab haplogroup, reaches 33.4% in samples from Khuzestan, significantly higher than in other parts of Iran. It also reaches a frequency of 31.6% in Khuzestani Arabs. Sampling NRY diversity, it was determined that the Y-DNA haplogroup J1 and J2 are carried at high frequency among the Iranian Arabs, accounting for more than half of Iranian Arab haplogroups. The high frequency of haplogroup F derivatives, particularly J1 and J2, genetically aligns Iranian Arabs with Near Eastern and Southwest Asian populations. An elevated frequency of haplogroup J-M172 is typical of Near Eastern people and reflective of the genetic legacy of early agriculturalists in the Neolithic Near East c. 8000–4000 BCE. Haplogroup R1a1, and R1, typical of Indo-Iranian groups, occurred in more than 11 percent of the sample and haplogroup G was present in more than 5 percent.

== Regional groups ==
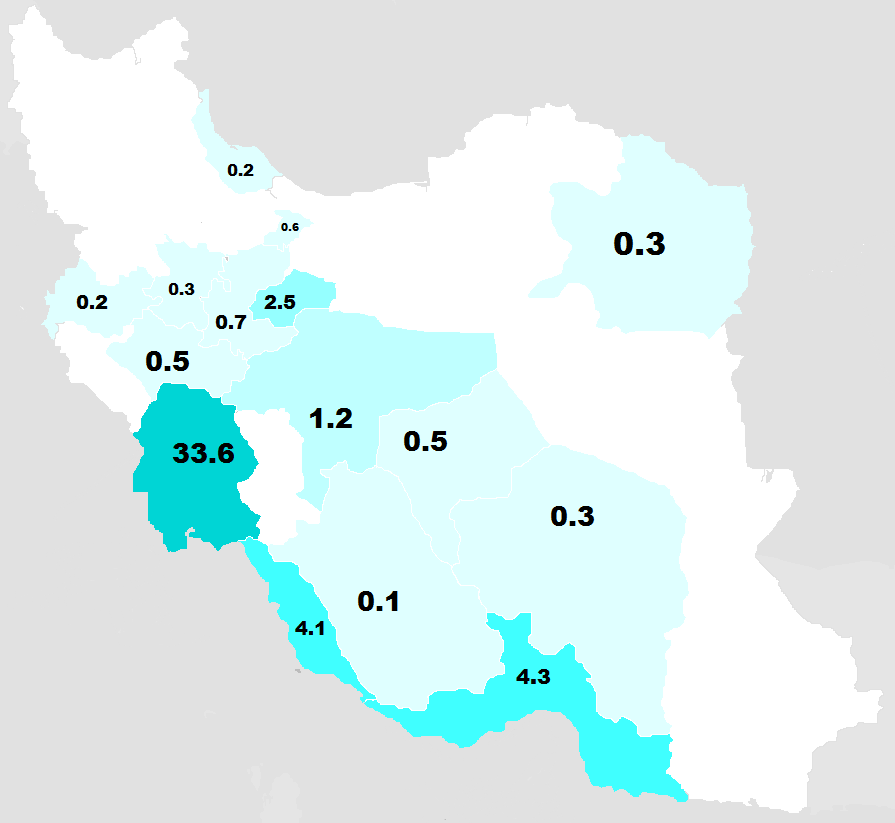
Percent Arab population of Iranian provinces, according to a survey carried out by Ministry of Culture in 2010.

=== Khuzestan ===
Most Iranian Arabs in Khuzestan province are bilingual speakers of Arabic and Persian. The Arabic spoken in the province is Khuzestani Arabic, a mixture of Gulf Arabic and South Mesopotamian Arabic.

Hamid Ahmadi noted that the Arabs of Khuzestan province are direct descendants of the ancient population of the area, having adopted the Arabic language and identity with the spread of Islam. However, there are numerous immigrant Arab tribes of Khuzestan with origins from the Arabian Peninsula, such as the Banu Ka'b at Dawraq, the later Fallāhīya and present-day Shadegan, the Musha'sha' at Hoveyzeh, Banu Tamim, and more from southern Iraq.

The Bani Turuf tribe is settled in the Dasht e Azadegan (formerly Dasht-e Mīshān) around the town of Hūzagān (formerly Hoveyzeh). It consists of seven tribes: the Sovārī, Mazraā, Shorfa, Banī Sāleh, Marvān, Qāṭeʿ, and Sayyed Nemat. North of the lands of the ʿAnāfeja of the Āl Katīr, in the area called Mīānāb, between the Kārūn and Karkheh Rivers, dwell several Arab tribes, of which the best known are the Kaab (probably an offshoot of the Banī Kaʿb of southern Khuzestan), the ʿAbd al khānī, the Mazraa, the Al Bū Rāwīya, and the Sādāt. These tribes gradually immigrated into Iran during and after the early years of the Qajar period.

==== Culture ====
Strong blood relation, one of the peculiarities of Iranian Arab society, results in cooperation between Arabs in hardship as well as the intensification of hostilities between tribes. Iranian Arabs are also well known for their hospitality.

==== Women's clothing ====
Women wear various types of scarves. The aba is a black robe-like dress with long sleeves from which hands are only exposed from the wrist. Another is the asabe, a turban-like scarf; the quality of the cloth denotes the social rank of the woman. The pooshie is a mask-like silk cloth that covers the face. Dresses also come in different types. The nefnef is a long loose dress, and the thoub is a loose, gauzy dress that is worn on the nefnef. Ne'al and Kabkab, or Karkab, are two kinds of footwear.

=== Fars ===
Khamseh Arab nomads live in eastern Fars province (From Lar and close surrounding areas to Khorrambid and Bavanat). Arabs that live in eastern Fars province and Hormozgan mostly belong to the tribes of Banu Tamim, Banu Kaab and Banu Hammed.

=== Khorasan ===
Khorasani Arabs are descendants of Arab migrants from Arabia. Most Khorasani-Arabs belong to the tribes of Sheybani, Zangooyi, Mishmast, Khozaima and Azdi. According to a 2013 article in peer-reviewed journal Iran and the Caucasus, the Khorasani Arabs, numbering c. 50,000, are "already almost totally Persianised". Very few speak Arabic as their mother tongue. Khorasani-Arabs in the cities Birjand, Mashhad and Nishapur are a small ethnic group, but most are Persianized.

== Demographics ==
Elton Daniel in The History of Iran (Greenwood Press, 2001) states that the Arabs of Iran "are concentrated in the province of Khuzistan and number about half a million." The Historical Dictionary of Iran puts the number at 1 million. Iranian Arabs form over 4% of Iran's population.

== See also ==
- List of Iranian Arabs
- Alavids
- Iraqis in Iran
- Lebanese people in Iran
- Moaved
- Shia Muslims in the Arab world
- Abyssinian–Persian wars
- Arabs in Turkey
- Arab diaspora
- Al-Alam News Network

== Sources ==
- Hajjej, Abdelhafidh; Almawi, Wassim Y.; Arnaiz-Villena, Antonio; Hattab, Lasmar; Hmida, Slama (9 March 2018). "The Genetic Heterogeneity of Arab Populations as Inferred from HLA Genes". PLOS ONE. 13 (3) e0192269. Bibcode:2018PLoSO..1392269H. doi:10.1371/journal.pone.0192269. PMC 5844529. PMID 29522542.
