= Jasem Jaderi =

Iranian politician

- Persian: جاسم جادری
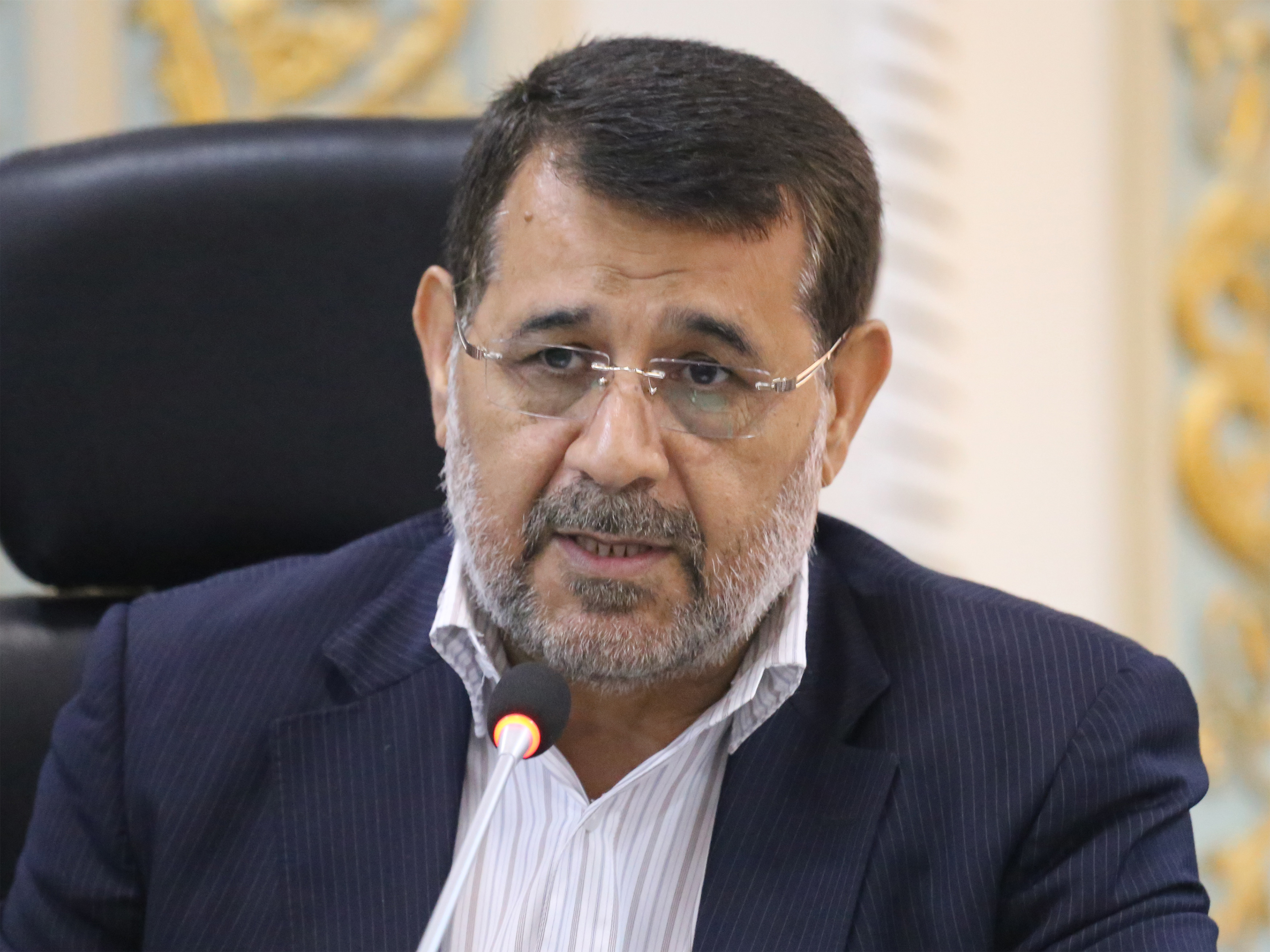

Minister of Mines
- In office 2013–2017
- President: Hassan Rouhani

Governor of Hormozgan Province
- In office 1992–1996

Member of the Islamic Consultative Assembly
- In office 1988–2000

Personal details
- Born: 1 April 1967; Susangerd, Khuzestan Province, Imperial State of Iran
- Died: 20 March 2020 (aged 52)
- Political party: National Trust Party

Jasem Jaderi (Persian: جاسم جادری; 1 April 1967 - 20 March 2020) was an Iranian reformist politician.

Jaderi served as a member of the Islamic Consultative Assembly from 1988 to 2000, as well as the Governor of Hormozgan Province from 1992 to 1996.

From 2013 to 2017 he served in the Government of Hassan Rouhani as Minister of Mines. Jaderi was a member of National Trust Party.

== Personal life ==
Jaderi was born in Susangerd in Khuzestan Province.

He died in 2020 from COVID-19 aged 63.
