= Dowraq =

Dowraq (or Dawraq) was a town located in Khuzestan, 78 km southeast of the city Ahvaz. The town fell into ruins in the 18th century; a new settlement to the south was constructed during this period, known today as Shadegan.

== Sources ==
- Bosworth, C. Edmund (1994). "Dawraq". In Yarshater, Ehsan (ed.). Encyclopædia Iranica. Vol. VII/2: Dastūr al-Afāżel–Dehqān I. London and New York: Routledge & Kegan Paul. p. 159. ISBN 978-1-56859-020-2.
- Floor, Willem (2008). Titles and Emoluments in Safavid Iran: A Third Manual of Safavid Administration, by Mirza Naqi Nasiri. Washington, D.C.: Mage Publishers. ISBN 978-1933823232.
- Sanikidze, George (2021). "The Evolution of the Safavid Policy towards Eastern Georgia". In Melville, Charles (ed.). Safavid Persia in the Age of Empires: The Idea of Iran. Vol. 10. I.B. Tauris. pp. 375–404.
