= Gholamreza Soleimani =

Iranian military officer (1964–2026)

Sardar Gholamreza Soleimani
- غلامرضا سلیمانی
- Soleimani in 2019
- Born: 31 May 1964; Farsan, Pahlavi Iran
- Died: 17 March 2026 (aged 61); Tehran, Iran
- Cause of death: Assassination by airstrike
- Education: University of Isfahan; IRGC University of Command and Staff
- Military career
- Allegiance: Iran
- Branch: (Islamic Revolutionary Guard Corps) IRGC; Basij
- Service years: 1981–2026
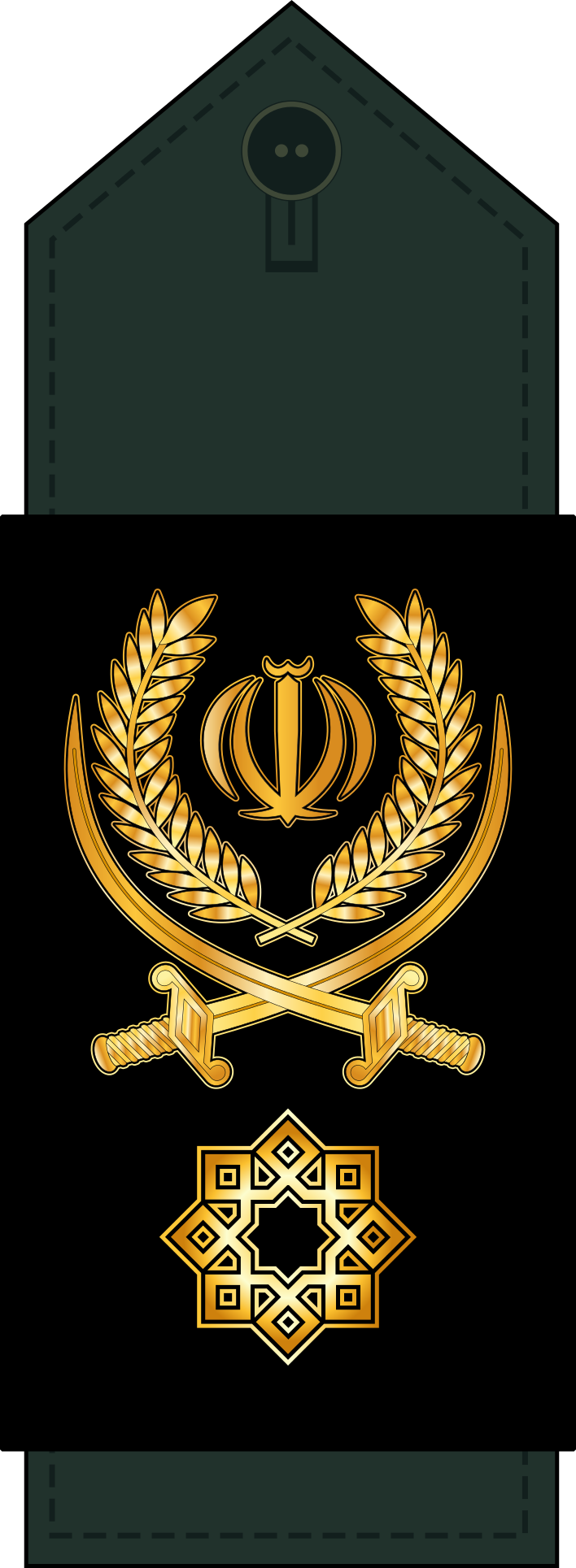
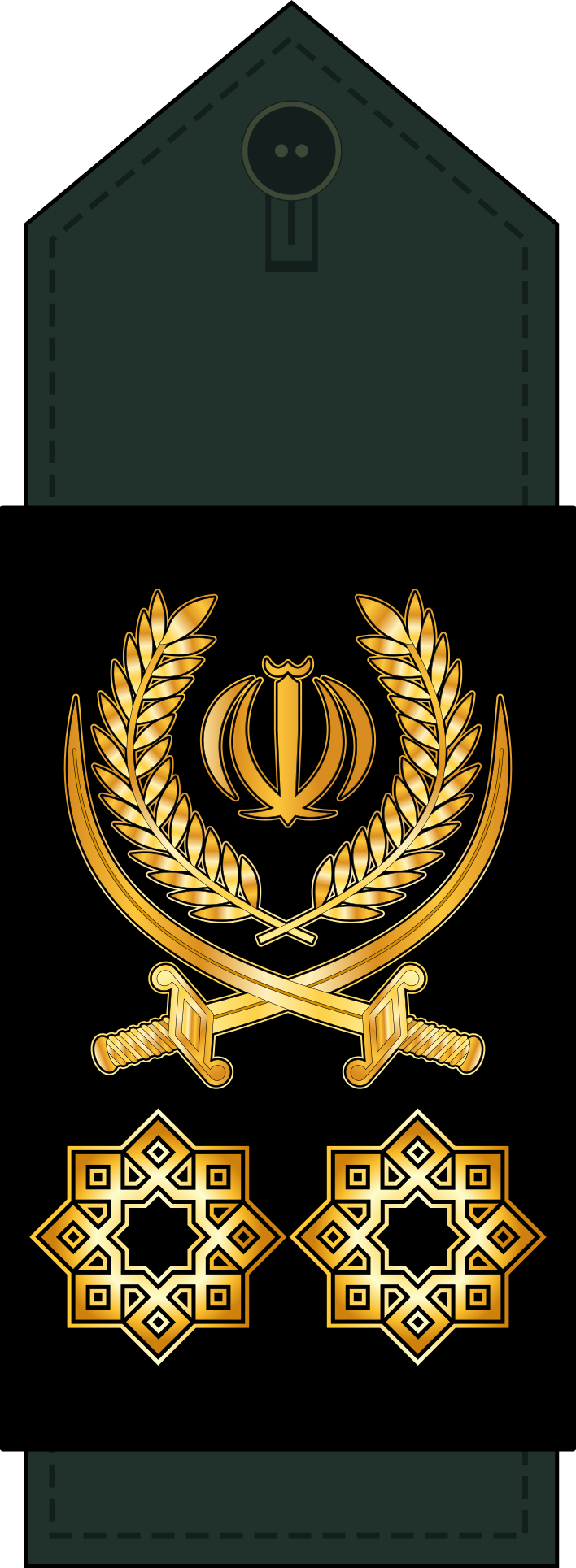
- Rank: Brigadier General; Major General (posthumously)
- Commands: Basij (2019–2026); Isfahan Sahib-az-Zaman Provincial Corps (2008–2019); 14th Imam Hossein Division (2006–2008); 41st Tharallah Division (2004–2006); Quds Headquarters (2004–2006); 19th Fajr Division (2001–2004); 57th Hazrat Abolfazl Brigade (1998–2001); Lorestan province Basij (1998–2001)
- Conflicts: Iran–Iraq War; Twelve-Day War; 2026 Iran war X

Gholamreza Soleimani (Note: Despite having the same surname, he was not related to Qasem Soleimani, the former commander of the IRGC's Quds Force) (Persian: غلامرضا سلیمانی; 31 May 1964 – 17 March 2026) was an Iranian military officer who served as a senior officer in the Iranian Islamic Revolutionary Guard Corps and commander of the paramilitary Basij forces. He was killed during the 2026 Iran war by Israeli strikes.

== Early life and military career ==
Gholamreza Soleimani was born on 31 May 1964 in the city of Farsan, Chaharmahal and Bakhtiari Province, located in southwestern Iran. He began his military career in 1981 as a paramilitary volunteer in the Basij during the Iran–Iraq War, and rose to the rank of company commander and then battalion commander during the war.

He participated in the war's various battles and operations including its notable ones such as Operation Fath ol-Mobin, Operation Beit ol-Moqaddas, Second Battle of Khorramshahr, Operation Ramadan, Battle of the Marshes, and the Siege of Basra.

Soleimani served as the Commander of the Basij Organisation since 2019, giving him significant influence in enforcing the regime’s laws and ideals.

== Education ==
Soleimani received a bachelor's degree in history from the University of Isfahan and completed command and supervision courses at the IRGC University of Command and Staff (IRGC DAFOS). He was also a doctoral student in Iranian history.

== Role in the lethal suppression of protesters ==
As the Commander of the Basij Organization from July 2019 until March 2026, Gholamreza Soleimani directed the paramilitary force’s involvement in several high-fatality crackdowns against Iranian civilians. Under his leadership, the Basij transitioned from a social organization into a primary kinetic force used to terminate domestic unrest through lethal means.

=== November 2019 (Aban 98) ===
Soleimani assumed command shortly before the November 2019 protests, during which the Basij were deployed to use lethal force against demonstrators. Human rights monitors documented that Basij units under his authority utilized snipers on rooftops and heavy machine guns to disperse crowds. In the Mahshahr massacre, Basij and IRGC forces were implicated in the "marshlands massacre," where protesters were fired upon with industrial-grade weaponry. Amnesty International identified the Basij as a primary perpetrator in the deaths of hundreds of individuals, noting a centralized "shoot-to-kill" policy overseen by the command.

=== 2022–2023 "Woman, Life, Freedom" protests ===
During the Mahsa Amini protests, Soleimani’s forces were documented using a "pattern of lethal force." Basij units were deployed with shotguns, assault rifles, and pistols to suppress demonstrations, resulting in over 500 deaths according to the United Nations Fact-Finding Mission on Iran. Soleimani also oversaw the deployment of Basij "security defenders" who allegedly targeted protesters' eyes with metal pellets, leading to hundreds of cases of permanent blinding.

=== 2025–2026 protests ===
In late 2025 and early 2026, Soleimani ordered Basij battalions to use "all necessary means" to clear public squares during a renewed wave of nationwide unrest. Reports from January 2026 indicated a surge in the use of live ammunition by Basij units in provinces such as Sistan and Baluchestan and Kurdistan.

== Sanctions ==
For his role in the brutal repression of civilians, Gholamreza Soleimani was subject to international sanctions from the United Kingdom, Canada, United States, Monaco, and European Union.

United Kingdom – In October 2020, the UK imposed sanctions under the Sanctions and Anti-Money Laundering Act 2018. The measures, which include asset freezes and travel restrictions, were imposed in response to his role in the brutal repression of civilians.

Canada – In October 2022, sanctions were imposed under Canada’s Special Economic Measures (Iran) Regulations, Cited for widespread and systematic violations of human rights during anti-regime demonstrations, the sanctions involve asset freezes, a ban on arms and financial transactions, and a designation that renders him inadmissible to Canada.

United States – In December 2021, the U.S. Treasury added Soleimani to its Specially Designated Nationals (SDN) list under Executive Order 13553 for acting for or on behalf of, directly or indirectly, the Basij. As a result, any assets under U.S. jurisdiction were frozen, and U.S. persons were prohibited from engaging in transactions with him.

EU – In April 2021, Soleimani was sanctioned by the Council of the European Union for his role in the violent crackdown on the November 2019 protests in Iran, which resulted in numerous civilian casualties. The measures included a travel ban and an asset freeze.

== Stance on Israel ==
Gholamreza Soleimani declared that the Islamic Republic would persist in its efforts to eliminate the State of Israel, aligning with the ideological framework known as "the Second Step of the Revolution". According to Soleimani, Jewish hostility toward Islam had existed since the religion's inception.

The Second Step of the Revolution is a concept introduced by Iran's Supreme Leader Ali Khamenei in 2019 to commemorate the 40th anniversary of the Islamic Revolution. The doctrine emphasizes continued resistance to perceived Western and Israeli influence in the region. In a related statement from 2015, Khamenei stated that Israel must be destroyed within 25 years, a remark frequently reiterated by senior Iranian officials.

In regard to the Gaza war, Soleimani claimed in November 2024 that Israel was facing economic collapse due to its ongoing conflict with Hamas in Gaza. He stated that Iran-backed militias, including Hezbollah in Lebanon, continued to engage in near-daily cross-border clashes with Israeli forces. Additional attacks had also been launched against Israel by Iranian-aligned groups operating in Yemen, Syria, and Iraq following Hamas's 7 October 2023 attack. "The Zionist regime has been defeated militarily," Soleimani said, adding that it is a continuation of the revolution of 1979.

He further emphasized the importance of an international media campaign aimed at portraying Israel as a state in irreversible decline. "The world's public opinion must be convinced that this regime has collapsed. We must continuously create and disseminate content in the digital space, spreading the message that the Zionist regime has been defeated".

== Assassination ==
On 17 March 2026, the Israel Defense Forces (IDF) announced that Soleimani was killed in a targeted airstrike in central Tehran, based on precise intelligence. According to the IDF, intelligence provided by local residents led to the strike, which targeted a tent in a wooded area where Soleimani and his deputy, Seyyed Qasem Karishi, were reportedly hiding. Soleimani was killed in the strike, while Karishi survived. Iranian state media later confirmed Soleimani's death.

== See also ==
- List of Iranian officials killed during the 2026 Iran war

== Notes ==
Military offices
Preceded by Gholamhossein Gheybparvar	Head of Basij Organization; 2019–2026	Succeeded by Hossein Taeb
