= List of battles with most Iraqi military fatalities =

This article contains a list of battles and military campaigns with most Iraqi military deaths.

== Introduction ==
This article lists battles and campaigns in which the number of Iraqi military fatalities exceed 1,000. The term casualty in warfare refers to a soldier who is no longer fit to fight after being in combat. Casualties can include killed, wounded, missing, captured or deserted.

== Battles ==
Battle or siege	Conflict	Date	Estimated number killed	Opposing force	References
First Battle of al-Faw	Iran-Iraq War	February 10 to March 10, 1986	10,000 killed (Note: Estimates range from 3,000 to 10,000 killed)	Iran	
Second Battle of Khorramshahr	Iran-Iraq War	April 24 to May 24, 1982	8,000 killed	Iran	
Battle of Baghdad (2003)	Iraq War	April 3 to 9, 2003	2,320 killed (Note: Independent estimates are between 1,700 and 2,120 killed. The figure of 2,320 comes from the American military.)	United States; United Kingdom	
First Battle of Khorramshahr	Iran-Iraq War	September 22 to November 10, 1980	2,000 killed	Iran	
Battle of Mosul (2016–2017)	War in Iraq (2013–2017)	October 16, 2016 to July 20, 2017	1,400 killed (Note: Estimates range from 1,200 to 1,400 killed)	(Islamic State) ISIS	
Highway of Death	Gulf War	February 25 to 27, 1991	over 1,000 killed (Note: Estimates range from 200 to over 1,000 killed)	United States; United Kingdom; Canada; France	

== Campaigns ==
Campaign	Conflict	Date	Estimated number killed	Opposing force	References
2003 invasion of Iraq	Iraq War	March 20 to May 1, 2003	45,000 killed (Note: Estimates range from 11,000 to 45,000 killed)	United States; United Kingdom; Australia; Poland Kurdistan Region; Iraqi National Congress	
Gulf War air campaign	Gulf War	January 17 to February 23, 1991	12,000 killed (Note: Estimates range from 10,000 to 12,000 killed. This figure does not include the 2,000 to 3,000 Iraqi civilians who were killed during the campaign.)	United States; United Kingdom; Saudi Arabia; Canada; France; Italy	
Operation Karbala-5	Iran–Iraq War	January 8 to mid April, 1987	10,000 killed	Iran	
Operation Beit ol-Moqaddas	Iran–Iraq War	April 24 to May 24, 1982	8,000 killed	Iran	
Operation Fath ol-Mobin	Iran–Iraq War	March 22 to March 28, 1982	8,000 killed	Iran	
Operation Dawn 3	Iran–Iraq War	July 30 to August 9, 1983	6,000 killed	Iran	
Operation Ramadan	Iran–Iraq War	July 13 to August 3, 1982	5,000 killed	Iran	
Iraqi invasion of Iran	Iran–Iraq War	September 22 to December 5, 1980	4,000 killed	Iran	
Operation Tariq al-Quds	Iran–Iraq War	November 29 to December 7, 1981	2,500 killed	Iran	
Operation Muslim ibn Aqil	Iran–Iraq War	October 1 to October 7, 1982	2,000 killed	Iran	
