= Operation Dawn-4 =

1983 Iran–Iraq War operation

Operation Dawn 4
- Part of Iran–Iraq War – Northern Front
Date	19 October – mid November 1983 (1 week and 6 days)
Location	Marivan sector, Iraqi Kurdistan
Result	Iranian victory
Territorial changes	Iran captures the strategic Penjwin valley and several villages, an area of 466 square kilometers

Belligerents
Iraq	Iran; Patriotic Union of Kurdistan (PUK)

Strength
108 infantry battalions 7 armoured battalions 1 mechanized battalion 25 commando battalions 8 Republican Guard battalions 7 artillery battalions	Iran: IRGC: 47 infantry battalions 4 armoured battalions 4 mechanized battalion 3 artillery battalions Army: 17 infantry battalions, 8 artillery battalions PUK: Peshmerga partisans

Casualties and losses
2,800 killed 60 tanks and 20 artillery pieces lost	5,000 killed 15,000 wounded

Operation Dawn 4 (Persian: عملیات والفجر 4) was an Iranian operation of the Iran–Iraq War launched in October 1983. At the end of the operation Iran had captured a small amount of territory from the Iraqis.

Units of Iraq's 1st Corps spent two months in their trenches waiting for the Iranians to attack. The offensive began on the 19 October 1983 and the Iranians and Peshmerga guerrillas of the Patriotic Union of Kurdistan conquered about 250 square miles (650 km^{2}) of territory. This included exerted a significant amount of pressure on Penjwen.

Saddam Hussein responded with a counterattack, using the Iraqi Republican Guard and poison gas. However, they failed to dislodge the Iranians, who were dug-in and reinforced by Kurdish fighters.

== The battle ==
The focus of the fourth Dawn operation in October 1983 was the northern sector in Iranian Kurdistan. Three Iranian regular divisions, the Revolutionary Guard, and Kurdistan Democratic Party (KDP) elements amassed in Marivan and Sardasht in a move to threaten the major Iraqi city Suleimaniyah. Iran's strategy was to press Kurdish tribes to occupy the Banjuin Valley, which was within 45 km (28 mi) of Suleimaniyah and 140 km (87 mi) from the oilfields of Kirkuk. To stem the tide, Iraq deployed Mi-8 helicopters equipped with chemical weapons and executed 120 sorties against the Iranian force, which stopped them 15 km (9.3 mi) into Iraqi territory. 5,000 Iranians and 2,800 Iraqis were killed.

Iran regained 110 km^{2} (42 sq mi) of its territory in the north, captured 15 km^{2} (5.8 sq mi) of Iraqi land, and 785 Iraqi prisoners while Iraq abandoned large quantities of valuable weapons and war materiel in the field. Iraq responded to these losses by firing a series of SCUD-B missiles into the cities of Dezful, Masjid Suleiman, and Behbehan, while the Iraqi naval aircraft mined the port of Bandar Khomeini. Iran's use of artillery against Basra while the battles in the north raged created multiple fronts, which effectively confused and wore down Iraq.

== Aftermath ==
The attack was successful but the Iranians suffered high casualties due to Iraqi gas attacks. Unlike other operations and battles of the Iran–Iraq War, environmental conditions and operative restrictions were of high significance for this operation. Also the military medicine organization of the Pasdaran was important in this battle; they used special methods to save the wounded and carried out rescue operations.

However, in response to this victory, the Iraqis launched the first Scud missiles into Iran, hitting six cities.

== Units ==
=== Iran ===
Islamic Revolutionary Guard Corps:

Hamzeh Sayyed-osh-Shohada Headquarters
- 31st Ashura Division
  Commanded by Mehdi Bakeri
- 44th Qamar-e Bani-Hashem Brigade
- 41st Tharallah Division
  Commanded by Qasem Soleimani
- 17th Ali ibn Abi Taleb Division
  Commanded by Mehdi Zeinoddin
- 25th Karbala Division
  Commanded by Morteza Ghorbani
- 14th Imam Hossein Division
  Commanded by Hossein Kharrazi
- 8th Najaf Ashraf Division
  Commanded by Ahmad Kazemi

Islamic Republic of Iran Army Ground Forces

- 28th Infantry Division of Kordestan
- 21st Hamzeh Division of Azarbaijan

=== Iraq ===
- Iraqi Army
- Republican Guard
- Iraqi Army Air Corps
- Iraqi Air Force

== See also ==
- Operation Dawn 2
- Operation Karbala Ten
- Iran–Iraq War#List of major Iranian operations during the war

== Bibliography ==
- http://smallwarsjournal.com/jrnl/art/the-“dawn-of-victory”-campaigns-to-the-“final-push”-part-three-of-three
