= Masoud Monfared Niyaki =

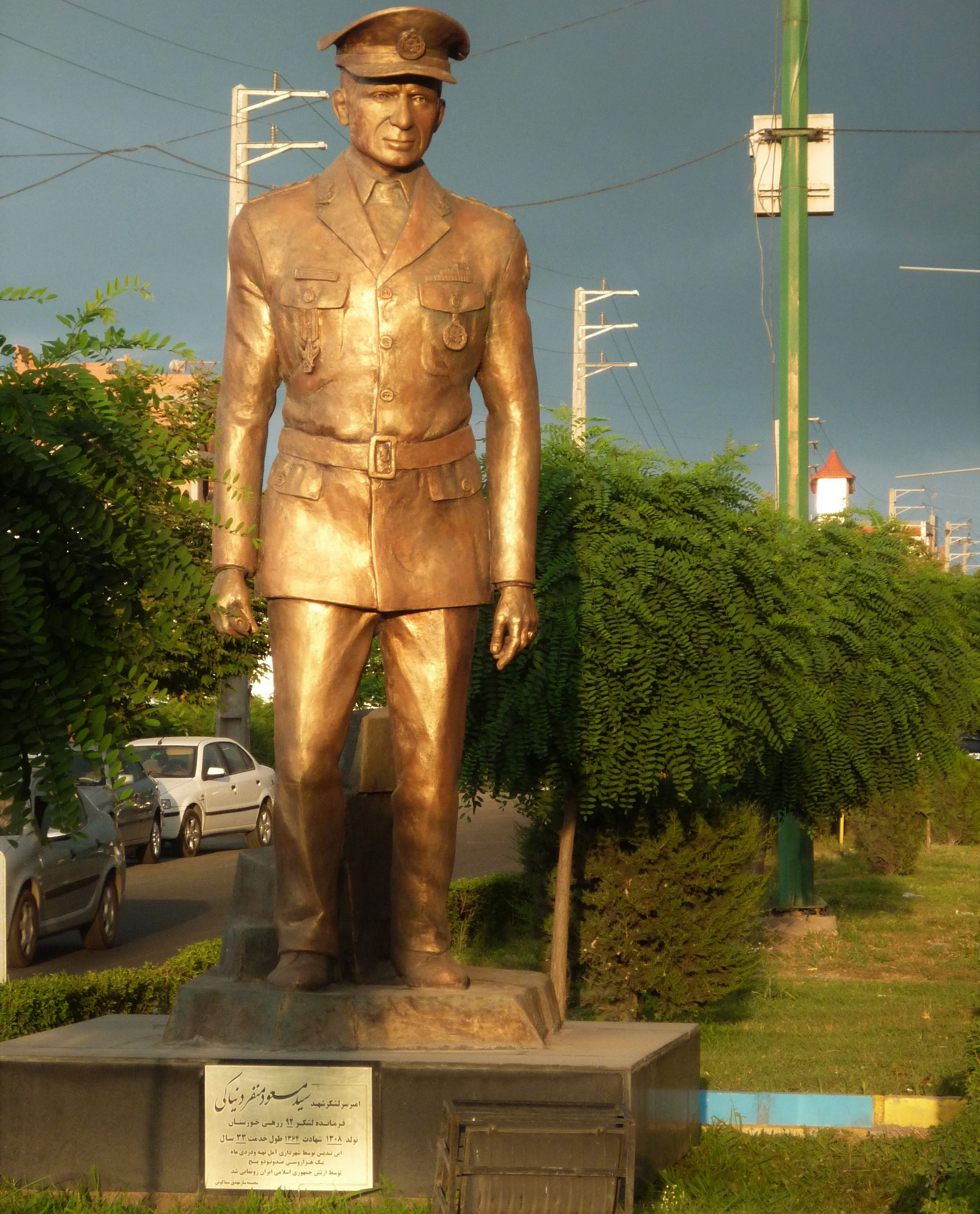
- Born: 7 February 1930; Amol, Mazandaran province, Imperial State of Persia
- Died: 28 July 1985 (aged 55); Karaj, Tehran province, Iran
- Burial place: Behesht-e Zahra Cemetery
- Spouse: Maliheh Safar-Beyglu
- Military career
- Allegiance: Imperial State of Iran (1952–1979); Islamic Republic of Iran (1979–1985)
- Branch: Iran Army Ground Forces
- Service years: 1952–1985
- Rank: Major General
- Commands: 88nd Armored Division of Zahedan; 92nd Armored Division of Ahvaz; Fath Headquarters
- Conflicts: Iran–Iraq War; Operation Beit ol-Moqaddas; Operation Tariq al-Qods; Operation Fath ol-Mobin; Operation Ramadan; Operation Before the Dawn; Liberation of Khorramshahr
- Awards: 1st grade Fath Medal

Major General Masoud Monfared Niyaki or Monfared Niaki (1929–1985) (Persian: مسعود منفرد نیاکی) was an Iranian military officer. He studied in the Officers' School, specializing in armored warfare. Niyaki received the rank of colonel in 1976. He was active during the Iran–Iraq war, including Operation Tariq al-Qods, Operation Fath ol-Mobin, Operation Beit ol-Moqaddas, Operation Dawn, and Operation Ramadan. He was the commander of the 92nd Armored Division and the 88th Armored Division. He was killed during a war game conducted by 58th Zolfaghar Takavar Division.

== In popular culture ==
Footstep of the Oldman (Persian: ردپای پیر), written by Alireza Poorbozorg in 170 pages, is a biography of Massoud Monfared Niyaki.

The Last Chapter of Love (Persian: آخرین فصل عشق) was a documentary film about Monfared Niyaki broadcast by IRIB 3.
