= Operation Beit ol-Moqaddas =

1982 Iran–Iraq War operation

- Part of Iran–Iraq War
Date	24 April – 24 May 1982 (1 month)
Location	Khuzestan, South-West Iran
Result	Iranian victory
Territorial changes	The Iranians liberate Khorramshahr and the town of Hoveyzeh as well as multiple villages, around 4,500 km^{2} overall, and push Iraqi forces to the international border.

Belligerents
Iraq	Iran

Commanders and leaders
(Iraq) Ahmad Zeidan † (Iraq) Salah al-Qadhi (executed) (Iraq) Juwad Shitnah (Iraq) Musin Jali (POW)	(Iran) Mohsen Rezaee (Iran) Col. Ali Sayad Shirazi (Iran) Gholam Ali Rashid (Iran) Col. Massoud Monfared Niyaki (Iran) Hassan Baqer (Iran) Col. Hossein Hassani Sa'di (Iran) Ahmad Gholampoor (Iran) Col. Siroos Lotfi

Strength
65,000 troops: 90 infantry battalions 43 armored battalions 23 mechanized battalions 22 commando battalions 12 border guard battalions 30 artillery battalions 500 tanks, 500 APCs and 500 artillery pieces	200,000 troops: 112 infantry battalions 23 armored battalions 9 mechanized battalions 29 artillery battalions 5 combat engineer battalions 1 pontoon bridge battalion 4 army aviation units (96 helicopters); 700–1,000 tanks ≈600 artillery pieces

Casualties and losses
8,000 killed 15,000 wounded 19,000 captured 250 tanks, 300 APCs, 100 artillery pieces destroyed or captured	12,000–15,000 killed 25,000 wounded 400 tanks destroyed

Operation Beit-ol-Moqaddas (Persian: عملیات بیت‌المقدس; Operation Jerusalem), also known as the Operation Toward Beit-ol-Moqaddas (عملیات الی بیت‌المقدس), was an Iranian operation conducted during the Iran–Iraq War. The operation was a success, as it achieved its standing aim of liberating Khorramshahr and pushed Iraqi troops back to the border. This operation, coupled with Operation Tariq-ol-Qods, and Operation Fath-ol-Mobin, succeeded in evicting Iraqi troops from southern Iran and gave Iran the momentum, making them extremely significant events.

== Prelude ==
On 22 September 1980, because of threats from Khomeini's regime, leading to the abrogation of the 1975 Algiers Agreement, Iraqi President Saddam Hussein declared war against Iran and launched a land invasion of southern Iran, although operations did occur elsewhere on the Iran–Iraq border. After achieving successes due to the post-Revolution military and political chaos in Iran, Saddam Hussein ordered that the Iraqi troops "dig-in" on the front line. He hoped that this would show the world that he cared about the fate of the Iranian people, and that he was only concerned with achieving his aim of securing the entire Shatt al-Arab waterway, which had been resolved since the 1975 Algiers Agreement, but was disputed again since the treaty was abrogated due to Iran's actions. However, since the Islamic Revolution of Iran in 1979, Iraq had felt that it was necessary to assume what it wanted through force, since previous attempts in getting the revolutionary Iranian government to negotiate a new settlement had proved fruitless, due to Iran's foreign policy.

Once the Iraqi forces had settled, the Iranians were planning a series of operations designed to evict the Iraqis from southern Iran, of which Operation Tariq al-Qods was one.

== Battle ==
The Iranians attacked, with some 70,000 soldiers in the Ahvaz–Susangerd area. The Iraqi forces in the area withdrew, and strengthened the defenses of Khorramshahr.

The Iraqis launched a counter-offensive on 20 May. However, despite its scale, the Iranians were able to repulse the attack.

On 24 May, the Iranians liberated Khorramshahr; the strategic and symbolic Iranian city whose capture by Iraq had been the low-point of Iranian fortunes in the early days of the war.

The Iraqis were ordered to retreat, although many had done so when Khorramshahr had fallen, back into Iraq. The Iranians captured 15,000-19,000 Iraqi troops and a substantial amount of Iraqi military hardware in Khorramshahr.

The commander of the Iraqi forces in the city, Colonel Ahmad Zeidan, attempted to flee, but was trapped in a minefield which previously had been set up on his orders, and killed when he stepped on a mine.

== Units ==
=== Iran ===
Iranian units involved in the operation were as follows: Each IRGC battalion was consisted of 300 Basij volunteers at most, while each Army battalion was around 2.5 times bigger. However, the number of battalions in each IRGC brigade was bigger than those of the Army.

Karbala Central Headquarters
Commanded by Mohsen Rezaee (IRGC commander) and Col. Ali Sayyad Shirazi (Army commander)

- Fath Headquarters
  Commanded by Gholam Ali Rashid and Col. Massoud Monfared Niyaki
  - IRGC:
    - 3rd Fath Division
      - 14th Imam Hossein Brigade (1st Fath)
        Commanded by Hossein Kharrazi
        - 7 infantry battalions
      - 8th Najaf Ashraf Brigade (3rd Fath)
        Commanded by Ahmad Kazemi
        - 7 infantry battalions
      - 25th Karbala Brigade (4th Fath)
        Commanded by Morteza Ghorbani
        - 7 infantry battalions
    - Two battalions from 30th Armored Brigade
  - Army:
    - 92nd Armored Division of Khuzestan
      - 1st Brigade (1st Fath)
      - 2nd Brigade (2nd Fath) (backup)
      - 3rd Brigade (3rd Fath)
    - 37th Armored Brigade of Shiraz (4th Fath)
    - 55th Airborne Brigade of Shiraz (4th Fath)
    - 151st Battalion (4th Fath)
    - 8 artillery battalions
  - Combat engineering (Commanded by Col. Jalal Rajabi-Rad): 85 engineering vehicles overall (45 from Jihad of Construction, 22 from IRGC, 18 from Army)
- Nasr Headquarters
  Commanded by Hassan Baqeri and Col. Hossein Hassani Saadi
  - IRGC:
    - 5th Nasr Division
      - 7th Vali-e-Asr Brigade (1st Nasr)
        Commanded by Abdol-Mohammad Raoofi-Nezhad
      - 27th Mohammad Rasulullah Brigade (2nd Nasr)
        Commanded by Ahmad Motevasselian
      - 46th Fajr Brigade (3rd Nasr)
      - 22nd Badr Brigade (5th Nasr)
    - One battalion from 30th Armored Brigade
  - Army:
    - 21st Hamzeh Infantry Division of Azarbaijan
      - 1st Brigade (1st Nasr)
      - 2nd Brigade (2nd Nasr)
      - 3rd Brigade (3rd Nasr)
      - 4th Brigade (4th Nasr) (backup)
    - 23rd Airborne Special Forces Brigade (Nowhed) (5th Nasr)
    - 6 artillery battalions
  - Combat engineering: 48 engineering vehicles overall (27 from Jihad of Construction, 18 from IRGC, 3 from Army)
- Qods Headquarters
  Commanded by Ahmad Gholampoor and Col. Siroos Lotfi
  - IRGC:
    - 1st Qods Division
      - 31st Ashura Brigade (1st Qods)
        Commanded by Mehdi Bakeri
        - 7 infantry battalions
      - 21st Imam Reza Brigade (2nd Qods)
        - 8 infantry battalions
      - 37th Noor Brigade (3rd Qods)
        Commanded by Ali Hashemi
        - 8 infantry battalions
      - 41st Tharallah Brigade (4th Qods)
        Commanded by Qasem Soleimani
        - 7 infantry battalions
      - 43rd Beit-ol-Moqaddas Brigade (5th Qods)
        - 8 infantry battalions
    - One tank battalion from 30th Armored Brigade
  - Army:
    - 16th Armored Division of Qazvin
      - 1st Brigade (1st Qods)
        - 2 tank battalions, 2 mechanized battalions
      - 2nd Brigade (2nd Qods)
        - 2 tank battalions, 2 mechanized battalions
      - 3rd Brigade (3rd Qods)
        - 2 tank battalions, 1 mechanized battalion
    - 58th Zolfaqar Commando Brigade of Shahroud (4th Qods)
      - 4 infantry battalions, 1 tank battalion
    - 254th Tank Battalion (5th Qods)
      - 1 company
    - 6 artillery battalions
  - Combat engineering: 59 engineering vehicles overall (23 from Jihad of Construction, 22 from IRGC, 14 from Army)
- Fajr Headquarters (backup)
  - IRGC:
    - 17th Ali ibn Abi Taleb Brigade
    - 33rd Al-Mahdi Brigade
    - 35th Imam Sajjad Brigade
  - Army:
    - 77th Infantry Division of Khorasan
      - 3rd Brigade

Combat engineer units involved were as follows:

- Army: 63 engineering vehicles overall
  - Combat Engineer Battalion of 21st Division
  - Combat Engineer Battalion of 92nd Division
  - Combat Engineer Battalion of 16th Division
  - 411th Combat Engineer Group of Borujerd
    - 422nd Pontoon Bridge Group of Daghagheleh, Ahvaz
  - 411th Pontoon Bridge Battalion
  - 414th Combat Engineer Battalion
    - Zafar Company
- IRGC: 60 engineering vehicles overall
- Jihad of Construction: 100 engineering vehicles overall

Other forces included:

- Islamic Republic of Iran Air Force: The IRIAF conducted 2,161 sorties overall. Air support duties were performed using 2 surface-to-surface missile bases together with F-4 Phantom II and F-14 Tomcat fighter jets. 20 sorties were conducted in the first day and 6 sorties in other days as close air support. 3 airbases were dedicated to medical evacuation duties, with 12-20 sorties per day.
- Islamic Republic of Iran Army Aviation (Havanirooz): 96 helicopters were involved, including (sources differ on numbers): 24-26 Bell AH-1J International, 22-32 Bell 214, 6-16 Boeing CH-47C Chinook, 16-32 Bell 206 helicopters
- Islamic Republic of Iran Navy's Takavar units
- Islamic Republic of Iran Air Defense Force

=== Iraq ===
Iraqi units involved in the operation were as follows:

- 3rd Armored Division
  Commanded by Brig. Gen. Jawad Asaad Shitnah (executed)
  - 6th Armored Brigade
  - 12th Armored Brigade
    Commanded by Muhsin Abd al-Jalil (executed)
  - 53rd Armored Brigade
  - 8th Mechanized Brigade
- 6th Armored Division
  - 16th Armored Brigade
  - 30th Armored Brigade
  - 25th Mechanized Brigade
- 7th Armored Division
- 9th Armored Division
  - 35th Armored Brigade
  - 43rd Armored Brigade
  - 14th Mechanized Brigade
- 12th Armored Division
  - 37th Armored Brigade
  - 46th Mechanized Brigade
- 10th Armored Division
  - 17th Armored Brigade
  - 24th Mechanized Brigade
- 5th Mechanized Division
  - 26th Armored Brigade
  - 55th Armored Brigade
  - 15th Mechanized Brigade
  - 20th Mechanized Brigade
- 11th Infantry Division
  - 44th Infantry Brigade
  - 48th Infantry Brigade
  - 49th Infantry Brigade
  - 22nd Infantry Brigade
  - 45th Infantry Brigade
  - 113th Infantry Brigade
- 7th Infantry Division (I Corps)
  - 19th Infantry Brigade
  - 39th Infantry Brigade
- 15th Infantry Division
- 10th Independent Armored Brigade
- 31st, 32nd, 33rd, 416th, 417th, 601st, 602nd, 603rd, 119th Special Forces Brigades
- Republican Guards:
  - 10th Armored Brigade
- 109th, 419th, 416th, 90th, 417th, 601st, 602nd, 605th, 606th, 409th, 238th, & 501st Independent Infantry Brigades
- 9th, 10th, 20th, 113th Border Guard Brigades
- 33rd Special Forces Brigade
- Thirty commando companies
- Popular Army:
  - 10 battalions (qati`), 450 fighters each
- Saif Saad Independent Tank Battalion
- Hattin, Salah al-Din & Hanin reconnaissance battalions
- Thirty artillery battalions
- Iraqi Air Force
- Iraqi Army Air Corps
