= Operation Tariq al-Quds =

1981 Iran–Iraq War operation

Coordinates: 31.7315°N 48.0418°E

Liberation of Bostan (codenamed Operation Tariq al-Quds)
- Part of Iran–Iraq War
Date	29 November – 7 December 1981 (1 week and 1 day)
Location	Dasht-e-Azadegan, Bostan and west of Susangerd, in Khuzestan, South-West Iran
Result	Iranian victory
Territorial changes	Iran retakes Bostan area (800 km^{2}). Iran also retakes Chazabeh border checkpoint, reaching Hawizeh Marshes, threatening to cut off Iraqi forces at Susangerd.

Belligerents
Iraq	Iran

Commanders and leaders
(Ba'athist Iraq) Saddam Hussein (President of Iraq)	(Iran) Hossein Kharrazi (Iran) Mohammad Boroujerdi (Iran) Gholam Ali Rashid (Iran) Massoud Monfared Niyaki

Strength
Unknown	≈20,000; 60 tanks

Casualties and losses
1,500–2,500 killed 170 tanks and APCs, 200 vehicles, 13 aircraft, 4 helicopters destroyed. 15 tanks and APCs, 250 vehicles, 30 anti-aircraft pieces, 19 artillery pieces, 12 loaders and bulldozers captured.	2,500–6,000 killed Dozens of armored vehicles Several AH-1J Cobra helicopters

The Liberation of Bostan, that codenamed Operation Tariq al-Quds (Persian: عملیات طریق القدس, meaning "Operation Path to Jerusalem") was a military operation launched by Iran during the Iran–Iraq War to free Bostan in the Khuzestan province. It was fought from 29 November to 7 December 1981 and was carried out jointly by the Iranian Army and the Islamic Revolutionary Guard Corps (IRGC).

The operation resulted in the liberation of Bostan and 70 villages. The news of Bostan's liberation was the first such news released during the war. It was labeled by Ayatollah Khomeini, Iran's leader at the time, as "the victory of victories".

== Before the battle ==
Iran initially tried to regain control over Bostan in August 1981 but was not successful.

=== Operation planning ===
The operation was designed by two independent groups affiliated with IRGC and the Iranian army, respectively under the supervision of Mohsen Rezaei and Ali Sayyad Shirazi. The planning groups selected Dashte-e Azadegan zone for the operation, where Iranian troops would require less forces and equipment for victory. Moreover, the area included the Chazabeh border terminal, whose capture could divide the Iraqi forces located in the north and south of Khuzestan province. More reconnaissance was then carried out before the operation.

=== Reconnaissance ===
The reconnaissance operations were carried out under the observation of Hassan Baqeri. According to one of the reconnaissance forces, the Iraqi troops in the operation zone were watched on an hourly basis. After reviewing the reports issued by the operation intelligence unit, Baqeri advised the attack be conducted via Chazabeh, which was a sandy and impassable route. The suggestion was rejected initially by army commanders, but was later accepted. To increase the possibility of victory, Jihad of Construction constructed a 9 km road, allowing a substantial number of the Iranian troops on the northern flank of the Iraqi defenses.

== The battle ==
The operation was launched on 29 November 1981 and lasted more than a week. Sixty tanks and 20,000 soldiers were dispatched towards Bostan for the operation. The Iranians used human wave attacks in their offensive for the first time in the war. Around 13,000 Iranian troops fought in the operation, more than half of which were IRGC forces. During the operation, Iran lost 6,000 troops, more than twice as many men as the Iraqis (2,500). However, the attrition rate was in Iran's favor, as it was able to eliminate an important supply route. This was critical because Iraq did not have enough soldiers for a long front line. After almost 36 hours, the Iranian troops retook Bostan and repelled the Iraqi forces away towards the west by several kilometers.

=== Iranian attack ===
On the evening of 28 November, as it became dark, intelligence forces used lanterns to mark the newly constructed road through Chazabeh strait. Five minutes after midnight on 29 November, the commanders announced "Ya Hossein" ("O Hossein !"), signaling the start of the operation. The attack was carried out via two columns, one on the north axis and one on the south. In the north, the Iranian troops reached Iraq's artillery unit before they woke up, and after an intense fight the Iranian side won the battle. In the south, Iraqi troops were higher in numbers, making the fight more difficult for the Iranians. Hence, some of the north forces were dispatched to south. Bostan was liberated on the morning of 29 November and the news was sent to Tehran, marking the first news about the liberation of a city during the Iran-Iraq war. Iraqi forces had not expected an attack due to the poor conditions.

=== Iraqi counterattack ===
Iraqi forces conducted a counterattack in the south. After three days of fighting, the counterattack was defeated by the Iranians. On 6 November, Iranian forces were surprised by Iraqi commandos trying to cross the Saboleh bridge. Seven Iraqi tanks passed over the bridge, threatening Bostan. The two sides exchanged fire and the Iraqi tanks were captured by Iran, leading to an Iraqi retreat.

== Order of battle ==
=== Iran ===
The following was the order of battle by the Iranian troops:

- Ground Forces of Islamic Republic of Iran Army:
  - 16th Armored Division of Qazvin
    - 1st Brigade
    - 2nd Brigade
  - 92nd Armored Division of Ahvaz
    - 3rd Brigade
  - 77th Infantry Division of Khorasan
    - 1st Brigade
  - 8 artillery battalions
- Pasdaran:
  Commanded by Gholam Ali Rashid
  - 1st Ashura Brigade
    - 9 infantry battalions
  - 2nd Karbala Brigade
    Commanded by Morteza Ghorbani
    - 3 infantry battalions
  - 3rd Imam Hossein Brigade
    Commanded by Hosein Kharrazi
    - 8 infantry battalions
  - 34th Imam Sajjad Brigade
  - Imam Hassan Brigade (backup)
    - 3 infantry battalions
- Islamic Republic of Iran Gendarmerie
  - 1 battalion
- Islamic Republic of Iran Air Force
- Islamic Republic of Iran Army Aviation

=== Iraq ===
The Iraqi order of battle at the onset of the operation was as follows:

- 321st Artillery Battalion
- 330th Artillery Battalion
- 355th Artillery Battalion
- 368th Artillery Battalion
- 382nd Artillery Battalion
- 390th Artillery Battalion
  - 1 artillery battery
- 362nd Artillery Battalion
  - 2 artillery batteries
- Iraqi Air Force
  - Iraqi Air Defense Command

North of Karkheh:

- 5th Division
  - 26th Armored Brigade
- 8th Mountain Infantry Division
  - 23rd Brigade
    - 1st Infantry Battalion
- 4th Mountain Infantry Division
  - 93rd Infantry Brigade
- 422nd Infantry Brigade
- 31st Special Forces Brigade
- 32nd Special Forces Brigade
- Popular Army
  - Al-Mahmoudiyah and Islam units

South of Karkheh:

- 6th Armored Division
  - 25th Mechanized Brigade
  - 16th Armored Brigade
  - 30th Armored Brigade
  - 96th Armored Brigade
- 11th Infantry Division
  - 48th Infantry Brigade
- 3rd Armored Division
  - 12th Armored Brigade
    - Qadisiyyah Tank Battalion
    - Qutaibah Tank Battalion
    - Mu'tasim Tank Battalion
    - 3rd Mechanized Battalion
- 32nd Special Forces Brigade
  - 1 battalion
- 20th Difaa al-Wajibat Battalion
- 7th Infantry Division
  - Commando units
- Popular Army
  - Islam unit

== See also ==
- Operation Quds-1
- Operation Beit ol-Moqaddas
