= Husayn Kharrazi =

Iranian military commander (1957–1987)

Sardar Hossein Kharrazi
- حسین خرازی
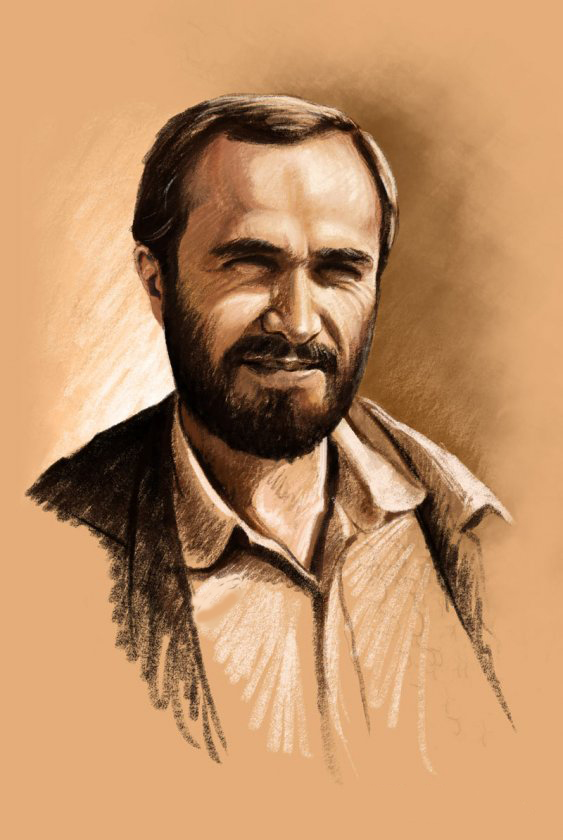
- An illustration of Kharrazi's portrait
- Born: Hossein Kharrazi; 23 August 1957; Isfahan, Pahlavi Iran
- Died: 27 February 1987 (aged 29); Shatt Al-Arab District, Basra Governorate, Ba'athist Iraq
- Burial place: Golestan Shohada, Isfahan; 32.6275°N 51.683056°E
- Military career
- Allegiance: Pahlavi Iran (1977–1979); Iran (1979–1987)
- Service: Imperial Iranian Ground Force; Islamic Revolutionary Committees; Islamic Revolutionary Guard Corps
- Service years: 1977–1987
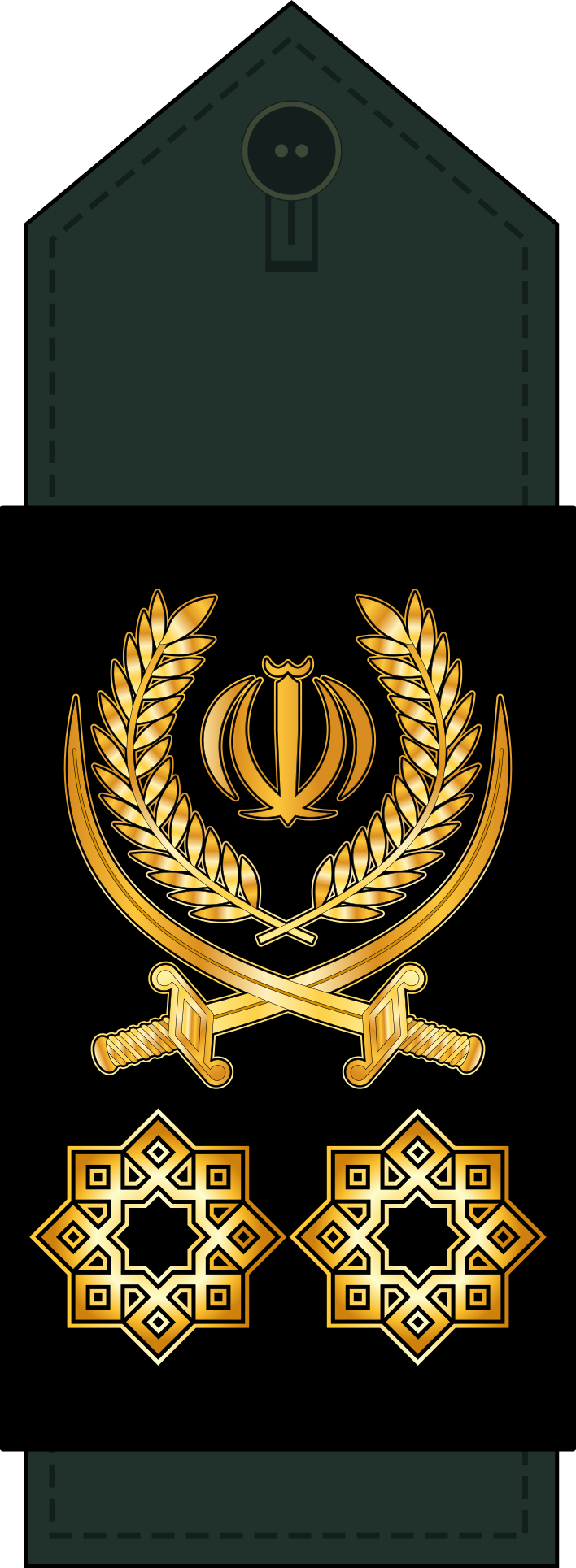
- Rank: Major General (posthumously)
- Unit: 77th Infantry Division (1977–1979)
- Commands: 14th Imam Hossein Division (1981–1987)
- Conflicts: Dhofar rebellion; 1979 Kurdish rebellion in Iran; Iran–Iraq War; Operation Tariq al-Quds; Operation Fath ol-Mobin; Operation Beit ol-Moqaddas; Operation Ramadan; Operation Dawn-4; Battle of the Marshes (WIA); Operation Kheibar; First Battle of al-Faw; Operation Dawn 8; Operation Karbala-4; Operation Karbala-5 †
- Awards: Order of Fath (2nd Class)

Hossein Kharrazi Dehkordi (Persian: حسین خرازی دهکردی) (23 August 1957 – 27 February 1987) was an Iranian military officer who served as the commander of the IRGC's 14th Imam Hossein Division during the Iran–Iraq War. A partisan of the Iranian Revolution and notable commander in the Iran–Iraq War, Kharrazi participated in many battles and operations during the war, notably the First Battle of al-Faw, which resulted in the capture of Iraq's Al-Faw peninsula. In the Siege of Basra (also known as Operation Karbala 5), Kharrazi served as commander of the vanguard forces, and was killed by shrapnel from a mortar shell during the battle.

== Early life and army service ==
During his adolescence he was interested in religious publications. Kharrazi participated in religious congregations and learning theological subjects. His curiosity toward religious matters increased during the campaigns against the Pahlavis and he became more aware of the contemporary political circumstances. While performing his military service, Kharrazi was sent to Dhofar. He deserted the armed forces finally in 1978, according to the direction of Ruhollah Khomeini, and joined the revolutionaries.

== Iran–Iraq War ==
His first considerable command was in Darkhovin region close to Abadan–Ahvaz road, known as "The Lion Frontier". In the battle, the Iranian troops resisted Saddam's army for 9 months. He became the commander of Darkhovin front. Kharrazi served actively in freeing Bostan afterwards. Following Operation Tariq al-Quds, Imam Hussein Brigade was established which soon was reorganized to a division with Kharrazi being appointed as the Major General. His troops participated in the operations Fath ol-Mobin and Beit ol-Moqaddas (which liberated Khorramshahr). In the later operation, his division was among the first which passed Karun river and reached Ahvaz–Khorramshahr road. As a commander he was also involved in other operations like Ramadan, Before the Dawn, Dawn-4; and Kheibar during which he lost an arm. He often reconnoitered combatant's territories himself. In Operation Dawn 8, his troops managed to defeat Saddam's Republican Guard and had victories in Al-Faw peninsula and around "Salt Factory". During Operation Karbala-5, Kharrazi's division was the spearhead and succeeded to pass arched embankments of the combatant army. He was incredibly popular among Iranian fighters.

"Karbala-5" was his last operation. Under the heavy artillery bombardment of Saddam's forces, food supplies became critical. He took the direct responsibility of providing food. Kharrazi was a staunch adherent of the ideals of the Islamic Revolution. However, senior commanders criticized him for taking towns in excess of their requests and on his own initiative. Kharrazi believed that the Iran–Iraq War could have been over in a week, had he not been held back by the Iranian command.

He was killed in action by shrapnel from a mortar bomb during battle in Operation Karbala-5 in 1987.

== See also ==
- Iranian leaders of the Iran–Iraq War
- Basij
- Hassan Bagheri

Military offices
New title	Commander of the 14th Imam Hossein Division; 1981–1987	Succeeded by Mohammad Reza Zahedi
