= 14th Imam Hossein Division =

14th Imam Hossein Brigade
- لشکر 14 امام حسین (ع)
- Active: 1979–present
- Country: Islamic Republic of Iran
- Branch: Islamic Revolutionary Guard Corps
- Type: Infantry
- Size: Division
- Garrison/HQ: Isfahan
- Nickname: "Imam Hossein" (امام حسین (ع))
- Engagements: Iran–Iraq War; Operation Commander-in-Chief; Operation Samen-ol-A'emeh; Operation Tarigh ol-Qods; Operation Fath ol-Mobeen; Operation Beit ol-Moqaddas; Second Battle of Khorramshahr; First Battle of al-Faw; Operation Dawn 8

Commanders
- Notable commanders: Hossein Kharrazi; Mostafa Raddanipoor; Mohammad Reza Zahedi

14th Imam Hossein Division (Persian: لشکر 14 امام حسین (ع)) is a division of the Islamic Revolutionary Guard Corps (IRGC).

It was first officially organized as the 3rd Imam Hossein Brigade during the Iran–Iraq War, just before Operation Tariq al-Qods. Its units had participated in various rebellions in Iran after the 1979 Revolution, and the soldiers of the division were predominantly from the Isfahan Province. It was later expanded into a division. It participated in various key operations and battles in the Iran-Iraq war.

Describing the IRGC units during the Iran-Iraq war, then-commander-in-chief of IRGC Mohsen Rezaee says:

We had four divisions that, anywhere they went, no [Iraqi] military force was able to resist against them. Haj Hemmat and [his] 27th Mohammad Rasulullah Division, Hossein Kharrazi and [his] 14th Imam Hossein Division, Mehdi Bakeri and [his] 31st Ashura Division, Ahmad Kazemi and [his] 8th Najaf Division—which whenever they entered, it resulted in success without exception.

== History ==
This division was originally known as the 3rd Imam Hussein Brigade and was among the first combat units of the IRGC. It was formed during Operation Tariq al-Quds under the command of Hussein Kharrazi and was later expanded and upgraded to a division as the organization grew.

== Operations ==
Hossein Kharrazi was the first commander of the 14th Imam Hussein Division during the Iran–Iraq War. The division took part in numerous major operations, including Tariq al-Quds, Fath al-Mubin, Bayt al-Maqdis, Ramadan, Preliminary Val-Fajr, Val-Fajr 1, 2, 4, and 8, Khaybar, Badr, Karbala 3, 4, 5, 10, Bayt al-Maqdis 7, Nasr 4, and Val-Fajr 10.

== Tasks ==
After the Iran–Iraq War, several new responsibilities were assigned to this division, including border protection as well as the construction and reconstruction of schools and housing in underprivileged areas.

== Commanders ==
- Hossein Kharrazi (Established-1987)
- Mohammad Reza Zahedi (1987–1992)
- Morteza Ghorbani (1992–1999)
- Ahmad Kazemi (1999–2000)
- Javad Astaki (2000–2004)
- Abdullah Iraqi (2004–2006)
- Gholam Reza Soleimani (2006–2008)
- Morteza Hesamzadeh (2008–2012)
- Asghar Arabpour (2012–2019)
- Mohammad Hashemipour (2019–2024)
- Hassan Amini Harandi (2024- present)
