= Operation Fath ol-Mobin =

1982 Iran–Iraq War operation

Battle of Shush (Operation Fath ol-Mobin)
- Part of Iran–Iraq War
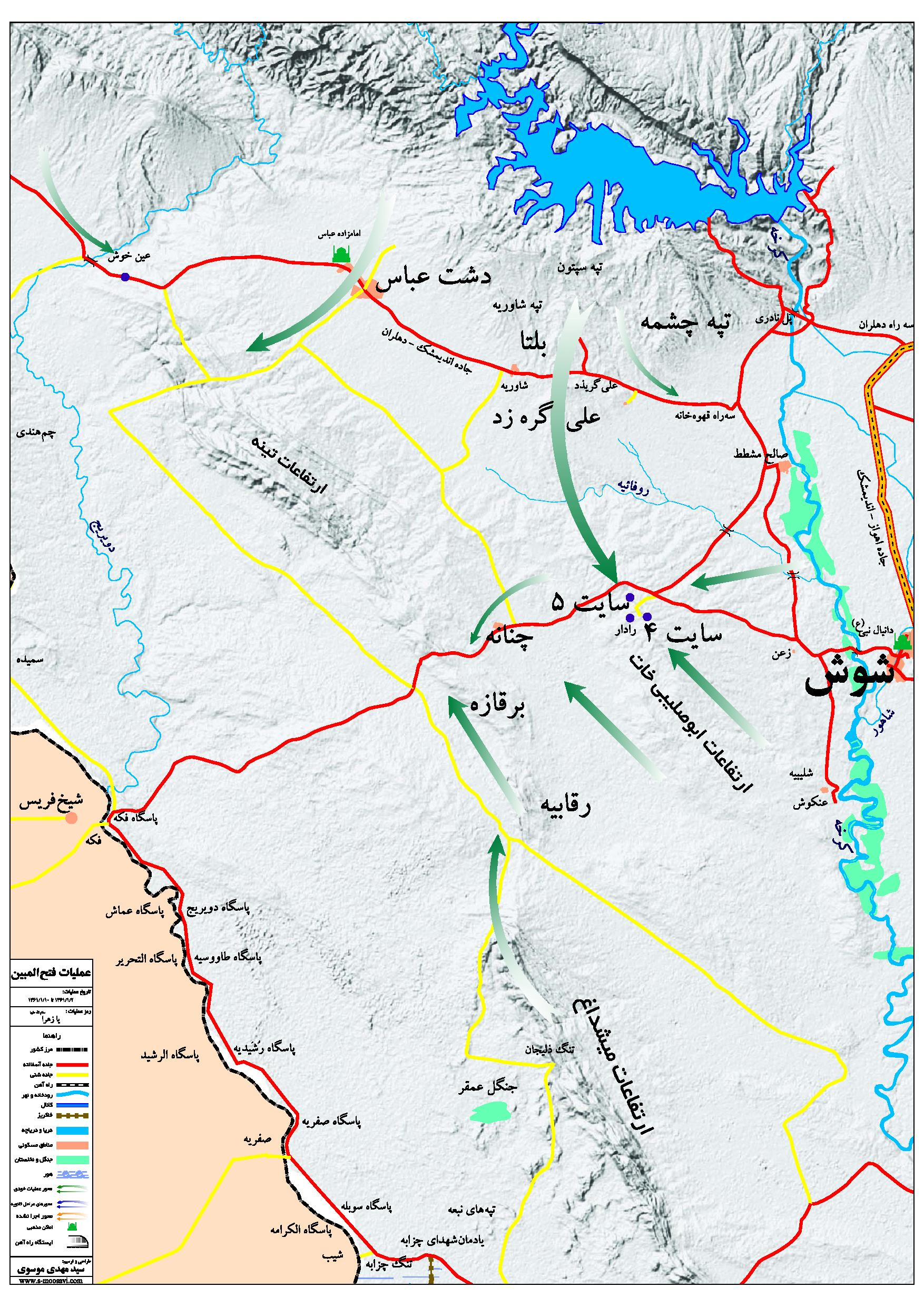
- Operation Fath ol-Mobin, Map
Date	22–28 March 1982 (6 days)
Location	Shush, Khuzestan, South-West Iran
Result	Iranian victory
Territorial changes	Iranians recapture the Dezful–Shush area: Iraqi siege on Shush is broken

Belligerents
Iraq	Iran

Commanders and leaders
(Ba'athist Iraq) Saddam Hussein	(Iran) Ali Sayad Shirazi (Iran) Hossein Kharrazi (Iran) Mohammad Boroujerdi (Iran) Massoud Monfared Niyaki (Iran) Masoud Golshani †

Strength
80,000–160,000 soldiers	80,000–100,000 regulars 40,000 Pasdaran; 30,000 Basij; 15,000 militia

Casualties and losses
8,000 killed 10,000–20,000 captured 361 tanks, IFVs & APCs, 18 aircraft, 300 vehicles, 50 artillery pieces & 30 engineering vehicles destroyed 150 tanks, 170 APCs, 500 vehicles, several SA-6 missiles, several surface-to-surface missiles, 165 artillery pieces (182 mm, 130 mm, 152 mm) & 50 engineering vehicles captured	4,000 killed 12,000 wounded 196 tanks and ≈200 APC's destroyed

Operation Fath-ol-Mobin (Persian: عملیات فتح‌المبین, a Quranic phrase meaning "Undeniable Victory" or "Manifest Victory") was a major Iranian military operation conducted during the Iran–Iraq War, in March 1982 and resulted to the Battle of Shush. The operation was led by Lt. General Ali Sayad Shirazi and was conducted in four phases.

Some believe that this operation was the turning point in the war and that it led to the eviction of Iraqi troops from Khuzestan. Others (including Efraim Karsh) believe it was actually the operation working in tandem with others which led to the expulsion of Iraqi troops from southern Iran. He believes that in fact, Operation Beit ol-Moqaddas, which lasted from April to May 1982, had the greatest effect, because the Iranians were able to liberate the strategically important city of Khorramshahr.

== Prelude ==
On 22 September 1980, Saddam Hussein, attempting to copy the success of the Israeli pre-emptive air strike against the Arab air forces in the Six-Day War, launched numerous sorties against Iranian air fields, hoping to destroy the Iranian air force on the ground. Although they failed, Saddam was still not going to be prevented from achieving his aim of establishing complete Iraqi dominance over the Shatt al-Arab, called Arvand Rood in Iran (Persian: اروند رود) waterway. He launched a land invasion of Iran, focusing on southern Iran.

He was able to achieve success, capturing the major Iranian city of Khorramshahr. Although the Iraqis were not able to capture the city of Abadan, the way was open to Tehran as the Iranian defenses had collapsed.

== The battle ==
On 22 March 1982, precisely 18 months to the day of the Iraqi invasion, the Iranians launched Operation Fath ol-Mobin. They intended to use a pincer movement to encircle Iraqi forces who had halted outside the Iranian town of Shush. Under the command of the young Iranian Chief-of-Staff, Lieutenant General Ali Sayad Shirazi, the Iranians launched an armored thrust on the night of the 22nd followed by constant human-wave attacks by Pasdaran and Basij brigades, each composed of about 1,000 fighters.

The Iranian forces still had to contend with an Iraqi army which was entrenched on the front-line and they enjoyed a good amount of tank, artillery, and aerial support. The Iranians kept up the momentum against the Iraqi forces and, after heavy Iraqi losses, Saddam ordered a retreat on the 28th.

== Aftermath ==
Along with Operation Tariq al-Qods and Operation Beit ol-Moqaddas, the Iranians were able to evict the Iraqi forces from southern Iran. The wider operation to re-capture Khuzestan is rightly to be considered a turning point. The Iranians had succeeded in achieving their standing aim of reversing the gains made by the Iraqi armed forces in the initial stages of the Iran-Iraq War. Afterward, the Iranian hardliners, headed by the Speaker of the Iranian Parliament Akbar Hashemi-Rafsanjani, argued for the expansion of Iranian war operations into Iraq. They eventually succeeded in getting their way, and the Iranians commenced several operations to conquer territory.

But where the Iranians successfully used combined-arms operations to emerge victorious against the Iraqi troops in Iran, they relied upon unsupported human wave attacks by the poorly trained and lightly equipped troops of the Pasdaran and the Basij with an insufficient logistics capability.

The Iraqis eventually stabilized their armed forces after their retreat from Iran. The result was that the Iranians would not be able to press their determined, but futile, assaults against a resurgent Iraqi army. Iraq was supported by both the United States and the Soviet Union who saw Saddam's regime as a much better option than Khomeini's regime.

== Units ==
=== Iran ===
Karbala Central Command
Commanded by Lt. Gen. Ali Sayyad Shirazi

- Qods Command
  - Army:
    - 84th Infantry Brigade of Khorramabad
      - 3 battalions
    - 92nd Armored Division of Khuzestan
      - 2nd Brigade
        - 3 battalions
  - IRGC:
    - 41st Tharallah Brigade
      Commanded by Qasem Soleimani
      - 6 battalions
    - 3rd Imam Hossein Brigade
      Commanded by Hossein Kharrazi
      - 9 battalions
    - Ilam corps
      - Several units
- Nasr Command
  Commanded by Sardar Hassan Baqeri and Amir Hossein Hassani Saadi
  - Army:
    - 21st Hamzeh Infantry Division of Azarbaijan
      (10 battalions overall)
      - 1st Brigade
      - 2nd Brigade
      - 3rd Brigade
    - 58th Zolfaqar Takavar Brigade
      - 4 battalions
  - IRGC:
    - 7th Vali-e-Asr Brigade
      - 9 battalions
    - 27th Mohammad Rasulollah Brigade
      Commanded by Ahmad Motevaselian
      - Habib ibn Madhahir Battalion
        Commanded by Mohsen Vezvaei
      - 8 other battalions
- Fajr Command
  - Army:
    - 77th Infantry Division of Khorasan
      - 3 brigades
  - IRGC:
    - 33rd Al-Mahdi Brigade
      - 6 battalions
    - 46th Fajr Brigade
      - 5 battalions
    - 17th Ali ibn Abi Taleb Brigade
      - 6 battalions
    - 35th Imam Sajjad Brigade
      - 11 battalions
- Fath Command
  - Army:
    - 92nd Armored Division of Khuzestan
      - 1st Brigade
    - 37th Armored Brigade of Shiraz
    - 55th Airborne Brigade of Shiraz
  - IRGC:
    - 8th Najaf Ashraf Brigade
      - 8 battalions
    - 25th Karbala Brigade
- Unnamed artillery units
- Unnamed combat engineer and Construction Jihad engineer units
- Islamic Republic of Iran Air Force
- Islamic Republic of Iran Army Aviation

=== Iraq ===
- 1st Mechanized Division
  - 34th Armored Brigade
  - 51st Armored Brigade
  - 1st Mechanized Brigade
  - 27th Mechanized Brigade
  - 93rd Infantry Brigade
  - 96th Infantry Brigade
  - 109th Infantry Brigade
  - 426th Infantry Brigade
  - 4 artillery battalions
- 3rd Armored Division
  - 6th Armored Brigade
  - 12th Armored Brigade
  - 8th Mechanized Brigade
  - 3 artillery battalions
- 6th Armored Division
  - 25th Mechanized Brigade
- 7th Infantry Division
  - 19th Infantry Brigade
  - 38th Infantry Brigade
- 9th Armored Division
  - 14th Mechanized Brigade
  - 35th Armored Brigade
  - 43rd Armored Brigade
- 10th Armored Division
  - 17th Armored Brigade
  - 42nd Armored Brigade
  - 51st Armored Brigade
  - 60th Armored Brigade
  - 24th Mechanized Brigade
  - 55th Infantry Brigade
  - 99th Infantry Brigade
  - 423rd Infantry Brigade
  - 505th Infantry Brigade
  - 4 artillery battalions
- 12th Armored Division
- 10th, 11th, 12th, 13th, 14th, 15th, 19th, 603rd, 604th, 605th Brigades
- Republican Guard
  - 10th Armored Brigade (backup)
- 91st Infantry Brigade
- 92nd Infantry Brigade
- 5th Border Guard Brigade
- 9 commando battalions
- Popular Army
- 217th Artillery Battalion
- Iraqi Air Force
- Iraqi Army Air Corps

== Bibliography ==
- The Iran–Iraq War, 1980–1988; Karsh, Efraim; Osprey Publishing; 2002
- Iran at War: 1500–1988; Farrokh, Kaveh; General Military; 2011, p. 363
