= Operation Commander-in-Chief =

1981 Iran–Iraq War operation

- Part of Iran–Iraq War
| Date | 11–15 June 1981 (4 days) |
| Location | Abadan, Darkhoveyn |
| Result | Iranian victory |

Belligerents
| Iraq | Iran |

Commanders and leaders
| (Ba'athist Iraq) Saddam Hussein | (Iran) Ruhollah Khomeini |

Units involved
| | Islamic Revolutionary Guard Corps |

Casualties and losses
| 1,496 killed | 120 killed |

Operation Commander-in-Chief (Persian: عملیات فرمانده کل قوا), (complete name: "Commander-in-Chief, Khomeini Ruhe-Khoda"), is the name of a military operation which was launched during Iran–Iraq War on 11 June 1981 by the Islamic Revolutionary Guard Corps against Iraqi Ba'athist army. The operation was carried out with the purpose of opening the siege of Abadan and also as a test for the significant operation of Samen-ol-A'emeh.

At this operation which was with an advance of 3 kilometers in the favor of Iranian forces, the powerful and significant positions of the Iraqi Ba'athist army in the area were (re)captured by IRGC and at-least 32 tanks and personnel carriers were annihilated and 1496 Iraqi forces were killed, wounded and captured; on the other hand 120 forces from IRGC were killed.

== See also ==
- Operation Samen-ol-A'emeh
- 14th Imam Hossein Division
