= Ahmad Kazemi =

Iranian army officer (1958–2006)

Sardar Ahmad Kazemi
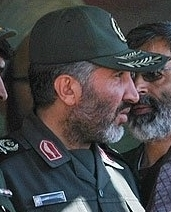
- Born: 22 July 1958; Najafabad, Isfahan, Pahlavi Iran
- Died: 9 January 2006 (aged 47); Urmia, West Azerbaijan, Iran
- Military career
- Allegiance: Iran
- Branch: IRGC
- Service years: 1981–2006
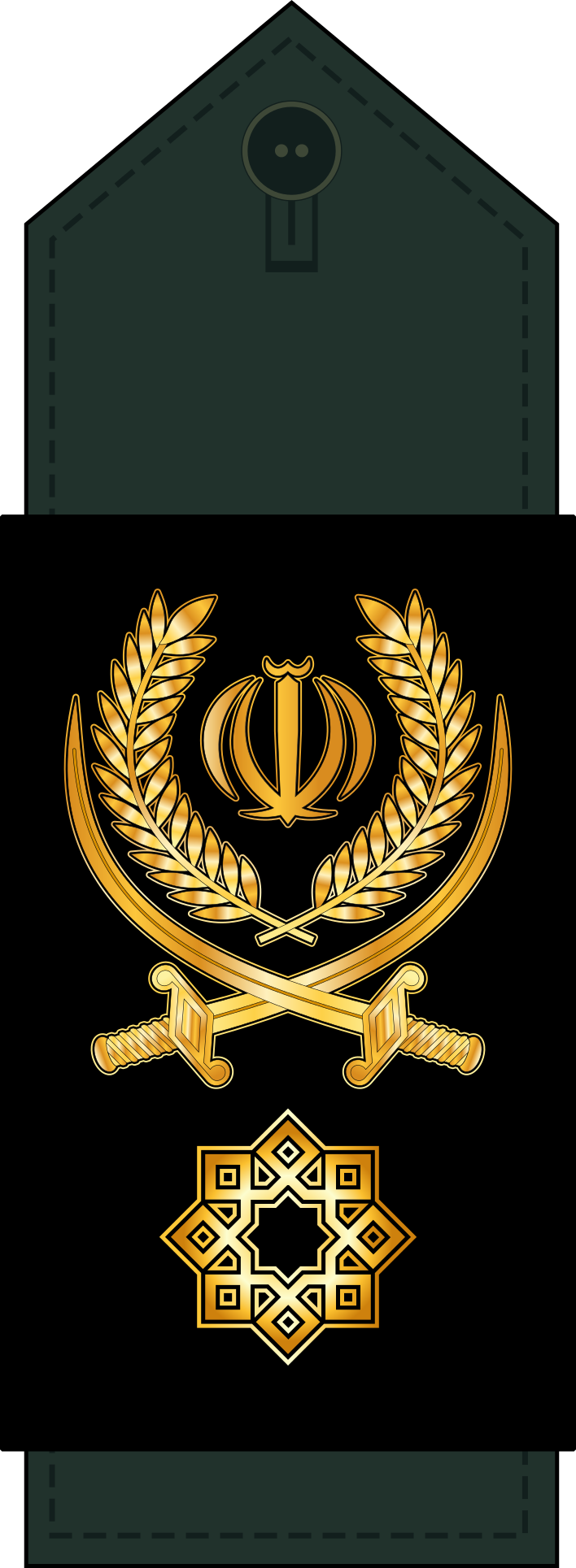
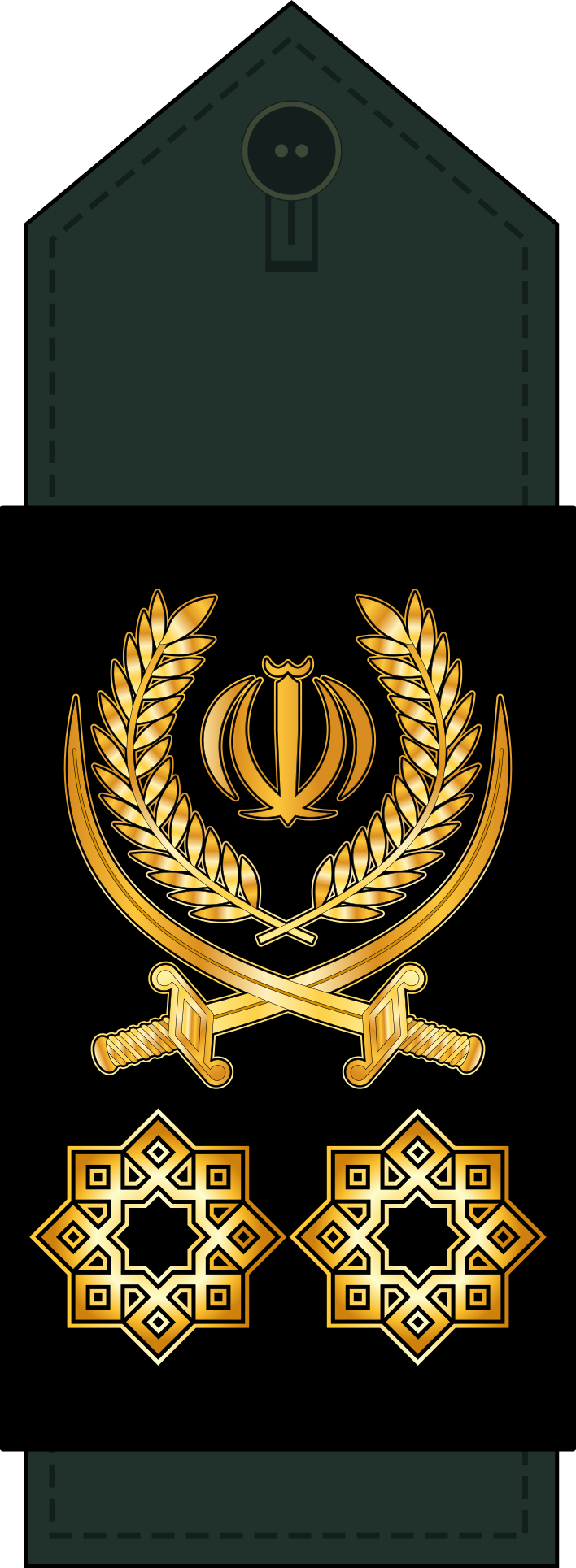
- Rank: Brigadier General; Major General (posthumously)
- Commands: Ground Force (2005–2006); Air Force (2000–2005); 14th Imam Hossein Division (1997–2000); Hamzah Sayyid al-Shuhada Headquarters (1992–1997); Deputy for Operations of the IRGC Ground Forces (1989); Ramadan Headquarters (1989–1988); 8th Najaf Ashraf Division (1981–1988)
- Conflicts: 1979 Kurdish rebellion Iran–Iraq War (WIA); Insurgency in Sistan and Balochistan
- Awards: 3rd grade Order of Fath (3)

Ahmad Kazemi (Persian: احمد کاظمی) (22 July 1958 – 9 January 2006) was an Iranian army brigadier general and one of the most notable soldiers in the Iran–Iraq War.

== Early life ==
He was born on 22 July 1958 in Najafabad, Isfahan. His father, Eshghali (عشقعلی), was a commander in the Imperial Iranian Army but withdrew in 1974 before the beginning of the Iranian Revolution. They moved to Lebanon in 1975. Ahmad with his father joined the fighters in Southern Lebanon. With the emergence of the Iranian revolution, he struggled against monarchy. After the victory of the Revolution and establishment of IRGC (Sepah) in 1980, he joined the Sepah and went to Kurdistan in 1981 to fight in the 1979 Kurdish rebellion in Iran.

== Military career ==
As Iran–Iraq War began, he joined the war with a 50-member group in Abadan fronts and began fighting with Iraq. At the end of the war, the 50-member group became a powerful and important division of Sepah. Direct presence at the front line lead to injuries of his leg, hands and back. One of his fingers was cut. After the end of the war, he attended the university and got a BA degree in geography and a master's degree in management and defense spending. He made his doctoral studies in the field of national defense. He was appointed as Commander of Ground Forces of the Islamic Revolutionary Guard Corps on 1 June 2005 by the Supreme Leader Ali Khamenei. During his service in the IRGC, he received three Fath Medals, and his last military rank until 2005 was Brigadier General. He was one of the military advisors to Presidents Akbar Hashemi Rafsanjani and Mahmoud Ahmadinejad.

He was a close friend of Mehdi Bakeri and Hossein Kharrazi as well as Quds Force commander Qasem Soleimani.

== IRGC Air Force Commander ==
Ahmad Kazemi was appointed as the commander of 14th Imam Hossein Division on 18 December 1997, and was subsequently appointed to the Air Forces of the Army of the Guardians of the Islamic Revolution (IRGC AF) Commander on 29 June 2000.

During his tenure in the IRGC Air Force, Kazemi took effective measures to improve the quality of the air force in terms of organization and structure, and for the first time equipped the IRGC AF with close air support Sukhoi Su-25 aircraft, and equipped the IRGC AF helicopter organization with purchased Mil Mi-17 helicopters. He was also in contact with the IRGC's missile unit and assisted Hassan Tehrani Moghaddam in developing ballistic missile projects.

When the Bam earthquake happened in year 2003, Kazemi mobilized the IRGC AF fleet to rescue the Bam earthquake victims by preparing the Bam Airport. Such a way that, a plane and a helicopter flew in every 13 minutes and a total of 30 thousand wounded were moved by the IRGC AF fleet.

== Personal life ==
He was married in 1978. He had two sons, Mohammad Mehdi (born 1980) and Saeed (born 1989). His eldest son, Mohammad Mehdi is now a civil engineer.

== Death ==
He was killed when the Dassault Falcon 20 plane that was carrying him, alongside 10 other occupants, crashed near Urmia. According to the Aviation Safety Network, the plane "crash-landed in a field in poor weather conditions... Reports indicate that the crew did not get three greens after selecting the gear down while on approach to Orumiyeh Airport. A flypast was done so the control tower could observe the status of the landing gear. While circling the airplane suffered a double engine flame-out, reportedly as a result of engine icing. An emergency landing was attempted in a field, but the Falcon crashed". Reports that the plane crashed due to sabotage or a bomb are still unproven. His funeral was held in Tehran and Iranian Leader Ali Khamenei attended as well.

In a letter, Iran's Leader Ali Khamenei wrote that,

Two weeks ago Martyr Kazemi came to see me. He told me, "I would like to ask you to do me two favors. First, pray to Almighty Allah that I will end up as an honorable person. Second, pray that I will attain martyrdom."

I told him, "It will really be a pity if you and others like you die an ordinary death. You and others who have passed through all those crucial stages should not die. You should all end up as martyrs. However, it is not yet time for this, since our country and our Islamic system still need you."

I further said, "The day when I was informed about the martyrdom of General Sayyad-Shirazi, I said that he was worthy of martyrdom, that he deserved to be martyred. It would have been a pity if he had died an ordinary death."

When I said this, the eyes of Martyr Kazemi became filled with tears, and he told me, "God willing, you will receive the news of my martyrdom too!"

== See also ==
- Mehdi Zeinoddin
- Ali Hashemi
- Mohammad Ebrahim Hemmat

Military offices
Preceded by Mohammad Bagher Ghalibaf	Commander of the Revolutionary Guards Air Force; 28 June 2000 – 25 August 2005	Succeeded by Mohammad Reza Zahedi
Preceded by Mohammad Ali Jafari	Commander of the Revolutionary Guards Ground Forces; 20 August 2005 – 9 January 2006	Succeeded by Mohammad Reza Zahedi
