= Mehdi Bakeri =

Iranian military commander

Sardar Mehdi Bakeri
- مهدی باکری
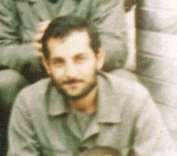
- Mehdi Bakeri (cropped), IRGC commanders, Nowruz 1983.
- Born: 9 April 1954; Miandoab, Imperial State of Iran
- Died: 16 March 1985 (aged 31); Al-Qurnah, Ba'athist Iraq
- Education: University of Tabriz
- Military career
- Allegiance: Iran
- Branch: Islamic Revolutionary Guard Corps; Imperial Iranian Army
- Service years: 1977–1985
- Rank: 2nd Lieutenant (1977–1979)
- Commands: 31st Ashura Division
- Conflicts: Iran–Iraq War; Operation Fath ol-Mobin (WIA); Operation Beit ol-Moqaddas (WIA); Operation Ramadan (WIA); Operation Muslim ibn Aqil; Operation Dawn; Operation Dawn 2; Operation Dawn 3; Operation Dawn 4; Operation Kheibar; Operation Badr (MIA)
- Awards: Order of Fath (2nd Class)

Mayor of Urmia
- In office 28 November 1979 – 24 September 1980
- Appointed by: Akbar Hashemi Rafsanjani

Mehdi Bakeri (Persian: مهدی باکری; 1954 – 16 March 1985) was an Iranian military officer who was a prominent figure in the Iran–Iraq War. He graduated in Mechanical Engineering from the University of Tabriz and participated in the Iranian Revolution against the Shah. Following the outbreak of the Iran-Iraq War, he joined to the IRGC and was killed in action in Operation Badr during the war.

== Early life ==
Bakeri was born in Miandoab, West Azerbaijan Province in a religious Iranian Azerbaijani family. He lost his mother when he was a child. His brother actively participated in opposition groups that opposed the Shah's regime and finally was killed by the regime. Bakeri might have entered these groups through his brother. After graduating from high school he was accepted by the University of Tabriz in Mechanical Engineering. When he entered the university, he continued his activities against the regime. Bakeri and his friends played an important role in holding protests against regime in Tabriz. According to classified documents, he was under surveillance of West Azerbaijan's SAVAK. During his military service, following Ayatollah Khomeini's declaration, while he was an officer on duty in Tehran, he escaped from the barracks and carrying out various activities for the victory of the Islamic Revolution.

== Career ==
After the victory of the Islamic Revolution and formation of the Islamic Revolutionary Guard Corps, he joined this institution. Bakeri served as mayor for nine months and later as the public prosecutor of Urmia, West Azerbaijan.

His wedding party was the same day as the start of Iran–Iraq War. He left his family to join the Iranian forces in the battlefront just two days later. He was appointed as the commander of the 31st Ashura Division, and showed great courage and bravery in combat against the Iraqi forces.

== Operations ==
Bakeri participated in several operations:

- Operation Beit ol-Moqaddas
- Operation Dawn (1983)
- Operation Dawn 2
- Operation Dawn 3
- Operation Dawn 4
- Operation Fath ol-Mobin
- Operation Kheibar
- Operation Ramadan

== Martyrdom ==
In Operation Badr (1985), as was the case throughout the war, he was in the most dangerous region of the battlefront. He was martyred by Iraqi troops north of the Iraqi city of Al-Qurnah. The boat which was carrying his body, sunk in the river of Tigris after being hit by an Iraqi RPG. His body was never found.

== Memorial ==
He is highly revered as one of the greatest Iranian war heroes. Bakeri Expressway, in western Tehran, has been named after him. Tractor Stadium, in Tabriz, has also been renamed after him as "Tractor's Shahid Bakeri Stadium".

== In popular culture ==
=== The Situation of Mehdi ===
The Situation of Mehdi is a 2022 film about Mehdi Bakeri, directed by Hadi Hejazifar and written by Hejazifar & Ebrahim Amini. The film won the Crystal Simorgh for Best Film, Best First Film, Best Original Score, Best Sound Recording and Best Special Effects at the 40th Fajr Film Festival. It scored the most nominations—14—and has received 5 awards (the most wins).

== See also ==
- Ahmad Kazemi
- Mohammad Ebrahim Hemmat
- Ali Hashemi (Commander)
