= 41st Tharallah Division =

Tharallah Division
- لشکر 41 ثارالله
- Active: 1980–2008
- Country: Islamic Republic of Iran
- Branch: Islamic Revolutionary Guard Corps
- Type: Infantry
- Size: Division
- Nickname: "Tharallah" (ثارالله)
- Engagements: Iran–Iraq War: First Battle of al-Faw

Commanders
- Commander: Mohammad-Mahdi Fadakar
- Notable commanders: Qasem Soleimani

The 41st Tharallah Division (also spelled Sarallah) (Persian: لشکر 41 ثارالله) was a division of the Islamic Revolutionary Guard Corps from 1980 until it was merged into the Sarallah Corps of Kerman Province in 2008.

== Formation ==
In 1980, a battalion was established consisting of forces from Sistan and Baluchestan province, Hormozgan province and Kerman province to fight in the Iran–Iraq War. In 1981, it was expanded and organized as the 41st Tharallah Brigade (Persian: تیپ 41 ثارالله). It was further expanded to comprise 4 battalions by 1982, and 6 battalions later in that year. It was eventually expanded to a division on 7 February 1983, with three infantry brigades and one armored battalion. In 1984, another brigade and one independent anti-armor battalion joined the division. The Anti-Armor Independent Battalion was expanded to the Anti-Armor Brigade a year later.

== Operations ==
The unit participated in various operations during Iran–Iraq War, namely Operation Meymak (Ammar 3), Operation Nasr 4, Operation Omm-ol-Hasanayn, Operation Dawn 10, Operation Beit-ol-Moqaddas 7, Operation Bazi-Deraz 2, Operation Karbala-5, Operation Karbala-10, Operation Karbala-4, Operation Karbala-1, Operation Dawn 8, Operation Badr, Operation Kheibar, Operation Dawn 4, Operation Dawn 3, Operation Dawn 1, Operation Ramazan, Operation Beit-ol-Moqaddas, Operation Fath-ol-Mobin, Operation Tariq-ol-Qods.

Throughout the Iran-Iraq war, the commander of the unit was Qasem Soleimani.

== 2003 plane crash ==
On 22 February 2003 an IRGC aircraft crashed near Kerman, killing all 302 people on board, all of whom were personnel of the 41st Division.

== Merge ==
The division was merged with the Basij of Kerman Province to form the Sarallah Corps of Kerman Province during the rearrangement of the IRGC units in 2008. In 2009, Brig. Gen. Mohammad Hejazi was commander who oversaw the suppression of the civil unrest in the 2009 Iranian presidential election protests.

== See also ==
- 23 People
