= 9th Armoured Division (Iraq) =

- Active: c.1975–82 August 2005 – present
- Country: Iraq (2005–present)
- Branch: Iraqi Army
- Type: Armoured
- Size: ~ 50,000
- Garrison/HQ: Camp Taji, Iraq
- Equipment: T-90; M1 Abrams; M113; BMP-1; T-72; BTR-4; BM-21 Grad; EE-9 Cascavel
- Engagements: Iran–Iraq War; Siege of Abadan; Operation Jerusalem; Operation Ramadan; Iraq War; Iraqi insurgency; War in Iraq (2013-17); Battle of Mosul (2016); Battle of Kirkuk (2017)

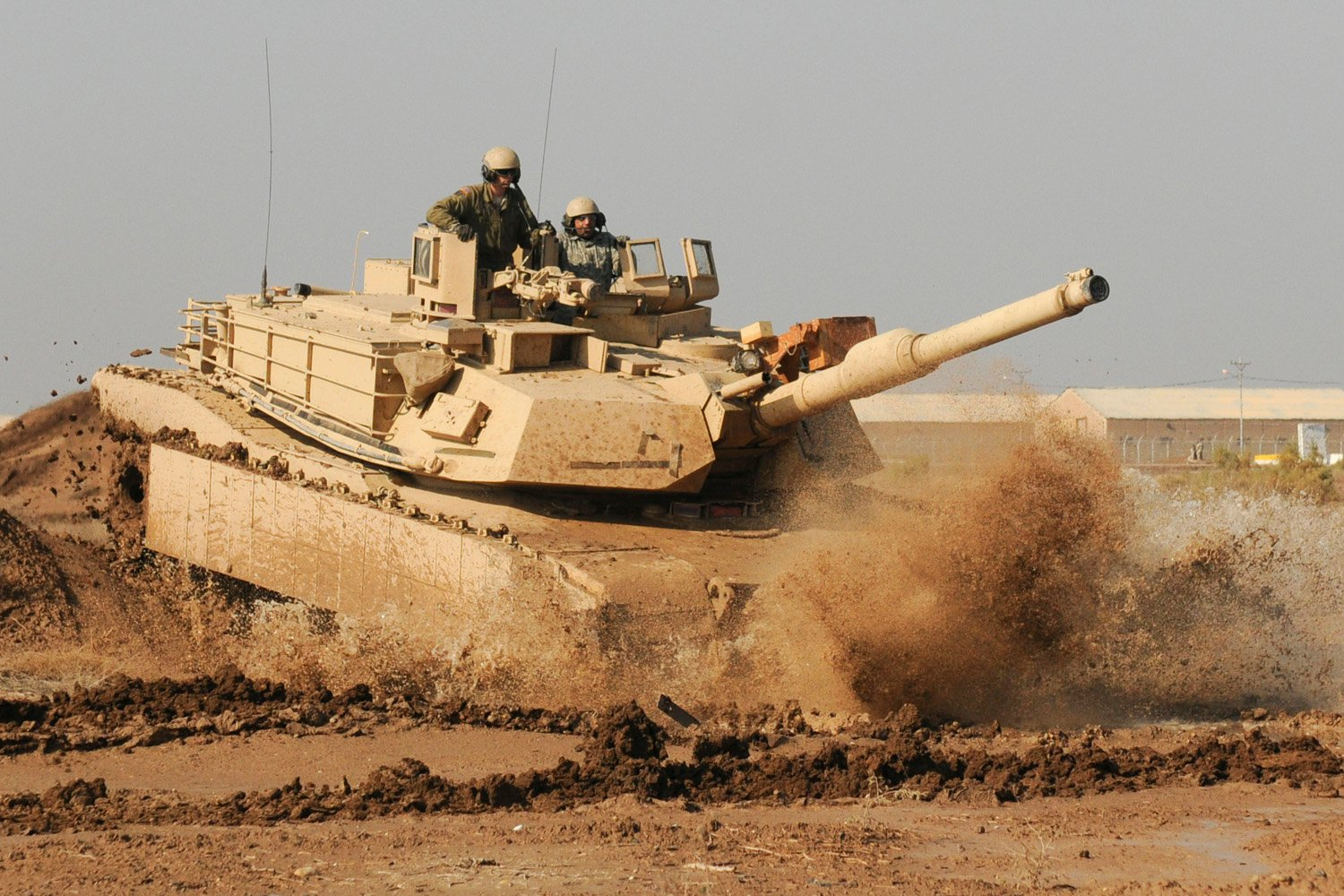
9th Division M1 Abrams in Camp Taji, Iraq.

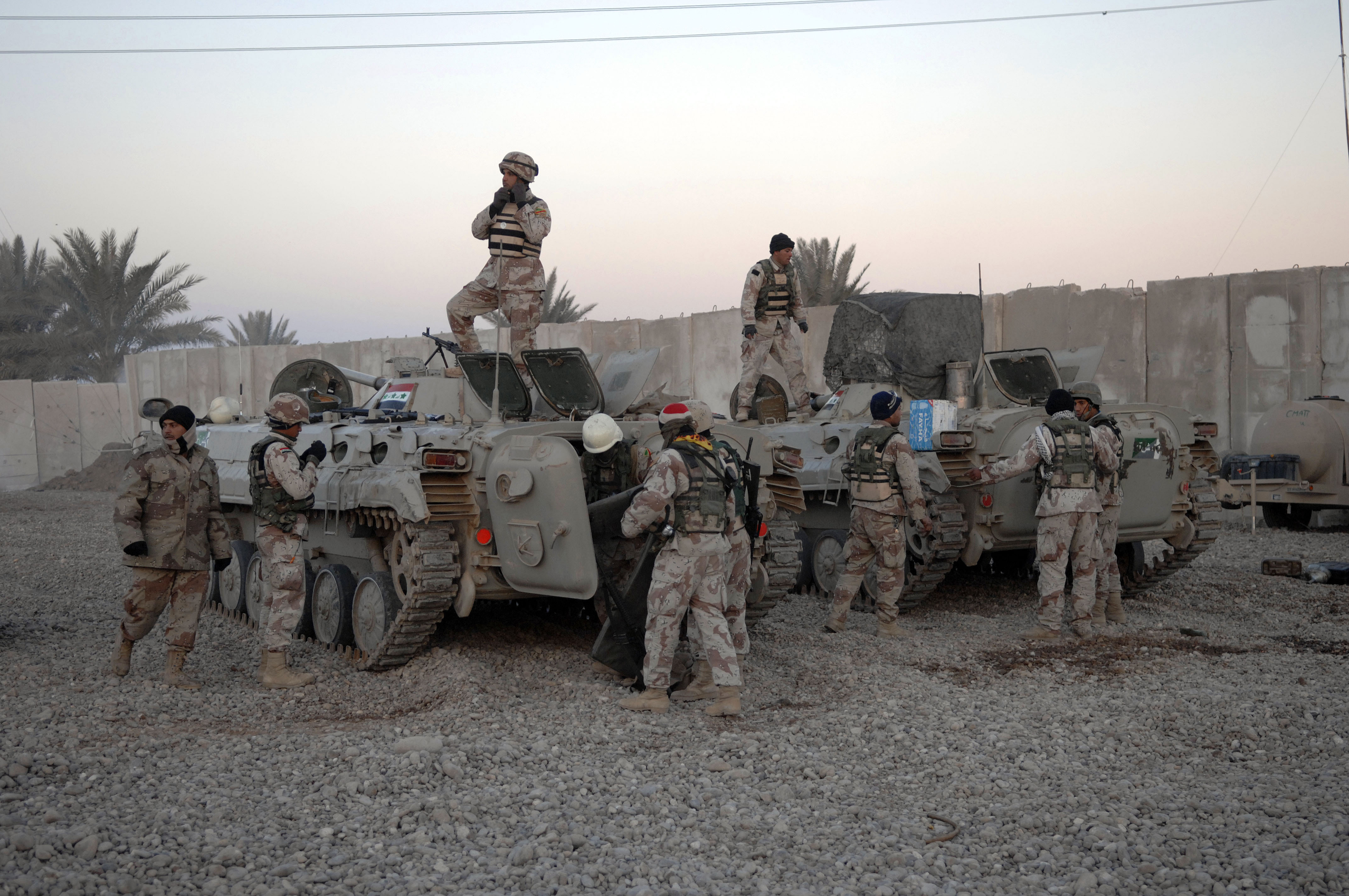
Soldiers from the 9th Division preparing for an operation in Camp Taji

The 9th Armoured Division is a formation of the Iraqi Army, originally formed probably around 1975, but disbanded in 1982. It was reformed after 2004.

== History ==
The division was formed as part of the buildup of the Iraqi Army after the Yom Kippur War. Pesach Malovany says it was 'newly established' in the leadup to the Iran–Iraq War. Before the war it was garrisoned in the An Nasiriyah area as part of the 3rd Corps. A British military attache reporting in 1977 and 1978, listed the division under the 3rd Corps, with its headquarters at Samawa, and with its brigades as the 14th Mechanised and 43rd and 45th Armoured Brigades. It first saw action in the initial Iraqi invasion of Khuzestan, and fought in several battles during the first phases of the Iran-Iraq War. However, the 9th Division was so badly beaten (and essentially wiped out) in the Operation Ramadan, in July 1982, that it was disbanded. The 9th Division was the only Iraqi division to be disbanded without being reformed during the war. Because the number nine had become unlucky in the Iraqi Army due to the division's severe losses, it was decided not to rebuild it, but instead to transfer what personnel and equipment was left to the new 17th Armoured Division (Iraq), which had just been formed within the 2nd Corps.

The division was reformed after the recreation of the Iraqi Army began after the 2003 invasion of Iraq. A 2006 article in ARMY Magazine described how the division was being built from the 'wreckage of the old Republican Guard. ..[i]ts facilities occupy the greater portion of Camp Taji, Iraq, in scores of refurbished buildings that once belonged to the Republican Guard, and much of its equipment was salvaged' from the old regime's junk. T-55 tanks and 'armoured personnel carriers for two of its three brigades were cobbled together from battle-damaged vehicles..' at Camp Taji. Contractors rebuilt functioning equipment from the scrap. Used T-72 tanks for the division's third brigade were to be purchased from a former Soviet Bloc country.

It was certified and assumed responsibility of the battle space of north Baghdad Governorate on June 26, 2006. In September 2006, ARMY Magazine said that two of the division's brigades had already been fielded and were operationally partnered with U.S. Army units. The division had carried out its first command post exercise in the northern summer of 2006.

One of the division's commanders has been General Riyadh Jalal Tawfiq, who was eventually promoted to Lieutenant General and took over the Ninevah Operational Command (NOC). The Institute for the Study of War, describing Riyadh's assumption of command of the NOC, said that the 9th Division had controlled the Rusafa area of eastern Baghdad, and that Riyadh had been credited with helping secure that 'key district.' Other divisional commander have included Major General Bashar Mahmood Ayob (2006) and, as of April 2009, Major General Qassim Jassem Nazal.

== Composition ==
The 9th Armoured Division has a territorial security mission in the region north of Baghdad, but it is also one of the principal reaction rapid formations of the Iraqi Army. After the renumbering of brigades of the army, its subordinate formations included:

- Division Headquarters – Taji
- 34th Armored Brigade (Desert Lions) [M1A1/M113]
- 35th Mechanized Brigade [T-90S.]
- 36th Armored Brigade [M1A1/M113]
- 37th Mechanized Brigade [T72/BTR80/EE9 – converting to M113s, BTR80/EE9s expected to transfer to ISOF. T-72 Tank Rgt has trained on M1A1s indicating a planned future upgrade.]

The artillery is a mix of M198, M109, and BM21s in the 9th Armoured Division. As the 9th Armoured Division upgrades, its older armor [T55/T72/BMP1/MTLBs] has been redistributed to other Iraqi Divisions:

- 3 bns of BMP1s to 6th [2 Bns] and 8th Divisions
- 2 Rgts of T55s to 3rd and 14th Divisions
- 3 Rgts of T72s to 2nd, 10th, and 12th Divisions

Of note, 9th Division provides armor instructors to the Iraqi Armor School. The presence of BTR-4s in 9th Divisions has never been confirmed as anything except training elements. Its 4th Brigade received 35 refurbished EE-9 Cascavel armoured cars from the United States in January 2008; these are now operated by the 37th Mechanized. In the prelude to the American withdrawal from Iraq, additional purchases of LAV-25s and parts for mothballed French Panhard AML-90s were also reported – presumably to supplement the other reconnaissance vehicles already in service.

In 2018, the 35th Brigade was reequipped with T-90S tanks. The brigade's M1A1s were transferred to the 34th Brigade.

== Bibliography ==
- Kenneth Pollack, Arabs at War: Military Effectiveness, 1948–1991, 2002, Bison Books, ISBN 978-0803287839
- Pesach Malovany, "Wars of Modern Babylon: A History of the Iraqi Army from 1921 to 2003", University Press of Kentucky, June 2017, ISBN 978-0813169439.
- https://www.files.ethz.ch/isn/146268/Saddams%20Generals.pdf - see pages 30–31 on fighting in 1980–82
