= Jihad of Construction =

Iranian military engineering unit (1979–2001)

- جهاد سازندگی Jahād-e Sāzandegī
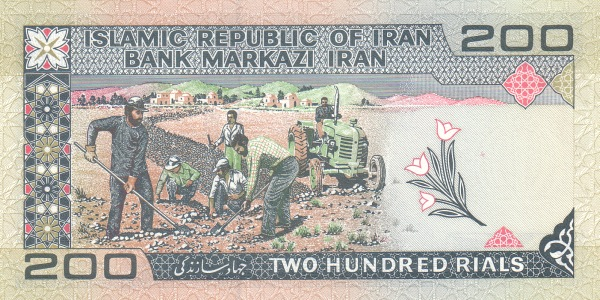
- Jihad of Construction on a 200 rial banknote of 1982.
- Active: 1979–2001
- Disbanded: 2001
- Country: Islamic Republic of Iran
- Type: Combat engineering
- Nickname(s): "Trench-less trench-makers"
- Engagements: Iran–Iraq War

Commanders
- Notable commanders: Morteza Aviny (head of Jihad TV Unit)

Jihad of Construction or Construction Jihad (Persian: جهاد سازندگی Jahād-e Sāzandegī), or simply Jihad (جهاد Jahād) was one of Organizations of the Iranian Revolution. The organization began as a movement of volunteers to help with the 1979 harvest, but soon was institutionalized and took on a broader, more developmental role in the countryside. It was involved with road building, piped water, electrification, clinics, schools, and irrigation canals. It also provides "extension services, seeds, loans," etc. to small farmers.

During the Iran–Iraq War, the organization held a combat engineering responsibility. They were active in various operation of the war, most notably in Operation Fath ol-Mobin, Operation Beit-ol-Moqaddas, Operation Kheibar, and Operation Dawn 8.

Iranian leader Ayatollah Khomeini has called them the "trench-less trench-makers" (سنگرسازان بی سنگر sangar-sāzān-e bi-sangar).

The organization engaged in development activities overseas in Tanzania (from 1987), Ghana and Lebanon (1989), Sudan and Sierra Leone (1991), and Albania (1993). It was also active in Pakistan, Afghanistan, and Bosnia and Herzegovina.

The title for a Jihad member is Jahādgar (جهادگر). The title for the commanders is Sardār-e Jahādgar (سردار جهادگر).

In 2001 it was merged with the Agriculture Ministry to form the Ministry of Agriculture Jihad.

== Imam Khomeini’s visit of the Rural District during a Jihad-e Sazandegi Project Ceremony ==
Young and revolutionary groups played a key role in the formation of the Jihad-e Sazandegi (Construction Jihad), joining together to launch grassroots activities for building infrastructure such as buildings and roads (or other foundational facilities) in rural areas of Iran. For example, after the construction of a health center (health house) in the village of Sheikh Abad near Qom (the present-day Sheikh Abad district in city of Qom), Seyyed Ruhollah Khomeini, at the invitation of the youth from Jihad-e Sazandegi, personally attended the village to inaugurate this newly established facility. This event took place after June 1979 and before the beginning of the Iraqi invasion of Iran in 1980.
