= Operation Samen-ol-A'emeh =

1981 Iran–Iraq War operation

- Part of Iran–Iraq War, Siege of Abadan
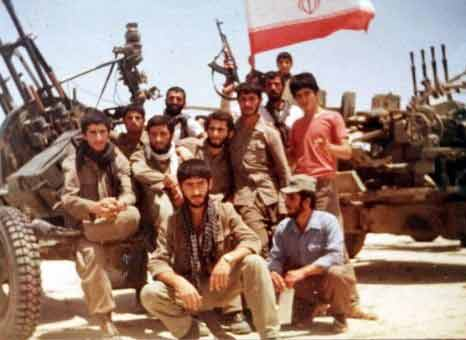
- Iranian soldiers participating the Operation Samen-ol-A'emeh
| Date | 27–29 September 1981 (2 days) |
| Location | Abadan, Khuzestan province, southwest Iran |
| Result | Iranian victory: Iraqi siege of Abadan is broken |

Belligerents
| Iraq | Iran |

Commanders and leaders
| (Ba'athist Iraq) Saddam Hussein (Ba'athist Iraq) Gen. Juwad Shitnah | (Iran) Ruhollah Khomeini |

Units involved
| | Abuzar Brigade; 77th Infantry Division of Khorasan; 36th Armoured Brigade of Shiraz; Navy's Takavar Battalion; Separate brigades from IRGC; Local volunteers IRIAA; IRIAF |

Strength
| 50,000–60,000 troops numerous armoured vehicles 200 artillery pieces | 15,000 troops (inside Abadan); 20,000–30,000 troops outside |

Casualties and losses
| 3,000 killed 1,656 captured 90 tanks/APCs destroyed 100 vehicles destroyed 3 aircraft destroyed 1 helicopter destroyed 100 tanks, 40 APCs, 3 loaders, 150 vehicles captured | 3,000 killed 150 tanks destroyed 9 AH-1J destroyed 2 CH-47 destroyed 3 Bell-214 destroyed |

Operation Samen-ol-A'emeh (Persian: عملیات ثامن‌الائمه, lit. 'Operation Eighth Imam') was an Iranian offensive and operation in the Iran–Iraq War between 27–29 September 1981 where Iran broke the Iraqi Siege of Abadan. The operation was carried out by the Iranian army joined by the Islamic Revolutionary Guard Corps.

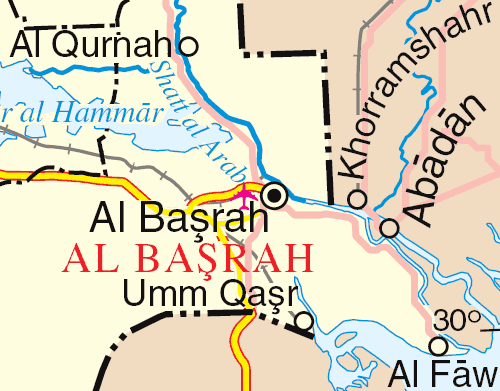
Operation map

== Diversionary attack ==
On 22 September 1981, Iran began their first successful offensive against Iraq, in order to break the Siege of Abadan. The attack began with a diversionary operation. A combined arms force of 30,000–40,000 troops attacked the Iraqi forces in a wide front around the Karkheh River in Khuzestan province, Iran, aiming for the road towards Basra, Iraq. The Iranians used their regular army supported by Revolutionary Guard infantry, the former using small groups of armored vehicles with full artillery and air support (the Iranians succeeded in establishing air superiority in spite of limited numbers of aircraft and lack of spare parts). The operation convinced Iraq that Basra was under attack, consequently, they did not reinforce their troops surrounding Abadan.

== Main attack ==
Two days later, Iran began to carry out their main offensive against Abadan. During the night, the Iranians infiltrated a force of 20,000–30,000 troops across the Bahmanshir River towards the Iraqi forces on the east bank of the Karun River around Abadan. The Iraqis failed to carry out adequate reconnaissance to discover the infiltration. The main attack was preceded by the Iranian air force carrying out airstrikes against the Iraqi troops between the Bahmanshir and the east bank of the Karun. Due to Iranian air superiority, the Iranians drove the counterattacking Iraqi jets away.

On 26 September, around midnight, the Iranian surprised the Iraqi army by attacking them from three sides. The Iraqis were pinned down in their strongest positions, while their weakest positions were torn through, resulting in the isolation of many Iraqi forces. Iraq failed to maneuver their forces against the Iranians, and they stood in their static positions. An Iranian armored battalion cut the enemy forces in two, while AH-1J SeaCobra helicopters destroyed numerous Iraqi tanks using TOW missiles. Meanwhile, the siege of Abadan was broken, yet many Iraqi forces remained on the east bank of the Karun River, prevented from retreating after the Iranian air force bombed the bridges across the Karun River.

The next phase of the battle came when the Iranians unleashed their 92nd Armored Division on the north side of the Iraqi positions on 27 September. The Iraqi command had been driven into a panic and attempted a tactical withdrawal, which turned into a rout. The Iraqis abandoned their heavy weaponry, and fled across the river on a makeshift pontoon bridge and rafts.

== Aftermath ==
The victory at Abadan was an important morale booster for Iran, and an important stepping stone for the eventual ejection of the Iraqis out of Iran. As a result of the victorious operation, the critical Ahvaz – Abadan road was reopened, allowing logistic support and reinforcement for the troops in Abadan. With a carefully planned operation and well-executed use of their available materials, the Iranians routed a theoretically superior opponent.

After the operation, a large number of tanks and heavy vehicles were left by the Iraqi army.

Saddam Hussein ordered the execution of seven commanders, including General Juwad Shitnah, after the operation.

== See also ==
- Operation Commander-in-Chief
- Siege of Abadan
