= Operation Before the Dawn =

1983 Iran–Iraq War operation

- Part of Iran–Iraq War
Date	6–11 February 1983 (5 days)
Location	Al-Fakkah Field, al-Amarah, Iraq
Result	Iraqi victory: Limited Iranian advance; Successful Iraqi defense
Territorial changes	Iran gained small portions of relatively insignificant land

Belligerents
Iraq	Iran

Commanders and leaders
(Ba'athist Iraq) Saddam Hussein (Ba'athist Iraq) Hisham Fakhri	(Iran) Hossein Kharrazi (Iran) Mohsen Rezaee

Strength
60,000 soldiers, with armour, aircraft, and artillery	200,000 soldiers 7 infantry divisions (including an airborne division); 2 armoured divisions 2 artillery battalions

Casualties and losses
2,000 killed 60 tanks lost	5,000 killed 12,000 wounded 100+ tanks lost

Operation Before the Dawn was an offensive operation launched by Iran during the Iran–Iraq War in 1983 around the Amarah area 200 kilometers southeast of Baghdad. It was carried out under the command of the Islamic Revolutionary Guard Corps along with the support of the regular army, during the operation, Iran suffered heavy casualties due to weak air support and heavy Iraqi artillery fire and aerial bombing.

== Prelude ==
The Iranians originally planned the offensive to mark the fourth anniversary of the Islamic Revolution. The main objectives were to drive enemy forces from Iranian soil, seize Iraqi territory in the Amarah area, and move on to the city. Seizure of the city of Amarah would give Iran the upper hand in disrupting troop and supply movements from Baghdad to Basra.

U.S. Intelligence reported that both sides had over 100,000 soldiers poised for battle. The Iranian forces consisted of mostly 'last reserve' Pasdaran and Basij volunteers backed by two divisions of the Islamic Republic of Iran Army. Iraqi forces consisted mostly of conscript infantry backed by Republican Guard tank brigades. In addition, the Iraqis also held three lines of trenches which formed a semicircle around Amarah.

The terrain of the battleground added to Iran's difficulty. The area around Amarah rested in an area of sand hills and marshes of which created an open plain. To this affect, Iraqi trenches were strategically positioned from the sand hills down to the tip of the marshes.

Regardless, Iranian Parliament Speaker Ali Akbar Hashemi Rafsanjani further boasted:

The people expect this offensive to be the final military operation that will determine the destiny of the region.

== The battle ==
Operation Fajr al-Nasr (Before the Dawn/Dawn of Victory), launched on 6 February 1983, and it saw the Iranian shift of focus from the southern to the central and northern sectors. Iran, using 200,000 "last reserve" Revolutionary Guard troops, attacked along a 40 kilometres (25 mi) stretch near Al Amarah, Iraq about 200 kilometres (120 mi) southeast of Baghdad. One armoured division proceeded to Sumar in the central zone as a diversion to mask seven reserve infantry divisions that went from the southern sector to the central city of Dezful. The Iraqis knew about this concentration of forces and knew that an inevitable mass human wave assault would occur in the central zone, yet did nothing to disrupt what would be Operation Before the Dawn, which began in February 1983.[64] This was Iran's long-awaited plan to take the war inside Iraq on a grand scale. The Iranians wanted to penetrate and capture the cities of al-Shabeeb and al-Amarah, and to reach the highways linking Baghdad down to Amarah and further down to Basra. In the south, a massive Iranian force of two infantry and two armoured divisions, three border guard regiments, an airborne regiment, a Basij division, and two artillery battalions attempted to isolate Basra from the rest of Iraq.[64]

Facing the Iranians was the Iraqi 4th Corps, which was made up of two infantry divisions, one mechanized division, and two armoured divisions. The al-Shabeeb assault was stalled by 60 kilometers of hilly escarpments, forests and river torrents blanketing the way to Amarah. Once the Iranians finally arrived near Amarah, Iraqi air force fighters thwarted Iranian close air support, but the Iraqi counter-attack was also hindered and the various attacks and counter-attacks regressed into entrenchment and artillery duels. The Iranians dug themselves in along the entire front lines, from north to south, and although Iraq countered the assault on al-Shabeeb, it did not result in Iraq's tactical advantage as these thousands of entrenched Iranian forces now concentrated artillery fire on Basra, Khanaqhin, and Mandali.[64]

By the middle of the offensive, Tehran Radio reported having liberated over 120 square miles (310 km^{2}) of Iranian territory (which in fact was one of several disputed territories). The reality was much more bleak, however, as Iran continually resorted to crude tactics, including the use of soldiers in human wave charges across no man's land, which was always met with withering fire from the Iraqis. Lightly equipped, inadequately supported, and poorly trained Iranians attempted to charge dug-in Iraqi infantrymen firing from trenches. In addition, Iranian teenage soldiers died by the hundreds, and some were captured after being wounded. Residents of the city of Ahvaz, 100 miles (160 km) behind the front, reported that their morgue was filled to the rim with bodies from the field.

== Personal account ==
The following is a rare excerpt of a child soldier's experience during this operation. It has been cited from Ian Brown's, Khomeini's Forgotten Sons: The Story of Iran's Boy Soldiers:

After only a month's training at a camp near Khorramshahr, I was sent to the front. When we arrived we all assembled in a field where there must have been a thousand of us, some younger than me, and old men as well. The commander told us we were going to attack an Iraqi position north-east of Basra which guarded the road to Qurna, to try to capture the road. The following morning we set off at 4:00 A.M. in army trucks, and I had been given a gun and two hand grenades. The trucks stopped at the Iranian front and they told everyone to get out. The sun was beginning to come up as we started walking towards the Iraqi lines, and boy, was I scared! We'd been told the position was three kilometers away. As we got nearer, we could hear shells exploding, and I think it was us shelling them. When we got to the top of a hill, we started running down the other side towards the enemy position. I wasn't afraid any more. We all shouted, "Allah akbar" (God is great) as we ran, and I could see soldiers in front of us - a line of helmets - then they started firing. People dropped all around me, but I kept running and shouting while many were being killed. By the time I reached the trenches, I'd thrown my grenades and somehow had lost my gun, but I don't remember how. Then I was hit in the leg and fell over and lay for a long time right in front of the front lines. Other Iranians passed me but they all fell. I wanted to get up and help them but couldn't move. My leg felt like it was burning. Finally, the attack stopped in the afternoon, but I was asleep when the Iraqis came out of the trenches to look at the bodies. They were kicking them and when they kicked me, I screamed out in pain. But they picked me up and tossed me into the back of a lorry. For me the war was over.

== Aftermath ==
Iran managed to regain 100 square miles (260 km^{2}) of its own territory (part of the disputed territory). But after a week of stalemate, Iran abandoned the operation after making minimal gains against the Iraqis. Rafsanjani later retracted his earlier boast, saying that the offensive was not the last as expected. As for the Iraqis, this victory helped the poorly motivated and shaken ground forces to boost their morale.

The Iranians suffered tremendous casualties clearing minefields and breaching Iraqi anti-tank mines surrounding Basra, which Iraqi engineers were unable to replace. Iraq deployed its navy as a diversion and destroyed Iranian patrol craft in the Iranian port of Khor-Musa. The Iraqi Air Force was also effectively deployed, with fixed wing fighters massing fires on Iranian formations in the southern sector. After this battle, the vicious cycle of Iranian human wave assaults continued but not to the level of Operation Before the Dawn, or of the previous massive Iranian assaults of 1982.[64]

In addition during April 1983, the Mandali-Baghdad northcentral sector witnessed fierce fighting, as Iranian attacks were stopped by Iraqi mechanised and infantry divisions. Casualties were high, and by the end of 1983, an estimated 120,000 Iranians and 60,000 Iraqis had been killed during the whole war. Despite these losses, in 1983 Iran held the advantage in the war of attrition.[6]:2 By this time, it was estimated that no more than 70 Iranian fighter aircraft were still operational at any given time, for that reason helicopters were more often used for close air support, because Iran had their own facilities from before the revolution to repair them[58] [64]

== Bibliography ==
1. The Last Blow, TIME Magazine, Feb. 21, 1983.
2. Khomeini's Forgotten Sons: The Story of Iran's Boy Soldiers, Grey Seal Books, 1990.
3. The Longest War, by Dilip Hiro, Routledge, Chapman, and Hall, Inc. 1991.
4. http://smallwarsjournal.com/jrnl/art/the-%E2%80%9Cdawn-of-victory%E2%80%9D-campaigns-to-the-%E2%80%9Cfinal-push%E2%80%9D-part-three-of-three
