= 7th Division (Iraq) =

7th Iraqi Army Division
- Active: c.1960s–2003 2004–present
- Country: Iraq
- Branch: Army
- Type: Division
- Role: Infantry
- Size: ~ 40,000
- Part of: Iraqi Ground Forces Command
- Garrison/HQ: Ramadi (pre 2014); Al Asad Airbase (c.2015)
- Engagements: Iran–Iraq War: Operation Tariq al-Quds; Operation Jerusalem; Second Battle of Al Faw; Gulf War: Battle of Kuwait International Airport; Iraq War: Battle of Ramadi; Battle of Basra; Iraqi insurgency

Commanders
- Current commander: Maj. Gen. Murthi Mishin Rafa Farahan

Insignia
- Division Flag

The 7th Division is a division of the Iraqi Army.

First formed in the 1960s or 1970s, it was reported in 1977–78 to have its headquarters at Sulaimaniyah with five brigades (all active). It served in the 1991 Gulf War at the Battle of Kuwait International Airport. In 2002, it was reported to be with the 5th Corps (Iraq) and comprise the 38th, 39th, and 116th Brigades. It was disbanded in 2003.

It was reformed after 2004 and trained by the United States Marine Corps. It is now headquartered at Al Asad Airbase. It played a part in the defeat of Al-Qaeda in Iraq (AQI) in Al Anbar Governorate in 2007. In April 2007 planning was underway to form a fourth brigade for the division. The division was transferred to the Iraqi Ground Forces Command on November 1, 2007.

The division's brigades included the 26th Motorized (AAslt) Brigade; the 27th Motorized (AAslt) Brigade; the 28th Motorized Brigade, and the 29th Mechanized Brigade (operational since April 3, 2008).

In accordance with the standards of training Iraqi forces the division's brigades or battalions will be committed at all times in other units. This was tested by detaching units of the 7th Division south of Baghdad in early of 2008. The 29th is the last brigade formed in the desert of western Iraq, is based in Rutbah, it may be in line to be equipped with wheeled armour like the 37th or 17th Brigades.

In May 2008, the 26th Brigade participated in operations in Basra.

On 21 December 2013, Major General Mohammed al-Karawi, the Commander of the division, was killed during a security operation in Rutbah against al-Qaeda training camps. In the incident, several suicide bombs had gone off as Karawi was entering a deserted building, killing Karawi alongside several officers, and wounding up to 32 soldiers. More than 60 militants had been in the area at the time.

Throughout late 2014 and early 2015, some 320 US advisers trained the troops of the 7th Division, which occasionally engaged in skirmishes with militants of the Islamic State of Iraq and the Levant (ISIL).
