= 31st Ashura Division =

- لشکر 31 عاشورا
- Active: 1979–present
- Country: Islamic Republic of Iran
- Branch: Islamic Revolutionary Guard Corps
- Type: Infantry
- Size: Division
- Garrison/HQ: East Azarbaijan Province; West Azarbaijan Province; Ardabil province
- Nickname: "Ashura" (عاشورا)
- Engagements: 1979 Kurdish Rebellion; Iran–Iraq War; First Battle of al-Faw; Twelve-Day War

Commanders
- Commander in Chief: Governor-General Zeinolabedin Razavi Khorram
- Notable commanders: Mohammad Ali Jaafari; Mehdi Bakeri; Amin Shari'ati; Ali Tajalaei (deputy); Nader Ghazipour; Hamid Bakeri (deputy); Dr.Mansour Haghdoust (deputy)

31st Ashura Division (Persian: لشکر 31 عاشورا) is a division of the Islamic Revolutionary Guard Corps. It covers the provinces of East Azarbaijan, West Azarbaijan, and Ardabil.

It was first officially organized as the 1st Ashura Brigade (Persian: تیپ 1 عاشورا) under command of Mohammad Ali Jaafari during Iran–Iraq War, just before Operation Muharram. Its units had participated in various clashes after the 1979 Revolution. The brigade was later expanded into 31st Ashura Division. It participated in various operations of the Iran–Iraq War. Its notable commander was Mehdi Bakeri. After Bakeri's death in Operation Badr, Amin Shari'ati was appointed as its new commander. The division was merged with and is now a part of the Basij of East Azerbaijan province to form the East Azerbaijan Ashura Provincial Corps during the rearrangement of the IRGC units in 2008.

The 31st Ashura Division is currently headquartered in Tabriz, with IRGC Brigadier General Alireza Madani serving as its commander. Before the war, they fought in Kurdistan, helping to take control of cities like Saqqez, Oshnavieh, Bukan, Piranshahr, Sardasht, Shahin Dezh, and others.

During the war, they joined many major operations, including:

- Susangerd and Hoveyzeh battles in southern Iran
- Imam Mahdi, Tarrah Ramadan, Martyr Madani, and Samen al-A'emeh operations around Susangerd
- Imam Mahdi and Imam Ali operations in Khuzestan
- Tariq al-Quds near Bostan
- Matla al-Fajr in Sarpol-e Zahab
- Muhammad Rasulullah in Nowsud
- Mowla Muttaqian in Chazabeh
- Fath al-Mobin around Dezful, Shush, and the Karkheh River
- Beit al-Moqaddas, which liberated Khorramshahr

Other missions included:

- Operation Ramadan near Basra, Iraq
- Operation Muslim ibn Aqil in Sumar and Salman
- Several Wal-Fajr operations in Fakkeh, Chazabeh, and Marivan
- Operation Kheibar and Operation Badr near the Tigris River and Majnoon Island
- Karbala 4, 5, and 8 battles near Basra
- Ya Mahdi (Sahib al-Zaman) battle near Basra and Umm al-Qasr
- Nasr 7 near Sardasht
- Operation Beit ol-Moqaddas 2 near Sulaymaniyah, Iraq
- Battle of Mersad and mobile defenses in Kushk and Baneh
