= Siege of Abadan =

1980–1981 battle of the Iran–Iraq War

Coordinates: 30.3333°N 48.2833°E

- Part of the Iran–Iraq War
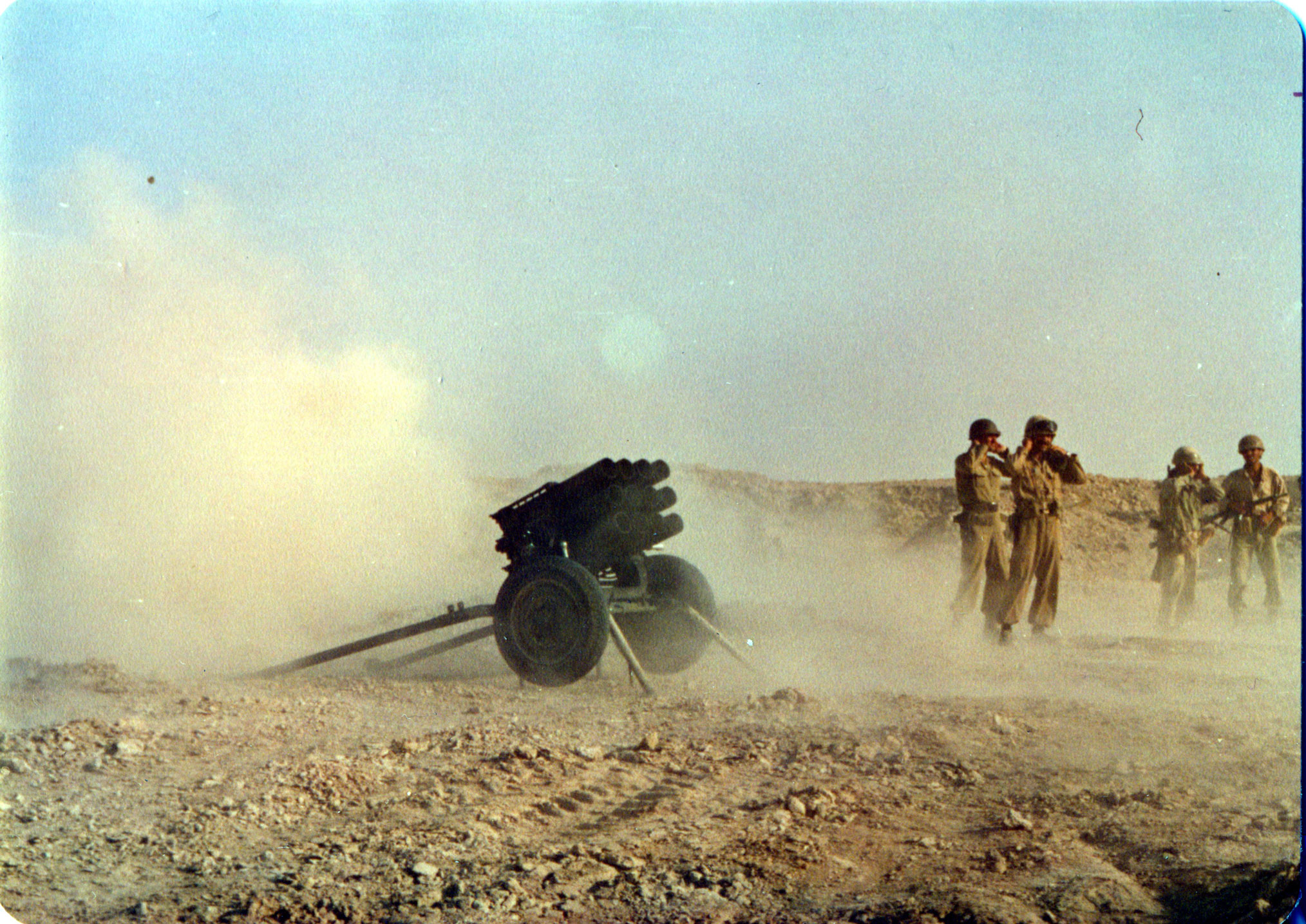
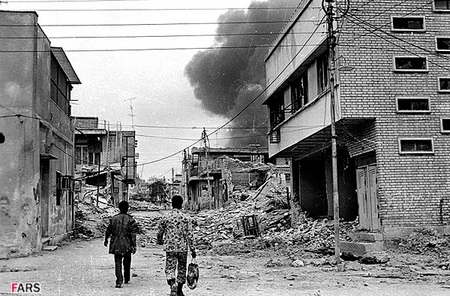
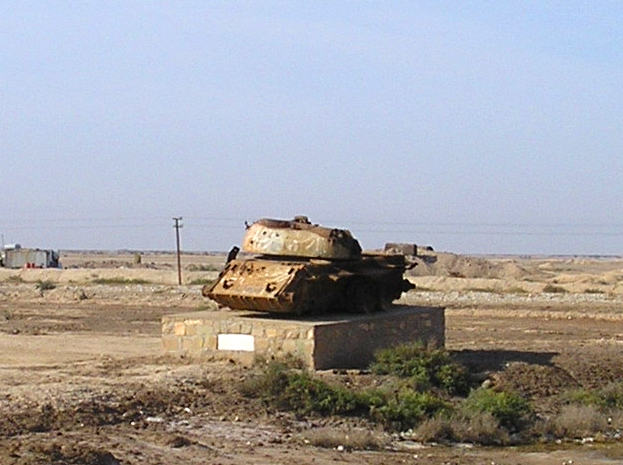
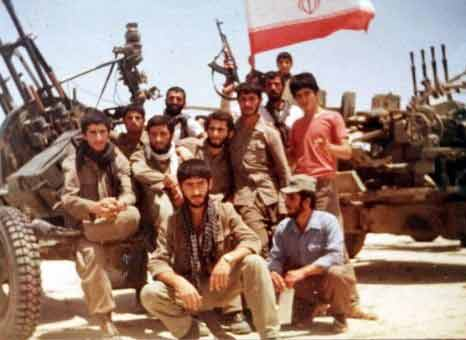
- Top-left to bottom-right: Artillery firing during Operation Samen-ol-A'emeh; Breaking the Siege of Abadan; The remains of a destroyed Iraqi T-55 tank in Abadan; Iranian soldiers during Operation Samen-ol-A'emeh
Date	6 November 1980 – 27 September 1981 (10 months and 3 weeks)
Location	Abadan, Khuzestan province, southwest Iran
Result	Iranian victory; Iraqi siege broken

Belligerents
Iraq	Iran

Commanders and leaders
Saddam Hussein; Kamel Sajid; Wafiq al-Samarrai	Ruhollah Khomeini; Mostafa Chamran; Mohammad Borujerdi

Units involved
	92nd Armored Division

Strength
4,500 men initially 60,000 men at peak 360–800 tanks	6,000–15,000 men 50–60 tanks initially

Casualties and losses
1,500 casualties Hundreds of armored vehicles destroyed	3,000 casualties 170+ tanks destroyed

The siege of Abadan was the encirclement of the city by Iraqi forces beginning in November 1980. The city had already been under almost daily bombardment since the early days of the war, which began the previous September.

Abadan Island was the site of the Abadan Refinery, one of the world's largest oil refineries.

== The plan ==
In September 1980, Iraqi President Saddam Hussein launched a surprise attack against Iran and invaded Iranian territory on a broad front. Iraq's initial plan to attack Abadan Island called for a reinforced armored division to cross the Shatt al-Arab near Kharkiya on the road heading from Baghdad to Basra and then head south to capture the cities of Khorramshahr and Abadan, and subsequently engage any remaining local Iranian units. This reinforced division to be used included 500-600 tanks, as well as some special forces units, for a total troop strength of 20,000 men.

Iraqi commandos, driven by initial success in the attack on Khorramshahr, had crossed the Karun River and reached the Abadan city limits on 22 September, but had been forced back by stiff resistance from Iranian paramilitary units, causing the Iraqis to withdraw to the western side of the Karun River, at the cost of several tanks and APCs. On 2 October, Iraqi commandos followed by tanks managed to cross the Karun river 4 kilometers upstream of the Shatt al-Arab, the first to begin the encirclement. By 4 October Iraqi commanders reported that they had secured the main road from Abadan to Ahvaz, however it was not until late November that Iraq fully controlled the bridge to Abadan.

As, the Iraqi army became preoccupied with the ongoing Battle of Khorramshahr, the original plan was heavily modified, with instead of calling for a quick engagement and occupation of Abadan, the plan now was to isolate local Iranian units within Abadan, and then lay siege to the island.

== The battle ==
On 3 November, Iraqi forces reached Abadan in Iran's Khuzestan province. Iranian resistance proved too strong, however, so Iraqi commanders called for reinforcements. A second, weakened armored division with a strength of approximately 4,500 men and 200 tanks was sent to cut off Abadan and surround the city from the northeast, bypassing Khorramshahr, which was still under siege, by crossing the Karun River to the north of the city. These two Iraqi divisions faced an unknown number of Iranian troops. Most likely sources estimate that a single brigade defended Khorramshahr supported by two operational reserves located further north.

== The siege ==
Although, the Iraqis were repulsed by the Iranian Pasdaran unit, they managed to surround Abadan on three sides and occupy a portion of the city. However, the Iraqis could not overcome the stiff resistance; sections of the city still under Iranian control were re-supplied, and received reinforcements to replace losses, at night by boat and by helicopter. The Iraqis kept up a siege for several months, but never succeeded in capturing Abadan. Much of the city, including the oil refinery, was badly damaged or destroyed by the siege and by bombing.

== Iraqi June Offensive ==
Facing declining morale and with the Shatt-al-Arab waterway still blocked by the besieged Iranians, Saddam ordered the Iraqi troops to attack in June 1981. The Iranians had reinforced the garrison with 15,000 troops, including the Pasdaran, regular army, and local Khuzestani Arab fighters. Iraq unleashed an offensive against the city, using 60,000 troops and hundreds of tanks, outnumbering the Iranians 4–1. Despite that, the Iranians defeated the Iraqi assaults. The Iranians used their Chieftain tanks to help defeat the Iraqis.

== Breaking of the Siege ==
From 22–27 September 1981, Iran carried out Operation Samen-ol-A'emeh. During this battle, Iran carried out the first major use of human wave attacks. The siege of Abadan was broken, Iran took 3,000 casualties while the Iraqis took half of that number. Iran captured 2,500 prisoners and destroyed hundreds of armored vehicles, while losing of their own 170 M-47, M-48, M-60 Patton tanks and Chieftain tanks.

== 15 October ambush ==
On 15 October, the Iraqis forced their way to within 1.6 kilometres (1 mi) of Abadan and captured the city's radio-television station. In a separate engagement farther north, near the Iraqi blocking position near Dar Khuyeh, an Iraqi armor force ambushed a large Iranian convoy, escorted by tanks coming from Ahwaz. Apparently this Iranian force was attempting to carry supplies to the besieged defenders of Abadan by way of the Abadan-Ahvaz highway. The short, but intense battle matched Iraqi T-55 and T-62 tanks against Iran's Chieftains. This skirmish, which appears to have involved about a battalion's worth of combat vehicles from each side, was an Iraqi victory as "the Iranians abandoned at least 20 Chieftains and other armored vehicles, and decamped on foot."

== Aftermath ==
Abadan was largely in ruins in the aftermath of the siege. The Iraqi threat to Abadan had been broken, and the Iranians had managed to launch their first successful counteroffensive against Iraq. Eventually, it would result in the driving out of Iraqi troops from Iran and the Liberation of Khorramshahr in 1982.
