= Mohammad Reza Zahedi =

Iranian military officer (1960–2024)

Sardar Mohammad Reza Zahedi
- محمدرضا زاهدی
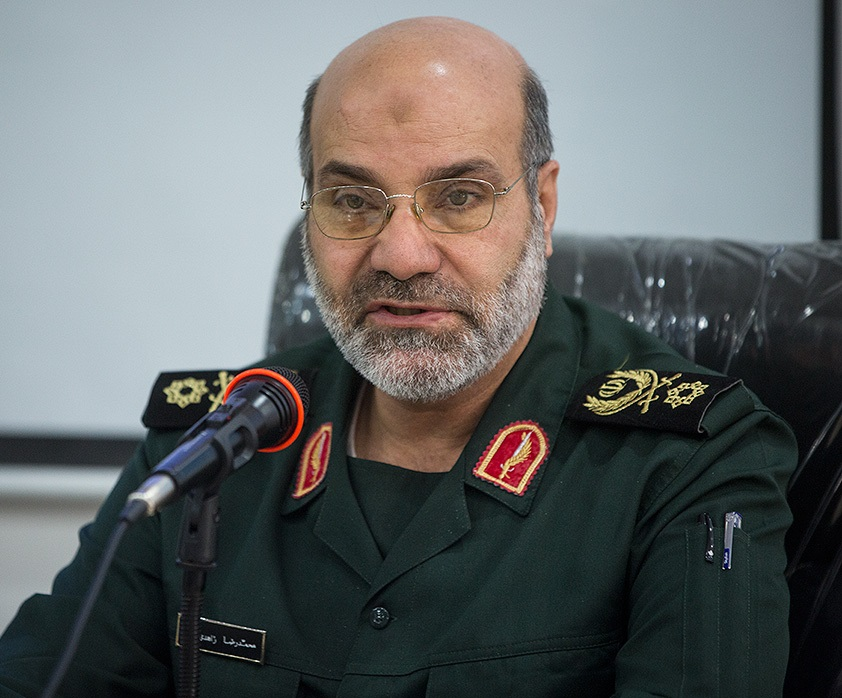
- Zahedi in 2017
- Born: 2 November 1960; Isfahan, Pahlavi Iran
- Died: 1 April 2024 (aged 63); Mezzeh, Damascus, Ba'athist Syria
- Cause of death: Assassination by airstrike
- Other names: See list: Mohammad Riza Zahdi; Reza Mahdavi; Hasan Mahdawi; Ali Reza Zahedi; Ali Zahedi
- Military career
- Allegiance: Iran
- Branch: IRGC
- Service years: 1980–2024
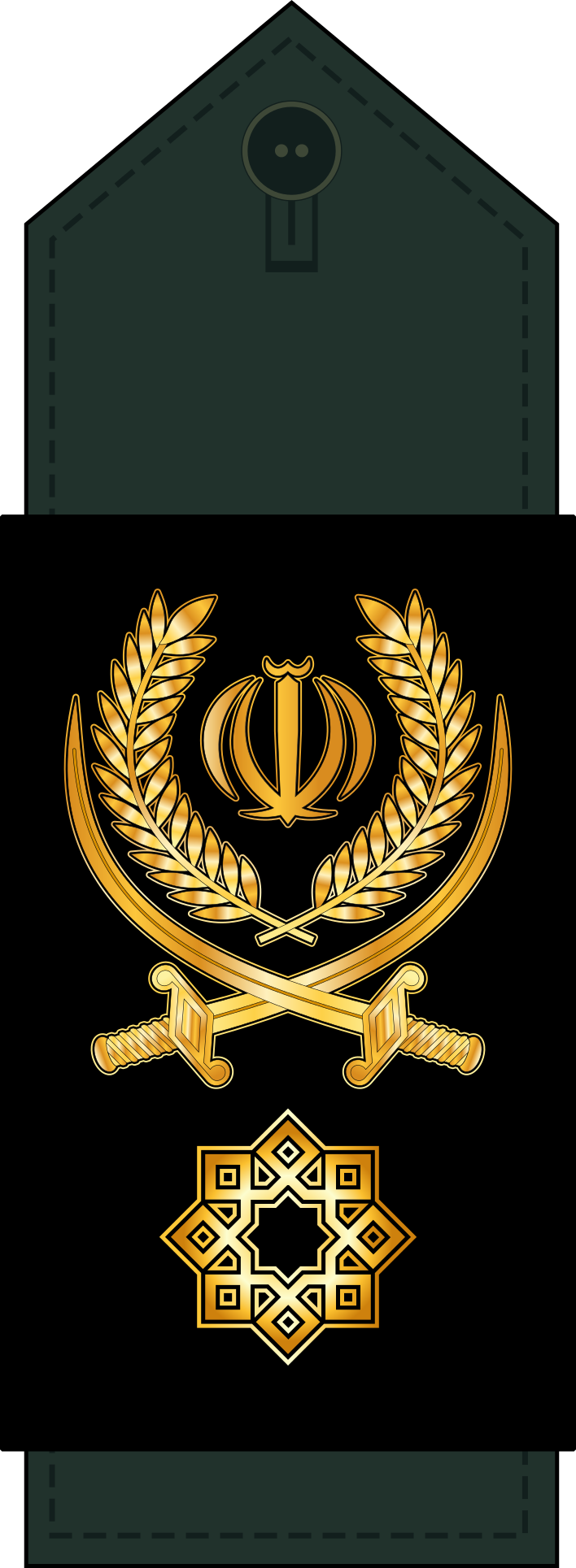
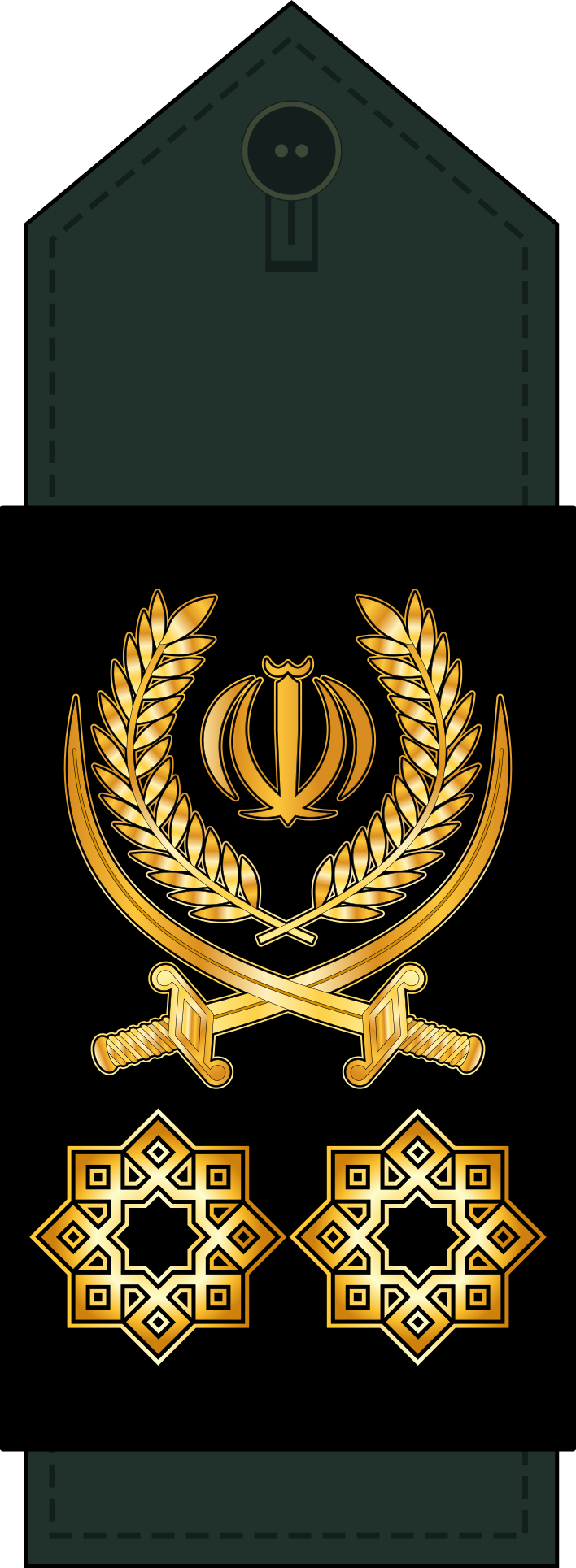
- Rank: Brigadier General; Major General (posthumously)
- Unit: Quds Force
- Commands: Unit 18000 (?–2024); Deputy of Operations for the IRGC (2016–2019); IRGC Ground Forces (2005–2008); IRGC Aerospace Force (2005); Deputy IRGC Ground Forces (2003–2005); 16th Quds Division (1992–1998); 14th Imam Hossein Division (1987–1991); 44th Qamar-e Bani Hashem Brigade (1983–1987)
- Conflicts: 1979 Kurdish rebellion; Iran–Iraq War; Syrian civil war; Iranian intervention in Syria; 2024 Iran–Israel conflict †

Mohammad Reza Zahedi (Persian: محمدرضا زاهدی; 2 November 1960 – 1 April 2024) was an Iranian military officer. A senior figure within the Islamic Revolutionary Guard Corps (IRGC), he had previously commanded the IRGC Aerospace Force and the IRGC Ground Forces, and was commanding the Quds Force Unit 18000 in Lebanon and Syria at the time of his death.

In 2024, Zahedi was killed by an Israeli airstrike on the Iranian consulate in Damascus. According to the Canadian Broadcasting Corporation, he was the only Iranian to sit on the Shura, or guiding council, of Hezbollah. According to The Guardian, he was most likely a critical figure in coordinating Iran's relationship with Hezbollah in Lebanon and the Assad government of Syria.

== Military career ==
Zahedi joined the IRGC at the age of 19 and served as a mid-level officer during the Iran–Iraq War. He led the 44th Qamar Beni Hashem Division from 1983 to 1986 and later headed the 14th Imam Hossein Division from 1986 to 1991. He was also the commander of the Thar-Allah Headquarters in Tehran and had been the deputy of IRGC operations. He was briefly the commander of the IRGC Air Force in 2005. On 21 January 2006, he was appointed as the commander of the IRGC Ground Forces. From 2007 to 2015, he headed the Quds Force in Syria and Lebanon.

=== Quds Force ===
In 2008, Soleimani appointed Zahedi to the position of commander of the Quds Force's Lebanon Corps for a second time. This tenure lasted until his assassination by Israel in 2024. Iran's involvement in the Syrian Civil War on the side of the government of Bashar al-Assad has been a source of contention for Israel. Irani advisors and Iran-backed fighters have aided in tipping the balance in favor of Assad's government. According to Al Jazeera, Israeli media had frequently published images of him along with Saeed Izadi, a top Iranian military liaison to Palestinians who was initially rumored to have been killed in the same strike, as the main IRGC-Quds Force officials sought by the country.

== Death ==
"Ultimately, he reached his longstanding wish for martyrdom. I cannot say anything other than he was rewarded by God."

— Zahedi's son on his father's death.

On 1 April 2024, Zahedi was killed by an Israeli airstrike that targeted the consulate annex building adjacent to the Iranian embassy in Syria's Damascus. Fifteen others were killed in the airstrike. The strike caused "massive destruction" to the consulate building as well as damage to neighbouring buildings, including the Canadian embassy. Zahedi is the most senior IRGC officer to have been killed since the assassination of Qasem Soleimani by the United States in January 2020. After his death, the spokesperson for the Ministry of Foreign Affairs of Iran condemned the attacks and said that the country reserves the right to execute a "decisive response" against the "aggressors" behind the airstrike, though the Israeli government avoided issuing any statements claiming responsibility.

=== Retaliation ===
On 13 April 2024, Iran launched hundreds of drones and ballistic missiles at Israel; the Israeli government stated that it intercepted 99% of the Iranian projectiles, but the attack critically injured a child. On 19 April 2024, Israel attacked an Iranian air defense system in response to the drone and missile barrage a week prior.

Military offices
Preceded by Ahmad Kazemi	Commander of the Revolutionary Guard Air Force; 25 August 2005 – 21 January 2006	Succeeded by Hossein Salami as Commander of Aerospace Force
Preceded by Ahmad Kazemi	Commander of the Revolutionary Guard Ground Force; 21 January 2006 – 13 July 2008	Succeeded by Mohammad Jafar Asadi
