= 58th Takavar Division of Shahroud =

58th Takavar Division
- لشگر ۵۸ تکاور
- Country: Iran
- Branch: Ground Force
- Type: Takavar
- Role: Special operations
- Size: Division
- Garrison/HQ: Shahroud, Semnan province
- Nickname: "Zolfaghar" (ذوالفقار)
- Engagements: Iran–Iraq War

Commanders
- Notable commanders: Yaghoub Aliyari; Ataollah Salehi

58th Takavar Division of Shahroud (Persian: لشکر تکاور ۵۸ ذوالفقار شاهرود) is a Takavar (commando) division of the Ground Forces of Islamic Republic of Iran Army based in Shahroud, Semnan province.

The founder and the first commander of the brigade was Yaghoub Aliyari.
