= 77th Infantry Division of Khurasan =

77th Infantry Division
- لشکر ۷۷ پیاده
- Country: Iran
- Branch: Ground Forces of Islamic Republic of Iran Army
- Type: Infantry
- Role: Combined arms
- Size: Division
- Garrison/HQ: Mashhad, Razavi Khorasan province
- Nickname: "Lashkare Pirooz-e Samen-ol-A'emeh" (The Victorious Division of Samen-ol-A'emeh)
- Equipment: M47 Patton; M48M Patton; BTR-50; T-72S
- Engagements: 1979 Kurdish rebellion Iran–Iraq War

Commanders
- Commander in Chief: Governor-General Yaghob-Ali Nazari
- Current commander: Second Brig. Gen. Ali Jahanshahi
- Notable commanders: Ataollah Salehi

77th "Pirooz-e Samen-ol-A'emeh" Infantry Division of Khorasan (Persian: لشکر پیاده ۷۷ پیروز ثامن‌الائمه خراسان) is an infantry division of the Ground Forces of Islamic Republic of Iran Army based in Mashhad, Razavi Khorasan province. It was formerly being called 77th Infantry Division of Khorasan and was renamed to "The Victor of Samen-ol-A'emeh" (پیروز ثامن‌الائمه Pirooz-e Samen-ol-A'emeh) later after the successful Operation Samen-ol-A'emeh during Iran–Iraq War, which was led by this division.

The history of the division dates back to the 1922-26 creation of five divisions by Reza Shah's reforms. Later the formation became the 9th East Division by the Imperial Iranian Ground Forces. In 1941, when the Soviet Red Army invaded Khorasan from the northern and northeastern borders of Iran in September, the various units of the 9th East Division in Mashhad used their facilities to resist the advance of the Soviet forces. Major General Mohtashemi's aim to defend the Mazduran Pass was thwarted, and the forces instructed to fall back on Tehran.

It was active during the Imperial Iranian regime during the 1970s. During the Iran–Iraq War the division fought in the Operation Fath ol-Mobin (March 1982), Operation Ramadan (July 1982), Operation Badr (March 1985), and Operation Karbala-6 in early 1987. One of the most famous episodes of the unit, came on May 9, 1982, when 6000 troops of this division were transported from Mashhad to Khuzestan in a single night. This was possible as a result of using the Boeing 747 Iran possessed as a military transport aircraft, setting a new world record in the air transport history.

== See also ==
- Hossein Lashkari, a pilot member in the "77th Khorasan Division"
