= 92nd Armored Division =

- Country: Iran
- Branch: Ground Forces of Islamic Republic of Iran Army
- Type: Armored
- Size: Division
- Garrison/HQ: Khuzestan province
- Equipment: M60A1 tanks T-72 tanks M113 APCS Zulfiqar (tank) Karrar (tank)
- Engagements: Iran–Iraq War; Twelve-Day War

Commanders
- Current commander: Brig. Gen. Ali Shahbazian
- Notable commanders: Masoud Monfared Niyaki Hasan Aghareb Parast Valiollah Fallahi

The 92nd Armored Division, also called 92nd Armored Division of Ahvaz or 92nd Armored Division of Khuzestan (Persian: لشکر ۹۲ زرهی اهواز), is an armored division of the Islamic Republic of Iran Army, first formed during the reign of the Shah.

In September 1980, among the units garrisoned along the Iraqi border, the IRIA had the 92nd Armored "Khuzestan" Division, with three armored brigades equipped with M60A1 MBTs and M113 APCs (including the 283rd Armored Cavalry Battalion), including the 1st Brigade west of Khorramshahr and south of Ahvaz, 2nd Brigade west of Dezful, and 3rd west of Ahvaz. The division fought in the Battle of Dezful in 1981 and Operation Ramadan in 1982. The division was later used in the Battle of the Marshes in 1984, mid-way through the Iran–Iraq War.

After the tank battle at Susangerd, captured British Chieftains of the 92nd Armoured Division were taken back to Baghdad for trials. According to retired General Aladdin Hussein Makki Khamas, attached to the 3rd Corps headquarters at the time, Iraqi tank sabot rounds "went through the front armour of the Chieftain and came out the backside".

Today the 92nd Armored Division is the only Iranian division that has enough tanks to be considered a true armored division, even by regional standards. Jane's Sentinel Country Risk Assessments says "equipped with T-72 tanks, this division is seen as the premier Iranian armored division. It is considered one of the best units in the Iranian Army, both in equipment and in combat capability. Personnel have been involved in patrolling the border with Iraq." Jane's says the division is part of the Army's South West Sector and is based at Ahvaz in Khuzestan Province.

During the Twelve-Day War, the Israel Defense Forces conducted strikes on 22 June 2025 which targeted the division.

== See also ==
- Hasan Aghareb Parast
