= Operation Karbala-3 =

1986 Iranian offensive during the Iran–Iraq War

Operation karbala-3
- Part of the Iran–Iraq War
Date	30 August – 2 September 1986
Location	Southern Iraq
Result	Iraqi victory: Iranian tactical failure; Iranian offensive defeated; Iraqi defensive and strategic victory

Belligerents
Iran	Iraq

Strength
2,000 men	Unknown

Casualties and losses
25 boats, heavy casualties	Unknown

Operation Karbala 3 (عملیات کربلای ۳, translit. Amaliyāt Karbalā-ye 3), also known as the Battle of Al-Ummiyah, was an Iranian military operation during the Iran–Iraq War, launched from 30 August – 2 September 1986 under the code name Hasbunallāh wa Ni‘mal Wakīl (حَسْبُنَا ٱللَّهُ وَنِعْمَ ٱلْوَكِيلُ).

The main impetus of the operation was to capture and destroy two Iraqi docks (Al-Umayyah and Al-Bakr). Alongside the main goal, there were other goals, too; amongst:

== Operation ==
The Iranians began the offensive on 30 August by attacking two Iraqi terminals with a large force of about 2,000 men from the Naval Revolutionary Guards in light boats armed with machine guns, rockets and mortars. The Iranians managed to take partial control of the Al-'Amiq installations and hold them for 24 hours.

The Iraqis launched a counterattack involving naval infantry, special forces and naval forces on 2 September which destroyed 25 Iranian boats, killed several Iranian soldiers and captured many more. One of the Iraqi shore-to-sea missile regiments fired missiles at the Iranian forces at al-'Amiq, forcing them to retreat from the port.

Iraq regained control and defeated an Iranian attempt to occupy the two ports and the northern gulf's naval battle arena. The Iraqi counterattack was highly successful due to the excellent coordination among the missile boats, artillery, missile units, helicopters, planes and port defense forces.

Iran attempted two additional attacks on al-'Amiq on the nights of 4–5 September and 21–22 November, however both were defeated by the Iraqi defense forces supported by air force planes.

== Claims by Iranian newspapers ==
Iranian newspapers claimed that the fulfillment of "operation WalFajr-8" by destruction of the most significant naval base of Iraq, aborting its access through the north of Persian Gulf; making a safe naval area for shipping; and performing a naval operation and indicating a powerful presentation of Islamic Revolutionary Guard Corps naval forces in Persian Gulf.

Iranian newspapers claimed that as a result of operation Karbala-3, Iranian forces captured more than 100 Iraqi combatants, and 63 Iraqi forces were killed. Meanwhile, Islamic Revolutionary Guard Corps of Iran annihilated 2 Iraqi fighter planes, a frigate, 15 anti-aircraft guns and 2 radar devices, plus obtaining 4 Iraqi radar devices. The operation finally finished after two days battle between Iran and Iraq.

== See also ==
- Operation Karbala-1
- Operation Karbala-2
- Operation Karbala-4
- Operation Karbala-5
- Operation Karbala-6
- Operation Karbala-7
- Operation Karbala-8
- Operation Karbala-9
- Operation Karbala-10
