= Operation Karbala-8 =

1987 Iran–Iraq War operation

Operation Karbala 8
- Part of the Iran–Iraq War
Date	7–12 April 1987
Location	Near Basra, Iraq
Result	Iraqi victory: Iranian offensive failed

Belligerents
Iraq	Iran

Commanders and leaders
(Ba'athist Iraq) Saddam Hussein	(Iran) Ruhollah Khomeini

Strength
Unknown	40,000 Pasdaran

Casualties and losses
20 dead, 200 wounded (Iranian chemical attacks)	250 killed (Iranian government claim)

Operation Karbala 8 was an operation which was commenced by Iran on 7 April 1987 with the name code "Ya Saheb al-Zaman" (Arabic: یا صاحب الزمان).

Operation Karbala 8 was launched with the goal of destruction of Iraqi forces, and strengthening the obtained positions of operation Karbala 5 in 5 days by Iran in the east of Basrah operation area (Shalamcheh) by the Islamic Revolutionary Guard Corps ground forces.

During the night of April 6 to 7, Iranian command attacked. 40,000 Iranian Pasdaran attempted to breach the last line of defense protecting access to Basra. The Iranian offensive failed as the Iraqis were trained in defensive combat and had stronger firepower. On April 9 and 12 the Iranian government, against past principles, tried to win the battle using chemical weapons. At nightfall Iranian artillery poured phosgene gas in the Iraqi 3rd Army Corps' sector. These bombings caused only minimal Iraqi losses of 20 dead and 200 wounded, and did not break the defensive layout around Basra.

Iran claimed that 250 persons from Iran and 5,000 persons from the Iraqi army were killed, and that 200 Iraqis were captured by Iranian forces -- as well as the spoils of war which were obtained by Iran. It also claimed that Iraqi forces used chemical weapons against Iran at this operation.

== See also ==
- Operation Karbala-1
- Operation Karbala-2
- Operation Karbala-4
- Operation Karbala-5
- Operation Karbala-6
- Operation Karbala-7
- Operation Karbala-9
- Operation Karbala-10
