= 33rd Al-Mahdi Division =

- لشکر 33 المهدی (عج)
- Active: 24 February 1982
- Country: Islamic Republic of Iran
- Branch: Islamic Revolutionary Guard Corps
- Type: Infantry
- Size: Division
- Garrison/HQ: Fars province
- Nickname: "Al-Mahdi" (المهدی (عج))
- Engagements: Iran–Iraq War: Operation Fath ol-Mobeen; Operation Beit ol-Moqaddas; Operation Dawn 1; Operation Dawn 2; Operation Kheibar; Operation Badr; Operation Dawn 8; Operation Karbala-4; Operation Karbala-5; Other unnamed operations

Commanders
- Notable commanders: Ali Fazli; Mohammad Jaafar Asadi; Mansour Haghdoust

The 33rd Al-Mahdi Division (Persian: لشکر 33 المهدی (عج), named after the twelfth Shia Imam, Al-Mahdi) was a brigade of the Islamic Revolutionary Guard Corps. It was established on 24 February 1982 before Operation Fath ol-Mobin in the Iran–Iraq War, with Ali Fazli as its commander. It was part of the 7th Fajr Division for some time during the war. After Operation Beit ol-Moqaddas, there was some reform in the structure of the brigade, and Mohammad Jaafar Asadi was made as the commander, and remained the commander of the unit until the end of the war. On 24 April 1983 the brigade was separated from the 19th Fajr Division and became part of the newly founded 7th Corps. The brigade was turned into the 33rd Al-Mahdi Division (لشکر 33 المهدی (عج)) after the successful Operation Dawn 8.

After Iraq's adoption of new defensive tactics in 1986, Iran begin creating new "Qaem" units, and the independent 326th Qaem Unit of Fars (یگان قائم 326 فارس) was founded on 25 May 1986 under command of Abdol-Ali Najafi, which were consisted of forces from the 33rd Division. It was stationed in Haj Omran area in the Shahid Sadr Highlands. It also participated in Operation Karbala-2. It was later merged with the Al-Mahdi Division.

After the Iran-Iraq war, the Al-Mahdi Division was separated into two units: the 33rd Al-Mahdi Airborne Brigade (تیپ 33 هوابرد المهدی (عج)) under command of Hojjatollah Azarpeykan, stationed in Jahrom County, Fars province; and the 3rd Ansar-ol-Hojjat Brigade (تیپ 3 انصارالحجه), as part of 19th Fajr Division, under command of Abdol-Ali Najafi stationed in Fasa County, Fars Province. The 33rd Al-Mahdi Airborne Brigade has been active in the Iran–PJAK conflict.
