= Abdul-Wahid Shannan ar-Ribat =

Iraqi general

- عبد الواحد شنان آل رباط
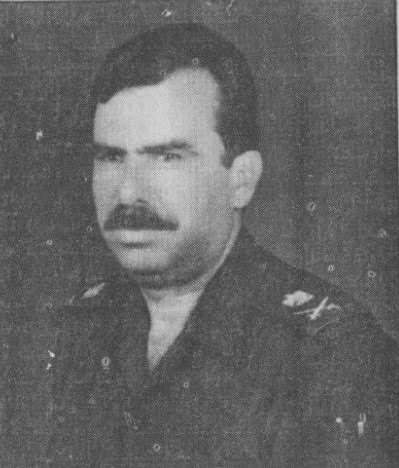
- Ribat in the late 1980s, as Commander of the Iraqi Army's 6th Corps.
- Born: 12 April 1944 (age 82); Samawah, Iraq
- Military career
- Allegiance: Ba'athist Iraq
- Branch: Iraqi Army
- Service years: 1964–2003
- Rank: General
- Commands: 12th Armored division 39th mountaineers division 29th infantry division 11th infantry division Baghdad division from the Republican Guards 6th Corps 4th Corps The Chief of staff of the Iraqi army (1995-1999)
- Conflicts: Second Iraqi–Kurdish War; Iran–Iraq War; Operation Dawn 5; Operation Dawn 6; Second Battle of al-Faw; Operation Karbala-4; Operation Karbala-8; Battle of the Marshes; Tawakalna ala Allah Operations; Siege of Basra; Gulf War; Iraqi invasion of Kuwait; Battle of Khafji; 2003 invasion of Iraq

Abdul-Wahid Shannan ar-Ribat (Arabic: عبد الواحد شنان آل رباط) is a former Iraqi Army general.

Ribat, a Shiite, is from the city of Samawah in Muthanna province. He served as Governor of Nineveh from 17 September 1993 to 13 December 1995, during the reign of Saddam Hussein. He then served as Chief of Staff of the Iraqi Army (from 1995 to 1999).

He later went on to become the Governor of Nineveh for the 2nd term (on 8 May 2001), in which capacity he served until the appointment of the new governor by U. S. military administration on 5 May 2003 (after U. S. military occupation of the territory of Iraq, as a result of 2003 invasion of Iraq).

== Reported death ==
On 14 June 2014 an Iraqi government spokesperson claimed Ribat was killed in a government airstrike on Mosul as part of the 2014 Northern Iraq Offensive. Ribat's family however refuted this, and claimed that he was alive and well in the United Arab Emirates, and had no contact with militant groups active in Iraq.

== Prosecution of British government ministers ==
In 2016, he launched a private prosecution of the British Prime Minister, Tony Blair, at the time of the invasion of Iraq, as well as the Foreign Secretary, Jack Straw, and the Attorney General, Lord Goldsmith. He alleged that they had committed the crime of aggression by invading Iraq and based his evidence, in part, on the Chilcot Inquiry report. He was represented by Michael Mansfield, QC, a prominent lawyer. His attempt to have the defendants arrested was dismissed by a District Judge at Westminster Magistrates Court in November 2016, but this has been appealed. The current Attorney General has intervened in the case to argue against. In July 2017, the London High Court ruled the prosecution had failed for three reasons: (1) In 2006, the Law Lords had ruled that the crime of aggression is in fact not a crime in England and Wales; (2) The accused had governmental immunity at the time of their actions; (3) Ar-Ribat had not obtained the permission of the sitting UK Attorney General.
