= Esmail Daghayeghi =

Islamic Republic Revolutionary Guards commander

- Born: 1954; Behbahan, Khuzestan Province, Imperial State of Iran
- Died: 18 January 1987 (age 32–33); Shatt Al-Arab district, Basra Governorate, Ba'athist Iraq
- Relatives: Tayebeh Hamrahi (his wife)
- Military career
- Allegiance: Islamic Republic of Iran
- Branch: Revolutionary Guards
- Nickname: Shahid (Martyr) Daghayeghi
- Conflicts: Iran–Iraq War; Operation Beit ol-Moqaddas (WIA); Operation Fath ol-Mobin (WIA); Operation Kheibar (WIA); Operation Badr (1985); Operation Karbala-2; Operation Karbala-4; Siege of Basra †
- Awards: Order of Fath

Esmail Daghayeghi (Persian: اسماعیل دقایقی) (1954, Behbahan – 1987 in Shalamcheh) Iranian military commander in the Islamic Republic Revolutionary Guard Corps (IRGC) during the Iran-Iraq War and military figure of the war.

Daghayeghi (Daqayeqi) who is known as the founder of the Badr Division, was born into a religious family in 1954 in the city Behbabah, Khuzestan. After finishing his high-school education, he got a job at the conservatory of the National Oil Company. When the Iran-Iraq War broke out, he joined the IRGC and fought in several battles and operations in the war. Daghayeghi was fatally hit by a missile fired by an Iraqi fighter jet during the Siege of Basra while exploring Shalamcheh, and ultimately died on 18 January 1987.

== See also ==
- Mohsen Rezaee
- Ali Hashemi (commander)
- Gholam Ali Rashid
