= Mansour Haghdoust =

Iranian military commander (1962–2001)

- Born: 13 March 1962; Abadan, Imperial State of Iran
- Died: 3 December 2001 (aged 39); Jahrom, Iran
- Education: PhD in Physics
- Occupations: Iranian military commander (Brigadier General); University lecturer
- Known for: Establishing Basij networks throughout Iran; Commander in Iran-Iraq war; Unification of Fars province; IRGC forces
- Military career
- Conflicts: 1979 Kurdish Rebellion; Iran-Iraq war

Mansour Haghdoust (1962–2001) was an Iranian IRGC commander and one of the first IRGC members to become an acting commander during the Iran–Iraq War. After the war he started studying in physics and was granted a PhD in Quantum mechanics from the University of Kashan. Notable Iranian generals such as Ahmad Kazemi and Mohammad Bagheri have called him the father of Sunni Basij and the Godfather of Iranian Paramilitary forces. He died in the year 2001 because of severe injuries to his kidneys by Chemical warfare. He was one of the commanders of 33rd Al-Mahdi Division and the deputy commander of 8th Najaf Ashraf Division, 27th Mohammad Rasulullah Division and 31st Ashura Division.

== Life ==
=== Childhood ===
Haghdoust was born on 14 March 1962 in the city of Abadan. he was the youngest child in his family of eleven children. His father Abu-Al-Hassan Abbasi was a chief examiner in National Iranian Oil Company in Abadan; he was a very conservative supporter of the ruling monarch in Iran Mohammad Reza Pahlavi. Haghdoust on the other hand was a supporter of the new Islamic movement which later resulted in Iranian revolution and participated in many of the events which later was acknowledged as revolutionary acts. His childhood was mostly about attending Mosques and sharing the new revolutionary news to other youth in Abadan.

=== IRGC career ===
Field Commander (Equivalents brigadier General) Haghdoust joined IRGC in the beginning of the revolution as a peacekeeping member against the possible rebellions. In 1979 he joined the Imam Khomeini's red scarfs paramilitary forces to stop the 1979 Kurdish rebellion in Iran. He then joined the Iran–Iraq War in the year 1981 as a frontline. He served in IRGC frontline for about 6 years and was a participant and deputy chief in combat in many important operations like Operation Ramadan, Operation Karbala-6 etc. He became the deputy commander of IRGC joint forces on west Shalamcheh and while heading to an operational field they were attacked by Iraqi aircraft, using Chemical weaponry and bombs which poisoned him and his 130 combatants, caused him to retire from the frontline of the war. Later after the incident he was awarded the rank of deputy commander of 8th Najaf Ashraf Division. In his IRGC career Haghdoust became a deputy commander of 27th Mohammad Rasulullah Division, 8th Armored and Infantary Division and 31st Ashura Division. His most notable time in IRGC was when he became the deputy commander of 33rd Al-Mahdi Division and later the IRGC chief in command in Jahrom, in which he started to organize the IRGC forces around the Fars province and was awarded the honorary rank of Brigadier general.

=== Basij and legacy ===
Haghdoust is known as the father of Sunni Basij militias because he started the campaign which later on became the first start for this paramilitary force. He is known as one of the Basij godfathers as he organized and militarized Basij in may rural areas in Iran including villages and small towns. He was one of the main spiritual leaders of Basij and inspired a lot of "Basijis" like Mohsen Hojaji. He was named the father of Basij by Ahmad Kazemi and Mohammad Bagheri during his years of service.

=== Education ===
After Haghdoust came back from Iran–Iraq War, despite his severe kidney and lung injuries due to Chemical warfare effects, he joined the Kashan University as a part-time student and started studying in physics. He graduated with a PhD in Quantum mechanics and later on used the degree to teach part time in Shiraz University, Islamic Azad University, Najafabad Branch and Jahrom University.

=== Death ===
During the war, Haghdoust was exposed to Mustard gas to such an extent that it remained present in his lungs and kidneys and slowly released into his body in the years after. In 2001, his body became unable to tolerate the level of chemicals in his blood and he experienced a seizure, later being transferred to Peimani hospital in Jahrom, where he died of complications related to his Mustard gas exposure.

== Political stance ==
Haghdoust started to change his political stance after Iranian student protests in July 1999 and left the IRGC. For his "betrayal of the coat of arms of Iran" he was sentenced to House arrest and he was not able to leave his house until his death at 2001; his name started to vanish from the revolutionary books and news; slowly he disappeared from the center of attention to just another imprisoned political activist.

== Battles and operations ==
- Operation Badr (1985)
- Operation Beit ol-Moqaddas
- Operation Ramadan
- Operation Valfajr
- Operation Karbala-6
- Operation Karbala-4
- Operation Ruhollah (Intelligence operation)
- Operation Sar-Allah (intelligence operation)
- Operation Mahd (a series of guerrilla warfare and over-border intelligence operation)

== Participations ==
- 8th Najaf Ashraf Division
- 33rd Al-Mahdi Division
- 27th Mohammad Rasulullah Division
- 31 Ashura Heavy Division
- Tharallah Brigade
- 66th airborne IRGC division
- 21st Division (Iran)
