= Abdolrasoul Zarrin =

Iranian Sniper in Iran-Iraq war)

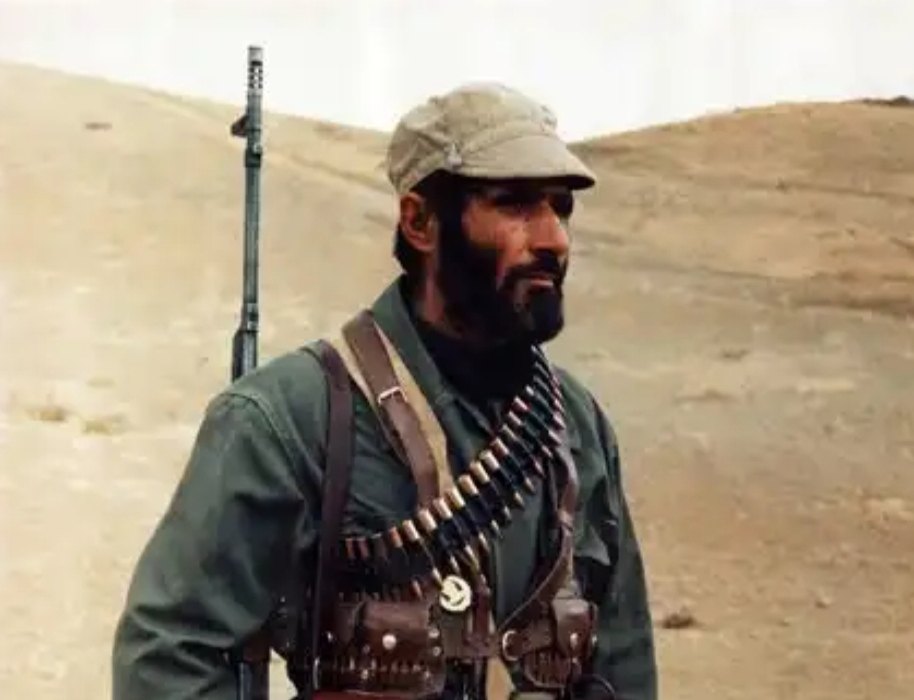
- Zarrin with SVD (rifle)
- Born: 21 March 1941; Dehdasht, Kohgiluyeh, Pahlavi Iran
- Died: March 1, 1984 (aged 42); Talayeh, the main axis of Operation Kheibar
- Burial place: Golestan Shohada of Isfahan
- Children: 4 boys and 3 girls
- Military career
- Allegiance: Iran
- Branch: Islamic Revolutionary Guard Corps
- Nickname: One-man battalion
- Unit: 14th Imam Hossein Division
- Known for: Most famous sniper of the Iran-Iraq War

Abdolrasoul Zarrin (Persian: عبدالرسول زرین; 21 March 1941 – 1 March 1984) was an Iranian sniper in the Iran-Iraq War who was killed during the second phase of Operation Kheibar. His military service also included an 80-month presence in the 1979 Kurdish rebellion in Iran. He is considered to be the most famous Iranian sniper, but there is considerable doubt about the exact number of successful shots he made.

== Life ==
Abdul Rasul Zarrin was born on 21 March 1941 in a village on the outskirts of Dehdasht, Kohgiluyeh. His father died when he was four, and his mother died when he was six. He was then raised by his uncle. As a teenager, he found his paternal relatives in Isfahan and settled with them. Abdul Rasul eventually opened a clothing store near the "Baba Ali Asgar Mosque" in Isfahan and began selling clothes. He started a family in Isfahan at the age of 20 and had seven children. He joined the Islamic Revolutionary Guard Corps in Isfahan when the 1979 Kurdish rebellion in Iran began and was initially sent to the west of the country. After a while, he went to the war zones in the south and participated in operations alongside Husayn Kharrazi and Yahya Rahim Safavi. He was killed on 1 March 1984, in the second phase of the Khyber Operation.

== Number of shots ==
Zarrin is confirmed as having 67 successful shots, but oral histories have claimed much higher numbers.

== In culture ==
Many books have been written about Abdolrasoul Zarrin and television documentaries have been produced about him by Iranian media. In 2020, a documentary titled The Single-Person Battalion, directed by Dariush Yari, was broadcast on Channel One. Hadi Moghadamdoost played the role of Zarrin in this documentary.

In 2020, The Sniper, a film directed by Ali Ghaffari and produced by Ebrahim Asghari and the Ravayat-e Fath Foundation, was released. The film was first screened at the 39th Fajr Film Festival and won the Crystal Simorgh for Best Film from a National Perspective and Best Field Special Effects. Mehdi Tehrani, a film critic and lecturer, wrote of the film:

"The tone of a war film relies heavily on its characters. In “The Sniper,” we encounter Abdolrasoul Zarrin. In sacred defense films, it is customary for every fighter, regardless of height or age, to appear as a complete mystic. This trend is not possible. This frame has never been achieved and will never work. When you successfully portray courage, duty, and patriotism, you have won. We cannot add anything to the rules of the genre. In a war film, there is no such thing as a mystic sniper. You cannot be in war and shed blood and at the same time be a seeker. You can be in war and do propaganda, relief, and aid work and then be a seeker (remember the film Hacksaw Ridge). The trend that The Sniper relies on is this very wrong idea."
