= Operation Dawn 7 =

1984 Iran–Iraq War operation

Date	18–22 October 1984 (5 days)
Location	Chazabeh
Result	Inconclusive

Belligerents
Iran	Iraq

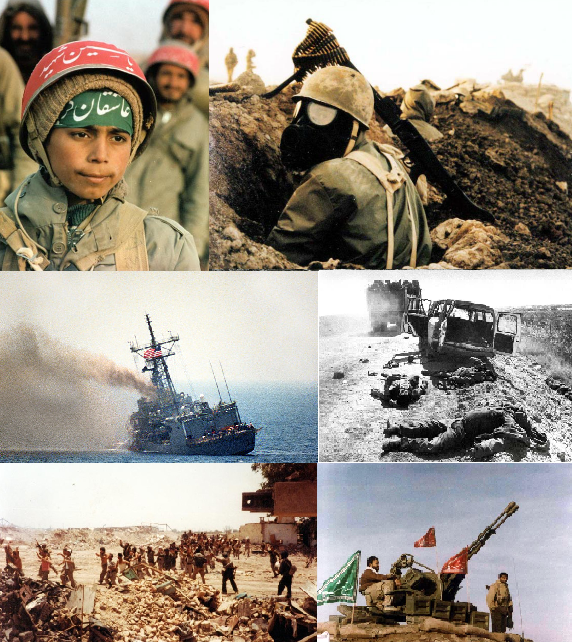
Child soldiers on Iranian front (top left); Iranian soldier wearing a gas mask (top right); Port quarter view of USS Stark listing to port after being mistakenly struck by an Iraqi warplane (middle left); PMOI forces killed in Operation Mersad (middle right); Iraqi prisoners of war after the re-capture of Khorramshahr by Iranians (below left); ZU-23-2 being used by the Iranian Army (below right).

Operation Dawn 7 (Operation Walfajr-7; Persian: عملیات والفجر 7) was an offensive launched by Iran during Iran–Iraq War. It was aborted after just a few days of fighting due to the specific conditions of the region/war, such as: releasing water at the region by the Iraqi forces, etc.

The (military) code of the operation was "Ya Zahra" (یازهرا); and the considered operational areas were consisted of Chazabeh which was located in the distance of 110 km to the north west of Ahwaz and Chilat (Dehloran). (At the area of Zeid and Kooshk, where was located at the geographical location of --the north of-- Hosseinieh station.)

The operation, which had originally been planned to take place after Operation Operation Dawn-6, was ultimately completed before it even began, due to the specific circumstances of the operation. After Operation Dawn-7, the campaign proceeded to the next phase with Operation Dawn-8 (Operation Walfajr-8), which was launched on 9 February 1986 on the southern front in the Abadan (Faw) region.

== See also ==
- Operation Dawn-6
- Operation Dawn-8
