= 2026 European refrigerator hacks =

- Countries affected by the attacks.
- Date: 11 October and 2 November 2026
- Location: Europe
- Type: Hacking
- Motive: Unknown
- Target: Refrigerators and freezers
- Outcome: Discard of vast stocks of spoiled goods
- Property damage: €10 million+ (estimated)
- Accused: Shahid Kaveh (Iran); Unnamed groups in China and Russia

In October and November of 2026, European retail and cold storage facilities faced widespread disruptions as refrigeration and freezer systems across the continent were targeted in a series of cyberattacks.

The first attack occurred on 11 October 2026, when an unknown party hacked into the refrigeration controllers at up to 700 French supermarkets and set them to defrost mode overnight, causing their refrigerators to overheat. The cold chain disruption forced the French supermarkets to discard vast stocks of spoiled goods, resulting in losses estimated to total tens of millions of euros.

On 2 November 2026, a second attack on refrigeration and freezer systems hit a large number of supermarkets throughout Europe. Three blood banks of the national French Blood Establishment (EFS) were also attacked, but attempts were thwarted before blood plasma could be damaged.

The refrigeration controllers by Danfoss each ran a web server reachable over the public internet, many of them accessible using login credentials 'admin' as the username and the current date as the password.

On 9 November at the 2026 Paris G7 summit the French foreign minister Jean-Noël Barrot accused Iran of the attack that occurred in France, specifically the Islamic Revolutionary Guard Corps (IRGC) and the Shahid Kaveh cyberwarfare organization.

== Background ==
In 2025, cybersecurity firm Claroty's Team 82 had already found multiple vulnerabilities within Danfoss control systems: The refrigerator controllers had a publicly reachable web server with a login screen that could be accessed with the username 'admin' and a hidden "code of the day" function that allowed users to bypass the password by inputting the device's date in its place. Danfoss disclosed Claroty's findings on 24 March 2025 and began their own investigation. In August 2025, Danfoss issued a software release 4.3.1 to their AK‑SM800A series of models which patched the vulnerabilities. AK-SM800A models were unaffected by the hack, except those which had not been updated with R4.3.1.

On 9 August 2026, Amir Zaltzman, a Claroty Team82 senior vulnerability researcher, presented at DEF CON 34 about vulnerabilities in Danfoss and Copeland refrigeration controllers.

In August 2026, a number of United States military base DeCA commissary freezers heated and spoiled food, which the US has investigated as possible cyberattacks. The US government suspected Iran at the time.

== Timeline ==
=== 11 October ===
On the night of 11 October 2026, over 300 Intermarché and Netto stores, 80 Coopérative U, 80 Carrefour stores, around 30 Monoprix stores, several E.Leclerc stores, and others were struck in a large-scale cyberattack. The supermarkets' refrigeration systems were compromised and instructed to enter an unusual defrost cycle with their contents still inside. The hack went unnoticed as it did not activate alarms and many employees were not present at the time to stop it. Refrigerators overheated due to the continuous defrosting, with many climbing up to 50°C (122°F) after six hours. A supermarket in Normandy reported some of its refrigerators had reached 80 °C (176 °F).

At some supermarkets, the intense heat caused refrigeration equipment to melt or even catch fire. Water damage from fire sprinkler systems also occurred. Across France, whole aisles of refrigerated produce and frozen goods were ruined and had to be disposed of due to food safety concerns. An Intermarché supermarket in Issy-les-Moulineaux alone disposed of several tons of products. Disruptions in the groceries sector occurred in neighboring Belgium, the Netherlands, and to some extent in the United States.

Two outlets in Alsace alone reported a combined loss of €270,000. The total damage was estimated to have been tens of millions of euros. The Dutch Ahold Delhaize group of retailers said that quarterly sales could be reduced by as much as €250 million ($281 million).

The hack was unprecedented, being the first cyber attack to have a real-world effect on a nation's food distribution system.

=== 2 November ===
On 2 November 2026, a similar cyberattack on refrigeration and freezer systems occurred, this time disrupting over 115 supermarkets across various countries in Europe. In Ireland, 13 SuperValu stores were impacted. Belgium was one of the most heavily affected countries. Approximitely 15 Carrefour stores, 15 Intermarchés and 5 SPARs were affected. Dozens of Ahold Delhaize locations were affected in Belgium and well as in Luxembourg. In Sweden, ICA, one of the main targets in the country, confirmed that Danfoss controllers were likely the reason for the attack. Over 20 ICA locations were affected while another retailer, Coop, reported 7 incidents. In the Netherlands, at least 17 local shops and food businesses reported attacks. In Italy, among affected were four Coop stores in Sicily. Seven Intermarché supermarkets were hit in Portugal. In Estonia, at least one supermarket reported abnormal temperature settings on refrigerators. In Finland, the Kesko group investigated irregular refrigerator activity in a few smaller grocery stores belonging to the company. In Germany, among affected supermarkets were Edeka and CAP Markets. In Romania, a possible cyberattack affecting six shops belonging to the same retail chain was reported. In the UK a number of food production businesses reported incidents. Poland also reported an attack, although the target has not been publicly identified..

==== Blood banks ====
Blood plasma intended for transfusions at three blood banks of the French Blood Establishment (EFS) in France was also targeted in an attempt to heat their refrigerators to 110 °C. Staff were able to intervene after their monitoring system activated, preventing the blood plasma from being destroyed. The EFS's supplier of refrigeration was Coolworld, which stated the vulnerability concerned "a component supplied by a third-party".

== Investigation and analyses ==
Prime Minister of France Sébastien Lecornu instructed the Agence nationale de la sécurité des systèmes d'information (ANSSI) to investigate the cyberattack and coordinate with other European countries to prevent further hacks. Supermarkets in France commonly outsource refrigeration to third-party companies and cannot manage security measures. Investigators identified AK‑SM800 and AK‑SC355 refrigerator regulator systems by Danish manufacturer Danfoss to be the attack surface. Other controllers found to be affected were Copeland XWEB and Dixell XWEB by Copeland. AK‑SC355 had reached end-of-life in 2016 and AK‑SM800 in May 2021, and were no longer supported with updates. Danfoss had previously advised replacing both of the deprecated models with new ones.

Investigations in October found the same vulnerabilities within supermarkets throughout Europe, including Belgium, Germany, Luxembourg, the Netherlands, Portugal, Poland, and Spain. Chains in Belgium and the Netherlands reported various IT disruptions of websites, distribution centers, and other critical operations. In the U.S., the Dutch Ahold Delhaize chains Stop & Shop and Food Lion reported IT disruptions and took some systems offline, though not as comprehensively as France.

The Food Protection and Defense Institute of the University of Minnesota noted of legacy systems that "Many industrial control systems used in the food industry are quite old, highly customized, and were not designed with security in place or with the ability to be made secure through updating.". Ken Munro of Pen Test Partners speculated that the culprits could have been "kids messing around," due to ease of the exploit; state actors such as Iran and Russia also possess the capability, sabotage being a known standard method of operation.

On November 9, French Foreign Minister Jean-Noël Barrot accused Iran's Revolutionary Guard Corps of carrying out the hack and said the Iranian ambassador had been summoned to the Foreign Ministry. He also threatened to escalate EU sanctions against Iran. Cited evidence were IP addresses linked to Iran, traces of Farsi, and an "attack infrastructure previously associated with the unit". Microsoft had suspected Iran as the culprit in the October incident. Italian defense minister Guido Crosetto stated a day later that amongst the specialists identified there were unnamed groups from Iran, China and Russia; he clarified he believed that this did not necessarily mean the governments were directly involved with the groups, despite them being their countries of origin or operation.

Regarding the follow-up attacks on supermarket fridges across Europe in November no perpetrators have been identified.

== Reactions ==
European Commissioner for Agriculture and Food Christophe Hansen commented generically on the attack, saying that "Food security requires more attention at all levels" and that the "exploitation of food has become a reality." Coopérative U CEO Dominique Schelcher described the cyberattack as "unprecedented", "unacceptable," and "extremely serious".

On 4 November, Richard Horne, from the National Cyber Security Centre (United Kingdom), part of GCHQ opined that this was just "the beginning" as AI was now able to find and abuse vulnerabilities in old technology. In the UK, devices delivered with default passwords have been considered non-compliant since 2024.

On 5 November, the US Cybersecurity and Infrastructure Security Agency (CISA), the FBI, Health and Human Services, U.S. Department of Agriculture (USDA), and the Department of Transportation (DoT) warned about ongoing threats against cold chains.

Deutschlandfunk reported on November 7 that the German secret services (Federal Office for the Protection of the Constitution and Federal Intelligence Service) were investigating.

== See also ==
- 2026 European bomb threat wave
- Cyberattacks against infrastructure
- List of cyberattacks
- November 2026 technology outages
- 2026 Binance hack
- List of supermarket chains in Europe
