= Arthur Berger =

Arthur Berger may refer to:

- Arthur Asa Berger (born 1933), American social scientist
- Arthur Berger (composer) (1912–2003), American composer

== See also ==
- Artur Berger (1892–1981), Austrian-Soviet film architect
