= Operation Dawn 2 =

1983 Iran–Iraq War operation

- Part of Iran–Iraq War – the Northern Front
Date	22–24 July 1983 (3 days)
Location	Iraqi Kurdistan
Status	Iranian victory: Tactical Iraqi failure; Iraqi counter-attack fails
Territorial changes	Iran captures strategic Haj Omran highlands

Belligerents
Iraq	Iran; Kurdistan Democratic Party (KDP)

Commanders and leaders
	(Iran) Hujjat-ul-Islam Mostafa Raddanipoor † (commander of 14th Imam Hossein Division) (Iran) Mahmoud Kaveh (commander of 155th Shohada Special Brigade); Massoud Barzani; See #Order of battle for more

Units involved
See #Order of battle	See #Order of battle

Strength
24 infantry battalions 4 commando and special forces battalions 4 border guard battalions	Pasdaran: 16 infantry battalions Army: 6 infantry battalions 1 mechanized battalion 1,500 militiamen KDP: 800 Peshmerga

Casualties and losses
- Several thousand killed

Operation Dawn 2 or Operation Valfajr-2 (Persian: عملیات والفجر 2) was an Iranian operation during the eight-year-long Iran–Iraq War. This operation opened a new front in northern Iraq/Iraqi Kurdistan also known as "the Northern Front". Despite Turkish help, this region was Iraq's weak point during the war as the Kurds sided with Iran.

== Prelude ==
In the year leading up to the operation, fighting between Iraqi and Iranian forces drew to a stalemate on the southern front. Iranian forces repeatedly used human wave attacks in the southern marshlands and deserts, only to be repulsed by forces of the Iraqi Third, Fourth, and Sixth Corps. However, the Iranian government managed to win favor of the Kurdish people in parts of northern Iraq, thus allowing the opportunity to take the war north.

The main objective of the mission was the frontier town of Haj Omran, which was nestled on the border and surrounded by mountainous terrain. Rebels of the Kurdistan Democratic Party of Iraq would prove a great asset to the advancing Iranians, given their knowledge of the terrain and the people.

== The battle ==
On July 22, Iranian forces advanced from Piranshahr and were highly successful against the Iraqis, effectively seizing Haj Omran in the process. The Iranians and Kurdish guerrillas made use of elevated ridges to launch ambushes on Iraqi positions and convoys. In all, they seized roughly 150 square miles (390 km^{2}) of Iraqi territory.

Iraq responded with counteroffensive, launching an airborne assault and employing the use of poison gas for the first time in the entire war. The Iraqis hit Iranian troops on mountain tops near Haj Omran with mustard gas while their troops advanced in the slopes. The Iraqis were unfamiliar with the properties of poison gas and the agent descended back down to the exposed Iraqi troops. At the same time, the rugged terrain held up Iraqi tanks. The use of helicopter gunships was also hampered, since the Iranian and Kurdish fighters had better cover.

These were the deciding factors that contributed to Iraq's loss of the battle.

== Order of battle ==
Iran

Malik Ashtar Command

- Islamic Republic of Iran Army
  - Islamic Republic of Iran Army Ground Forces
    - 77th "Pirooz" Infantry Division of Khorasan
      - 2nd Infantry Brigade of Quchan
        - 3 infantry battalions
    - 92nd Armored Division of Khuzestan
      - 1 mechanized battalion
    - 64th Infantry Division of Urmia
      - 1st Brigade
        - 1 infantry battalion
  - Islamic Republic of Iran Army Aviation
- Islamic Revolutionary Guard Corps
  - 14th Imam Hossein Division
    Commanded by Hujjat-ul-Islam Mostafa Raddanipoor
    - 2 infantry battalions
  - 33rd Al-Mahdi Brigade
    Commanded by Mohammad Jaafar Asadi
    - Fajr Battalion
      Commanded by Morteza Javidi
    - 9 other unnamed infantry battalions
  - 155th Shohada Special Brigade
    Commanded by Mahmoud Kaveh
    - 2 infantry battalions
  - 8th Najaf Ashraf Division
    Commanded by Ahmad Kazemi
    - 2 infantry battalions
- Artillery unit
  - 11 artillery batteries
- Jihad of Construction
- Basij
- Gendarmerie
- Local tribal fighters

Kurdistan Democratic Party (KDP)

- Peshmerga
  - 1,000 militia fighters

Iraq

- 91st Infantry Brigade
- 98th Infantry Brigade
- 66th Infantry Brigade
- 1 tank battalion
- 31st Special Forces Brigade
  - 2nd Battalion
- Tariq Commando Battalion
- Ta'im Commando Battalion
