= Joseph Baratta =

American businessman

- Born: 1971; Sacramento, CA
- Education: Georgetown University, BA
- Occupation: Private equity executive
- Employer: Blackstone
- Organization: Las Vegas Raiders (minority owner)
- Title: Global Head of Blackstone Private Equity Strategies
- Board member of: Blackstone; Medline; Merlin Entertainments; Georgetown University

Joseph Baratta is an American businessman. He is the global head of private equity strategies and a director at the asset management firm Blackstone and the founder of the Baratta Center for Global Business Education at Georgetown University's McDonough School of Business.

== Early life and education ==
Baratta was born in Sacramento, California to Jill and Joseph Patrick Baratta. He graduated from Jesuit High School in 1989 and in 1993 graduated magna cum laude from Georgetown University.

== Career ==
=== 1994-2001: Early career ===
Baratta began his career as an analyst in Morgan Stanley's mergers and acquisitions group. He turned his focus to private equity in 1994, joining the investment firm McCown De Leeuw and Co., and later Tinicum.

In 1998, he was hired as a private equity associate at Blackstone. He moved from New York to London to establish Blackstone's European private equity business in 2001.

=== 2001-2012: Merlin Entertainments, Center Parcs Europe, Sea World Parks & Entertainment ===
In London, Baratta pursued a buy-and-build strategy in European leisure properties. In 2005, he led the £102.5 million acquisition of Merlin Entertainments, which then operated 28 branded attractions across nine European countries. Legoland Parks, the Madame Tussauds Group, and the Italian theme park operator Gardaland were subsequently acquired,and Merlin expanded to 50 locations in Europe, the United States, and Asia, becoming the second-largest theme park company in the world.

With the success of acquisitions including Center Parcs Europe; Sea World Parks & Entertainment; and Southern Cross, Baratta became known for "buying small companies and building them into multi-billion pound operations." He was named head of Blackstone's private equity division in Europe in 2010.

=== 2012-present: Head of global private equity strategies ===
Baratta was appointed head of global private equity strategies in 2012. Since then, he has been involved with many of the largest transactions in Blackstone's private equity portfolio, including Medline, Copeland, Jersey Mike's,Refinitiv,and Candle Media, in addition to Merlin. In 2024 he was named head of Blackstone private equity strategies, overseeing all private equity operations including the control buyout fund, Blackstone Capital Partners and Core Private Equity Partners; and funds focused on energy transition, Asia buyouts, tactical opportunities, growth equity and life sciences.

Baratta helped to develop initiatives at Blackstone including an employee ownership program that grants equity to most employees at U.S. companies acquired in future private equity transactions. The program was initiated with 18,000 employees in 43 countries at climate-technologies company Copeland,which Blackstone acquired from Emerson Electric for $14 billion in 2023.

In 2023, Blackstone became the first alternative asset manager to join the S&P 500. During Baratta's tenure, Its private equity business grew from $50 billion to $454 billion assets under management.

In September 2026 he announced his intention to leave Blackstone at the end of the year.

== Boards ==
Baratta holds board positions at Blackstone, Medline, Merlin Entertainments, and Georgetown University. He serves on the McDonough School of Business advisory board, and is a board director for Year Up, a non-profit providing career development opportunities for young adults, and Hotchkiss, a secondary school.
