= Mahmoud Kaveh =

- General Kaveh in 1981
- Born: 22 May 1961; Mashhad, Imperial State of Iran
- Died: 2 September 1986 (aged 25); Ahvaz, Iran
- Burial place: Behesht-e Zahra
- Military career
- Allegiance: Iran
- Branch: IRGC
- Service years: 1981–1986
- Commands: 155th Shohada Special Forces Brigade
- Conflicts: Iran–Iraq War; Operation Dawn 2; Operation Dawn-4; Operation Badr (1985); Operation Dawn 9; Operation Ghader; Operation Karbala-2

Mahmoud Kaveh (22 May 1961 – 2 September 1986) was an Iranian military commander in the Islamic Revolutionary Guard Corps and one of the main figures in Iran–Iraq War.

== Early life ==
Kaveh born on 22 May 1961 in Mashhad. His father was a religious businessman in Mashhad during the Shah's regime. His father was connected with Ali Khamenei and Abdolkarim Hasheminejad. He emphasised the importance of bringing up his son religiously and would take him to pray in the mosque and participate in religious gatherings. Alongside studying in high school, he started studying religious sciences in Mashhad Hawza.

=== 1979 revolution ===
With the rise of anti-regime activities, Kaveh, who was an active religious youth, would attend the speeches of Ali Khamenei in the Imam Hassan Mojtaba and Javad ul-A'imeh mosques which were central places for anti-regime activities. He tried a lot to change the minds of his classmates and show them the oppression committed by the Shah's regime. He actively distributed Ruhollah Khomeini's flyers and participated in all anti-regime protests.

== After revolution of 1979 ==
After Islamic revolution, Kaveh was one of the first people to join the IRGC from Mashhad. He underwent training for six months. After this, he was dispatched to Tehran as one of Ruhollah Khomeini's personal guards.

=== Iran–Iraq War ===
Kaveh was 19 when Iran–Iraq War was started. He was dispatched to the southern war zones, but due to a lack of military training, he was sent back to Mashhad and underwent intensive training. It was difficult for him not to attend the war, so he decided to go to the Kurdistan Province to quell the anti-revolutionary spirit in the province. Soon, due to his competence and courage, he was appointed as the operation commander of the IRGC in Saqqez.

=== 155th Shohada Special Forces Brigade ===
When the 155th Shohada Special Forces Brigade was established, Kaveh was appointed as its operation commander. In a short time, he managed to liberate many different regions that were previously occupied by the anti-revolutionary forces. For example:

- liberation of Bukan and its main road
- liberation of the road between Shahin Dezh County and Takab
- liberation of the strategic axis between Piranshahr Sardasht, West Azerbaijan
- liberation of Alvatan mountain
- liberation of Doleto Prison.

== Responsibilities ==
- Military training instructor (1981–1982)
- Head of Guards of Ruhollah Khomeini (1982)
- Operations Officer of Vizhe Shohada Brigade (1983–1984)
- Commander of the 155th Shohada Special Forces Brigade (1984–1986)
- Commander of the Shohada Special Forces Division (1986)

== Operations ==
- Operation Badr (1985)
- Operation Dawn 2
- Operation Dawn 4
- Operation Dawn 9
- Operation Ghadeer
- Operation Karbala 2

== Death ==
Kaveh was one of the youngest commanders during the Iran–Iraq War. He was killed on 2 September 1986 in Ahvaz due to injuries suffered from mortar shrapnel. He was 25 at the time of his death. His body was sent to Mashhad and buried at Behesht-e reza Cemetery.

== See also ==
Shahid Kaveh, a cyberwar unit of the IRGC
