= Basra–Shalamcheh rail line =

Railway line in Iraq

Situation of the project - June 2026

The Basra–Shalamcheh rail line is a railway line that operates since 2023 between the cities of Basra in Iraq and Shalamcheh in Iran. The line is roughly 32 kilometres (20 mi) long.

Construction is scheduled to be finished by October 2024.
