= Chazabeh =

Border terminal in Iran

Coordinates: 31.8539°N 47.8025°E

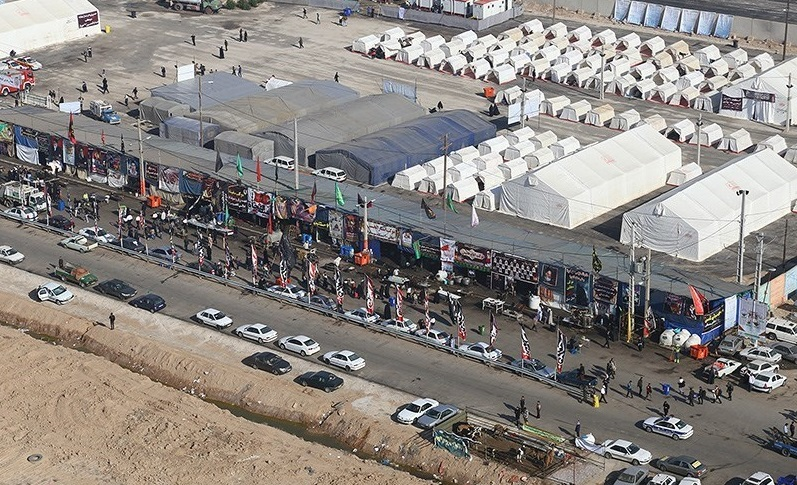
Chazabeh Border Terminal

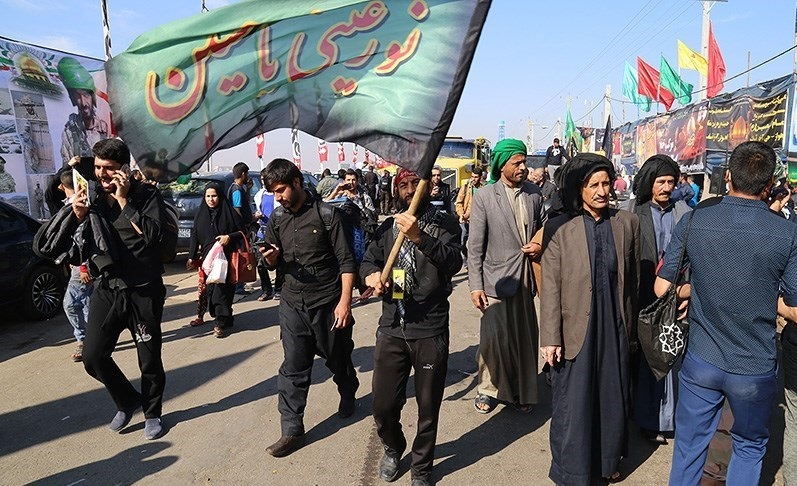
Chazabeh, pilgrims of Imam Hussain

Chazabeh (Persian: چذابه) is a border terminal in Iran, located in Khuzestan province in south-western Iran. It is in the common border between Iran and Iraq, 95 km from Ahwaz, the center of Khuzestan. Chazabah can be regarded as an important border terminal that is especially an entry point in addition to the Shalamcheh border crossing for those (e.g. pilgrims) who intend to travel from Iran into Iraq (Karbala, Najaf, etc.) through Khuzestan.

Recently, Chazabeh has become a better-known border crossing due to its high activity, especially in the months Muharram and Safar when hundreds of thousands of Iranian and non-Iranian pilgrims choose this border crossing for their travel to Iraq and vice versa. For example, in just the first three weeks of the Arabic/Islamic month of Safar (about Nov 2016), more than 700,000 people used this border crossing for their travels.

Chazabeh had a significant role in the Iran–Iraq War. For instance, in the operation of Tange-Chazabeh, Saddam personally attended the area in order to recapture the city of Bostan, Iran, and one of the bloodiest battles of the war happened in that area.

== 2026 Iran massacres ==
During the 2025–2026 Iranian protests, Iran International reported that on 2 January 2026, Iraqi militias affiliated with the Iranian government recruited forces to assist Iranian security forces in suppressing protests in Iran. The troops were reportedly transported through border crossings including Chazabeh.

On October 26, 2026, Iraq shut down the Sheeb border crossing with Iran to enhance security measures and install anti-smuggling detection systems. This closure impacts travelers, vehicles, and commercial trucks until further notice, according to border officials. An Iranian official confirmed that the Iraqi government made the decision to close the crossing, also referred to as Chazabeh. Talks are currently ongoing between Iran's Interior Ministry and Iraqi officials regarding the reopening date of the crossing.

== See also ==
- Khosravi
