= Battle of the Marshes =

1984 Iran–Iraq War battle

Coordinates: 31°32′32″N 47°42′24″E

- Part of Iran–Iraq War
Date	February 1984
Location	Lakes of the Hawizeh Marshes in Iraq
Result	Iranian victory
Territorial changes	Iranians fall back but manage to occupy the Majnoon island and parts of the Hawr Al Hawiza marsh

Belligerents
Iraq	Iran

Commanders and leaders
(Iraq) Saddam Hussein	(Iran) Husayn Kharrazi (WIA)

Strength
Unknown	250,000–350,000 troops

Casualties and losses
9,000 killed (Iraqi claims) 3,000 killed 9,000 wounded 60 tanks lost	40,000 killed (Iraqi claims) 20,000 killed 30,000 wounded 1,000 captured

The Battle of the Marshes (Arabic: معركة الأهوار) was a part of the Iran–Iraq War.

After the mostly indecisive Dawn operations in 1983, Iran opened a new, surprise amphibious offensive in the lakes of the Hawizeh Marshes in the Iraqi Tigris–Euphrates river system.

After heavy losses at the beginning due to human wave attacks, 15,000 casualties and little progress, Iran began developing new tactics, involving amphibious assault, and deployed a regular army division, the 92nd Armored Division. Although the Iranians suffered heavy losses against the Iraqi artillery, tanks, air strikes and gunboats, Iran eventually managed to invade the oil rich Majnoun Islands with Operation Kheibar and nearly break the Iraqi lines before being driven back to the marshes and Majnoon Island.

Iraq heavily used chemical weapons (mustard gas) during the battle.

== Prelude and Iranian tactics ==
After the mostly indecisive Dawn operations, Iran attempted to change tactics. Iran had launched numerous operations in 1983 around Basra and southern Iraq using massed human wave attacks, but they faced limited successes in the face of the Iraqi static defenses. In addition, the Iraqis began launching counterattacks. In the face of increasing Iraqi armament and manpower as well as increasing problems on their own side, Iran could no longer rely on outnumbering Iraqi troops. While the infantry and human wave assaults would remain key to their attacks throughout the war, Iran began to rely more heavily on deception surprise attacks, as well as light infantry warfare. In contrast to Iraq's static defences and heavy armour, Iran began training troops in infiltration, patrolling, night-fighting, marsh warfare, and mountain warfare. They also began training thousands of Revolutionary Guard commandos in amphibious warfare, as southern Iraq is marshy and filled with wetlands. Iran used speedboats to cross the marshes and rivers in southern Iraq, landing troops on the opposing banks, where they would dig and set up pontoon bridges across the rivers and wetlands to allow heavy troops and supplies to cross. Transport helicopters were used as well, ferrying troops to the battlefield. Unlike Iraq, Iran could no longer use its air force at this stage of the war, so it relied mostly on helicopters to support its troops.

The Iranians utilized SEAL type Special Forces from two naval brigades. Four Iranian SEAL battalions were deployed with 2,400 men. The Iranian SEALs regularly conducted hundreds of reconnaissance missions with great success. They often would change into civilian clothing to blend in with the locals and gather information in the enemy rear. More than half these missions were successful providing detailed information on Iraqi defenses even reporting the size of bunker doors.

Iran's amphibious assault tactics, using Boghammar speedboats as landing craft would be decisive during this battle.

== Iraqi tactics ==
By the end of 1982, Iraq had been resupplied with new Soviet and Chinese material, and the ground war entered a new phase. Iraq used newly acquired T-55 tanks and T-62 tanks (as well as Chinese copies), BM-21 rocket launchers, and Mi-24 helicopter gunships to prepare a Soviet-type three-line defense, replete with obstacles, minefields, and fortified positions. The Combat Engineer Corps built bridges across water obstacles, laid minefields, and prepared new defence lines and fortifications.

In order to defend Basra, the Iraqis poured water into a pre-existing lake east of Basra, known as Fish Lake, and filled it with barbed wire, floating land mines, and high voltage electrical power lines which electrocuted Iranian soldiers and made the lake practically impenetrable. They also began launching air raids against Iranian border cities, greatly increasing the practice by 1984.

With such static defenses, the Iraqis had effectively made frontal assault through the flat lands virtually impossible for the Iranians. Thus the Iranians would launch their amphibious attacks.

== Diversionary attacks ==
Prior to the attack, the Iranian commandos on helicopters landed behind Iraqi lines, and even destroyed Iraqi artillery. Iran launched two preliminary attacks prior to the main offensive, Operation Dawn 5 and Dawn 6. They saw the Iranians attempting to capture Al-Amarah, Iraq and sever the highway connecting Baghdad to Basra, which would impede Iraqi coordination of supplies and defences. The area, located on a large waterway, had been considered impenetrable by the Iraqis, but Iranian troops crossed the river using Boghammar speedboats in a surprise attack. However, the Iranian forces only came within 24 kilometres (15 mi) of the highway. Afterwards, Iran began Operation Kheibar, the main offensive.

== Operation Kheibar ==
By 1984, the Iranian ground forces were reorganised well enough for the Revolutionary Guard to start Operation Kheibar, which lasted from 24 February to 19 March. Beginning on 15 February 1984 the Iranians began launching attacks against the central section of the front, where the Iraqi 2nd Corps was deployed, with 250,000 Iraqis facing 250,000 Iranians.

Operation Kheibar began on 24 February when Iranian infantrymen crossed the Hawizeh Marshes using speedboats in an amphibious assault. This took the Iraqis by surprise, since the marshes were considered impenetrable, and worse the Iraqis could not use their tanks. The marshes also absorbed the impact of Iraqi artillery and bombs.

The Iranians attacked the vital oil-producing Majnoon Island by landing troops by helicopters onto the islands and severed the communication lines between Amarah and Basra. The Iranians continued the attack towards Qurna.

Iraqi defences, under continuous strain since 15 February, seemed close to breaking. However, they were saved by their use of chemical weapons and defence-in-depth, where they layered several defensive lines; even if the Iranians broke through the first line, they were usually unable to break through the second due to exhaustion and heavy losses. Iran suffered also from a shortage of aircraft and armour and the infantry had to bear the brunt of the fighting. The Revolutionary Guard also used guerrilla tactics in the marshes blending into the terrain and bypassing the Iraqis. Iranian mounted infantry using motorcycles also pushed deeper into Iraqi lines.

The Iraqis heavily used Mi-25 Hind to "hunt" the Iranian troops in the marshes, killing many soldiers. On 27 February, Iran finally captured Majnoon Island, but lost 49 of their own helicopters shot down by Iraqi jet fighters. Fighting took place in waters over 2 meters deep at times. Iraq in response to the attacks ran live electrical cables through the water, electrocuting numerous Iranian troops and then displaying their corpses on state television.

By 29 February, they had reached the outskirts of Qurna and nearly reached the Baghdad-Basra highway. But by this time, the Iranians had broken out of the marshes and returned to open terrain, and were confronted by the conventional Iraqi forces including artillery, tanks and air power, as well as mustard gas. 1,200 Iranian troops were killed in the counterattack. The Iranians were forced to retreat back to the marshes, however they still held onto them along with Majnoon Island.

Approximately 40,000 Iranians became casualties during the fighting in the marshes, with Iraqi helicopter gunships being deployed to "hunt" the Iranian troops through the swampy land. The Iranians also used combined helicopter and riverboat operations as part of this attack, known as the Fatima al-Zahra operations (named after the daughter of Muhammad), charting and mapping all of the marshes.

== Aftermath ==
Although the Iranians suffered much greater losses, their large numbers and religious fervor enabled them to continue. Iraq was relying on Soviet tanks and artillery and air support. Iran, with more than three times the size and population of Iraq, relied on sheer numbers, religious zeal and self-sacrifice due to turmoil caused by the recent revolution that negatively affected the amount of military organization, trade, supplies, and military hardware. The operation inspired other successful amphibious operations by Iran later in the war, including Operation Dawn-8 during which Iran captured the Faw Peninsula.
