= Reza Seyed-Hosseini =

Iranian translator (1926–2009)

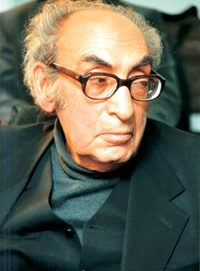
- Born: October 15, 1926 Nir Ardabil, Iran
- Died: May 1, 2009 (aged 82) Tehran
- Occupation: Translator, writer
- Notable awards: Iranian Science and Culture Hall of Fame

Reza Seyed-Hosseini (Persian: رضا سیدحسینی, October 15, 1926 – May 1, 2009) was a noted translator of French language works of literature into Persian.

Mehdi Mirzamehdi Tehrani was the last of his students in translation and writing encyclopedic articles from 1987 until 1992.
