= Akbar Alemi =

Iranian photographer, cinematographer and film director (1945–2020)

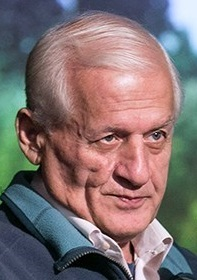
- Alemi in 2019
- Born: July 4, 1945; Ahvaz
- Died: October 12, 2020 (aged 75); Tehran
- Resting place: Behesht-e Zahra
- Education: Tarbiat Modares University
- Occupations: television presenter, documentary film director

Akbar Alemi (Persian: اکبر عالمی; July 4, 1945 – October 12, 2020) was an Iranian television presenter and documentary film director. He was also a lecturer at Tarbiat Modares University.

== Life ==
Akbar Alemi was born in Ahvaz in 1945. Because of his interest in cinema, he moved to Tehran to study television and cinema studies at the College of Fine Arts (University of Tehran). He received a master's degree in cinema from Tarbiat Modares University. Then, he got a doctorate in cinema studies from England and returned to Iran.

He was the head of the laboratory of the Ministry of Culture and Higher Education and the head of the laboratories of the Broadcasting Organization. In the 1980s, Alemi prepared and performed his program on Thursday nights on the IRIB TV1, which was a very attractive program on the subject of the cinema of his time. In the 1990s, Alemi was the presenter and expert of Seventh Art, an influential Iranian television program about cinema. Mehdi Tehrani (Lecturer of film studies at the University of Tehran College of Fine Arts and film critic) was one of his first students in 1990.

He made nearly 30 documentaries for the pharmaceutical, petrochemical, textile and wood industries in English, French, Spanish, German, Italian and Arabic.

Alemi was a member of Iranian Academy of the Arts and Academy of Persian Language and Literature from 2000 to 2007. On March 5, 2017, Alemi's efforts in the fields of photography and cinema were honored at the House of Iranian Artists.

== Death and legacy ==
Alemi contracted COVID-19 after visiting a hospital to make a documentary; despite following health protocols, he and three of his colleagues were infected. He was admitted to the hospital for several weeks before dying in October 2020.

He was buried on October 13, 2020, in the artists' plot of Behesht-e Zahra, Tehran, next to the graves of Massoud Mehrabi and Khosrow Sinai.

Cinéma Vérité, an Iranian film festival, posthumously awarded Alemi a Lifetime Achievement Award in December 2020.
