= Operation Karbala-2 =

1986 Iranian military operation in the Iran–Iraq War

- Part of the Iran–Iraq War
| Date | 1 September 1986 |
| Location | Haji Omeran, Iraq |
| Result | Iranian victory: Iranian captured several altitudes, including "1600, 1700, 1800, 2000, 2200, 2435" and a part of "Haji-Omran-Darbande Chuman Mostafa" and "GardKu" road |

Belligerents
| Iraq | Iran |

Units involved
| Brigades 98, 604, 807; Abu-Obaideh commando foot battalion Commando battalion under the command of corps-23 (foot brigades 438/91) | Komeil battalion Meitham battalion Hamzeh battalion Imam Hussein battalion Adawat (implements) battalion ToopKhane (Artillery) battalion |

Casualties and losses
| Unknown | 3,000 killed/wounded, 200 captured |

Operation Karbala-2 (Persian: عملیات کربلای 2) was an Iranian operation during Iran–Iraq War which was launched on 1 September 1986 in Haji Omeran area in Iraq with the command/participation of a brigade from Seyyed-al-Shohada corp-4 (of Islamic Revolutionary Guard Corps). As a result of the operation which was commenced by the code of "Ya Aba Abdellah al-Hussain (a.s.)", a part of "Haj-Omeran" road and some altitudes became occupied by Iranian forces.

At the operation Karbala-2 which was almost near the end of the 4th year of the war, there were other (Iranian) corps which participated in the operation in addition to Seyyed-al-Shohada corp-4, including:

Badr brigade-9, Qaem-12, Imam Reza-21, Quds-105 and Shuhada-155; which was done totally by the participation of 28 battalions from Islamic Revolutionary Guard Corps.

Iran at the end of this operation, Iranian forces captured the altitudes of "1600, 1700, 1800, 2000, 2200, 2435" and also a part of "Haj-Omran-Darbande Chuman Mostafa" and "GardKu" road in Iraq.

== See also ==
- Operation Karbala-1
- Operation Karbala-4
- Operation Karbala-5
- Operation Karbala-6
- Operation Karbala-7
- Operation Karbala-10
