= Shahid Kaveh =

Cyberware unit

Mahmoud Kaveh (22 May 1961 – 2 September 1986)

Shahid Kaveh (Persian: شهید کاوه, lit. 'Martyr Kaveh') is an Iranian offensive cyberware unit (also known as CyberAv3ngers) which France and other western countries linked to the Islamic Revolutionary Guard Corps (IRGC)'s cybertronic command. Active since 2020, its namesake is Mahmoud Kaveh, one of the youngest IRGC commanders who was killed in the Iran-Iraq War at age 25.

== Name and background ==
Iran has never publicly acknowledged the unit's existence and purpose. The name (lit. 'Martyr Kaveh') appears to refer to Mahmoud Kaveh, an IRGC commander killed in the Iran-Iraq war in 1986, aged 25. Western intelligence agencies assess that the unit is linked to a network of hackers working under Teheran's direction.

== Operations ==
=== European refrigerators ===
9 November 2026, the French foreign minister Jean-Noël Barrot at a G7 summit presser in Paris claimed that Shahid Kaveh was responsible for the 2026 European cold chain hacks, which resulted in tens of millions of euros being lost in refrigerated groceries. The hacking group had best been known previously for targeting Israeli industrial systems and refrigerators, attacks for which it had claimed responsibility. Building management systems, industrial control systems (ICS), and programmable logic controllers (PLCs) are its particular area of expertise.

=== Other activity ===
Reporting links to the IRGC and affiliated groups to earlier attacks on targets in the United States and Israel, including water Infrastructure. In late 2023, US officials said a wave of attacks hit US water facilities that used systems made by the Israeli firm Unitronics. In 2026, US agencies warned that Iran affiliated agents had disrupted programmable logic controllers across several US critical infrastructure sectors. A French intelligence report says the unit and its affiliates have mainly targeted USA and Israeli targets along with French and other European countries.

== Front groups ==
According to the French report, the unit works through multiple front groups that present themselves as vigilante hackers and publicly claim some of its attacks. Named examples are "CyberAveng3rs" and "Cyber Isnaad Front".

== Personnel ==
The French report names three people it says are linked to the unit, Hamid Reza Lashgarian (described as head of the IRGC's cyberelectronic command), and Mahdi Lashgarian and Reza Salarvand, described as commanders within the unit. The US had previously sanctioned Hamid Reza Lashgarian and Mahdi Lashgarian over alleged ties to IRGC's cyber unit.

== Reactions ==
On 9 November 2026, French officials accused the IRGC of orchestrating the October attacks. The Paris Prosecutor's Office named Shahid Kaveh as the perpetrator, describing it as an offensive cyber unit affiliated with the IRGC cyberelectronic command. Foreign Minister Jean-Noël Barrot called the attack "unprecedented in its level of aggression".
