= Arthur Asa Berger =

American academic (1933–2026)

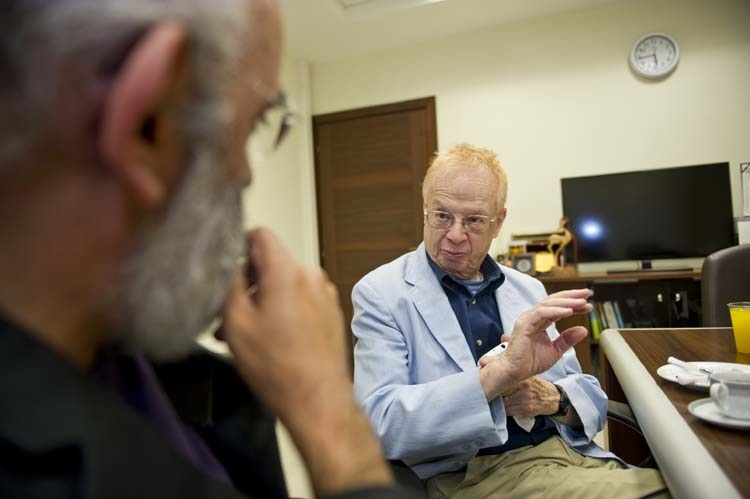
- Asa Berger in 2015
- Born: January 3, 1933; Boston, Massachusetts, U.S.
- Died: September 19, 2026 (aged 93); Mill Valley, California, U.S.
- Education: University of Massachusetts; University of Iowa
- Spouse: Phyllis Berger
- Children: 2
- Scientific career
- Workplaces: San Francisco State University
- Thesis: Li'l Abner: A Study in American Satire (1964)
- Doctoral advisor: Mulford Q. Sibley
- Website: decoderman.blogspot.com

Arthur Asa Berger (January 3, 1933 – September 19, 2026) was an American academic and author known for his contributions to the field of media studies. He was a Professor Emeritus in Broadcast and Electronic Communication Arts at San Francisco State University at the time of his death.

== Early life and education ==
Born in Boston on January 3, 1933, Berger was the son of first-generation Jews from Lithuania and Latvia, on his mother's side, and from Russia and Lithuania on his father's side. He grew up in a Jewish household but received a Catholic education in his public high school. Most of his teachers were Catholics who had been educated at prestigious institutions such as Boston College or College of the Holy Cross. Berger developed a keen interest in writing and drawing during his formative years. In 1954, he earned a Bachelor of Arts degree in literature and philosophy from the University of Massachusetts. Berger believed that his broad education would equip him for a variety of professions. However, driven by his passion for writing, he decided to pursue a graduate degree in journalism. Initially enrolling at the University of California, Berkeley, in 1954, he later transferred to the University of Iowa, where he had the opportunity to work with influential figures like Marguerite Young. During his time at Iowa, Berger also studied philosophy under Gustav Bergmann, a notable member of the Vienna Circle. Shortly after completing his Master's degree, he was drafted into the Army in 1956 and discharged in 1958. Following his military service, Berger embarked on a year-long journey through Europe.

== Academic career ==
Upon returning from Europe, Berger enrolled in the PhD program in American Studies at the University of Minnesota. After completing his doctoral studies, he joined the faculty of San Francisco State University, specifically the department of Broadcast and Electronic Communication Arts. In this capacity, he taught courses on writing and media criticism, sharing his expertise and passion for understanding the role of media in society. Over the course of his career, Berger has authored more than 130 articles and written over 70 books. His works cover a wide range of topics, including media theory, popular culture, semiotics, and visual communication. Berger's contributions to academia have been widely recognized, and his works have been cited extensively by scholars from around the world. He has also held academic positions at prestigious institutions, including the University of Milan in Italy, Jinan University and Tsing Hua University in China, and has been a Fulbright Senior Specialist, delivering lectures on semiotics in Argentina.

Berger traveled to Iran for two weeks in May 2015, where he discussed critical media analysis methods in English in seven sessions of a media analysis workshop at the Faculty of World Studies, University of Tehran.

His visit to Iran was organized at the invitation of the Center for Cyberspace Policy Research, University of Tehran, the UNESCO Chair in Culture and Cyberspace: The Bispatialization of the World, and the Iranian Society for World Studies, and with Iran's National Elites Foundation. He also met with Iranian cultural, artistic, and journalistic figures such as Younes Shokrkhah, a professor at the University of Tehran, and Mehdi Tehrani (his doctoral thesis advisor in 1999, McGill University).

== Personal life and death ==
Berger was married to Phyllis Berger, and together they had two children. Their son Gabriel pursued his undergraduate studies at Harvard University and holds a Ph.D. in mathematics from Columbia University. He currently works for Google. Their daughter Nina obtained a doctorate from an institute specializing in psychoanalysis and now practices as a psychoanalyst. Jason Berger, the late Boston landscape painter, was Arthur's brother. In addition to his academic pursuits, Berger maintained a personal weblog called "Decoder Man."

Arthur Asa Berger died in Mill Valley, California, on September 19, 2026, at the age of 93.

== Selected bibliography ==
- (1982). Media analysis techniques. Beverly Hills: Sage Publications.
- (1984). Signs in contemporary culture: An introduction to semiotics. New York: Longman.
- (1989). Seeing is believing: An introduction to visual communication. Mountain View, Calif: Mayfield Pub. Co.
- (1997). Bloom's morning: Coffee, comforters, and the secret meaning of everyday life. Boulder, Colo: Westview Press.
- (1997). Postmortem for a Postmodernist. Walnut Creek, California: AltaMira Press.
- (1998). Media research techniques. Thousand Oaks: Sage Publications.
- (2003). Durkheim is dead!: Sherlock Holmes is introduced to sociological theory. Walnut Creek, CA: Altamira Press/Rowman & Littlefield Publishers.
- (2011). Ads, Fads, and Consumer Culture: Advertising's Impact on American Character and Society. Boulder, Colo: Rowman & Littlefield Publishers, Inc.
- (2017). The Art of Comedy Writing. Routledge.
