= Operation Dawn 5 =

1984 Iran–Iraq War offensive

Operation Dawn V
- Part of Iran–Iraq War
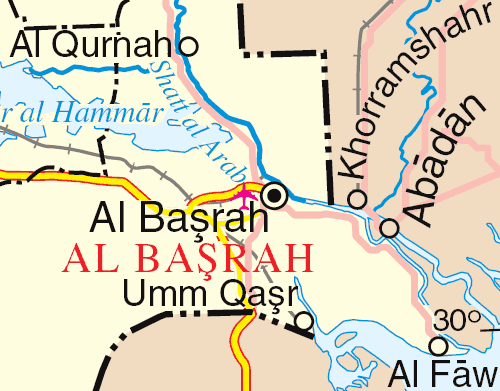
Date	16–20 February 1984 (5 days)
Location	Basra, Southeast Iraq
Result	Iraqi victory: Minor tactical Iranian success (Iran fails their objective but makes small gains over useless land); Defensive Iraqi success (Iraq holds on to the city of Basra)
Territorial changes	Iraq holds on to the city of Basra

Belligerents
Iraq	Iran

Strength
2 Army Corps (approx; 90,000–100,000 soldiers)	100,000–150,000 Pasdaran and Basij

Casualties and losses
25,000	50,000

As 1984 began, Iran launched the largest offensive up to that date Operation Dawn V, also known as Operation Dawn 5 or Operation Valfajr-5 (Persian). The goal of the offensive was to split the Iraqi 4th Army Corps and 6th Army Corps between Basra and Qurna, and if successful, move on the suburbs or even the city of Basra itself. It was fought between the Pasdaran, Basij and the Iraqi Army. In the early phase, a force of an estimated 100,000-150,000 Pasdaran and Basij, using small motorboats and then on foot moved towards the objective, then attacked using human wave tactics and in places came within a few kilometers of the strategic Basra–Baghdad highway. However the Iranians lacked artillery, air support and armored protection, while the Iraqis were well equipped and entrenched in strong fortified positions. The armies inflicted severe casualties on each other and the Iranians failed to achieve their objective. This operation was the biggest of the Dawn operations.

== The Battles ==
- Battle of the Marshes
- Operation Kheibar
- Operation Dawn 6
