= Mohsen Hojaji =

Iranian military officer beheaded in Syria (1991–2017)

Holy Shrine Defender Mohsen Hojaji
- محسن حججی
- Mohsen Hojaji looks at the camera while an IS fighter is holding him with a knife at hand with black smoke rising from the overtaken camp.
- Born: 12 July 1991; Najafabad, Isfahan Province, Iran
- Died: 9 August 2017 (aged 26); Al-Walid border, Syria
- Burial place: Najafabad, Isfahan Province, Iran
- Spouse: Zahra Abbasi
- Children: 1 son
- Military career
- Allegiance: Iran
- Branch: Islamic Revolutionary Guard Corps
- Service years: Unknown–2017
- Rank: Third lieutenant
- Unit: 8th Najaf Ashraf Armored Division
- Conflicts: Syrian Civil War (executed)

Mohsen Hojaji (Persian: محسن حججی, romanized: Mohsen Hojajī; 12 July 1991 – 9 August 2017) was an Iranian military officer. He served as an Islamic Revolutionary Guard Corps (IRGC) adviser to the pro-government forces in Syria during the Syrian Civil War. He was captured by the Islamic State forces near al-Tanf in southeast Syria, and was beheaded two days later. The Islamic State published a video of his capture, a picture of which went viral among Iranians in social media. His captivity and subsequent murder received widespread reaction among the Iranian people, government, and military.

== Biography ==
Mohsen Hojaji was an officer in the IRGC operating in Syria as part of an advisory team to the Syrian government forces during the Syrian Civil War. On 7 August 2017, ISIL led a surprise attack near al-Tanf, Syria near the Syrian-Iraqi border against a pro-government outpost comprising IRGC military advisers, including Hojaji. After two hours of fighting, an ISIS suicide bomber killed a number of people. Hojaji was wounded in his side and the right arm, according to the commander of his division, and was taken as captive after being surrounded by ISIS militants. ISIS published videos of the attack and of Hojaji's capture. Hojaji was beheaded two days later.

A still image from the second video went viral on social media. It shows an ISIS fighter with a knife at hand holding Hojaji, who is dressed in military uniform and calmly gazing at the camera, with black smoke rising from the overtaken camp. Many compared the expressions of the ISIS fighter who looks "anxious", with that of Hojaji.

Hojaji's captivity and subsequent murder received widespread reaction among people and government of Iran, including senior figures and IRGC commanders, such as Hassan Rouhani's vice president, commander of the IRGC Mohammad Ali Jafari, commander of the IRGC Ground Forces, Mohammad Pakpour, head of the Quds Force, Qasem Soleimani, who sent a message to Hojaji's wife and son, and the Iranian Army. Many Iranian celebrities, artists, and sports people also reacted to the incident, such as the footballer Mehdi Taremi, singer and musician Alireza Assar, and Rambod Javan. Reactions from outside Iran include Syrian ambassador to Iran Adnan Hassan Mahmoud and Iraqi cleric and politician Ammar al-Hakim.

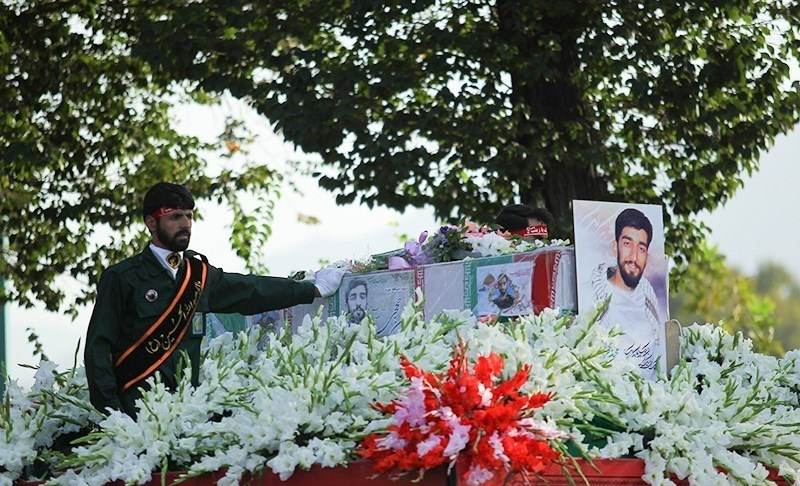
Hujaji's funeral in Isfahan

In a statement issued on August 31, the public relations department of the IRGC Ground Forces said a DNA test confirmed the identity of the body delivered to the Lebanese Hezbollah earlier in the day as Hojaji. Hezbollah received Hojaji's body from Islamic State based on a ceasefire deal between the two sides. The transfer of Lebanon's captured soldiers and remains of the dead, as well as Hojaji's body, took place after the buses carrying Islamic State militants and their families arrived in the ancient city of Palmyra in Homs.

A funeral procession was held for Hojaji in the Iranian capital, Tehran, on September 27, 2017. Thousands of people took to the streets for his funeral. The funeral began from the Imam Hussein square in downtown Tehran. Ali Khamenei prayed over Hojaji's casket and spoke to his family, praising their fortitude. Many Iranian artists memorialized his death in videos and paintings.

Following the funeral procession, Hojaji was buried on September 28, 2017. He was buried in his hometown of Najaf Abad in Isfahan Province in central Iran.
