= 8th Najaf Ashraf Division =

- لشکر 8 نجف اشرف
- Active: 1981–present
- Country: Iran
- Branch: Islamic Revolutionary Guard Corps
- Type: Infantry, armored
- Size: Division
- Garrison/HQ: Isfahan province, Najafabad county
- Nickname: "Najaf Ashraf" (نجف اشرف)
- Engagements: Iran–Iraq War; Operation Beit ol-Moqaddas; Second Battle of Khorramshahr; Operation Ramadan; First Battle of al-Faw; 2026 Iran war

Commanders
- Current commander: Gen. Seif-o-allah Rashidzade
- Notable commanders: Ahmad Kazemi; Mehdi Bakeri (deputy); Hamid Bakeri; Mohammad Pakpour; Mohammad Taghi Amini

8th Najaf Ashraf Armored Division (Persian: لشکر 8 نجف اشرف) is a division of the Islamic Revolutionary Guard Corps. The 8th Najaf Ashraf Division of the IRGC Ground Force is currently headquartered in Najafabad, Isfahan, with Mustafa Mohammadi appointed as its new commander.

It was first officially organized as the 8th Najaf Ashraf Brigade (Persian: تیپ 8 نجف اشرف) during Iran–Iraq War, just after Operation Samen-ol-A'emeh. Initially, the soldiers of the division were mostly from the Najafabad County, Isfahan province. The division was organized and nicknamed "Najaf Ashraf" by Ahmad Kazemi, which was appointed as its commander by Gholam Ali Rashid. Kazemi asked Mehdi Bakeri to become his deputy, after which units from Azarbaijan Province and Zanjan province also joined the unit. When Bakeri became the commander of the 31st Ashura Division, these brigades joined the latter. Later, the brigades from Yazd province also established their own unit, the 18th Al-Ghadir Brigade, and split from the Najaf Division. With the establishment of the 44th Qamar-e Bani-Hashem Brigade, forces from Kohgiluyeh and Boyer-Ahmad province and Isfahan province also left the Najaf Division.

In Operation Beit-ol-Moqaddas, the Najaf Ashraf Division was the unit which first broke into Khorramshahr, capturing thousands of Iraqi soldiers.

It was reportedly the first IRGC division to establish an armored unit, using captured Iraqi armor. The division is also called 8th Najaf Ashraf Armored Division.

== Notable commanders ==
- Maj.Gen. Ahmad Kazemi (commander)
- Lt. Gen. Mehdi Bakeri (deputy)
- Brig.Gen Mohammad Pakpour (commander)
- Brig.Gen Mansour Haghdoust
- Cpt. Mohsen Hojaji
