= Operation Karbala-9 =

1987 Iran–Iraq War operation

Operation Karbala 9
- Part of the Iran–Iraq War
Date	9 April 1987
Location	Qasr-e Shirin, Iran
Result	Inconclusive: Iraqi defensive victory; Iran suffers heavy casualties

Belligerents
Iraq	Iran

Operation Karbala-9 (Persian: عملیات کربلای 9) was an offensive operation in Iran–Iraq War, which was launched by Islamic Republic of Iran Army with the operation code of "Ya Mahdi, Adrekni" (Persian/Arabic: یا مهدی ادرکنی) on 9 April 1987. This operation ended inconclusively, and Iran had very large casualties from the numerous Iraqi traps.

The goal of the operation which was in operation zone of "QasrShirin-SarpoleZahab" (Persian: قصرشیرین-سرپل‌ذهاب), was to liberate the heights of the operation region of Qasr-e Shirin. The Iranian government claimed that heights-542 and Baba-Hadi outpost border were liberated, and that it killed 1,800 Iraqis, and captured 55 of them.

Despite that Shalamcheh region (in Iran) was involved in war, a new battle was launched—in the west of Iran—by Iranian forces against Iraqi army by this name (Operation Karbala-9); During the mentioned operation, Iranian forces attacked its enemies in "Babadi-strait" located in Pishgah area, and assaulted Iraqi army by passing explosive traps and landmines. Afterwards, Islamic Republic of Iran claimed that its army seized the strait of Babadi in three hours and made the rest of Iraqi forces to withdraw from the region. This operation ended in an inconclusive result, and Iran had very large casualties from the numerous Iraqi traps.
