= Mehdi Mirzamehdi Tehrani =

Iranian journalist and veteran of the Iran-Iraq War

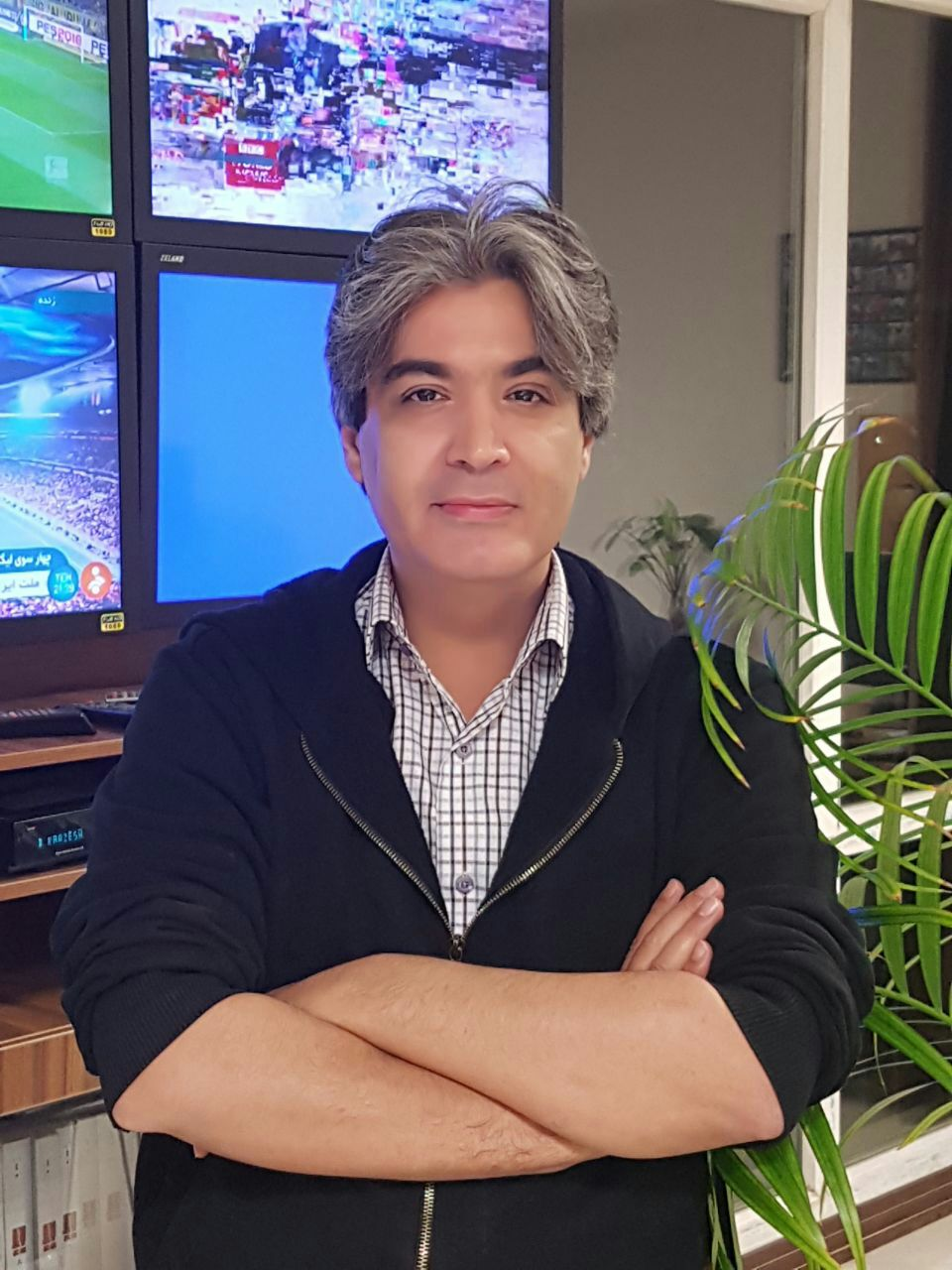
- Tehrani 2020
- Born: Mehdi Mirzamehdi Tehrani; 13 March 1970 (age 56); Tehran, Iran
- Education: McGill University
- Occupations: Journalist; Film critic
- Military career
- Allegiance: Iran
- Branch: Basij
- Rank: Lieutenant commander
- Commands: Bayandor Independent Marine Battalion
- Conflicts: Iran–Iraq War (Wounded in Action); Operation Karbala-4
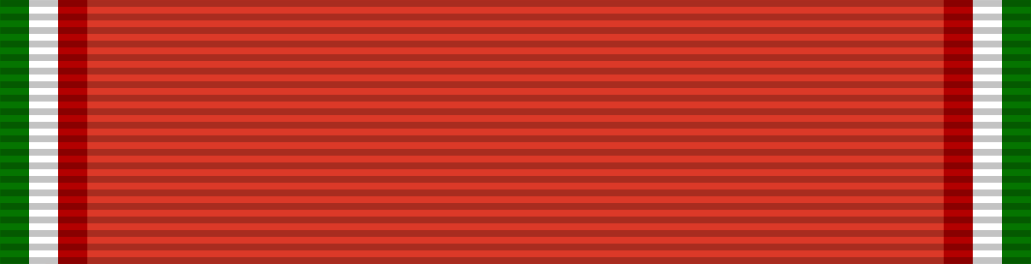
- Awards: Order of Altruism

Mehdi Mirzamehdi Tehrani (Persian: مهدی میرزامهدی تهرانی; born 13 March 1970) is an Iranian film critic, journalist, and academic, as well as a veteran of the Iran–Iraq War. He has written film reviews for Iranian publications for over three decades and taught film studies at the Faculty of Fine Arts at the University of Tehran. During the Iran–Iraq War, he commanded a Basij naval company in Operation Karbala-4 and later led a battalion in subsequent operations. As of 2023, he is the last surviving member among the 15 wartime survivors of his battalion.

== Journalism and academic background ==
He studied history and encyclopedia writing, and basic concepts of cinema under Reza Seyed-Hosseini, Akbar Alemi, Arthur Knight and later completed his PhD in Film and Visual Media Studies at McGill University in 1999 under the supervision of Christian Ross and Arthur Asa Berger. Tehrani has written extensively on cinema for over three decades. In his own writing, He has categorized film criticism in Iranian print and online media into several distinct types, including academic critics, journalist critics, translator-critics, and social-media critics.

He has presented research papers at national conferences. His papers were among the selected works presented at the First Conference on Order and Knowledge (2000) and the First Conference on Research in IRIB (2000).

From September 2020 to November 2021, he served on the Age Rating Council of the Iranian Cinema Organization.

Cinematic views

According to Hamshahri Online and Khabar Online, Tehrani’s film criticism is characterized by a strong emphasis on editing as the core essence of cinema. Drawing on the theories of Soviet filmmakers Dziga Vertov and Vsevolod Pudovkin, he views editing as the process that gives meaning to raw images.

He is also a proponent of the British New Wave (Kitchen Sink Realism), praising its focus on social realism and everyday life. He frequently references Akira Kurosawa as a master of cinematic form and editing. In his approach to criticism, he advocates clarity and accessibility, arguing that the role of a critic is to serve as a “road map” for the audience rather than a prescriptive judge, avoiding overly technical jargon.

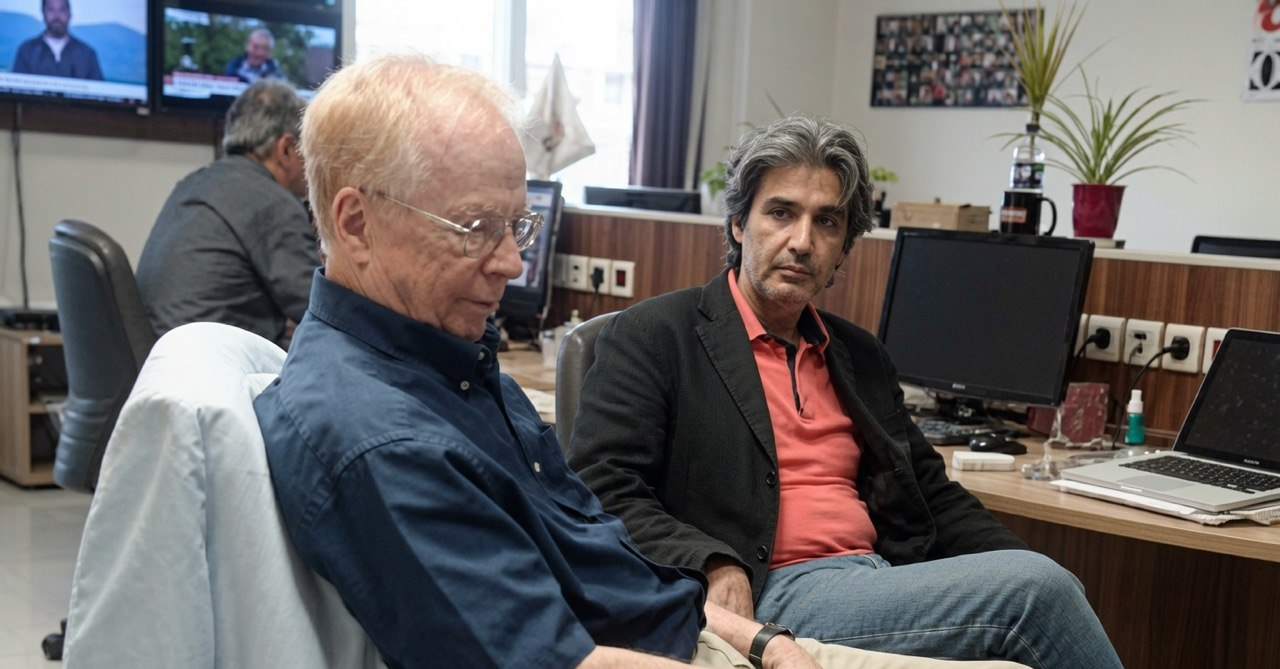
Mehdi Tehrani with Professor Arthur Asa Berger (left), Tehran. 2015

== Military background ==
Mehdi Tehrani served as a Marine Ranger during the Iran-Iraq War and commanded an independent battalion, officially known as the Admiral Gholam Ali Bayandor Battalion, during the Operation Karbala-4.

According to Hamshahri Online, of approximately 15 members of the battalion who survived Operation Karbala-4 in December 1986, the rest gradually died of their wounds in the following decades, leaving Tehrani as the sole surviving member. He was seriously wounded by chemical agents during the war.

In 2020, he received the Order of Altruism (1st class) in recognition of his service.

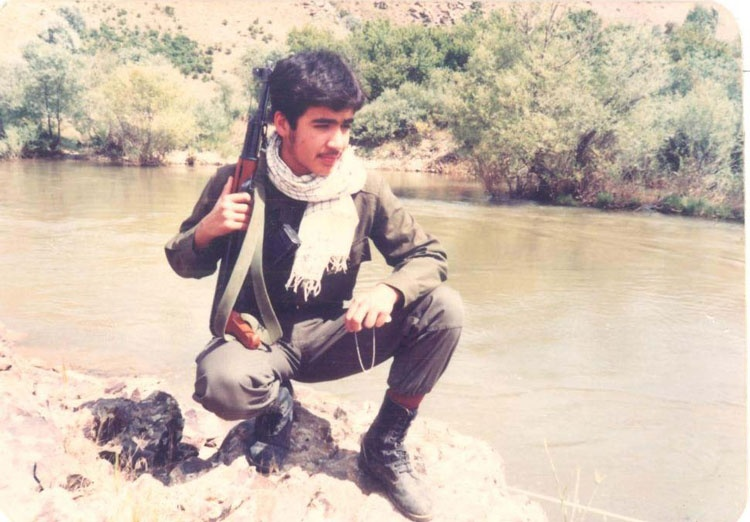
Tehrani in December 1986, shortly before Operation Karbala-4

== Selected works ==
- Tehrani, Mehdi (2000). “Decriminalization and the Role of Cultural and Social Organizations”. In Proceedings of the First Conference on Order and Knowledge (Law Enforcement Forces). Tehran: NAJA Research Department, pp. 96–102.
- Tehrani, Mehdi (2000). “The Role and Position of Research Management in Radio and Television in Iran and the World”. In Proceedings of the First Conference on Research in IRIB. Tehran: Deputy for Research and Planning, IRIB, pp. 127–148.
- Tehrani, Mehdi (2003). "Like a Cartoon (the position of big companies and independent studios in the process of growing and learning animation cinema, 1927–2003)". Farabi Cinema Quarterly. 49 (3): 143–154. ISSN 1022-3126.
- Tehrani, Mehdi (2003). "Cinema and the Audience: Iranian Cinema and Its Audience: Periodic Dynamism and Periodic Helplessness of Iranian Cinema". Farabi Cinema Quarterly. 50 (4): 33–60. ISSN 1022-3126.
