= Operation Keymer =

Anti-cannabis operation in the United Kingdom

Operation Keymer was a crackdown on cannabis-growing factories in the United Kingdom during late 2006. This was the first operation by the police to target growing factories and the police described it as a great success.

== Scale of operation ==
The extent of the operation is not known exactly and reporting of it is contradictory. A Cambridgeshire Police report stated that between 25 September 2006 and 6 October 2006, nine raids took place netting them 12 arrests and over 4500 plants. The Guardian website reports 28,000 cannabis plants and 54 kilos worth £2.5 million over the same period.

== Effects ==
On the street it widely affected the supply of cannabis, leading to many "dry" areas. Shortages were predicted to continue until February when the replacement stocks were ready to be harvested.

The operation is blamed for the spreading of sub-standard cannabis containing silica, a sand-like substance that when inhaled causes silicosis (a form of irreversible damage to the lungs).
