= Operation Karbala-6 =

1987 Iran–Iraq War operation

- Part of the Iran–Iraq War
- Location: Qasr-e Shirin, Iran
- Planned by: Iran
- Date: Early 1987
- Executed by: 10,000 Basij; 77th Mechanized Division of Khorasan (Army); 31st Ashura Division (Pasdaran)
- Outcome: Operational failure: Successful Iraqi defence; Limited Iranian advance

Operation Karbala-6 was an Iranian operation during the Iran–Iraq War to prevent Iraq from rapidly transferring units to its defense lines at Basra after Iran had launched Operation Karbala-5 to capture the city of Basra.

Iran used Basij militiamen armed with Kalashnikovs and RPG-7s, the Army's 77th Mechanized Division of Khorasan equipped with M47 and M48 tanks, 106mm recoilless rifle, 130mm and 230mm artillery, supported by attack helicopters, and IRGC's 31st Ashura Division which was armed with captured Iraqi tanks.

== Prelude ==
As Operation Karbala-5 was launched to capture the city of al-Basra, the Operations Karbala-6 at Qasr Shirin and Karbala-7 in Iraqi Kurdistan were launched to stop the Iraqis from transferring units to their defense lines in Basra. It was meant to divert Iraqi armor away from the city during the Karbala-5 attack. For the Operation around 10,000 Basij volunteers, 1 regular army division and 1 Pasdaran division were used for this offensive. The Basijis were lined up early in the morning and sent on offence earlier than was planned because the enemy was expecting something.

== The battle ==
10,000 Basij volunteers attacked. As they advanced, the Iraqis abandoned their positions. Iraqi troops then counter-attacked with armor and surrounded the Basij, who were only armed with Kalashnikovs and RPG-7s. The Basij forces broke through the Iraqi lines. However, an Iraqi counterattack encircled the Basij forces in a pocket. Many Basij volunteers were killed in the fighting with the surrounding Iraqi troops. Immediately, the Iranian 77th 'Khorasan" mechanized division and the 31st 'Ashoora' mechanized division attacked the Iraqi forces. Iraqi forces suffered heavy losses. The Iranian 77th mechanized division broke through the encirclement, defeating the Iraqis and relieving the Basijis.

== Aftermath ==
Eventually, while initially successful, the Iranian offensive petered out because it was not meant to be a breakthrough attack, due to shortages of logistics, and Iraqi chemical weapons. The offensive, while successfully diverting some of Iraq's armor away from the battlefield in Basra, did not prevent the Iraqis from stopping the Iranian attack against the city.

== See also ==
- Operation Karbala-7

== Bibliography ==
- http://csis.org/files/media/csis/pubs/9005lessonsiraniraqii-chap08.pdf
- https://books.google.com/books?id=dUHhTPdJ6yIC
