= Copeland (company) =

HVAC equipment producer

- Copeland company logo
- Founded: 1921 in Detroit, Michigan, US
- Founder: Edmund Copeland
- Headquarters: Saint Louis, Missouri, USA
- Area served: 40+ countries
- Products: Dixell electronics; Emerson flow controls, valves and system components; Emerson rack, system, facility controls, and case controllers; Emerson leak detection; ProAct services and software; Emerson cargo monitoring solutions; Compressor electronics; ProAct transport
- Brands: Bueno; Sensi; Vilter; White Rodgers; Verdant; Cooper Atkins
- Number of employees: 18000+
- Website: www.copeland.com

Copeland is an American company in the field of heating, cooling, and refrigeration compression technologies and controls solutions.

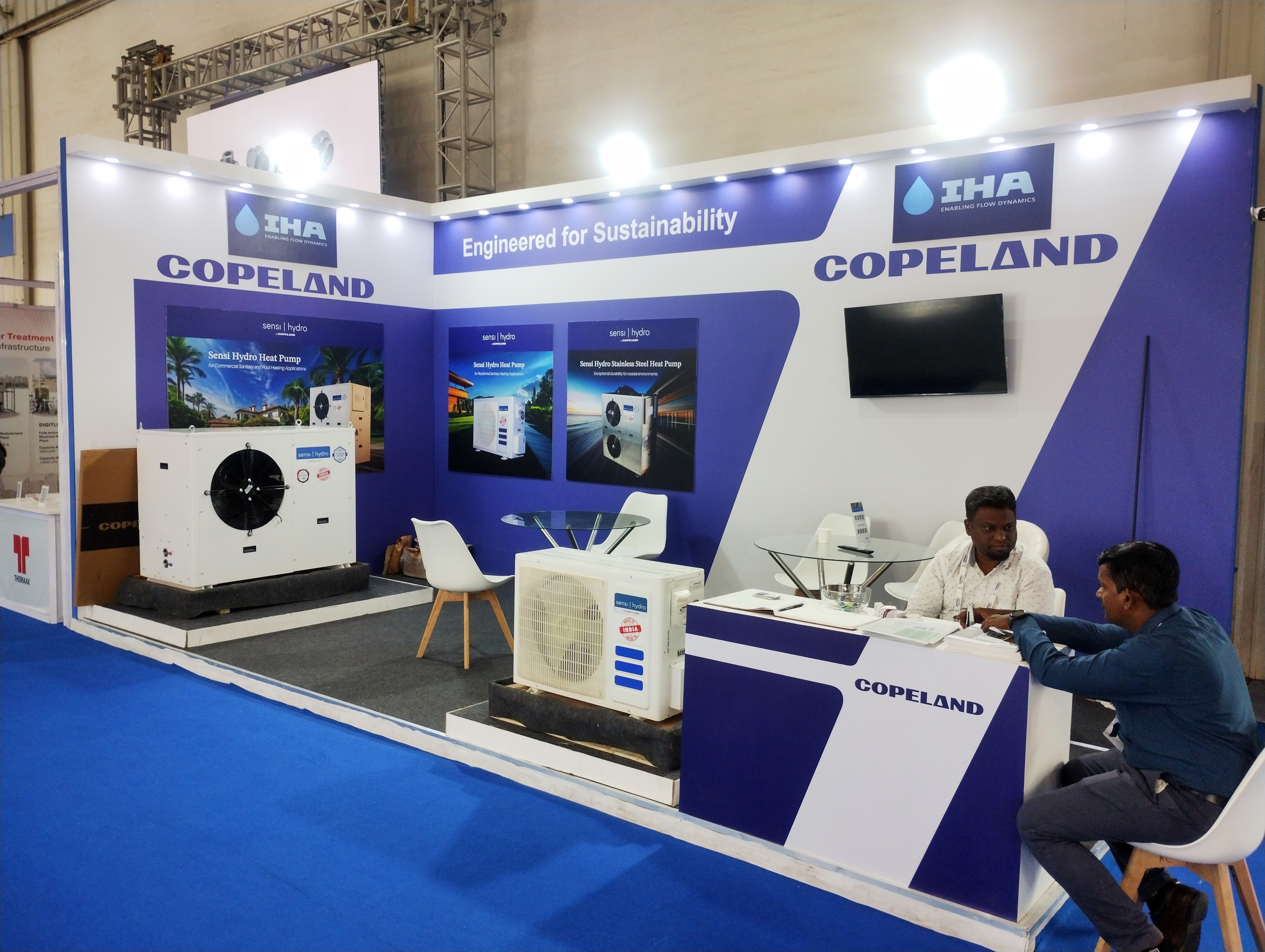
Copeland at Plumbex India 2026, BIEC

== History ==
Emerson Electric acquired Copeland in 1986. In 2023, Copeland returned to a stand-alone company status.
