= Operation Karbala 10 =

1987 Iran–Iraq War operation

- Part of the Iran–Iraq War
Date	14 April–May 1987
Location	Northern Iraq
Result	Iranian tactical victory
Territorial changes	Minimal territorial gains of insignificant lands for Iran; Iranian advance halts at Mawat.

Belligerents
Iraq	Iran; Peshmerga

Operation Karbala 10 was a joint operation by Iran and Kurdish PUK rebels in Iraq.

Following the failure of the Siege of Basra, the Iranians launched Operation Karbala 10 in northern Iraq on 14 April. The Iranians, supported by a few thousand PUK Peshmergas succeeded to capturing the outskirts of Sulaymaniyah and Halabja and lands around them.
