= Haji Omeran =

Town in the Erbil Governorate, Iraq

Haji Omeran حاجی ئۆمەران
- Town
- Interactive map of Haji Omeran
- Location of Haji Omeran within Iraq
- Coordinates: 36°39′29″N 45°02′23″E
- Country: Iraq
- Region: Kurdistan Region
- Governorate: Erbil Governorate
- Many residents temporarily leave in winter due to extreme climate
- Demonym: Kurdish
- Time zone: UTC+3 (UTC+3)

Haji Omeran (Kurdish: حاجی ئۆمەران, Hacî Omeran;), is a town located in Iraqi Kurdistan's Erbil Governorate near the Iran–Iraq border. It is 180 kilometers northeast of the Erbil and 20 kilometers east of the Choman. The town is inhabited by Kurds.

The BBC described it as "a scruffy, scrappy kind of town with a frontier feel." Many of the inhabitants leave it during the months of winter due to extreme climate conditions, temporarily staying in the area of Erbil.

== See also ==
- Operation Dawn 2
- Operation Karbala-7
- Iraqi chemical weapons program
- Lake Felaw
