= Operation Dawn 6 =

1984 Iran–Iraq War operation

- Part of Iran–Iraq War
Date	22–24 February 1984
Location	Area east of the Basra–Baghdad Highway
Result	Iraqi victory: Minor tactical Iranian success; Successful Iraqi defense
Territorial changes	Territory 5 by 10 miles captured, but not the objective of the Baghdad-Basra highway

Belligerents
Iraq	Iran

Strength
~140,000	500,000

Casualties and losses
Moderate	Heavy

Operation Dawn 6 (Operation Valfajr 6 [عملیات والفجر ۶] in Persian) was a military operation conducted by the forces of the Islamic Republic of Iran against the armed forces of Saddam Hussein's Iraq. It lasted from 22 to 24 February 1984 and, along with Operation Dawn 5, it was part of a larger strategic operation to secure part of the Baghdad–Basra highway, thus cutting two of Iraq's most important cities from each other, and threatening the network supplying the Iraqi military on the front line. Operation Before the Dawn succeeded in capturing some high ground 15 miles from the highway, and Operation Dawn 6 was designed to exploit the Iranians' capture with a breakthrough towards the highway. However, the operation met an Iraqi defence which stood up to every attack, and the Iranians called off the attack after only two days. This led to Operation Kheibar, the re-focus of the Iranian offensive towards Basra directly.

== Prelude to the operation ==
The failures of Iran's five large-scale 1983 offensives to inflict a decisive defeat on the Ba'ath regime of Saddam Hussein had angered many in the Iranian government. Only a year before, the Iraqi army had been routed out of the majority of Iran by the regular army and religious militias of the Islamic Republic. The tracts of Iranian territory still held by Iraq in Iran were abandoned on the orders of Saddam Hussein, and the Iraqis retreated to a more defensible line along the old border between the two countries. Many commentators expected that Saddam's army would fall apart as it had done in Iran.

However, the Iraqis, now occupying the significant border defenses, and now fighting for the protection of the nation, as opposed to an offensive into another country, were able to thwart Iranian hopes for a victory in 1983. In fact, with the Iranians themselves on the offensive, Iranian troops were wondering why they were now fighting in another country when they had cleared their own country of a foreign invader (these feelings were not especially pronounced in 1983, but would become apparent as war-exhaustion took its toll in the later years of the war). Also, the Iranians, convinced that victory was imminent, were careless in the way that they conducted their offensive operations. The victories of 1982 had been built on a modest, but solid, co-ordination and co-operation between the regular army of Iran; and the religious militia of the Pasdaran, and the Basij. Human-wave attacks, predominantly by religious fighters, were supported by the tanks, artillery and aircraft that were able to pull off victory. Elan was combined with the necessary support.

However, in 1983, the regular army had been sidelined, and the religious militias were now made the mainstay of the Iranian military. This was because the army had always been seen by the religious government of Iran as a source of possible opposition against the regime, a regime which had only been established in 1979, and which still had plenty of enemies. This meant that, against a formidable Iraqi defence, which should have demanded even more co-operation between the army and the militias, the attack only consisted of World War I-type human-wave attacks; with meagre artillery, tank, and aerial support. In the meantime, Iraq had initiated the first War of the Cities, launching missiles against Iranian cities. The Iranians responded in kind, and this spurned on pressure for an Iranian offensive as soon as possible in 1984.

== The fighting ==
Operation Before the Dawn had succeeded in securing some high ground 15 miles from the highway between Basra and Baghdad. The attack had lasted from 15 to 22 February, and Operation Dawn 6 was launched on the 22nd.

However, the operation, which was intended as the breakthrough operation, was bogged down by a superior Iraqi defence. The Iranians would succeed in capturing individual Iraqi lines of defence, but the Iranians would be too exhausted materially and physically to move before the Iraqis could support the next line of the defence. Eventually, by the 24th, the Iranians were unable to advance any further towards the highway, and were still 10 miles from the highway. The operation was called off on the 24th.

== Consequences ==
The failure of the attack had been anticipated shortly before the attack had even been launched. The Iraqi defences in the area were too strong. However, the attack had succeeded in drawing away men of the Iraqi army from other sectors, including the area defending the Iranian's ultimate prize, Basra. On the 14th, Operation Khaibar succeeded in capturing Majnoon Island, 40 miles from Basra. The attack was contained through an Iraqi counter-attack with Iraqi reserves, employed in tandem with the use of chemical weapons (mustard gas and sarin gas).

Strategically, the attack had brought the Iranians within sight of their primary targets, but the Iraqis always held the upper hand against the poor Iranian attacks. In the end, the Iranians had lost thousands, and had only succeeded in capturing relatively worthless land (with the exception of Majnoon Island). In the end Iran failed to permanently occupy Iraqi lands or to defeat the Iraqi military, it wasn't long before the Iranians came to realize that victory was out of reach. Khomeini accepted the truce.
