= Operation Kheibar =

1984 Iran–Iraq War operation

- Part of the Battle of the Marshes of the Iran–Iraq War
| Date | 14 February – 19 March 1984 (1 month and 5 days) |
| Location | Lakes of the Hawizah Marshes in Iraq |
| Result | Iranian victory: Iraqi counter-attack failed to materialize (plan aborted) |
| Territorial changes | Iran captures the Majnoon Island; Iraq loses a sixth of its oil reserves |

Belligerents
| Iraq | Iran |

Commanders and leaders
| | (Iran) Ali Jajali (Iran) Mohsen Rezaee (Iran) Hossein Kharrazi (Iran) Mohammad Ebrahim Hemmat † (Iran) Hamid Bakeri † (Iran) Ali Hashemi |

Strength
| 250,000 | 250,000 Pasdaran and Basij |

Casualties and losses
| 3,000 killed 9,000 wounded 60 tanks lost | 20,000 killed 30,000 wounded 1,000 captured |

Operation Kheibar was an Iranian offensive in the Iran–Iraq War. It was part of the Battle of the Marshes.

== Prelude ==
After the unsuccessful major offensive named Operation Dawn V aimed directly at Basra, Iran opened a front at the lakes of the Hawizeh Marshes, in an attempt to open another venue from which Basra could be attacked. Due to sanctions Iran lacked spare parts for its American and British made equipment. This became a serious problem for Iran and led to heavy casualties.

Iran enjoyed a zealous force of Pasdaran and Basij, which could not be backed up with sufficient amount of artillery, air support and tanks.

== The battle ==
On February 14, 1984, Iran fought through Iraqi defenses to the oil-rich Majnoon Island. A loss would allow Iraq to regain all territory lost in the battle. Operation Kheibar was Iran's first strategic offensive. The IRIAF could only provide an inadequate 100 combat sorties per day on average. Because of Iran's lack of aircraft, they used helicopters to support their troops. Eventually the Iranians swept across the marshes and forced the Iraqis out of the Majnoon islands—a major disaster for Iraq. Iran now was ready to launch the final attack of the Battle of the Marshes. Iran followed up with a new offensive where 250,000 Iranian troops emerged from the marshland thrusting West and South in the direction of Al-Qurna and Basra respectively, but with the lack of air support as well as lack of armor and artillery, were very vulnerable to Iraqi armored and mechanized forces which managed to repel this large attack. The Iraqis succeeded in containing the Iranians to the Hawizah marsh.

== Aftermath ==
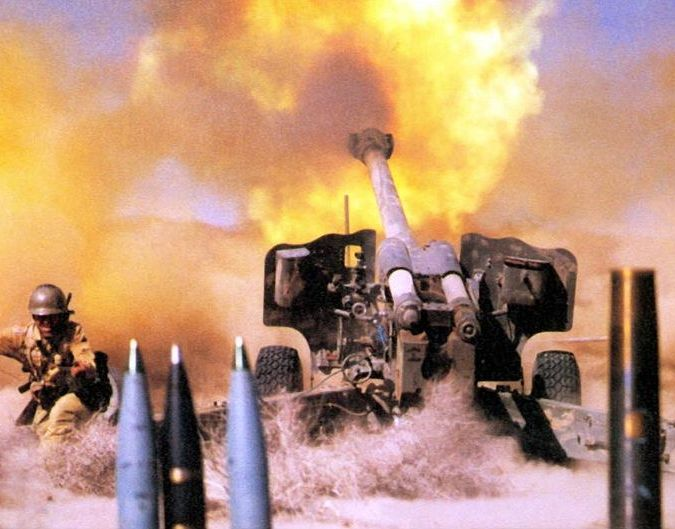
Iranian troops fire 152 mm D-20 howitzer

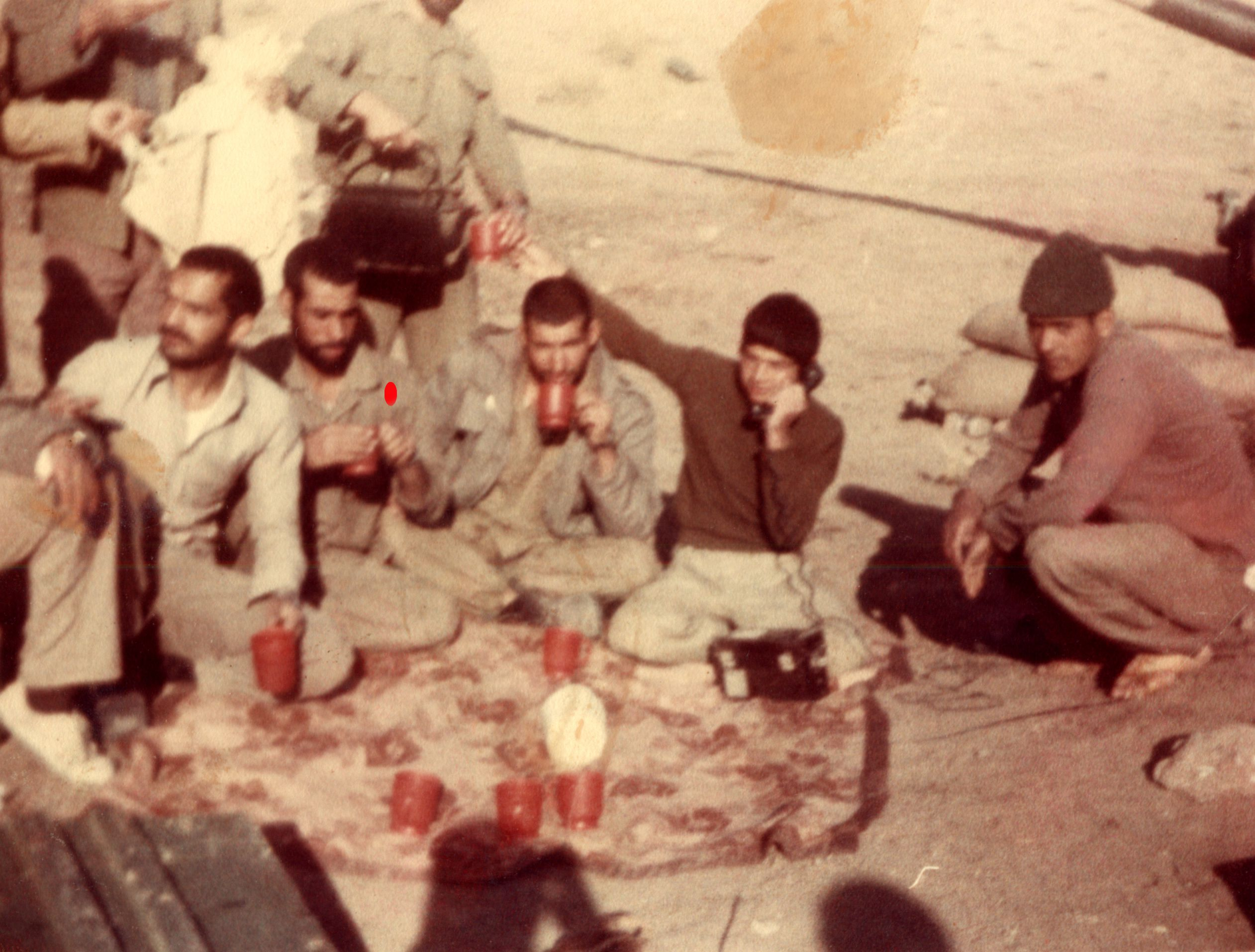
Iranian troops resting after exchange of fire 152 mm D-20 H

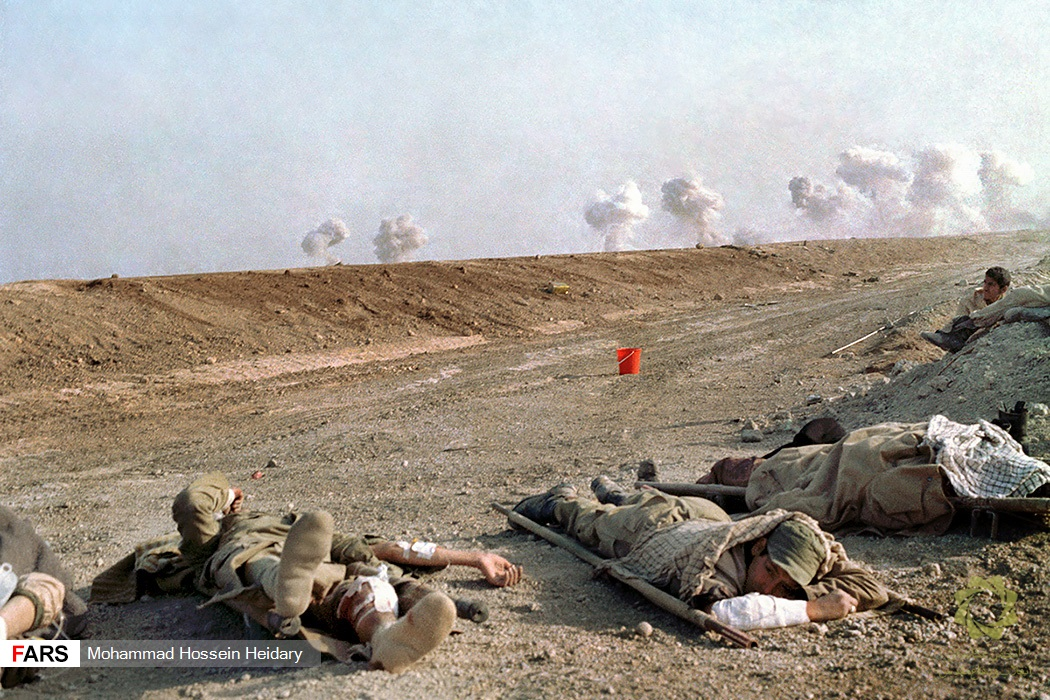
Iranian troops wounded by Iraqi mustard gas attacks during the operation

In the end Iran suffered 50,000 casualties in the battle of the Marshes, including the sniper Abdolrasoul Zarrin, and inflicted 12,000 casualties on Iraq. But for Iraq even 12,000 was an unacceptable toll, as Iraq had a smaller population to draw from. After the battle, Iran tried unsuccessfully to take the Baghdad–Basra highway with Operation Badr. At the end of the War, Iraq expelled the Iranians from Majnoon island by using combined-arms tactics coupled with chemical weapon attacks. Some of the Iranian commanders like Hamid Bakeri were killed in this battle.

== See also ==
The Mother of all Build-Ups, Air Combat Information Group

== Bibliography ==
- Tabatabai, A. M. (2020). No Conquest, No Defeat: Iran's National Security Strategy. United States: Oxford University Press, Incorporated.
- Hooton, E. R., Cooper, T., Nadimi, F. (2019). The Iran-Iraq War. Volume 2 (Revised and Expanded Edition): Iran Strikes Back, June 1982-December 1986. United Kingdom: Helion.
- Hiro, D. (1991). The Longest War: The Iran-Iraq Military Conflict. United Kingdom: Routledge.
- Pelletiere, S. C. (1992). The Iran-Iraq War: chaos in a vacuum. United Kingdom: Praeger.
