= Operation Karbala-7 =

1987 Iranian offensive in the Iran-Iraq War

- Part of the Iran–Iraq War
Date	4–8 March 1987
Location	Iraqi Kurdistan
Result	Iraqi defensive victory: Iranian tactical failure; Iran fails to reoccupy the summit of Kurda Mand Mountain; Iran captures Haj Omran highlands; Later Iranian attacks fail with heavy losses
Territorial changes	Iran captures Haj Omran highlands but fails to recapture its objective, the summit of Kurda Mand Mountain

Belligerents
Iraq	Iran

Operation Karbala-7 (Arabic: عملیات كربلاء ۷) was an Iranian offensive in Haj Omran during the Iran–Iraq War to prevent Iraq from rapidly transferring units to its defense lines at Basra after Iran had launched the failed Operation Karbala-5 to capture the city of Basra. This was a failed Iranian attempt to reoccupy the summit of Kurda Mand Mountain. There was an additional Iranian attack after this with the size of an infantry brigade on the night of 11–12 March, but this failed and suffered heavy losses.
