= Operation Karbala-4 =

1986 Iranian offensive in the Iran–Iraq War

- Part of the Iran–Iraq War
Date	25–27 December 1986
Location	Basra Governorate 30°26′N 48°07′E
Result	Iraqi victory: Successful Iraqi defense; Iranian offensive failure

Belligerents
Iraq	Iran

Commanders and leaders
(Iraq) Saddam Hussein (Iraq) Khalil al-Dhouri (Iraq) Jawad Rumi (Iraq) Bareq Haj Hintah	(Iran) Ruhollah Khomeini (Iran) Akbar Hashemi Rafsanjani (Iran) Hossein Kharrazi

Units involved
3rd Corps; 7th Corps	Najaf Corps; Quds Corps; Karbala Corps; Nouh Corps

Strength
Unknown	60,000

Casualties and losses
800 killed 2,000 wounded	8,000 killed 11,000 wounded 200 captured

Operation Karbala-4 was an Iranian offensive in the Iran–Iraq War on the southern front. The operation was launched after the failure of Operation Karbala-2 and Operation Karbala-3 to move the Iraqi lines in an effort to capture Iraqi territory.

== Prelude ==
The battle itself was planned and eventually executed by Akbar Hashemi Rafsanjani. The operation would be launched under cover of darkness in order to gain a foothold along the Shatt-al-Arab waterway. Once across, the Iranian forces would go on the offensive and eventually move onto the port city of Basra. The attack would be launched towards the Umm ar-Rasas Island in the Shatt al Arab. It most likely was meant as a diversionary attack before the upcoming Operation Karbala-5 (although it may have been called that only after it failed). It would attack from Umm ar-Rasas island to other islands and roads to help create a broad encirclement of Basra. It may have been rushed ahead to intimidate the Islamic Summit Conference meeting in then Iraqi ally Kuwait.

The Iraqis had constructed heavy static fortifications around the city. They built 5 defensive rings, supported by natural waterways such as the Shatt-al-Arab, and manmade ones, such as Fish Lake and the Jasim River, along with manmade earth barriers. Fish Lake was filled with mines, underwater barbed wire, electrodes and various sensors. In addition, behind each waterway and defensive line was radar-guided artillery, ground attack aircraft, and combat helicopters; all capable of firing poison gas in addition to conventional munitions.[12] Iran's strategy was to penetrate through these massive defensive lines, and encircle Basra, cutting off the city as well as the Al-Faw peninsula from the rest of Iraq. While being the largest and most sophisticated attack since 1984, it was actually a part of Iran's strategy of attrition, in order to strike an unsustainable blow against Iraq, as the Iranians had little hope of a decisive victory in the face of Iraq's massive rearmament. There were hopes that it could bring about Iraq's downfall through sheer depletion. [75] Iran's plan was for a diversionary attack near Basra (Karbala-4), the main offensive (Karbala-5), and another diversionary attack using Iranian armor in the north to have Iraqi heavy armor diverted away from Basra (Karbala-6).[12] For these battles, Iran had swelled their military ranks by recruiting many new Basij and Pasdaran volunteers.

== The battle ==
The operation began during Christmas night of 1986 with elite frogmen of the Pasdaran crossing the lake in rubber speedboats to launch a surprise attack upon Umm ar-Rasas Island. Upon landing, Iraqi searchlight operators found the frogmen. The Iranians were now totally exposed. Iraqi machine gunners opened up with a hail of bullets, killing all but a few of the Iranian force.

The following morning, 60,000 Pasdaran and Basijis crossed the Shatt al-Arab north and south of Khorramshahr in dinghies and motorized seacraft, using the cover of dawn to hide their movements. Almost immediately, the Iranians met the Iraqi defenses waiting for them on the shorelines of the island. A major drawback for the Iranians came in the form of little to no artillery support against the Iraqis. However the Iranians managed to overrun parts of Umm ar-Rasas and other islands, and they crossed them using pontoon bridges. But when they tried to move up the road along the waterway to envelop Basra from the south, they came under withering Iraqi fire.

A major inadequacy in Iranian military preparations for the offensive was the practically non-existent follow up support provided to their forces once they broke out from the islands. With the exception of limited artillery support, all of it remained on the Iranian side of the Shatt al-Arab and did not follow with the initial advance of their own forces. Fighting lasted for three days, during which the Iranian forces were pummeled by the Iraqi defenses. Iraqi troops used artillery, aircraft, and machine guns firing from prepared defenses. Iranian troops died by the thousands. Iraqi casualties were one-eighth that of Iranian losses. By the time the Iranians retreated, thousands of dead Iranian soldiers covered the landscape. Iran had lost 8,000 troops, while Iraq had lost 800. Iran claimed Iraq's defenses benefited from US supplied intelligence which provided details of Iranian plans and preparations, thus permitting Iraq to coordinate an effective defense as precise points where the attack occurred. Iraqi mistreatment of captured Iranian forces, including the burying alive of military divers became the subject matter for the 2015 Iranian film 175 Divers.

== Aftermath ==
The battle killed about 8,000 Iranians (while wounding 11000) and 800 Iraqis in those three days alone. However, this battle proved to be the beginning of a major offensive of which would last until February. The operation had been poorly planned, and doubtlessly rushed due to the Kuwait conference. The Iranians (with the exception of the night attack and the amphibious crossings) did not use their innovative tactics and mainly used human waves. The more sophisticated Operation Karbala-5 would be launched two weeks later and would eventually become the largest battle of the whole war.

Mehdi Mirzamehdi Tehrani the last commander of the Kamil Battalion of the 27th Mohammad Rasulullah Division in the Iran-Iraq War and a member of the first division of the Diver Ranger Battalion in Operation Karbala 4, stressed that at least one month before the operation, 100% of the diver units were ready And the strategy of the IRGC superiors and the road map, especially the wrong time and place, it was basically impossible to win this operation from the beginning, writes:

Until a few years ago, there was talk of Operation Karbala 4 being a taboo and an unfortunate sin. It was enough for a survivor, a battalion commander, a martyr father to say something as an oral history from the 3rd of December 1986! Either Anna was denied or the researcher and historian of oral history was so rejected that it was carelessly scientific. The author, as a member of the first division of the Diver Ranger Battalion in Operation Karbala 4, did everything I could to access the oral history of this operation, but to no avail. The first document for me was to find traces of the survivors. 60 battalions took part in Operation Karbala IV. I believe in this figure. I also believe that the IRGC had prepared a little more than 250 equipped battalions from destruction to divers and infantry. But only these 60 battalions started the operation on the 3rd of January at 20:20. At 12:10, our battalion did not reach the fish gorge until midnight. At 6 a.m. on January 25, the commanders agreed to withdraw, and the forces that had not regained their positions refused to move. At 11 a.m., Iraq began its heavy patrol against the Iranian forces, and at 11:45 p.m. The order to stop the operation was announced. Of my company, myself and Ali Khanlou, and of the total unit of 500 people, only 17 survived but were severely injured and disabled, the rest of the comrades were exhausted during these 4 hours.

== Returning bodies of 175 Iranian divers ==
On May 18, 2015, bodies of 175 Iranian divers who were reportedly buried alive with their hands tied returned to Iran. Some of the bodies were discovered with no injuries, and it was realized they were buried alive with their hands tied. The fighters belonged to four units from 25th, 41st, 7th and 14th divisions.

The repatriation led to an unprecedentedly emotional response on Iranian social media.

External image
- One of the 175 divers, who were buried alive with their hands tied during Operation Karbala 4

Funeral of Iranian KIA divers
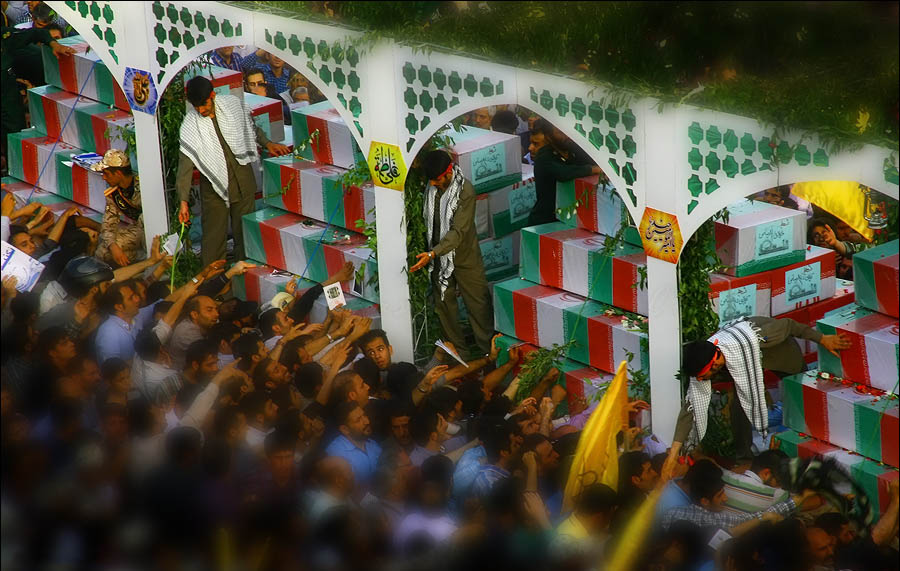

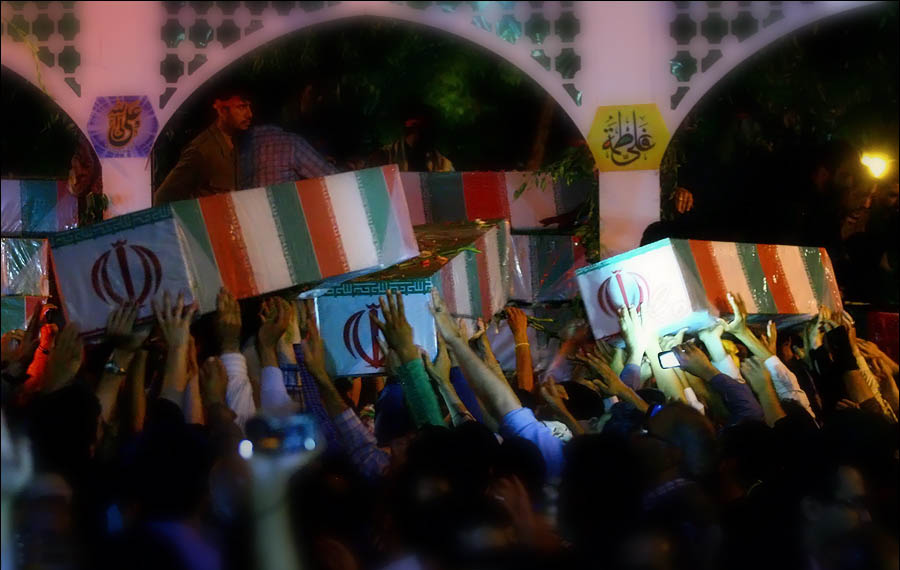

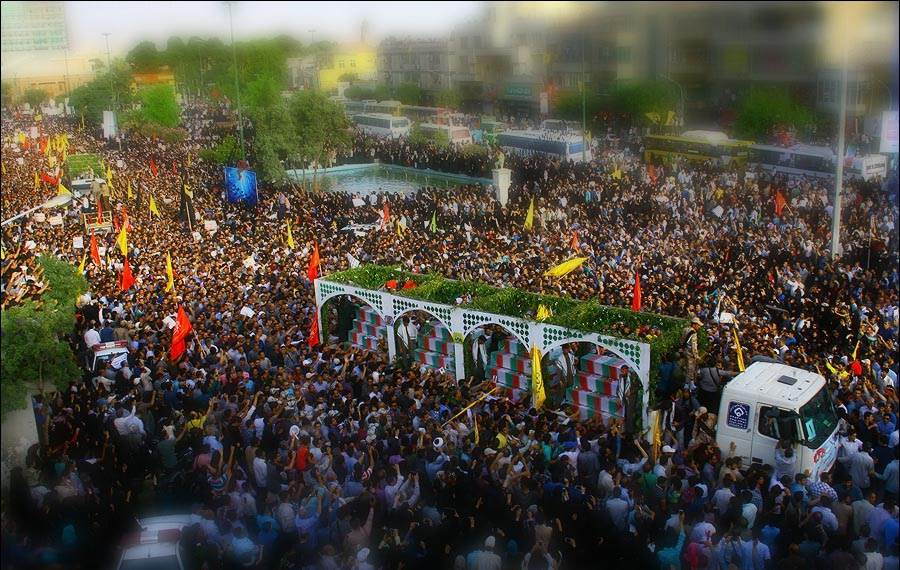

Iran later published a stamp for the 175 divers.

In 2015, Iranian filmmakers started production of a movie about the operation, naming it 175 Divers.

== Bibliography ==
1. Essential Histories: The Iran Iraq War 1980-1988, by Efraim Karsh, Osprey Publishing, 2002
2. In The Name of God: The Khomeini Decade, by Robin Wright, Simon & Schuster, 1989
3. In The Rose Garden Of The Martyrs: A Memoir Of Iran, by Christopher de Bellaigue, HarperCollins, 2005
4. http://csis.org/files/media/csis/pubs/9005lessonsiraniraqii-chap08.pdf
5. Farrokh, Kaveh (2011). Iran at War: 1500–1988. Osprey Publishing Limited. ISBN 9781780962214.
