= Shalamcheh =

Shalamcheh شلمچه
- Location in Iran
- Coordinates: 30°30′N 48°04′E
- Country: Iran
- Province: Khuzestan province

Shalamcheh (Persian: شَلَمچه) is a town located in Khuzestan province, Iran. It is situated on the border with Iraq, north-west of Abadan. The town was one of the main sites of invasion of Saddam Hussein's Iraq in the Iran–Iraq War. Some 50,000 Iranians died in the fighting around the town, and there is today a war memorial in their memory. The Basra–Shalamcheh rail line, one of the two railway projects connecting Iran to Iraq, is through Shalamcheh.

== History ==
=== 2026 Iran massacres ===
During the 2025–2026 Iranian protests, Iran International reported that on 2 January 2026, Iraqi militias affiliated with the Iranian government recruited forces to assist Iranian security forces in suppressing protests in Iran. The troops were reportedly transported through border crossings including Shalamcheh.

== See also ==
- Khosravi
