= Siege of Basra =

1987 battle of the Iran–Iraq War

Coordinates: 30.5000°N 47.8000°E

Siege of Basra Operation Karbala-5 The Great Harvest
- Part of the Iran–Iraq War
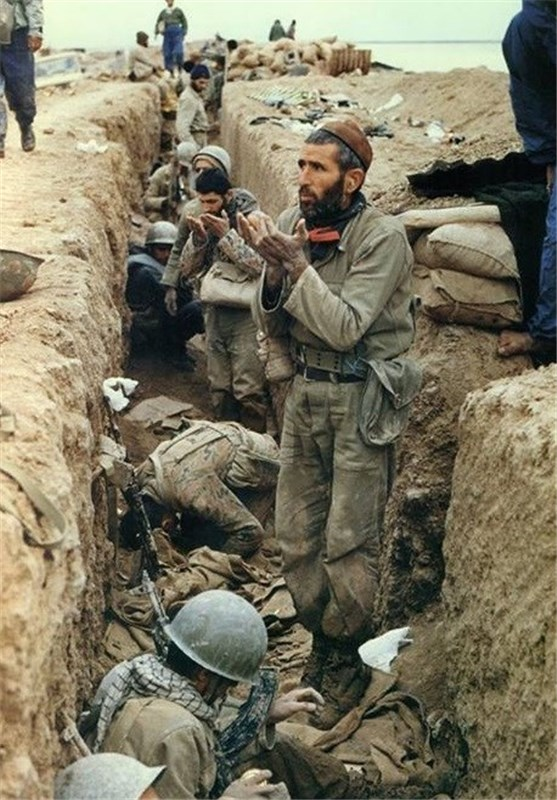
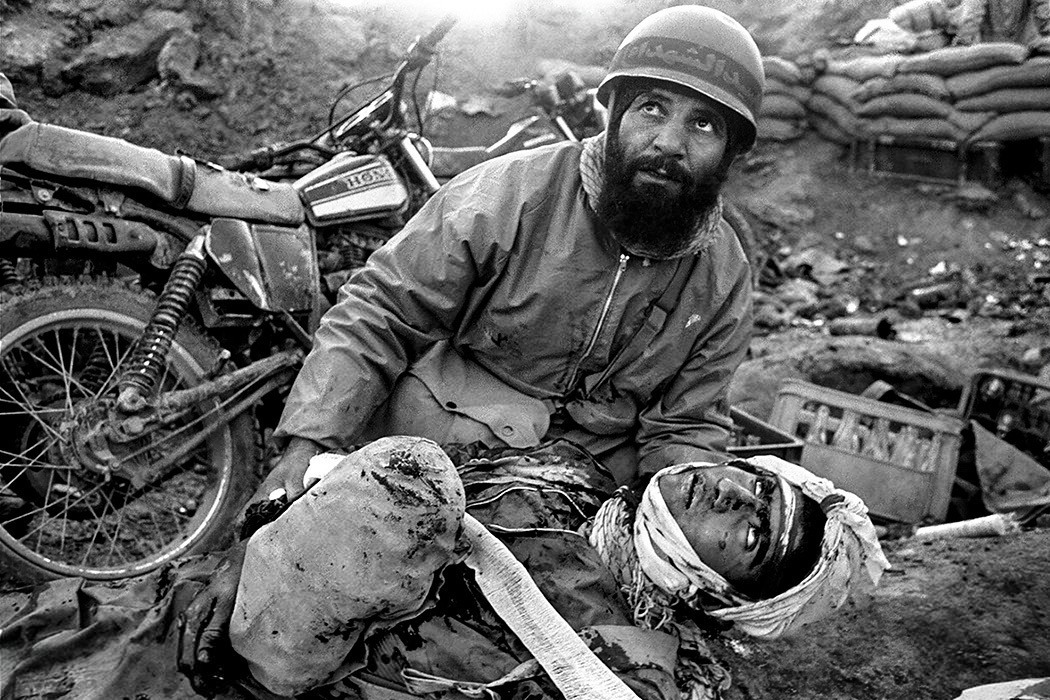
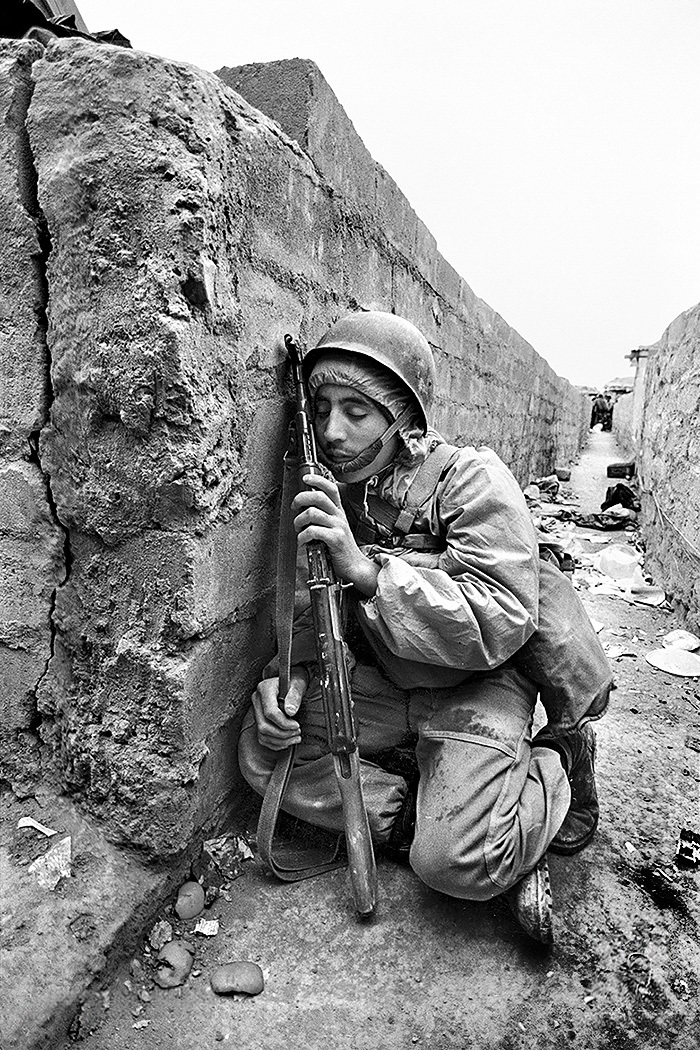
- Top-left to bottom-right: Map of Basra; Iranian soldiers praying inside a trench during the siege; Death of a Basiji; Iranian soldier sleeping during the siege
Date	8 January – mid April 1987 (3 months and 1 week)
Location	Basra Governorate
Result	Iraqi victory
Territorial changes	Iran crossed the border and captured a tiny sliver of Basra Governorate according to Iranian Colonel Mojtaba Jafari

Belligerents
Iraq	Iran

Commanders and leaders
(Iraq) Saddam Hussein; (Iraq) al-Rashid; (Iraq) Dhia ul-Din Jamal; (Iraq) Khalil al-Dhouri; (Iraq) Abdul-Wahid Shannan ar-Ribat; (Iraq) Riyadh Taha; (Iraq) Hassan Yusuf; (Iraq) Ibrahim Ismail; (Iraq) Hamid Salman; (Iraq) Bariq Hajj Hunta al-Zubaidi	(Iran) Akbar Hashemi Rafsanjani; (Iran) Mohsen Rezaee; (Iran) Hossein Kharrazi †; (Iran) Ali Sayyad Shirazi; (Iran) Esmail Daghayeghi †; (Iran) Saeed Jalili (WIA)

Units involved
3rd Corps; 8th Infantry Division; 11th Border Guards Division; 5th Mechanised Infantry Division; 6th Corps; 7th Corps; National Defense Battalions	Basij and Revolutionary Guards (70%): Najaf Corps; Quds Corps; Karbala Corps; Nouh Corps; Regular Army (30%) with some artillery and armour

Strength
300,000	150,000–200,000

Casualties and losses
10,000 killed, 1,750 captured Other estimates: 20,000 casualties 150 tanks and 10 aircraft lost	40,000 killed 80,000 wounded Other estimates: 65,000 casualties 218 armored vehicles 21 boats
- ≈2 million civilians displaced

The siege of Basra, code-named Operation Karbala-5 or The Great Harvest (Arabic: الحصاد الأكبر), was an offensive operation carried out by Iran in an effort to capture the Iraqi port city of Basra in early 1987. This battle, known for its extensive casualties and ferocious conditions, was the biggest battle of the war and proved to be the last major Iranian offensive. The Iranians failed to reach their objective.

== The battle ==
Operation Karbala-5 began midnight 8 January 1987, when a strike force of 35,000 Revolutionary Guards infantrymen crossed Fish Lake, while four Iranian divisions attacked at the southern shore of the lake, overrunning the Iraqi forces and capturing Duaiji, an irrigation canal. They used their bridgehead at Duaiji as a springboard. Between 9–10 January, the Iranians broke through the first and second defense lines of Basra south of the Fish Lake with tanks. The Iranians rapidly reinforced their forces with 60,000 troops and began to clear the remaining Iraqis in the area.

As early as 9 January, the Iraqis began a counter-attack, supported by newer Su-25 and Mig-29 aircraft and by 10 January the Iraqis were throwing every available heavy weapon in a bid to eject the Iranians. Despite being outnumbered 10–1 in the air, Iran's air defenses downed many Iraqi aircraft (45 jets in total), allowing Iran to provide close air support with their smaller air force, which also proved superior in dogfighting. Iraqi tanks floundered in the marshland and were defeated by Cobra helicopters and TOW missile-equipped anti-tank commandos. Though after January 13, Iraq was able to fully commit its air power, and this time Iraq did not hold back. Iraqi air force flew over 500 missions in support of Iraqi ground forces on January 14 and 15 alone, and managed to destroy 218 Iranian armored vehicles and 21 boats.

Despite superior Iranian infantry tactics, it was the depth of the Iraqi defences, that prevented the Iranians from achieving a victory. In spite of its reinforcements, Iran soon took so many additional casualties that it again lost forward momentum. By January 16, the U.S. estimated that the fighting had led to roughly 50,000 Iranian and 10,000 Iraqi casualties. The evidence of such casualty levels was all too tangible. Iran suffered an exceptionally high ratio of killed to wounded, and many of the dead were left on the battlefield.

On 19–24 January, Iran launched another infantry offensive, breaking the third line and driving the Iraqis across the Jasim river. The battle became a contest of which side could bring more reinforcements. By 29 January, the Iranians launched a new attack from the west of the Jasim river, breaking through the fourth line. They were within 15 km (9.3 mi) of the city. At this point, the battle became a stalemate. Iranian TV broadcast footage of the outskirts of Basra but the Iranians pushed no further. Iranian losses were so severe that Iraq took the offensive and pushed them back, containing the Iranians to the Shalamjah area. The fighting continued and 30,000 Iranians still held positions around Fish Lake. The battle bogged down into a trench war, where neither side could displace the other. Iran attacked several more times but without success. Karbala-5 officially ended by the end of February, but the fighting and siege of Basra continued.

Among those killed was an Iranian commander, Hossein Kharrazi as well as the commander of 9th Division "Badr" Esmail Daghayeghi. Roughly 50,000 Iranians and 10,000 Iraqis became casualties because of Operation Karbala-5.

The fighting during this operation was the heaviest and bloodiest during the war, with the area around Shalamcheh becoming known as the "Somme of the Iran-Iraq War". At one point, the situation had so worsened that Saddam ordered several of his officers to be executed. With Iranian aircraft concentrated at Basra, the Iraqis bombed Iranian supply routes with chemical weapons, as well as Iranian cities with conventional bombs, including Tehran, Isfahan and Qom. It is believed that around 3,000 Iranian civilians were killed in these attacks. Iran retaliated by firing eleven long-range missiles at Iraqi cities, inflicting casualties among civilians and killing at least 300.

The Iraqis had fought a defensive battle at Basra, they had succeeded in fighting the Iranians to a complete standstill thwarting their obsession with capturing the city. The end of the battle saw a considerable breakdown of Iranian morale as hereafter only a small percent signed up for volunteering in the Revolutionary Guards or Basij.

== Bibliography ==
- The Great War for Civilisation: The Conquest of the Middle East, by Robert Fisk, Knopf Books, 2005
- "The Gulf Iran Strikes on Two Fronts", by William E. Smith, Time, 26 January 1987
- "The Gulf", Time, 2 February 1987
- "The Gulf Life Among Smoldering Ruins", by Dean Fischer, Time, 30 March 1987
- In The Name of God: The Khomeini Decade, by Robin Wright, Simon and Schuster, 1989
- Essential Histories: The Iran–Iraq War, 1980–1988, by Efraim Karsh, Osprey Publishing, 2002
- Journey to Heading 270 Degrees, by Ahmad Dihqan and Paul Sprachman, Mazda Publishers, 2006
- The Longest War, by Dilip Hiro, Routlage Chapman & Hall, 1991.
- VIII Phase Five: New Iranian Efforts at "Final Offensives", 1986-1987
- Farrokh, Kaveh (20 December 2011). Iran at War: 1500-1988. Bloomsbury. ISBN 9781780962214.
