= Hassan Bagheri =

Iranian military commander (1956–1983)

Sardar Shaheed Hassan Bagheri
- حسن باقری
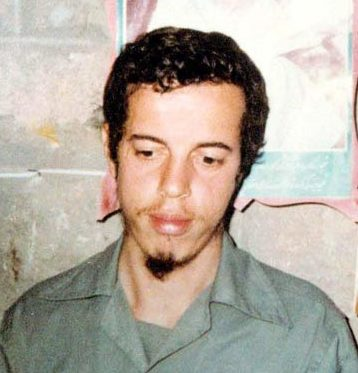
- Born: Qolamhossein Afshordi; March 16, 1956; Tehran, Pahlavi Iran
- Died: January 29, 1983 (aged 26); Fakkeh, Iran
- Education: Urmia University; University of Tehran
- Spouse: Parvin Daeepoor (m. 1981)
- Children: 1 girl: Narges
- Military career
- Allegiance: Pahlavi Iran (1978–1979); Iran (1979–1983)
- Branch: Imperial Iranian Ground Force; Islamic Revolutionary Committees (1979–1980); Islamic Revolutionary Guard Corps (1980–1983)
- Service years: 1978–1983
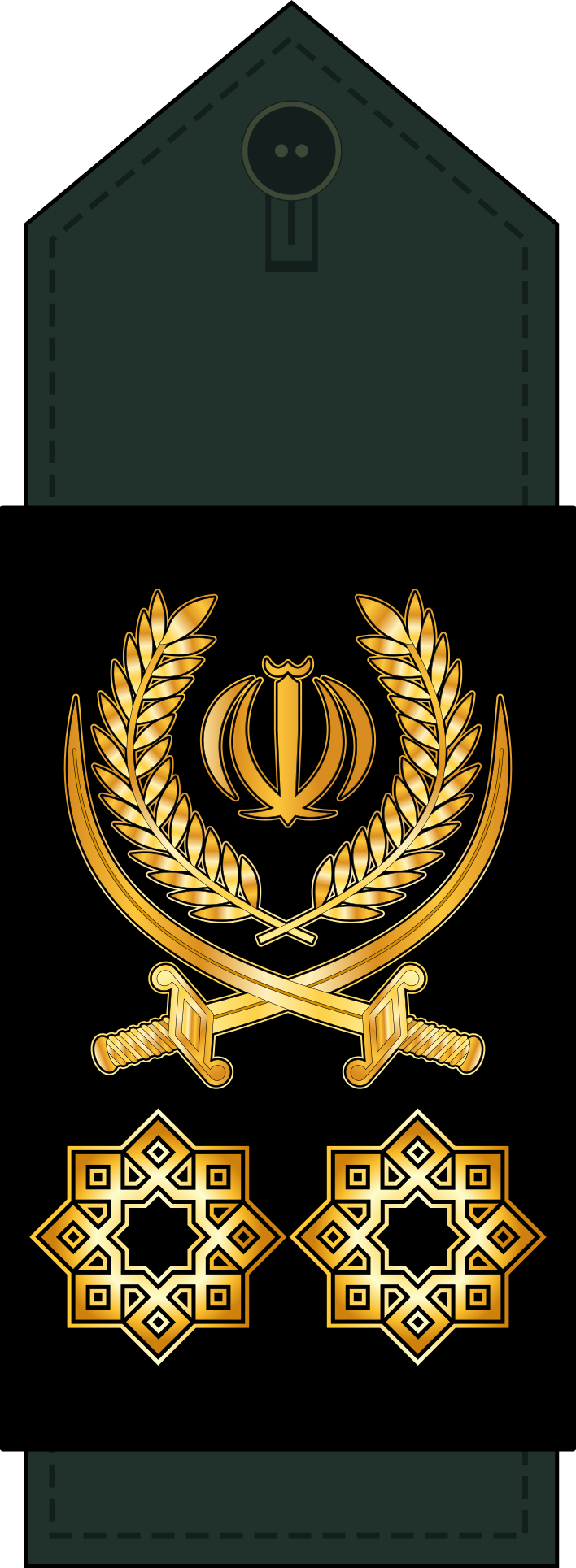
- Rank: Major General (posthumously)
- Unit: Ground Forces
- Commands: 5th Nasr Division (1983); Karbala Headquarters (1982); Darkhoveyn axis (1980 – 1981)
- Conflicts: Iran–Iraq War; First Battle of Khorramshahr; Operation Samen-ol-A'emeh; Operation Tariq al-Quds; Operation Fath ol-Mobin; Operation Beit ol-Moqaddas; Second Battle of Khorramshahr; Operation Ramadan
- Awards: Order of Fath (2nd Class)

Hassan Bagheri (born Qolamhossein Afshordi; March 16, 1956 – January 29, 1983) was an Iranian military officer and journalist, and prominent military figure in the Iran–Iraq War. He served as the deputy commander of the IRGC Ground Forces during the war, and was one of the senior IRGC commanders that played a key role in the Second Battle of Khorramshahr.

Bagheri was killed in action by a mortar shell in January 1983, shortly before the start of the Operation Before the Dawn during reconnaissance operations in Fakkeh. He was the brother of Mohammad Bagheri, former chief of staff the Iranian Armed Forces.

== Early life ==
Qolamhossein Afshordi was born on March 16, 1956, near Khorasan Square in Tehran, Iran. His family was from Afshord, a village in Heris, East Azerbaijan province. He attended Motarjem al-Dowleh School and Marvi High School.

=== Education ===
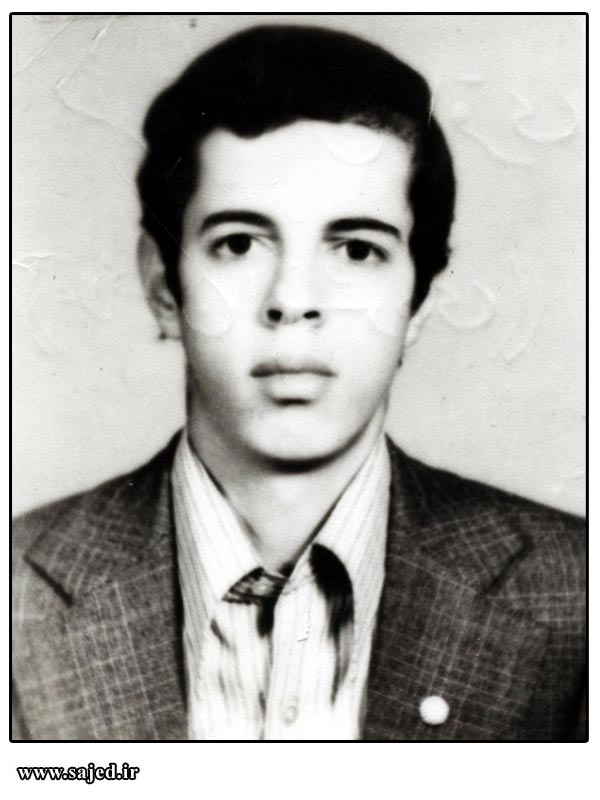
Picture of Hassan Bagheri when he was a teenager

In 1975, after obtaining a mathematics diploma, he began to study Animal husbandry at the Faculty of Agriculture of Urmia University. After the Iranian Revolution, he enrolled in the Iranian University Entrance Exam after receiving a literary diploma in June 1979. He was ranked 104th in entrance exam, so he was admitted at Tehran University in the field of judicial law.

=== Military service ===
In March 1978, Afshordi was conscripted into the Imperial Iranian Army. Upon completing training, he was transferred to Ilam in the Jaldian Garrison. During his military service, he became friends with the scholars of Ilam and especially Sadri (former Imam of Friday Prayer of Ilam. When it became known that he divulged military information he was no longer trusted and sent to work as a driver. In 1979, he deserted from the army and took part in the Iranian Revolution as a partisan. During the outbreak of the revolution, he, along with other relatives and friends, was present in the capture of 14 Police Station and Eshratabad Barracks in Tehran.

== Post–Iranian revolution and military career ==
Afshordi was active in the Islamic Revolutionary Committees and some other institutions until May 1979. In 1979, he started his activity by entering the cultural and political service section of the Islamic Republican newspaper. During this period, at the invitation of the United Nations, he made a 15-day trip to Lebanon and Jordan on behalf of this newspaper as a reporter, and during this trip, he prepared a comprehensive analytical report on the troubled situation of Muslims in that regions. After returning in June 1979, he got a diploma in literature and then took part in the university entrance exam again and was accepted with the 104th rank in the judicial law department of Tehran University.

At the beginning of 1980, he joined the Islamic Revolutionary Guard Corps (IRGC). This was where Afshordi changed his name to Hassan Bagheri as a nom de guerre. His job in the Intelligence Section was to identify anti-government rebel groups.

== Role in the Iran-Iraq war ==
With the start of the Iran-Iraq war, on September 22, 1980, Hassan Bagheri along with some IRGC members, went to the south of the country, when the position of the Iraqi forces was established in Khuzestan. Yahya Rahim Safavi considers Hassan Bagheri one of the genius commanders of the Islamic Revolutionary Guard Corps. During the time Hassan Bagheri was in the war, using the experiences he gained during his time as a journalist in Iran and Lebanon, he collected information, maps and operational calculations and record audios on the fronts of Iran and turned these documents into organized reports.

=== Intelligence and combat unit ===
Bagheri left for the southern front on September 23, 1980, and set up a combat intelligence unit from the moment he arrived. He personally penetrated the positions of the units of the Iraqi Army's 3rd Corps in order to obtain information about the enemy's situation.

Bagheri is the founder of IRGC Intelligence and Operations Unit. From the beginning of his arrival in Ahvaz at Montazerane Shahadat Base, in order to obtain appropriate information about the enemy's position, along with intelligence elements, he collected maps and implemented the situation of operational areas on them. His activities in this field by organizing intelligence elements and conducting a brief training for them, led to the establishment of the Intelligence and Operations Unit in the Southern Operations Headquarters. After about 3 months from the start of the war, these units were deployed in all southern axes (from Abadan to Dezful).

Hassan Bagheri had a great talent in analyzing the enemy's information and predicting possible movements of the Iraqi army in the future. One of his predictions in December 1980 was regarding the movement of Iraqi army forces to join the north–south axis of Susangerd region to connect Jafir and Bostan, which Iraq did less than a week after Bagheri's prediction with the installation of numerous military bridges and extensive efforts.

=== Deputy of the Southern Operations Headquarters ===
He was elected as one of the deputies of the southern operation headquarters in December 1980 and played an important role in the defeat of the siege of Susangerd, the operation of Imam Mahdi, the Operation Fath ol-Mobin, liberation of the heights of Allah Akbar and Dehlaviyeh. These battles were carried out in a situation where the regular operations of the internal forces had encountered problems and often remained without results. After the removal of Abolhassan Banisadr and according to the political conditions of that time in Iran, Bagheri participated in the Operation Farmandeh Kole Ghowa and after the injury of Yahya Rahim Safavi, he took over the leadership of the operation.

=== Darkhoveyn axis command ===
Hassan Bagheri, who was in charge of the Darkhoveyn axis and Mahshahr road in the Operation Samen-ol-A'emeh, played a role in planning, organizing, and obtaining news and information from the enemy in the operation to break the siege of Abadan

=== Operation Tariq al-Quds ===
In the Operation Tariq al-Quds, when a joint headquarters was established between the IRGC and the Iranian Army for the first time, Bagheri was present at the headquarters of the joint operations command as the deputy commander of the IRGC.

Hassan Bagheri was injured in an accident at night during the preparation stage of the operation and was taken to the hospital. His brother says about this:

"In the hospital, at moments when it was not known whether he would survive or not, and even though he could hardly speak, he asked: What about Sabeleh Bridge in the operation?"

Although he was ordered to take complete medical rest for a month, he left the hospital after a week and returned to the southern operation headquarters.

=== Command of Nasr camp ===
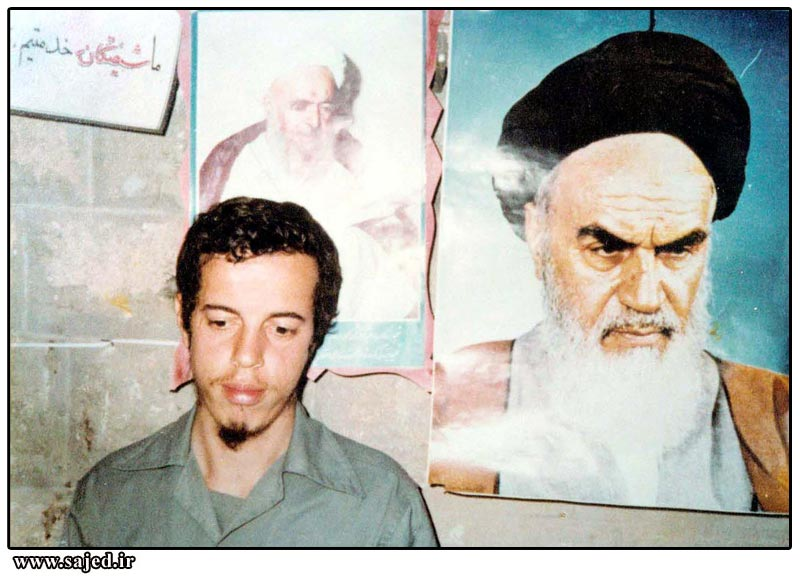
Hassan Bagheri next to Ruhollah Khomeini's photo

Hassan Bagheri was in charge of the Nasr camp during the Fath ol-Mobin, Beit ol-Moqaddas and Ramadan operations.

=== Operation Fath ol-Mobin ===
According to the size of the operational area, before the start of the Operation Fath ol-Mobin, four camps were identified to control and guide the operation. Due to the greater sensitivity of the northern axis of the region, Hassan Bagheri was chosen as the commander of Nasr camp (joint army and IRGC camp) in this faction. In the first stage of the Fath ol-Mobin operation, Nasr camp successfully achieved all the set goals. Also, in the second phase of the operation, the Iranian forces captured the Radar Heights (called Abusalbikhat).

=== Operation Beit ol-Moqaddas ===
Bagheri presented the plan of the Beit ol-Moqaddas operation for the liberation of Khorramshahr in the Karbala camp and in the presence of other commanders. In this plan, 40,000 to 50,000 troops were transferred from the Karun River to the enemy's positions at night to capture the enemy's main points. The plan of this operation was reviewed and approved for 20 days and nights in the Karbala camp with the active presence of Hasan Bagheri, Ali Sayad Shirazi, Gholam Ali Rashid, Mohsen Rezaee, Yahya Rahim Safavi and other commanders of units and divisions of the IRGC and the army.

During the Second Battle of Khorramshahr, Bagheri's forces in the Nasr camp, by encircling the enemy and preventing their advance in the Shalamcheh area, provided the ground for the break the siege and liberation of Khorramshahr by the Fath camp.

=== Operation Ramadan ===
During the Operation Ramadan, which began on July 14, 1982, in the Shalamcheh operational area, which is east of the southern Iraqi city of Basra, the forces under Bagheri's command passed through explosive traps and mines, and reached a depth of 27 kilometers into the Iraqi territory and near the city of Basra.

=== Command of Karbala camp ===
After the end of the disastrous Ramadan operation, in which the Nasr camp participated as a precautionary force, Bagheri was appointed by Mohsen Rezaee, the commander in chief of the IRGC at the time, to the command of the Karbala camp and the deputy commander in the southern camps. In the camp of Karbala, while laying the foundation for the operation of Muslim ibn Aqil, Bagheri also planned the operation of Muharram. After the successful completion of the Muharram operation, Bagheri was appointed as the deputy commander of the IRGC ground unit.

== Death ==
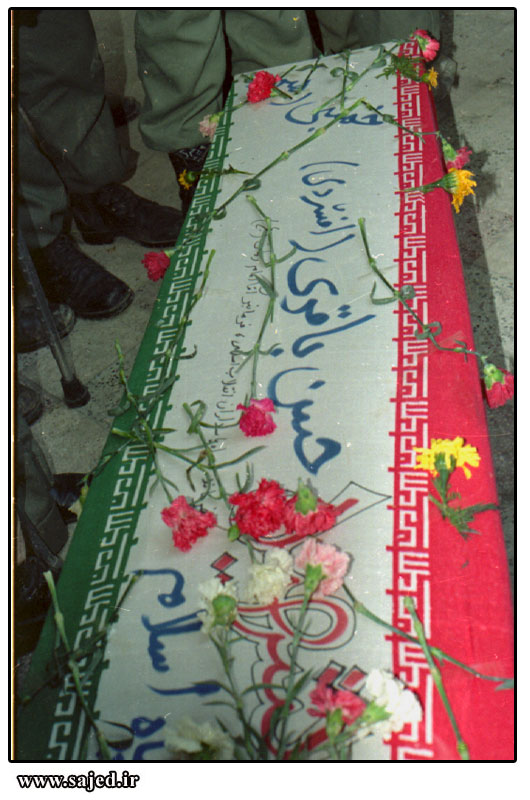
The coffin of Hassan Bagheri

Bagheri was hit by a mortar shell and killed on January 29, 1983 shortly before the start of the Operation Before the Dawn, along with a group of members of the IRGC, while conducting reconnaissance operations in Fakkeh area, in the Khuzestan Province. Also after the impact of the mortar shell, Tawakkul Qalavand (Deputy Intelligence Officer of Najaf Base) and Majid Baqaei were also killed and Morteza Saffari was seriously injured. Hassan Bagheri was 26 years old when he died. His burial place is Section 24 Martyr Tomb of Behesht-e Zahra. A highway in Tehran is named in his memory.

== War strategy method ==
Afshordi was very interested in staffing and training forces for command. Mehdi Zeinoddin is one of his most famous trainee, who later became the commander of the 17th Ali ibn Abi Taleb Division. Also, Hossein Ali Turki, the first commander of the 17th Ali ibn Abi Taleb Division was one of the trainee of Afshordi. Hossein Ali Turki was killed in Shush on January 26, 1982, due to a mortar hit. According to Mohsen Rezaee, the commander of the IRGC during the war, the success of Iran's armed forces was achieved through the method of experimental development, of which Hassan Bagheri was one of its experts and creators. This method led to the development of a defense system including defense thought, principles and rules of operation, military doctrine and principles and rules of war for Iran. This method was based on logical principles and basic experiences in the first year of the battle between Iran and Iraq forces, which was built with the help of logical principles from the basic experiences of revolutionary defense knowledge. Documentation of experiences and experimental conceptualization and development of knowledge is the basic axis of this method.

== Personal life ==
Hassan Bagheri married Parvin Daeepoor in August 1981, whom he had a daughter with and named her Narges.

== Works about him ==
The most important works that have been published so far about Hassan Bagheri (Qolamhossein Afshordi) are (All in Persian):

- Akharin Roozhaye Zemestan (lit. 'The Last Days of Winter'), Mohammad Hossein Mahdavian, Ten-episode television series, 2012
- Sirate Sardaran (lit. 'The Biographies of the Chiefs'), Islamic Revolutionary Guard Corps Publication, 1987
- Pirahane Sefid (lit. 'The White Shirt'), Hassan Bani Ameri, Foundation for the Preservation and Publication of Sacred Defense Works and Values, 1995
- Saqqaye Basij (lit. 'ُThe Mobilization Power Giver'), Samira Aslanpoor, Congress Commemorating Martyred Generals of Tehran Province, 1997
- Chashme Bidare Hamaseh (lit. 'The Waking Eye of the Epic'), Mohammad Khosravi, Congress Commemorating Martyred Generals of Tehran Province, 1997
- Chashme Jebheh'Ha (lit. 'The Eye of the Fronts'), Samira Aslanpoor, Congress Commemorating Martyred Generals of Tehran Province, 1997
- Haft Bande Eltehab (lit. 'The Seven Points of Inflammation'), Abbas Moshfeq Kashani, Congress Commemorating Martyred Generals of Tehran Province, 1997
- Bi Karaneha (lit. 'The Limitless People'), Einollah Kavandi, Congress Commemorating Martyred Generals of Tehran Province, 1997
- Ta Maah Kamel Shavad (lit. 'Until the Moon is Full'), Samira Aslanpoor, Congress Commemorating Martyred Generals of Tehran Province, 1998
- Hemaseh Sazane Asre Imam Khomeini (Jeld 3) (lit. 'Epic Makers of Imam Khomeini's Era (Volume 3)'), Humanities Research Institute and Imam Hossein University, Congress Commemorating Martyred Generals of Tehran Province, 1998
- Gozideye Adabiate Dastane Moaser (Majmooe Dastane 18) (lit. 'Selection of Contemporary Fiction Literature (Story Collection 18)'), Samira Aslanpoor, Neistan Book, 1999
- Nabardhaye Sharqe Karun be Revayate Farmandehan (lit. 'The Battles of East Karun According to the Commanders'), Seyyed Ali Bani Lohi and Hadi Morad Piri, War Studies and Research Center, 2000
- Yadegaran (Jeld 4: Ketabe Bagheri) (lit. 'The Memorial Peoples (Volume 4: Book Bagheri)'), Farzaneh Mardi, Ravayat-e Fath Publication, 2002
- Mosafer (lit. 'The Passenger'), Davoud Bakhtiari Daneshvar, Bureau of Literature and Art of Resistance, 2002
- Khaneye Koochak, Zendegie Bozorg: Goftogoo ba Parvin Daeepoor; Hamsare Sardar Shahid Hassan Bagheri (lit. 'Small house, Big Life: A Conversation with Parvin Daeepoor; Wife of Martyr Chief Hassan Bagheri'), Morteza Sarhangi, Kaman Publication, 2003
- Looti va Atash "Zendeginameye Sardar Shahid Hassan Bagheri" (lit. 'The Sincere and The Fire "Biography of Martyr Chief Hassan Bagheri"'), Rahim Makhdoomi Shorbiani, Sarir Publication, 2005
- Shahid Hassan Bagheri (Qolamhossein Afshordi) (lit. 'The Martyr Hassan Bagheri (Qolamhossein Afshordi)'), Gholam Ali Rashid and Saeed Sarmadi, Shakib Publication, 2005
- Dakale Aboozar (lit. 'The Aboozar Mast'), Fathollah Jafari, Bureau of Literature and Art of Resistance, 2007
- Bagheri (Be Soorate Ketabcheh) (lit. 'Bagheri (In the Form of a Booklet)'), Ali Akbari, Ya Zahra Publication, 2008
- Narmafzare Chand Resane'ie Hassan Bagheri (lit. 'Hasan Bagheri's Multimedia Software'), Shahed Publication, 2008
- Lohe Feshordeye Yadvareye Sardare Nasr (Hassan Bagheri) (lit. 'The Compact Disk of Memorial of Victory Chief (Hassan Bagheri)'), Vice President of Social and Cultural Affairs of Region 13 Municipality, 2008
- Shahid Afshordi (Bagheri) (lit. 'The Martyr Afshordi (Bagheri)'), Farzam Shirzadi, Madreseh Publication, 2009

== See also ==
- Mohammad Bagheri
- Mohsen Rezaee
- Mohammad Ebrahim Hemmat
- Mehdi Zeinoddin
- Husayn Kharrazi
- Mohammad Ali Naseri
- Operation Ghader
