= Operation Shining Sun =

1988 military operation in Iran

Operation Shining Sun, also known as Operation Sunshine or Operation Aftab, was the first major military operation of the National Liberation Army of Iran, the militant arm of the People's Mojahedin Organization of Iran. The goal of the leftist organization was to overthrow the Khomeini regime.

== Background ==
=== Groups Involved ===
The People's Mojahedin Organization of Iran (MEK or PMOI) was originally an anti-Shah student movement founded in 1965. The group was one of a handful of revolutionary organizations that toppled the Shah's government. While the MEK supported the 1979 Islamist overthrow of the Shah, the group came into conflict with Ruhollah Khomeini's new government. In 1981, it went into exile in France.(subscription required) The MEK was expelled by the French government in 1986; the group's expulsion was a condition of a deal between the Chirac administration and Iran that led to the release of French hostages held by Iranian-backed groups in Lebanon. The MEK shifted their base of operations to Iraq, and the following year established a military front, the National Liberation Army of Iran (NLAI). The NLAI's initial tactics were centered on hit-and-run attacks that prioritized quick strikes and hasty retreats to avoid excessive losses. Because of defections from the Iranian military to the NLAI resulting from NLAI military successes, the NLAI assumed the more military operations they conducted the more Iranian soldiers would defect. So their main military strategy was to conduct frequent operations to increase defections.

NLAI units commenced operations toward the end of 1986, well in advance of the official announcement of the army's establishment in the first half of 1987. The primary objective behind the army's inception was to carry out the overthrow of the Islamic Republic. The NLAI first targeted the Revolutionary Guards and later extended operations against military units. The NLAI viewed the Islamic Republic as agents of oppression.

At the time of Operation Shining Sun's execution, the NLAI's forces reportedly included up to 30,000 trained fighters, who were largely equipped with common Soviet arms that were often augmented with captured battlefield equipment.

The Iranian forces involved in the battle were primarily elements of the 77th Khorassan Division. This division had recently seen combat in Operation Karbala-6 (1987) and Operation Badr (1985), in addition to its earlier participation in Operation Ramadan (1982). This combined arms infantry division had access to American-made M47 and M48M Patton tanks, Soviet-made BTR-50 armored personnel carriers, and Soviet T-72S tanks.

=== Region ===
The Fakkeh region, where the battle took place, is located near the border of Khuzestan province in southwest Iran and Maysan Governorate in southeast Iraq. The region maintains strategic importance due to the presence of the al-Fakkah oil field.

== Battle ==
The NLAI formed fifteen regiments of light infantry and mechanized infantry utilizing small arms and artillery. The Iranian forces of the 77th Infantry Division were composed of light and mechanized infantry utilizing M-47 Pattons, M48M Pattons, BTR-50's, and T-72S's. The battle began on 28 March 1988 when Maryam Rajavi gave the order over the NLAI communications network,"In the glorious memory of the People's Mojahedin martyrs and all the martyrs of the National NLA of Iran...fire!'. The following evening Iranian forces launched a counterattack which NLAI successfully repelled. There are conflicting accounts regarding the battle's duration, though it is agreed the battle lasted for no longer than 24 hours. The NLAI seized 600 square kilometers of territory from Iran and control of the strategic international Dezful-Amarah highway, west of the city of Shush.

The MEK claimed to have caused 3,500 military casualties and captured an additional 417 Iranian soldiers, while only suffering the loss of 123 soldiers of its own forces. NLAI forces reportedly seized an extensive suite of weapons, including four US-made M-47 tanks and an M-113 armored personnel carrier. A mobile rocket launcher and five 106 mm guns, in addition to a cache of 750 assault rifles, were also reportedly seized; some weapons were taken for use and the others destroyed.

=== Role of Women ===
Following the Iranian Revolution and the subsequent years during the Iran-Iraq war, the rights of Iranian women were heavily suppressed by the Ayatollah Khomeini's government, causing many to turn to the Mojahedin. The MEK was jointly led by Massoud Rajavi and his wife, Maryam. Feminism were core parts of the MEK ideology which also drew influence from Islam.

Women would take part in operations following intensive training including providing logistical and tactical support. Operation Shining Sun was the first offensive launched by the NLAI to use women in combat. Their success in the operation led to the merging of the men and women brigades in the following missions: Operation Forty Stars and Operation Eternal Light.

== Outcome ==
Operation Shining Sun served to cement the Mojahedin's legitimacy as a political-militant movement, both in the eyes of the NLAI and the Iranian Government. This operation, which added legitimacy to the insurgency and resulted in thousands of casualties on Iranian troops, forced the attention of the Iranian government, as it could no longer deny the offensive capabilities of the Mojahedin. The Iranian Government's shift served to attempt to counter the strategic movement of the NLAI from a guerilla to large-scale force, a movement further reinforced by the NLAI's attack on Mehran (in which the NLAI held Mehran for 3 days) shortly after Operation Shining Sun.

The operational success of Operation Shining Sun in the overrunning of the Fakkeh sector, as well as the participation of women on the side of the NLAI, served to dramatically demoralize Iranian troops. Overall, this operation reflected the growing strength and confidence of the NLAI, who continued their attacks against Iran following this operation.^{11}
