= Mehdi Zeinoddin =

Iranian military commander (1959–1984)

Mahdi Zeinoddin مهدی زین‌الدین
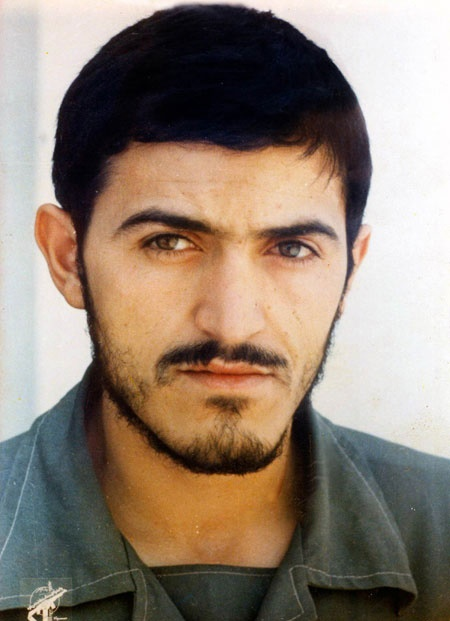
- Born: 11 October 1959; Tehran, Imperial State of Iran
- Died: 18 November 1984 (aged 25); Iran
- Military career
- Allegiance: Islamic Revolutionary Guard Corps
- Rank: Major General
- Commands: 17th Ali ibn Abi Taleb Brigade
- Conflicts: Iran–Iraq War; Operation Beit ol-Moqaddas; Operation Ramadan; Operation Muharram; Operation Dawn 3; Operation Dawn 4; Operation Kheibar

Mehdi Zeinoddin (also spelled Mahdi Zeinoddin) (Persian: مهدی زین‌الدین; 1959–1984) was an Iranian major general in the IRGC during the Iran–Iraq War and he was the commander of the Ali ibn Abi Taleb Division. He was killed during battle with secession-seeking forces on the 18th of November 1984 on the highway from Kermanshah to Sardasht.

== Early life ==
Mahdi Zeinoddin was born in Tehran on 11 October 1959. His father owned a bookstore and he spent most of his youth selling books and helping his father around the bookstore. His mother was a Quran teacher.

During his high school years, he developed political views and established close ties with Ayatollah Asadollah Madani. He opposed the regime of Mohammad Reza Pahlavi. At this time, his family were living in Khorramabad when his father was exiled to Saqqez due to his political activities. Here, he was expelled from the high school for refusing to join the Rastakhiz Party and for resisting against the Pahlavi regime. Despite this, he continued his education and earned a diploma in natural science. In 1977, he gave several university entrance exams and was accepted by Shiraz University. After a period of time, his father was banished to Fars province once again. Once again, his family were exiled to Saqqez due to his father's political activities and thus, he was unable to continue his studies. After a while, his father was once again exiled from Saqqez to Eqlid and as revolutionary activity had started, his father secretly moved to Qom with his family. Along with other politically influential characters, Mahdi and his father continued their revolutionary efforts in Qom. Mahdi was accepted to a university in France, but he decided not to go after hearing that Imam Khomeini was urging the youth to stay in Iran.

== After the Iranian Revolution ==
Following the Iranian revolution, Zeinoddin joined the intelligence section of the IRGC and was pivotal in quelling the enemies of the Revolution in Tabriz and Qom.

During the Iran-Iraq War, Zeinoddin went to the front lines with a group of one hundred people after passing a short military course. After a while, he was elected as the head of the intelligence section and then he became the mission director of intelligence for the IRGC in Dezful and Susangerd. He was also responsible for the intelligence and operations of the Nasr headquarters during the Beit ol-Moqaddas operation and the liberation of Khorramshahr. He was then elected as the commander of the 17th Ali ibn Abi Taleb Division.

== Death ==
On 18 November 1984, Mahdi Zeinoddin and his brother were travelling from Kermanshah to Sardasht when they were attacked by secessionist Kurdish rebels and were both killed in the attack. He was buried in the fifth sector of the Gulzar-e Shuhada Cemetery in Qom.

== See also ==
- List of Iranian commanders in the Iran–Iraq War
- Shahid Zeyn-o-ddin Metro Station
- Mohammad Ebrahim Hemmat
- Ali Hashemi
- Hassan Bagheri
