= Mohammad Ebrahim Hemmat =

Iranian military leader and teacher (1955–1984)

Sardar Mohammad Ebrahim Hemmat
- محمدابراهیم همت
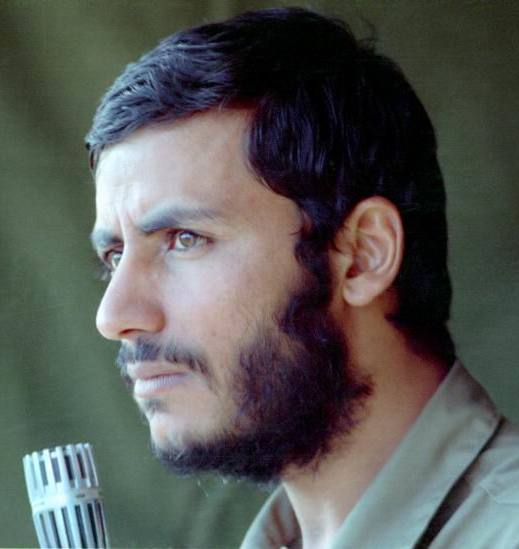
- Hemmat speaking to his troops
- Born: Mohammad Ebrahim Hemmat; 2 April 1955; Shahreza, Pahlavi Iran
- Died: 7 March 1984 (aged 28); Majnoon Island, Ba'athist Iraq
- Burial place: Imamzadeh Shahreza; 32.0338°N 51.8773°E
- Military career
- Allegiance: Pahlavi Iran; Iran
- Branch: Imperial Iranian Ground Force; Islamic Revolutionary Committees; Islamic Revolutionary Guard Corps
- Service years: 1975–1977; 1979–1984
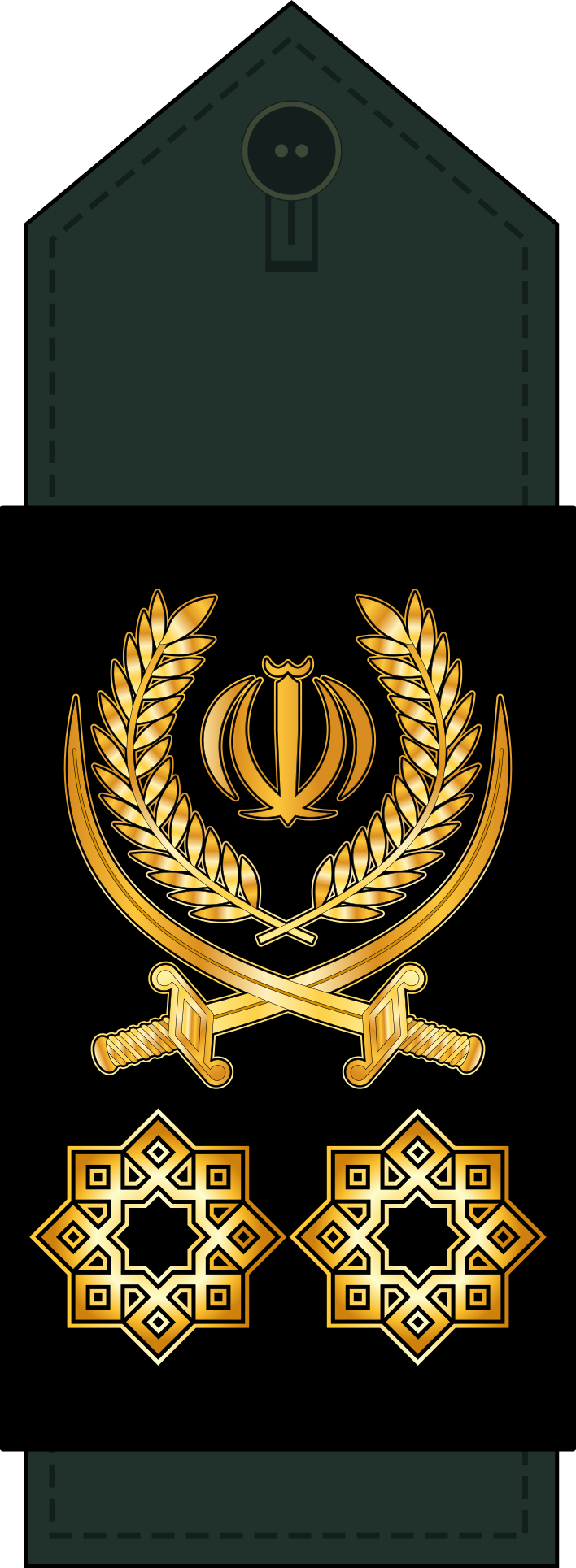
- Rank: First sergeant Major General (posthumously)
- Unit: Isfahan 55 field Artillery Group (1975–1977)
- Commands: 27th Mohammad Rasulullah Division (1982–1984); Chief of staff of the 27th Mohammad Rasulullah Division (1982); Zafar Headquarters (1982); 11th Qadr Corps (1983)
- Conflicts: 1979 Kurdish rebellion in Iran; Lebanese Civil War; 1982 Lebanon War; Iran–Iraq War; Operation Tariq al-Quds; Operation Fath ol-Mobin; Operation Beit ol-Moqaddas; Operation Ramadan; Operation Dawn-4; Operation Muslim ibn Aqil; Operation Muharram; Operation Kheibar †
- Awards: Order of Fath (2nd Class)

Mohammad Ebrahim Hemmat (Persian: محمدابراهیم همت, April 2, 1955 – March 7, 1984) was an Iranian military leader and teacher. He was one of the highest-ranking officers of the Islamic Revolutionary Guard Corps during the Iran-Iraq War. In 1982, he spent a few months fighting against Israel during the 1982 Lebanon War. He then returned to Iran and held commanding roles in several missions during the Iran-Iraq War. He was killed in action in March 1984 in Operation Kheibar.

== Early life and career ==
Mohammad Ebrahim Hemmat was born on the 2nd of April 1955 in Shahreza. He completed his studies in his hometown and in the year 1973, he earned a diploma. That year he enrolled in the Isfahan University of Teacher Training. He earned his associate degree in 1975 and two years later, he served his compulsory military service. After his military service, he returned to his birthplace and for a while, he taught history in the Shahreza Middle School and several schools on the outskirts of the city. During this period, he tried to familiarize the students with the concept of revolution and for this reason, he was given several warnings from the SAVAK for supposed anti-government activities. His words had such an impact that he was forced to travel from city to city, fleeing from the Shah's agents. He first went to Firuzabad and propagated support for the Iranian Revolution there. After a while, he moved to Yasuj. He left for Dogonbadan, barely escaping arrest and eventually, he settled down in Ahvaz. As the Revolution was coming to its climax in 1978, he returned to Shahreza and actively led protests there. At the end of one of these rallies, he was sentenced to death due to his anti-regime activities and had to disguise his appearance and struggle in secret until the end of the Iranian Revolution.

== Military career ==
Following the Revolution, Hemmat and his companions worked to establish order in the city. They formed the Islamic Revolutionary Committees, a religious police force formed to safeguard the nascent revolutionary government in Iran and counter anti-governmental elements within the country. Hemmat was appointed director of IRGC's Public Relations in his hometown of Shahreza.

In 1979, he was dispatched to Paveh, Kurdistan, to quell the Kurdish rebellion. Hemmat lived in the Kurdistan province for two years; he had a significant role to deal with the poverty with the population in the province. Hemmat served two years as the commander of IRGC in Paveh. The locals became upset when he wanted to leave the region.

=== Iran–Iraq War ===
When Iraq invaded Iran, Hemmat joined the military and departed for the southern front. Ahmad Motevaselian and Hemmat were commissioned by the commander-in-chief of the IRGC to form the 27th Mohammad Rasulullah Division.

He was the commander of a significant part of Operation Fath ol-Mobin. Hemmat played an important role in Operation Beit ol-Moqaddas where he served as the deputy commander of the IRGC's 27th Mohammad Rasulullah Division. He was killed in action on Majnoon Island during Operation Kheibar in 1984, at the age of 28.

Mohsen Rezaei said in an interview: "The first time someone was given the title of "Sayyid al-Shuhada" during the war was in Khaybar, for Hemat."

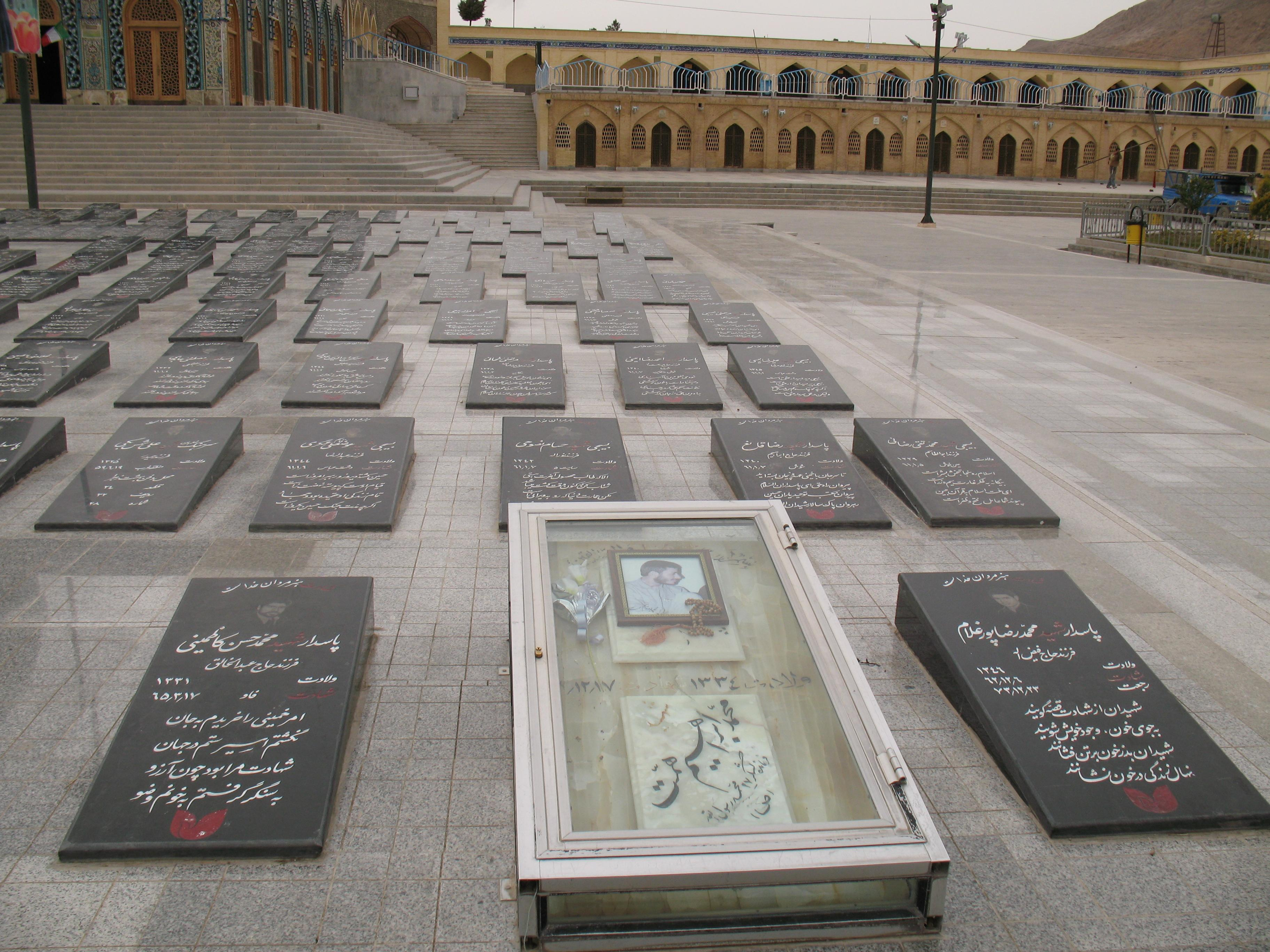
Hemmat's grave in Shahreza

== In popular culture ==
His picture was shown among many other people in Roger Waters The Wall in the ending credits.

== Legacy ==
He is remembered in Iran as a war hero and a prominent military figure in the Iran-Iraq War, as well as one of the IRGC's most prominent commanders in the war. The Hemmat Expressway, Shahid Hemmat Metro Station and Hemmat Underpass in Tehran are named after him. Insert

Several books have been written about Hemmat's personal life and military career, including Ham-Paye Saeqeh, Zarbat-e Moteqabel, Be Revayat-e Hemmat, Mah Balaye Sar-e Bachehast and Nimeh-ye Penhan-e Mah.

== See also ==
- Iranian leaders of the Iran–Iraq War
- Mehdi Bakeri
- Ali Hashemi
- Hassan Bagheri
