= 17th Ali ibn Abi Taleb Division =

- لشکر 17 علی ابن ابی طالب
- Country: Islamic Republic of Iran
- Branch: Basij
- Type: Infantry
- Size: Division
- Part of: Islamic Revolutionary Guard Corps
- Garrison/HQ: Qom province
- Nickname: "Ali ibn Abi Talib" (علی ابن ابی طالب)
- Engagements: Iran–Iraq War: Operation Tariq-ol-Qods; Operation Fath-ol-Mobin; Operation Beit-ol-Moqaddas; Operation Ramadan; Operation Before the Dawn; Operation Dawn 1; Operation Muharram; Operation Dawn 3; Operation Dawn 4; Operation Kheibar; Operation Badr; Operation Qader; First Battle of al-Faw; Operation Dawn 8; Operation Karbala 1; Operation Karbala 4; Operation Karbala 5; Operation Karbala 8; Operation Dawn 10; Operation Mersad; Operation Ashura 2; Syrian Civil War: Palmyra offensive (December 2016)

Commanders
- Commander in Chief: Governor-General Mohammad Aghamiri
- Notable commanders: Mehdi Zeinoddin

17th Ali ibn Abi Taleb Division (Persian: لشکر 17 علی ابن ابی طالب) was a division of the Islamic Revolutionary Guard Corps during the Iran–Iraq War. It covered Qom, Zanjan, Semnan, and Markazi provinces. Hussain Tanwar is now the commander of the 17th Division of Ali ibn Abi Talib.

After Operation Tariq-ol-Qods, the 17th Brigade of Qom (تیپ 17 قم) was established in the Shush area. Fighters were from Qom, Mashhad, Behbahan, and Shush. Its commander was initially Morteza Saffari, who later became the deputy of Fajr Headquarters and was replaced by Hassan Darvish. In July or August 1982, the brigade was renamed to 17th Ali ibn Abi Taleb Brigade (تیپ 17 علی ابن ابی طالب). Since then, forces from Zanjan, Semnan, Markazi provinces constituted the bulk of the unit. In the fourth phase of the Operation Ramadan, Mehdi Zeinoddin was appointed as the new commander of the brigade.

After Operation Muharram and the expansion of IRGC brigades, this unit was expanded to the 17th Ali ibn Abi Taleb Division. The division proved to be capable during the war. It played a major role in the initial successful stages of Operation Badr. From November 1984 to May 1988, Gholamreza Jaafari was its commander, after whom Mohammad Mirjani commanded the unit for two months. After Operation Dawn 10, commander of IRGC Ground Forces Ali Shamkhani separated and expanded the division into 17th Ali ibn Abi Taleb Division and a new 71st Roohollah Division (لشکر 71 روح الله) of Markazi Province. 12th Qaem Brigade of Semnan (تیپ 12 قائم) and Saheb-ol-Amr Brigade of Zanjan (تیپ صاحب‌الامر‌(عج)) were also later separated as new units.

== Sepah-e Ali bin Abu Taleb ==
The division was merged with the Basij of Qom province to form the Imam Ali ibn Abi Talib Corps of Qom Province during the rearrangement of the IRGC units in 2008.

== See also ==
- 15th Imam Hassan Brigade
- List of military units named after people
