= 27th Mohammad Rasulullah Division =

Former division of the Iranian IRGC

27th Mohammad Rasulollah Division
- لشکر ۲۷ محمد رسول‌الله (ص)
- Active: 1980s–2008 (field division); 2008–present (provincial corps)
- Country: Islamic Republic of Iran
- Branch: Islamic Revolutionary Guard Corps
- Type: Mechanized
- Size: Division
- Garrison/HQ: Tehran
- Nickname: "Muhammad Rasulullah" (محمد رسول‌الله (ص))
- Engagements: Iran–Iraq War; Operation Mohammad Rasulullah; Operation Fath ol-Mobin; Operation Beit ol-Moqaddas; Second Battle of Khorramshahr; Operation Ramadan; Operation Muslim ibn Aqil; Operation Zein-ol-Abedin; Operation Dawn-1; Operation Dawn-3; Operation Dawn-4; Operation Kheibar; Operation Badr; First Battle of al-Faw; Operation Dawn-8; Operation Karbala-1; Siege of Basra; Operation Karbala-8; Operation Nasr 7; Operation Beit ol-Moqaddas 7; 1982 Lebanon War

Commanders
- Commander in Chief: Mayor Alireza Zakani
- Deputy Commander: Sirous Saberi
- Deputy Coordinator: Hossein Dini
- Representative of the Supreme Leader: Mohammad Na’imi
- Notable commanders: Ahmad Motevasselian Reza Cheraghi; Mohammad Ebrahim Hemmat; Abbas Karimi; Dr.Mansour Haghdoust; Esmaeil Kousari; Hossein Hamadani Mohammad Ali Allahdadi

27th Mohammad Rasulullah Division (Persian: لشکر ۲۷ محمد رسول‌الله) is a division of the Islamic Revolutionary Guard Corps Ground Forces based in Tehran.

It was established as the 27th Mohammad Rasulullah Brigade by Hossein Qajeyi, Ahmad Motevasselian and Mohammad Ebrahim Hemmat during the Iran–Iraq War, and was expanded into a division just before Operation Jerusalem.

Describing the IRGC units during the Iran-Iraq war, then-commander-in-chief of IRGC Mohsen Rezaee says:

We had four divisions that, anywhere they went, no [Iraqi] military force was able to resist against them. Haj Hemmat and [his] 27th Mohammad Rasulullah Division, Hossein Kharrazi and [his] 14th Imam Hossein Division, Mehdi Bakeri and [his] 31st Ashura Division, Ahmad Kazemi and [his] 8th Najaf Division—which whenever they entered, it resulted in success without exception.

== Sepah-e Muhammad Rasoul Allah ==
The division was merged with the Basij of Tehran to form the Mohammad Rasulullah Corps of Greater Tehran during the rearrangement of the IRGC units in 2008. The Sepah-e Muhammad Rasoul Allah, the Sepah-e Sayyed al-Shohada and the Sepah-e Imam Hassan Mojtaba are controlled by the Sarallah Security Headquarters.

=== Operational forces ===
The Sepah-e Muhammad Rasoul Allah performs military missions through the 27th Mechanized Infantry Operational Division. The Division is a cadre formation, consisting of four battalions. For combat operations, the 27th Division and the 10th and 23rd divisions are augmented by twenty-four Basij Imam Hussein battalions and four Sabirin quick-reaction units.

Basij Imam Hussein battalions are staffed with full-time and salaried Basiji.

=== Security units ===
The metropolitan territory of Tehran is subdivided into 23 municipalities. In each Municipality there is a Basij Resistance District:

- 23 Basij Resistance Districts: each Basij Resistance District controls one Imam Ali Battalion, tasked with riot control and suppression.
- Basij Resistance Precincts: each Basij Resistance Precinct controls two all-male Beit al-Muqaddas Battalions and one all-female Kowsar Battalion. These part-time units are tasked with cultural and cyber operations, urban defense, and search-and-rescue/relief operations.
- Basij Resistance Bases: Basij Resistance Bases are scattered around neighborhoods in mosques, ministries, schools, and other sites. Within each Base, there are two all-male Ashura battalions and one all-female al-Zahra battalion. These units are tasked with cultural and cyber operations, urban defense, and search-and-rescue/relief operations but are staffed with personnel older than Beit al-Muqaddas and all-female Kowsar Battalions.
- 4 Basij Special Forces Fatehin Battalions.

When deployed, they answer directly to the provincial corps and operate under four citywide IRGC security units:

- Valiasr;
- Hazrat-e Mojtaba;
- Imam Hadi;
- Imam Reza.

These units in turn report to Hazrat-e Zahra and All-e Muhammad brigades, attached to the Sepah-e Muhammad Rasoul Allah.

=== Other units ===
Tehran's cultural terrain is monitored by Sepah-e Muhammad Rasoul Allah's "Cyberspace Cultural Operations Battalions".

== See also ==
- Sar-Allah Headquarters
