= Operation Ashura (Iran) =

- Part of Iran–Iraq War
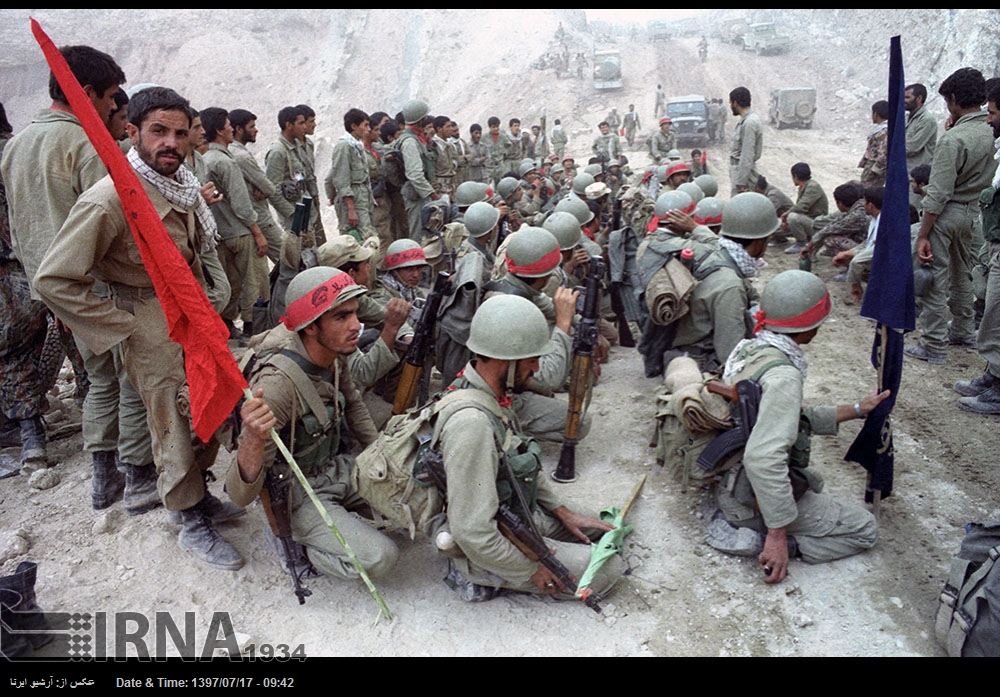
- Iranian soldiers preparing to enter combat during Operation Ashura
| Date | 17 October 1984 (4 days) |
| Location | Meymak, Ilam province |
| Result | Iranian victory |
| Territorial changes | Iran recaptures 50 sq.km of occupied territory |

Belligerents
| Iraq | Iran |

Units involved
| Iraqi Army | Islamic Revolutionary Guard Corps |

Casualties and losses
| Unknown | Unknown |

Operation Ashura (Persian: عملیات عاشورا) is a military operation during Iran–Iraq War which was launched on 17 October 1984 by Islamic Revolutionary Guard Corps and Islamic Republic of Iran Army against the army of Iraq. The military code of this operation was "Ya Aba Abdullah Al-Hussein (A.S.)" [Persian: (یااباعبدالله‌الحسین(ع], and ultimately the operation led to the recapture of more than 50 square kilometers of occupied areas in Ilam province, Iran.

Twelve days before the official start of the Iran–Iraq War, on September 10, 1980, Iraqi Ba'athist army entered Ilam province and occupied the Meymak area. As a result of Ashura-operation, Iran took back fifty square-kilometers of the area. Among the spoils of war captured by Iran, are as follows:

4 tanks, 7 vehicles, 6 106 mm rifles, 29 mortars and a large number of small arms and ammunition from the Iraqi army.

== See also ==
- Operation Dawn 3
- Operation Karbala 1
- Operation Dawn 1
- Operation Muharram
- Operation Forty Stars
