= Hossein Qajeyi =

Iranian military commander

The martyr commander Hossein Qajeyi
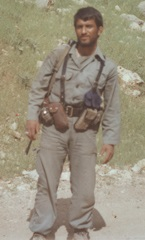
- Born: 5 September 1958; Zarrin Shahr, Lenjan County, Isfahan, Imperial State of Iran
- Died: 5 May 1982 (aged 23); Khorramshahr, Khuzestan Province, Iran
- Military career
- Allegiance: Iran
- Branch: Imperial Iranian Army (1974–1977); Revolutionary Guards (1979–1982)
- Service years: 1974–1982
- Rank: None; Major General (posthumously)
- Unit: 27th Mohammad Rasulullah Division
- Commands: Marivan Artillery Commander; IRGC commander in Dezli, Marivan; 27th Mohammad Rasulullah Division; Salman Battalion
- Conflicts: 1979 Kurdish Rebellion; Iran–Iraq War; Operation Tariq al-Qods; Operation Fath ol-Mobin; Operation Beit ol-Moqaddas; Second Battle of Khorramshahr †
- Awards: Order of Fath

Hossein Qajeyi (born September 5, 1958 – May 5, 1982) was an Iranian military officer and prominent military figure in the Iran–Iraq War. He was the founder of the IRGC's 27th Mohammad Rasulullah Division and served as the division's first commander during the war.

== Early life and political career ==
Hossein Qajeyi was born in Zarrinshahr, Isfahan Province. He continued his elementary education and received his high school diploma in his hometown and then he went to military service. His political activity began at the age of sixteen in the year 1974. In 1977, he emigrated to Qom after he was wanted by the authorities for his dissident activities against the Shah. While in Qom, he was caught and arrested by SAVAK agents. Following his release, he joined the Iranian Revolution and participated in revolutionary activities in several cities across Iran like Shiraz and in his hometown, Zarrin Shahr.

== Military career ==
Following the success of the Iranian Revolution, Qajeyi joined the Islamic Revolution Committee, a law enforcement agency and religious police force that was formed to safeguard the nascent revolutionary government in Iran and counter anti-governmental elements within the country. Qajeyi later joined the Islamic Revolutionary Guard Corps (IRGC) during the 1979 Kurdish rebellion and becoming a commander, commanding several IRGC units and brigades in the Kurdistan Province. During the Iran-Iraq War, he founded the 27th Mohammad Rasulullah Division and became the commander of the Salman Battalion within the division. He had participated in several battles and operations during the first phases of the war.

== Death ==
During the Second Battle of Khorramshahr, Qajeyi's battalion succeeded in repelling a heavy counterattack from two armored and mechanized brigades of the Iraqi Army on the Ahvaz-Khorramshahr road. After the three days of fierce fighting, most of the soldiers in the Salman Battalion and Qajeyi were killed. The battle took place on May 5, 1982. His body was buried in his hometown of Zarrin Shahr in the Golestan-e Shohada cemetery.

== Legacy ==
Iranian historians believe that the three-day resistance by the Salman Battalion under the command of Hossein Qajeyi, against the Iraqi counterattack, during the Second Battle of Khorramshahr, was key to liberating Khorramshahr.

== Personal life ==
Qajeyi was also a freestyle wrestler, serving in the lightweight categories. Some of his achievements was winning the Youth Wrestling Championship in Iran for three years and winning in his home province of Isfahan for four years.

== Books written about him ==
- Kash Ou Ra Mishenakh'tam By Ahmadreza Madhi (the book ts written in Persian and its title means "I wish I knew him")
- Mesle Khodash By Ali Hashemi (the book is written in Persian and its title means "Like himself")
- Al'an Vaght-e Esterahat Nist By Ahmadreza Madhi (the book is written in Persian and its title means "Now is not the time to rest")

== See also ==
- List of Iranian commanders in the Iran–Iraq War
- Mohsen Vezvaei
- Basij
- Operation Beit ol-Moqaddas
- Operation Tariq al-Qods
