= Morteza Avini =

Iranian documentary filmmaker, author, and theoretician

Sardar Jahadgar Shahid Morteza Avini
- سید مرتضی آوینی
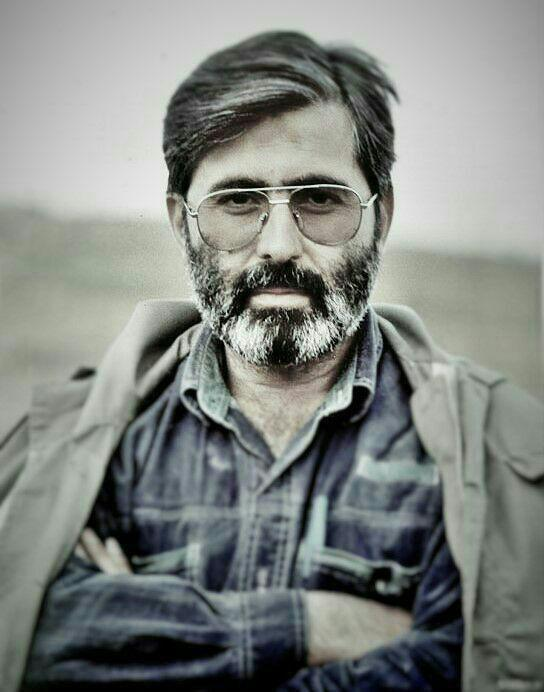
- Born: 23 September 1947; Rey, Iran
- Died: 9 April 1993 (aged 45); Fakkeh, Iran
- Education: University of Tehran
- Occupations: Film director, author, photographer
- Organization: Jihad TV Unit (part of Jihad of Construction)
- Notable work: Ravayat-e Fath documentary film
- Television: Ravayat-e Fath
- Spouse: Maryam Amini (m. 1982)

Sayyid Morteza Avini (Persian: سید مرتضی آوینی; also spelled Aviny; 23 September 1947 – 9 April 1993) was an Iranian documentary filmmaker, author, and theoretician of "Islamic Cinema." He studied Architecture at Tehran University in 1965. During the Iranian Revolution, Avini started his artistic career as a director of documentary films, and is considered a prominent war filmmaker. He made over 80 films on the Iran–Iraq War. According to Agnes Devictor, Avini invented original cinematography methods, depicting the esoteric side of the Iran–Iraq War in terms of Shia mystical thought. Most of his work was devoted to reflecting on how bassijis, a paramilitary volunteer militia within the Islamic Revolutionary Guard Corps, perceived the war and their role in it. His most famous work is the documentary series Ravayat-e Fath (Narration of Victory), which was filmed during the Iran–Iraq War. He was killed by a landmine explosion in 1993, while filming. He was described as a Shahid (martyr) after his death, and Ayatollah Ali Khamenei declared him "the master of martyred literati" (Persian: سید شهیدان اهل قلم). The 20th day of Farvardin is entitled the day of "Islamic Revolution art" in his honor.

== Early life and education ==
Avini was born in 1947 in the city of Rey, south of Tehran, to a middle-class Muslim family that was not particularly religious. He attended elementary and secondary school in Zanjan, Kerman, and Tehran. Avini entered university in 1965, earning a master's degree in architecture from Tehran University.

Massoud Behnoud described Avini's lifestyle during the period he was studying in Tehran in the following manner: "for a period he became a hipster. He grew his hair long and started wearing jeans, bracelets." Behnoud went on to argue that Avini's lifestyle had changed after 1978, when Avini became interested in literature and spiritual matters. Avini's friends and classmates later said that his lifestyle and personal beliefs had changed after the 1979 Iranian Revolution.

Shahrzad Beheshti, one of Avini's friends during his time at the university, later said that "Avini was a very different person before and after the revolution." After the revolution, Avini gave up writing and burned all his writings with the stated intention of annihilating his "self." After the revolution, Avini was introduced to Ayatollah Khomeini's ideology. He was described as a follower, but not a close disciple, of Khomeini.

== Artistic work ==
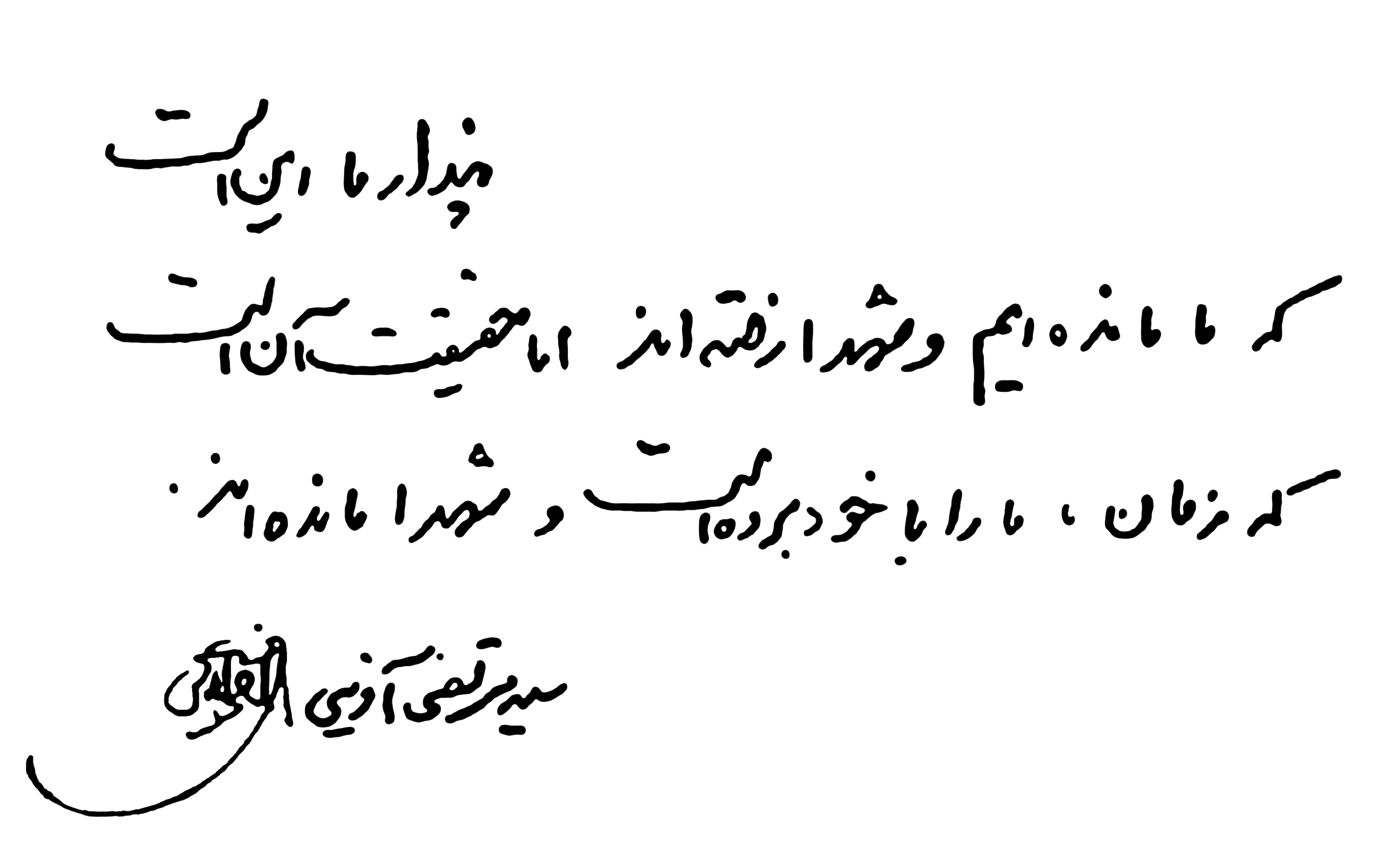
Avini's signed handwriting, which reads: "We hold the illusion that we've stayed but the martyrs have passed. But the truth is that time has taken us away with itself, but the martyrs have stayed."

According to Agnes Devictor, a professor at the Sorbonne who specializes in Iranian cinema, Avini chose to participate in the Iranian Revolution by making documentary films, instead of entering politics as many of his colleagues did, and which he was capable of doing. Afterwards, he joined the television team of Construction Jihad. His film-making has been described as having an ideological goal. He was the head of Jihad Television Unit, a documentary film unit co-sponsored both by IRIB channel 1 and Construction Jihad. According to Avini, his position was "suspended" between the two institutions, and if not for that, none of the films would have been created. Avini made over 80 films on the Iran–Iraq War, and is considered a major contributor to the documentation of the war. During the war and in particular the battle of Khorramshahr, Avini decided to record the events and make promotional films.

=== Style ===
Reviewer Kamran Rastegar described Avini's work as melding "documentary techniques and ideological aims." His films rarely mention the national identity of the enemies in a battle, and instead explore the actions of young Iranian soldiers in comparison to the actions of historical Shi'a "martyrs." According to Devictor, Avini created an original cinematic approach which was neither strictly realistic nor glorifying. Instead, Avini tried to capture both the visible (military operations) and the esoteric (the inner or moral) aspects of battle. He overlaid these with Shia mystic philosophy, and invited the viewer to develop a personal place within the event. In discussing the nature of authorship in his films, Avini says: "Of course anything that an author writes emanates from inside. All arts are this way. Likewise, a film is the result of the filmmaker's inspiration. However, if one entirely immerses oneself in God, then God will inspire in his works and appear in them. That is my goal, not my claim."

"Filming something differently" was the editorial policy of Avini in his documentary series. He worked with a crew of young amateur volunteers. As he had based his works on the break with the imperial past, he could not work with a team formed under the Mohammad Reza Shah or use older Iranian television methods, which drew from American styles.

Avini has stated that his film crews tried to avoid the "sloppy fakery" of most TV News reports. He had his teams stay at the set for long periods of time, taking the time to discover and encounter "the other." He tried to maintain realism by minimizing the use of cinematic effects, and worked to avoid depicting the habits that combatants had adopted when they were being filmed. Avini rarely filmed major victories and was hardly interested in strategy or military issues; his documentaries were almost exclusively devoted to how volunteers (bassijis) viewed the conflict and their participation in it.

=== Ravayat-e Fath ===
Ravayat-e Fath (Narration of Victory) was a "lifelong" documentary of the Iran–Iraq War which focused on the daily life of Iranian soldiers. It consisted of five series and dealt with the spiritual aspect of the war. It depicted "a lifetime spiritual experience" through its ideological narration.

== Theoretical works ==
He wrote a series of articles in Sureh magazine critiquing Western civilization, a subject which was later the focus of his film Sarab (Mirage).

According to Devictor, Avini was an intellectual and theorist who worked on reconciling the Iranian Islamic regime with political and aesthetic modernity. Avini's work had similarities to that of 19th century thinkers in the Muslim world who felt it was necessary to employ Western political, economic, or cultural techniques in the service of spiritual art. However, Avini said that artists needed to be able to subdue what he described as the profane nature of modern techniques to use them in spiritual revolutionary art. At a conference at the Ministry of Culture and Islamic Guidance, he said that Western art was a container that could accept any content, and that it was possible to insert religious thought without changing or betraying it.

== Death and legacy ==
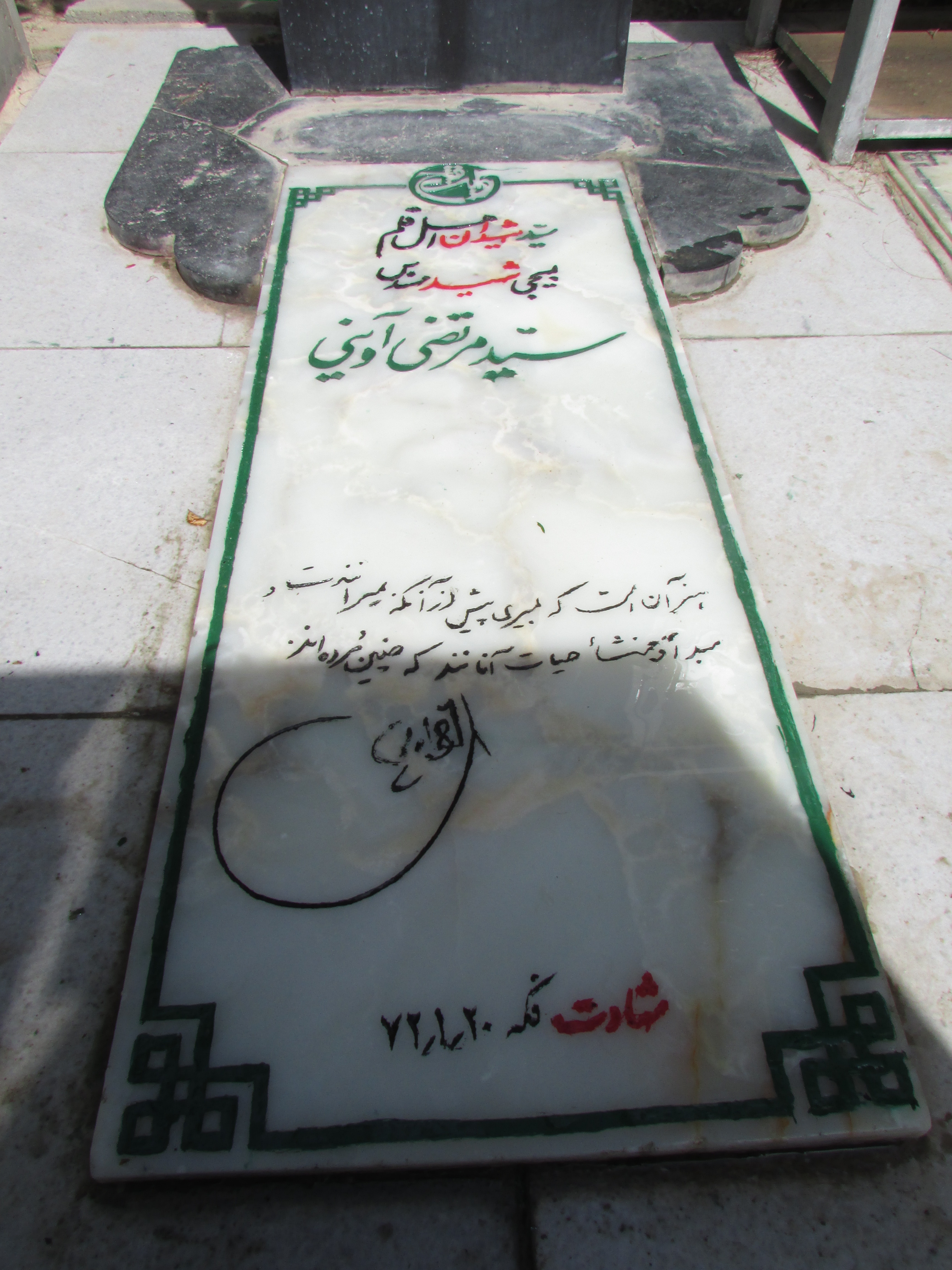
Morteza Avini's grave stone.

Avini was killed by shrapnel from a landmine explosion in Fakkeh, in northwest Khuzestan Province, on 9 April 1993, while producing a documentary. He was dubbed a shahid, or "martyr," after his death. Ayatollah Ali Khamenei, the Supreme Leader of Iran, described him as "the master of martyred literati" (Persian: سید شهیدان اهل قلم) on the 20th day of Farvardin, which was declared the day of "Islamic Revolution art" on the Iranian calendar.

== Selected films ==
Title	Year	Genre	Episodes
Six Days in Turkmensahra	1979	documentary	
Khuzestan Flood	1979	documentary	
The Bitten by the Khan	1980	documentary	6 episodes
The Reward of Jihad and Martyrdom	1981	documentary	3 episodes
The Victory of Blood	1981	documentary	3 episodes
Truth	1981	documentary	11 episodes
With the Doctor of Jihad in Bashagerd	1981	documentary	
Seven Stories of Balochistan	1981	documentary	7 episodes
Qiamollah	1982	documentary	
Salavati Economy	1982	documentary	6 episodes
The Lion Men of God	1983	documentary	4 episodes
Brave men! Karbala is Waiting	1983	documentary	
Karbala, War, People	1984	documentary	3 episodes
With Al'Mahdi Brigade at the Head of Albysheh Axis	1985	documentary	
The Special Program of ValFajr 8	1987	documentary	
Narration of Victory	1985~1988	documentary	63 episodes
Elegy	1988	documentary	2 episodes
America, Deception, Rape	1988	documentary	
The Breeze of Life, Fragrance of Islamic Revolution in Lebanon	1988	documentary	13 episodes
The Herald of Affections	1989	documentary	7 episodes
It Can't Be Said, the Separation of a Friend	1989	documentary	2 episodes
Stone Revolution	1989	documentary	6 episodes
Talk to Me DoKoohe	1989	documentary	2 episodes
Mirage	1990	documentary	17 episodes
Three Generations of Runabout	1992	documentary	3 episodes
A City in the Sky	1992	documentary	6 episodes

== Bibliography ==
Title	Year	Source
Magic Mirror – Volume I	1998	
Magic Mirror – Volume II	1998	
Magic Mirror – Volume III	1999	
The Beginning of an End	1999	
Imam and the Inner Life of Human	1999	
The Rupture of Form	2009	
Talk to Me DoKoohe	2001	
The Observatory of Mysteries	2012	
Development and Foundations of Western Civilization	1997	
The Homeless Snails	2000	
The Resurrection of Life	2000	
Travel to the Land of Light	2005	
A City in the Sky	2005	
The Victory of Blood	2000	
Another Tomorrow	1999	
The Heavenly Treasures	1997	
The Center of Sky	2001	
The Breeze of Life	2005	

== See also ==
- Sacred Defense Cinema
- Culture of Iran
- Islamic art
- Iranian art
- Iranian art and architecture
- List of Iranian artists
- Martyr Avini Literary Award
- Occidentalism
