= 1982 kidnapping of Iranian diplomats =

Unsolved kidnapping incident during the Lebanese Civil War

Iranian diplomats kidnapping (1982)
- Part of 1982 Lebanon War and Lebanese Civil War
- Date: 4 July 1982
- Location: El Berbara, Lebanon
- Missing: Ahmad Motevaselian; Seyed Mohsen Mousavi; Taghi Rastegar Moghadam; Kazem Akhavan
- Inquiries: Lebanese government Iranian government Sayyed Raed Mousavi; Nazih Mansour
- Suspects: Lebanese Forces
- Accused: Lebanese Forces

Three Iranian diplomats as well as a reporter for Islamic Republic News Agency (IRNA) were abducted in Lebanon on 4 July 1982. None of them have been seen since. The missing individuals are Ahmad Motevaselian, (an attache for the Iranian embassy in Beirut); Seyed Mohsen Mousavi, (the chargé d'affaires at the Iranian embassy); Taghi Rastegar Moghadam (who was an Iranian embassy employee), and Kazem Akhavan, IRNA photojournalist. Motevaselian was also an Islamic Revolutionary Guard Corps (IRGC) member in command of an Iranian expeditionary force in Lebanon.

They were stopped at a checkpoint in northern Lebanon by the Lebanese Forces commanded by Samir Geagea. Speculation about their fate has circulated since their abduction. Iranian officials believe that they were handed over to Israel after they were kidnapped and are still alive and being held in Israeli territory. Israel said that the diplomats were captured by militia under Elie Hobeika. The Israeli newspaper Haaretz said that the diplomats were believed to be executed by Phalange shortly after their abduction. Geagea as well as Hobeika's bodyguard Robert Hatem also said that they were executed while under the Phalange's custody.

The diplomats' disappearance is regularly commemorated in Iran. Both the Iranian and Lebanese governments have tried to gain information about their whereabouts. According to Nazih Mansour, former member of the Lebanese parliament, the case has turned into a political issue, rather than a judicial one since some of the involved people such as Samir Geagea have become political figures.

== Background ==
During the 1982 Israeli invasion of Lebanon, Ahmad Motevaselian, a military attaché for Iran's embassy in Beirut; Seyed Mohsen Mousavi, chargé d'affaires at the embassy; and Taghi Rastegar Moghadam, an embassy employee, were sent on diplomatic mission to Lebanon along with Kazem Akhavan, an IRNA photojournalist covering the events in Lebanon.

Ahmad Motevaselian was the best-known of the abductees because of his service in the Iran–Iraq War. The 27th Mohammad Rasoul-Allah Brigade, under his command, played an important role in Liberation of Khorramshahr, a "turning point" in the war. According to the US State Department and Jerusalem Center for Public Affairs, Motevaselian was in command of the IRGC expeditionary force supporting Shia militias like Hezbollah in Southern Lebanon and the Bekaa Valley to fight against the Israeli invasion. According to Mohsen Rezai, currently secretary of the Expediency Council, he had been chosen to lead the Iranian expeditionary force in Lebanon because of his success in crushing the 1979 Kurdish rebellion in Iran.

Lebanese Phalanges Party was a Christian militia operating in Lebanon at the time, allied to Israel. Israeli–Phalange relations began 1948 and reached its climax in mid-1970s. At the time of the kidnapping, Israel was besieging west of Beirut.

== Kidnapping ==
Amid the Israeli invasion of Lebanon in 1982, the four Iranian diplomats were traveling from Iran's embassy in Damascus to Beirut. On the highway between Jounieh and Beirut, after reaching the El Berbara checkpoint in northern Mount Lebanon, Lebanese Phalange forces headed by Samir Geagea stopped and detained the diplomats. According to the Rai al-Youm on-line newspaper, Biar Rizq, known as "Akram", and Abdeh Raji, known as "Captain", were involved in the abduction, with the latter commanding the checkpoint.

According to Lebanese judiciary sources, the abducted individuals were imprisoned under the supervision of Elie Hobeika, then a Phalangist, in Karantina, Beirut for 20 days and were moved to the Adonis prison in Beirut.

== Fate of abducted diplomats ==
=== Israeli detention speculation ===
In the aftermath of the incident, Iran accused Israel of kidnapping and holding the diplomats in their jails, and called on the International Committee of the Red Cross (ICRC) to clarify their whereabouts. In November 1994, Iranian ambassador in Lebanon, Homayoun Alizadeh, said that the four abductees were held alive in Israeli prisons. Similarly, Ghazanfar Roknabadi, former Iranian ambassador in Lebanon, said that there were "concrete evidences" proving that they were alive, held in Israel. The assertion was repeated years later by Hassan Nasrallah, the leader of Lebanon's Hezbollah resistance movement, Mahmoud Ahmadinejad, Iran's ex-president, and Iran's Defense Minister Brig. Gen. Hossein Dehghan. The Iranian Parliament speaker's senior advisor in July 2017 argued that the kidnapped Iranian diplomats are in Tel Aviv's prison and have not been killed, according to the Tehran Times.

In 1997 the Prisoners' Friends Association, an Israel-based prisoners' aid organization, said that a released prisoner had seen the four disappeared Iranians in Atlit Prison in Israel two years previously, which was denied by a spokesman for the Israeli Prime Minister. Israel has said it does not know what happened to the diplomats and that it believes that they were kidnapped by a Lebanese militant group and executed shortly after their abduction. According to the Iranian Fars News Agency, Israel has made contradictory comments on the issue by rejecting the allegation of diplomats being surrendered to it, and saying that they are already dead. Elie Hobeika had an interview with the London-based Al-Wasat magazine which was published on 31 August 1997. The Islamic Republic of Iran Broadcasting (IRIB) said that the interview substantiated the abduction of the diplomats and their handing over to Israel by Geagea's group. The group was known for its close ties with Israel and for handing over many Lebanese and foreigners to Israel during its invasion of Lebanon.

Later in 2016, according to a report by the London-based pan-Arab daily Rai al-Youm, translated to English by Fars News Agency, a recently released Greek prisoner from Israeli jails informed the Iranian embassy in Athens that he had seen the four abducted individuals alive in Israeli jails. The report also said that Ahmad Habibollah Abu Hesham, known as a "spiritual father" of prisoners of Israeli jails, had made a similar comment that Motavesellian and the others were alive in Atlit detainee camp after visiting and inspecting prisoners in Israeli jails. Abu Hesham died in what Rai al-Youm said was a "made up accident by Israel."

However, Israel has rejected the allegation of detaining the Iranian diplomats and journalist who were abducted in Lebanon, according to Reuters report.

=== Death speculation ===
According to Geagea, the Iranians died some time after their capture. Robert Hatem, code-named "Cobra", Hobeika's security chief in the early 1980s, said that Hobeika was responsible for the diplomats' "kidnapping and murder". According to Ronen Bergman in his book The Secret War with Iran, Hatem told Israeli agents in 1993 and 2000 that he himself had probably killed at least one of the Iranians, Ahmad Motevasselian, and that he could clearly remember the Iranians' execution. Hatem is described as sketching the electrical torture tool for the Iranians. "Right at the beginning, we found that one of them spoke Arabic. I don't know why but they killed him right away," said Hatem according to Bergman. The Israeli newspaper Haaretz said that it was believed that they were then buried at a site where construction later obliterated their graves.

Ali Qusair, a journalist from the Iranian-based Press TV and Sayyed Raed Mousavi, son of the kidnapped Sayyed Mohsen Mousavi, discussed the diplomats' fate in an interview with Karim Pakradouni, former head of Phalangists. Referring to his conversation with Assaad Chaftari, a senior intelligence official of Lebanese Forces, Pakradouni believed that the abducted diplomats could have been killed before reaching Karantina.

== Political response ==
In 2016, Adnan Mansour, the Lebanese ex-minister of foreign affairs and emigrants and ex-ambassador to Iran, stated that Iran and Lebanon had not stopped investigating the fate of the diplomats. He stated that the first responsibility lies with the Lebanese side, because the abduction had occurred in Lebanese territory. Nazih Mansour, former member of the Lebanese parliament, had been the official lawyer of one of the families. Speaking to IRNA, he said that the progress of the case in Lebanese courts was very slow. Mansour also said that after so many years, the case had turned into a political issue rather than a judicial one.

In 2014 Mohammad Fathali, Iranian Ambassador to Beirut, said that Iran had seen no serious action by the international community and human rights bodies regarding the abduction of the Iranian diplomats in Lebanon and their fate. In a statement issued in 2015, Iran expressed appreciation for efforts by the Lebanese government and international figures, including a 2008 letter from Lebanon to the UN confirming the abduction, to bring international attention to this case. In July 2018, at the 36th anniversary commemoration of the kidnapping, Iran's Foreign Ministry pointed out that there was sufficient proof that the kidnapped Iranian diplomats were moved to Israel, according to Mehr News.

Hezbollah had included the fate of the diplomats in indirect negotiations for a prisoner exchange with the Israelis after the 2006 war and in the 2008 Israel–Hezbollah prisoner exchange agreement, Israel agreed to give a report on the fate of the four Iranians. The report stated that the four were captured by a group of Christian militia led by Elie Hobeika, who was later murdered in 2002. According to Fars News, during the 37th anniversary ceremony held in Lebanon to commemorate the kidnapped Iranian diplomats, the senior advisor to the Iran Parliament Speaker divulged that Iran and Lebanon would prolong their association in order to solve the case of the abducted Iranian diplomats.

According to the Middle East Monitor, the Iranian Defence Minister Hossein Dehghan urged Israel to answer for the security and safety of the four abducted Iranian diplomats.

== Commemoration ==
The disappearance of the abducted diplomats is annually commemorated in Iran.

== See also ==
- List of extrajudicial killings and political violence in Lebanon
- 2013 Iranian diplomat kidnapping
- List of kidnappings
- List of people who disappeared mysteriously: post-1970
- Lebanese Civil War
- Attack on the Iranian Embassy in London (2018)
