= Martyr Avini Literary Award =

Martyr Avini Literary Award is an Iranian literary award organized by the Revayat-e Fath Publication Institute and the Marty Avini Institute of Culture and Art. The award is named in honor of Haj Sayyed Morteza Aviny (or Shahid Aviny), who is considered a martyr in Iran. He was a well known Iranian television news personality who was killed in 1993 by a mine while covering a story about the Iran-Iraq conflict.

The award is presented in the following six categories; one book is selected as the 'Resistance Book of the Year':

- Documentary literature (memories, reports, biographies, wills, interview)
- Poetry (including all poetry styles)
- Fiction literature (novels, long stories, short stories, fiction biographies)
- Research literature and criticism (works on culture, literature, politics and society)
- Soft War (cultural invasions and threats, national security, propaganda, psychological war and operations)
- Arts (pictures, plays, screenplays, and visual arts)

In 2012, for the first award, 18,000 books published in 2009 and 2010 were considered, of which 1720 were selected to be scrutinized by the judges with a final shortlist of 380.

The second award, for books published in 2012, was planned to assess works on the subject of resistance. It was to be international, open to books published in Arabic, Urdu, Turkish, French and English.
