= Seyed Mohsen Mousavi =

Iranian diplomat (??–c.1982)

Seyed Mohsen Mousavi (Persian: سید محسن موسوی) was one of the four Iranian diplomats who disappeared in north Lebanon on 4 July 1982. His fate was never determined and he is presumed dead. It is speculated that they were captured by Lebanese Forces. In 2016, Iran accused Israel of being involved in his disappearance.

== See also ==
- Ahmad Motevaselian
- 1982 kidnapping of Iranian diplomats
- List of kidnappings
- List of people who disappeared mysteriously (1980s)
