= Ravayat-e Fath =

- The logo of Ravayat-e Fath television series designed by Reza Abedini.
- روایت فتح
- Genre: War documentary film
- Directed by: Morteza Avini
- Narrated by: Morteza Avini
- Country of origin: Iran
- Original language: Persian
- No. of seasons: 5

Production
- Production location: Iran–Iraq War front lines

Original release
- Network: IRIB 1

Related
- The Truth (Persian: حقیقت Haghighat)

Ravayat-e Fath (Persian: روایت فتح), variously translated as The Chronicles of Victory, The Tales of Victory, The Narrative of Victory, The Narration of Victory, The Story of Victory, and Witness to Glory, was an Iranian war documentary television series directed by Morteza Avini and filmed on the front lines of the Iran–Iraq War of the 1980s. It is one of Avini's most famous works, and one of the first and most important war documentary films in Iranian cinema. The series presents witnessing discourse through footage of front-line sacrifices set against commentary by Avini. The documentary film "literally brought the details of war into people's living rooms every night". The series had a mystic and spiritual theme.

After the Iraqi invasion of Iran, Avini went to the front-line, founded Jihad TV Unit (Persian: گروه تلویزیونی جهاد), and trained its crewmembers ideologically and technically. At least seven Jihad TV crew members, including Avini himself, were killed in the process of making the series. Jihad TV continued to operate as a production unit for years after the war and after Avini. According to Hamid Naficy, what made the documentary series stand out was "its promotion of multiple sacred subjectivities on behalf of the warriors who were filmed, the cameramen who filmed them, and the spectators who watched them".

== Seasons ==
Season One, consisted of 11 episodes, is about Operation Dawn 8 (First Battle of al-Faw).

Season Two depicts Battle of Mehran and Operation Karbala 1.

Season Three depicts Operation Karbala 5, filmed in Shalamcheh. Three crewmembers were killed in the process of filming this season.

Season Four, beside covering the front-line events, depicts the political situation in 1987, including the American activities in the Persian Gulf and the Mecca incident.

Season Five was broadcast after the end of the war, and depicts other wartime Iranian operations including Operation Karbala 10, Operation Mersad, and several operations in the Western Front.
