= Mohsen Vezvaei =

Iranian military officer

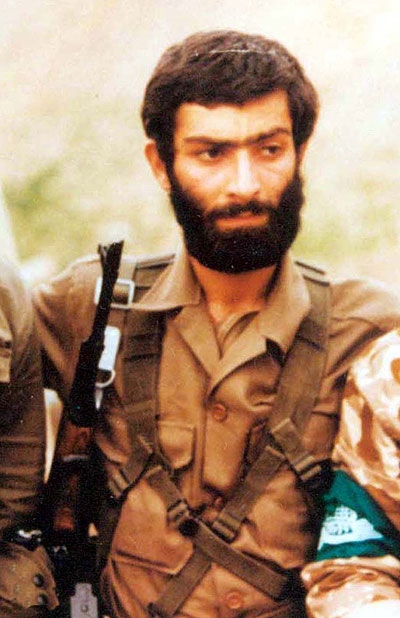

Deputy commander of the 27th Mohammad Rasulullah Division of the Islamic Revolutionary Guard Corps

Personal details
- Born: July 29, 1960 Tehran, Imperial State of Iran
- Died: April 30, 1982 (aged 21) Khuzestan Province, Iran
- Resting place: Behesht-e Zahra, Tehran

Military service
- Allegiance: Islamic Republic of Iran
- Branch/service: Islamic Revolutionary Guard Corps
- Rank: Major-General
- Commands: 27th Mohammad Rasulullah Division
- Battles/wars: Iran–Iraq War; Operation Beit ol-Moqaddas †

Major General Mohsen Vezvaei (Persian: محسن وزوایی ; 29 July 1960 – 30 April 1982) was an Iranian military officer in the Islamic Revolutionary Guard Corps (IRGC) and military figure in the Iran-Iraq War. He was also involved in street protests against the Shah of Iran, and later participated in the 1979 Iranian hostage crisis.

== Early life and education ==
Vezvaei was born in 1960 in Tehran. He achieved third place in the Iranian University Entrance Exam and was admitted to Sharif University to study chemical engineering in 1976. Before the Islamic Revolution he joined the same opposition groups as his father. His father was associated with Abol-Ghasem Kashani, was politically active and had always resisted the Pahlavi dynasty.

== Iranian Revolution ==
When a branch of Anjoman-e Eslami (Islamic Association of Students) was established at Sharif University, Vezvaei joined the branch and later became the head of opposition groups at the university. He actively participated in anti-regime protests. He also participated in armed clashes and helped with the occupation of the Eshratabad and Jamshidieh garrisons. Following the victory of the Iranian Revolution, he was a member of Jahad-e Sazandegi and went to Lorestan Province to serve. He was a member of Muslim Student Followers of the Imam's Line, an Iranian student group that took over the U.S. embassy in Tehran on 4 November 1979. This occupation caused the hostage crisis where 52 American diplomats were held hostage for 444 days. He was the Muslim Student Followers of the Imam's Line's translator and did interviews with foreign media.

== Zdf channel's interview with Vezvaei ==
The following is a part of Zdf channel's interview with Vezvaei:

We also are familiar with the laws and diplomatic affairs. We know the safety of diplomats in foreign countries. Furthermore, our Islamic laws recommend us to deal appropriately with guests, but unfortunately here was not an embassy, and these men were not diplomats. Maybe you do not believe but after six month of revolution we found that most of the plots were started from here. ... and it's my question, if here is an embassy why have these complex systems of surveillance and intelligence been installed here and have they destroyed large amount of documents by shredders?

== Military career and the Iran–Iraq War ==
In 1979, Vezvaei joined the Islamic Revolutionary Guard Corps, was appointed commander of the Army Signal Corps and then supervisor of the IRGC Army Intelligence Unit.

When the Iran–Iraq War began, he deployed to the front line, serving in the Bazi Deraz Mountains. During the war he became one of the most prominent commanders in the IRGC. He also participated in several operations in the war such as the Operation Beit ol-Moqaddas. Vezvaei and his companions captured 350 members of the Iraqi Commando Battalion with very few men. He was wounded multiple times during the war.

== Death ==
Vezvaei was killed in action during Operation Beit ol-Moqaddas, on 30 April 1982 . He was buried at the Behesht-e Zahra cemetery in Tehran.

He once said: "If you found my corpse, throw it over mines ... maybe at least my corpse helps the Islamic government."

== Bibliography ==
- Hampaye Saeghe (Along with Lightning)
- Ghoghnoose Fateh (The Phoenix Won)
- Oghabane Bazi Deraz (Eagles of Bazi Deraz)

== See also ==
- Iran–Iraq War
- List of Iranian commanders in the Iran–Iraq War
