= Morteza Saffari =

Iranian admiral

- مرتضی صفاری
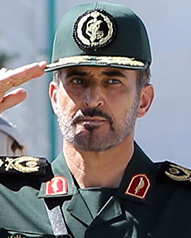
- General Saffari in 2017
- Military career
- Allegiance: Iran
- Branch: IRGC
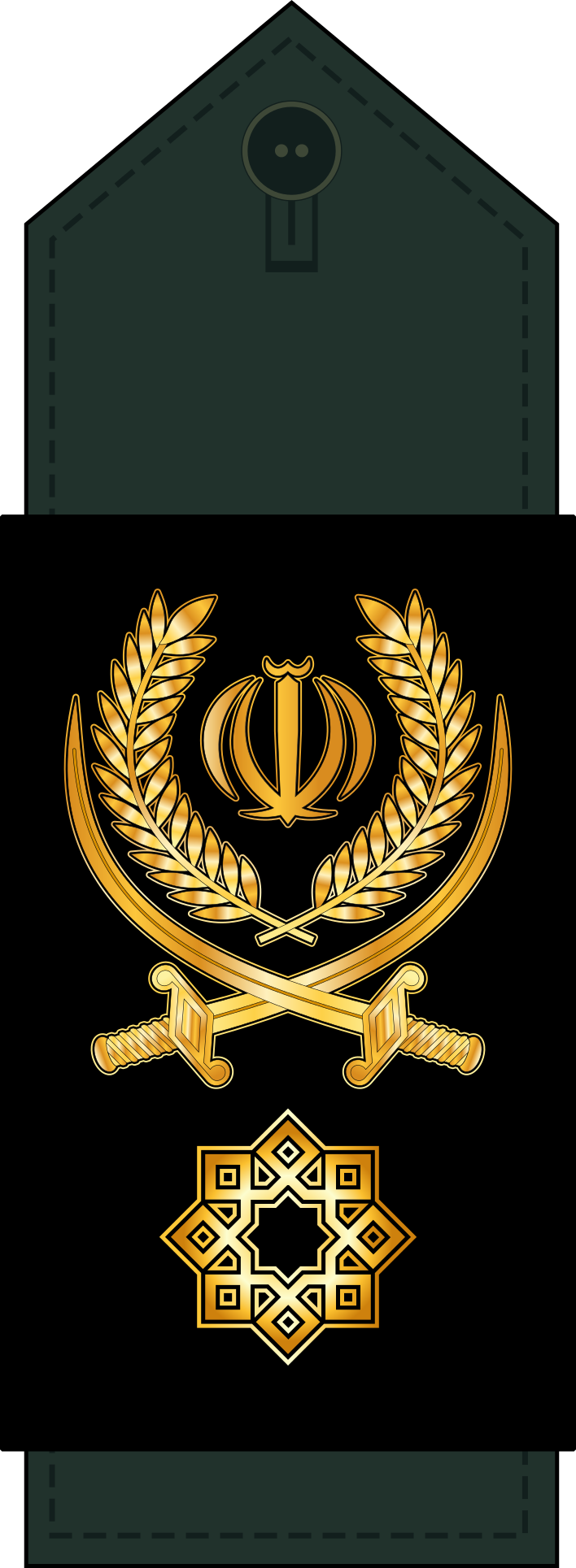
- Rank: Commodore
- Commands: Deputy of Supervision and Field Evaluation at the Khatam al-Anbiya Central Headquarters (2018–Present); Guards Officer Training of Imam Hossein University (2010–2018); IRGC Navy (2000–2010); 17th Ali ibn Abi Taleb Division (1981–1982)
- Conflicts: Iran–Iraq War; 2004 Iranian seizure of Royal Navy personnel; 2007 Iranian arrest of Royal Navy personnel; 2008 Iran–United States naval dispute; Twelve-Day War; 2026 Iran war

Morteza Saffari (Persian: مرتضی صفاری) is an admiral in the Islamic Revolutionary Guard Corps, who currently serves as the deputy head of the Khatam al-Anbiya Central Headquarters for Supervision and Evaluation.

He was a member of the Islamic Revolutionary Guard Corps during the Iran–Iraq War. Saffari served as the commander of the Islamic Revolutionary Guard Corps Navy from 2000 to 2010, and as the commander of the Guards Officer Training of the Imam Hossein University from 2010 to 2018.
