= Ahmad Motevaselian =

Iranian military officer (1953–1982)

Sardar Ahmad Motevaselian
- Born: 4 April 1953; Tehran, Imperial State of Iran (present-day Iran)
- Disappeared: 5 July 1982 (aged 29) near Beirut, Lebanon
- Military career
- Allegiance: Imperial State of Iran (1974–1976); Islamic Republic of Iran (1979–1982)
- Branch: Islamic Revolutionary Guard Corps; Islamic Revolutionary Committees; Imperial Iranian Army
- Service years: 1974–1982
- Rank: 3rd Sergeant (1974–1976)
- Units: Shiraz Armored Training Centre; 16th Armored Division of Kermanshah (1974–1976)
- Commands: 27th Mohammad Rasulullah Division
- Conflicts: 1979 Kurdish Rebellion; Iran–Iraq War; Operation Fath ol-Mobin; Operation Beit ol-Moqaddas; Second Battle of Khorramshahr; 1982 Lebanon War (MIA)

Ahmad Motevaselian (Persian: احمد متوسلیان) was an Iranian military officer and attaché who was one of four Iranians who disappeared in Lebanon in 1982. During the Iran–Iraq War, he served as a commander in the Islamic Revolutionary Guard Corps and established the 27th Muhammad Rasulullah Division. He played a role in the Second Battle of Khorramshahr and later, as part of a senior diplomatic group of political and military leaders, went to Syria. On 5 July 1982, when the vehicle carrying the diplomats was passing through a checkpoint post on its way to Beirut, it was intercepted by Phalangists. The car and four passengers completely disappeared.

Iran has accused Israel of kidnapping and holding them in Israeli jails and covering up their fate. Israel has said it is not aware of the fate of the diplomats. Iran called on the International Committee of the Red Cross (ICRC) to investigate their whereabouts. Three decades after the incident, the fate of the missing diplomats remains a mystery, and the search for Motevaselian and the other Iranians continues. However, it is assumed that shortly after their abduction, they were executed by the Phalangist forces.

== Early life ==
Ahmad Motevaselian was born in a religious family in 1954 in the south of Tehran. He spent his primary school years in Mostafavi school in Tehran. During his education, Motevaselian helped his father in his pastry shop. When he was a teenager, he participated in religious ceremonies and masque and started dissident activities against the then ruling regime of Mohammad Reza Pahlavi, the Shah of Iran. After finishing his primary education, he went to industrial school and received his diploma in 1973.

== Before the Iranian Revolution ==
After graduation, Motevaselian went to Shiraz for military service and participated in a special tank training course and was then dispatched to Sarpol-e Zahab. During his service, he continued his political activities against the Shah. After military service, he was employed in a private company and after a few months was sent to Khorramabad. In 1976, the SAVAK (the secret police during the reign of the Shah) arrested him for his political activities. He was jailed for five months in solitary confinement in Falak-ol-Aflak Castle in Khorramabad. Motevaselian actively participated in the 1979 Revolution in his neighborhood and also the south of Tehran. After the victory of the Revolution, he established the Committee of the Islamic Republic in the district near his home, and later joined the Islamic Revolutionary Guard Corps.

== After the Iranian Revolution ==
Following the success of the Revolution, Motevaselian engaged in various revolutionary political and military campaigns:

- The operations against opposition within Kurdistan Province
- Fighting anti-revolutionaries in Bokan, Baneh, and Saghez in 1979
- Liberation of Sanandaj in western Iran from anti-revolutionaries
- Liberation of Paveh-Kermanshah road in 1980
- Liberation of Marivan city in May 1980
- Liberation of Dezli heights
- Established the 27th Muhammad Rasoolullah Division
- Operation Beit ol-Moqaddas on 30 April 1982

== Mission in Lebanon ==
After the Second Battle of Khorramshahr (known in Iran as the Liberation of Khorramshahr), Motevaselian knew that Israel had invaded Lebanon. In June 1982, he went to the Lebanese-Syrian border as head of a commando unit, but the unit was sent back to Iran by Syrian authorities but Motevaselian stayed for protecting Iran's embassy from Israeli forces and Phalange Party. On 5 July 1982, when the vehicle carrying the diplomats was passing through a checkpoint post on its way to Beirut, it was intercepted by Phalange Party, and the car and four passengers disappeared, despite diplomatic immunity and that they were using an official state vehicle. The Iranian diplomats were seen for the last time at the Barbara checkpoint, controlled by Elie Hobeika. They were then abducted by the Phalange Party. The missing diplomats are Motevaselian, military attaché and the commander of the commandos of the June dispatch; Seyed Mohsen Mousavi, chargé d'affaires for the Iranian embassy in Beirut; and Taghi Rastegar Moghadam, the embassy technician; plus Kazem Akhavan, a journalist for Islamic Republic Press Agency.

Eight years later Geagea said: "they had been killed on the orders of the group's intelligence chief, Elie Hobeika." According to an Israeli report, the men were killed by Lebanese forces. Israel claimed in a statement in 2010 that the diplomats had never been surrendered to Israel. Elsewhere in response to a request by the Lebanese Hezbollah, it claimed that the four were dead. Iran has accused Israel of kidnapping and holding them in Israeli jails and covering up their fate. Also, Iran called on the International Committee of the Red Cross (ICRC) to clarify their whereabouts. Israel has claimed that it is aware of the fate of diplomats, and that they were kidnapped by a Lebanese militant group and executed shortly after their abduction. It was believed (by whom?) that they were then buried at a site that was later obliterated by construction works.

Three decades after the incident, the fate of the missing diplomats remains locked in a debate between Iran and Israel. Apart from this debate, many scholars have assumed that shortly after their abduction, they were executed by the Phalange.

== Investigations ==
Adnan Mansour, Lebanese foreign minister, said at a meeting with the families of the abducted Iranian diplomats that "Beirut have sent the United Nations two formal letters in the past two years confirming the abduction of the Iranian nationals on the Lebanese soil and these have been recorded as official documents at the UN Secretariat." The Lebanese justice ministry has been asked to submit a report on the latest investigations conducted into the case, vowing not to spare any effort at both national and international levels to resolve this painful issue.

Former Iranian President Mahmoud Ahmadinejad is quoted by Iran's Fars News Agency as telling U.N. Secretary General Ban Ki-moon during a meeting in New York City "Regarding the four abducted Iranian diplomats, there are documents that show they are alive and in the hands of the Zionist Regime." He also added that "We expected U.N. Secretary General to take serious measures for their release."

On 23 May 2016, Hossein Dehghan (minister of defense of Iran) stated that Ahmad Motevaselian and Iranian diplomats who disappeared in Lebanon, are alive and prisoner in Israeli jails.

Prior to his assassination, Qasem Soleimani, the former head commander of the Quds Force, a paramilitary wing of the IRGC, confirmed a historian's (Davoud Hamidabadi) theory after 25 years of investigating the case that the four Iranian diplomats, including Motevaselian, were all killed on that day and were not in Israeli prisons. He also continued to say that he had done an exchange of prisoners with Lebanese Forces sometime before and that the bones and remains of their bodies were given to him and were returned to Tehran, although the DNA tests said the remains did not match the DNA of Motevaselian. Soleimani's confirmation was widely accepted in Iran.

== In popular culture ==
=== As Tough As Iron 3 ===
The third volume of the As Tough As Iron collection is about the life of Ahmad Motevaselian, written by Zahra Rajabi Matin. This book is published by Alhoda International Publications and is published in English and Arabic. As Tough As Iron consists of seven sections; "Ahmad Motevaselian, A Man who Struggled", "Motevaselian and the Revolution Guards Corps", "Motevaselian Sent to Kurdistan", and "Motevaselian Goes to Khuzestan" are some of the book's sections.

=== Ambush of July 1982 ===
Ambush of July 1982 is calendar of events about kidnapping Iranian diplomats from 1982 to 2005, written by Hamid Davood-abadi حمید داودآبادی. This is valuable book for knowing what happened to the Iranian diplomats in Lebanon. English translation of book was unveiled by the head of Foundation for the preservation of relics and values of the Holy Defense, Mohammad Bagherzadeh. The book published by Chamran Foundation and Foundation for the preservation of relics and values of the Holy Defense in 292 pages.

=== Standing in the Dust ===
Standing in the Dust is a 2016 film about Ahmad Motevaselian, directed by Mohammad Hossein Mahdavian and produced by Habibollah Valinezhad. The film won the Crystal Simorgh for Best Film at the 34th Fajr Film Festival.

== Ahmad Motevaselian Memorial ==
There is a statue of Ahmad Motevaselian installed in Maroun al-Ras (Arabic: مارون الراس), a Lebanese village in Jabal Amel (Mount Amel) of the Nabatiye Governorate. The statue is a memorial and tries to demonstrate that the commander was kidnapped.

Abdol Majid Farahani, the designer of Motevaselian statue, stated:

After the studies that I had regarding the biography of Ahmad Motevaselian and talking with my friends, I decided to design the statue of this great myth in an epic condition which make the people remember him. Since Ahmad Motevaselian launched many operations in Kurdistan and due to the mountainous areas of that place, the idea of designing Ahmad near a rock was something fantastic. The pivot of the idea also is the finger pointing of Ahmad and it shows his targeting. Indeed this great character had mentioned some sentences against the Zionist regime.

== See also ==
- Iranian diplomats kidnapping (1982)
- Seyed Mohsen Mousavi
- Kazem Akhavan
- Taghi Rastegar Moghadam
- List of people who disappeared mysteriously: post-1970
