= Fakkeh, Iran =

Region in Khuzestan and Ilam, Iran

Coordinates: 32.0611°N 47.6819°E

Fakkeh (Persian: فکه) is a place at the northwest of Khuzestan and southeast of Ilam province in Iran. The north of Fakkeh belongs to Dehloran County, Ilam and the south of Fakkeh is belong to Dasht-e Azadegan County, Khuzestan. Also, this place is a border region between Iran and Iraq. There are a lot of sandy land in the Fakkeh area and it has dry weather.

== Iran–Iraq War ==
In the Iran–Iraq War, Iraqi forces attacked to the north of Khuzestan from the Fakkeh region. Also, they reached the Karkheh River and the Ahvaz-Andimeshk road by passing Fakkeh. For this reason, this place was an important region during the war. In 1983, Operation Dawn-1 was an important operation conducted by Iranian forces in the Fakkeh region. Zafar 4 and Ashura 3 are another important operations that occurred at this area. Bodies of 120 Iranian soldiers found after the war and these corpses were at the Fakkeh since 1982.

Hasan Bagheri and Abdul-Majid Baghaei were two Iranian commanders who were killed in the Fakkeh. After the war, many minefields remained in this region. Morteza Avini, an Iranian documentary filmmaker, was killed by shrapnel from a landmine explosion.

== In popular media ==
In Iran, a magazine publish monthly that called Fakkeh. Line of Fakkeh is memoir book about Seyyed Muhammad Shokri's memoirs and translated in France.

== See also ==
- Iran–Iraq War
