= Operation Forty Stars =

Iraqi military operation in the Iran–Iraq War

- Part of the Iran–Iraq War
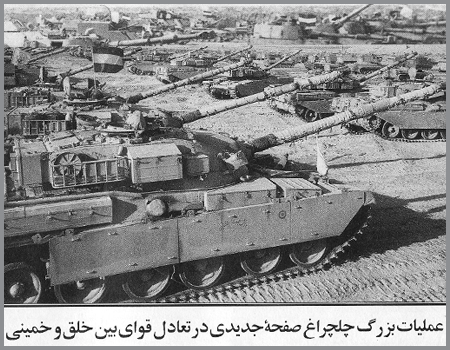
Date	18 June 1988
Location	Mehran County, Iran
Result	MEK/NLAI victory: Successful MEK offensive; Iranian defensive failure
Territorial changes	PMOI captures Mehran from the Iranian forces

Belligerents
MEK; NLAI; Supported by: Iraq	Iran

Commanders and leaders
Massoud Rajavi	(Iran) Ruhollah Khomeini (Iran) Akbar Hashemi Rafsanjani (Iran) Ali Shahbazi

Strength
22 MEK brigades	16,000 (MEK claim)

Casualties and losses
MEK; 71 dead (MEK claim); 240 wounded (MEK claim); Thousands dead (Iranian claim)	8,000 dead and wounded (MEK claim); 1,500–3,000 captured 40 tanks 20 APCs numerous 155mm and 130mm artillery pieces numerous TOW ATGMs numerous HAWK SAM batteries, and hundreds of small arms, mortars and machineguns captured

Operation Forty Stars (Persian: عملیات چلچراغ), also known as Operation Forty Lights, or Chelcheraq, was a military operation conducted by the People's Mujahedin of Iran (MEK) at the closing stages of the Iran–Iraq War on 18 June 1988. The goal was to occupy the Iranian border city of Mehran to control its oil fields, as well as Kurdish villages in the region.

In four days, the People's Mujahedin of Iran wiped out an Islamic Revolutionary Guard Corps division (11th Amir al-Mo'menin) and a regular army division (16th armored), seizing Mehran and building a bridgehead twelve miles into Iran.

== The battle ==
According to the Center for Strategic and International Studies, on the night of Saturday 18 June, the MEK/PMOI launched the operation. By employing 530 ground-attack sorties with fighter aircraft and helicopter gunships, they crushed the Iranian forces in the area around Mehran, killing or wounding 3,500 and destroying a Revolutionary Guard division as well as a regular army division. Finally, the Iranian town of Mehran was captured and occupied by the MEK/PMOI and Iraqi forces. The MEK/PMOI forces captured several heights around the city. Several depots containing enough supplies to sustain 2 divisions were seized, including many Toyota Land Cruisers.

According to the MEK, Iraqi soldiers did not participate in the operation. Baghdad also said it was not involved in the battle, with Time magazine reporting that "Iraq did claim that its forces had recaptured the oil-rich Majnoun islands east of the Tigris River, where Iranian defenders had been entrenched since 1984."

In June 1988, Tehran radio said Iranian forces had wounded or killed 3,000 Iraqi soldiers. According to the statement and a report by AP News agency, 8,000 Iranians were killed or wounded and more than 1,500 captured in the battle, and about 16,000 Iranians were involved. The Iraqi forces left the area after three days, and the MEK/PMOI forces remained there. Iranian defense forces killed all remaining MEK/PMOI forces inside Iranian territory in Mersad operation. Finally, both sides of the war had officially accepted the ceasefire on 20 July 1988.

== Aftermath ==
It was a severe defeat for the Iranian forces, who lost a large amount of intact equipment, along with many troops killed or captured. Iraq also launched a wide-scale strategic bombing campaign on Iranian population centres and economic targets, setting 10 oil installations and six crude oil production plants in Ahwaz on fire and two pumping stations at Bibi Hakimeh as well as the destruction of other facilities at Gachsaran. Moreover, the bombing campaign included strikes on power stations, natural gas plants and offshore oil facilities.

On 26 July 1988, Iranian forces launched Operation Mersad, and took back Mehran from MEK forces.

== See also ==
- Massoud Rajavi
