= Operation Dawn 3 =

1983 Iran–Iraq War operation

- Part of Iran–Iraq War
Date	30 July – 9 August 1983 (1 week and 3 days)
Location	Mehran, Ilam Province
Result	Iraqi victory: Iranian offensive failure; Iraqi counter-attack succeeds
Territorial changes	Iraq captures Mehran

Belligerents
Iraq	Iran

Strength
60,000	180,000

Casualties and losses
6,000 killed 60 tanks lost	7,000 killed 15,000 wounded

Operation Dawn 3 or Operation Valfajr-3 (Arabic: عملیه الفجر-۳) was an operation during the Iran–Iraq War. The operation was launched in the range of "semi-extensive operation" located in the general area of Mehran (in Ilam Province); and eventually led to the liberation of Mehran by Iranian forces. Iran's goals of the operation were as follows:

- Liberation of Mehran city from the eye/range of the enemy
- Making facility in the relation of "Dehloran–Mehran" and also "Ilam–Mehran"
- Modulation of defense lines against the enemy (Iraq), and pulling it from the heights to plain(s).

It was Iran's worst defeat out of all the Dawn operations. Around 180,000 Iranian troops participated in this offensive, which targeted the central front in the region of Mehran. However, withering Iraqi firepower in support of deeply entrenched troops slaughtered the advancing Iranians. Although Iranian troops were highly motivated, they were poorly trained and equipped for this battle. For Iran, the operation was a disaster.

The Iraqis struck back by emerging from their trenches to counterattack into Iran and capture Mehran, for the second time.

== Background ==
The Operation Dawn 3 is part of the series of Dawn operations, which involved about 500,000 troops covering a 150-mile front. It was launched in February 1983 and was described by Speaker Akbar Hashemi Rafsanjani as the final move towards ending the Iran-Iraq war. The first campaign was concentrated in the Hawizeh marsh area and in the Haj Omran during the Operation Dawn 2. These achieved only minimal gains and started to diminish the morale of the Iranian troops as well as the Iranian reputation. The Iranians began a new attack in July 1983 in the central (Zurbatiya) sector.

== Battle ==
The Iranians attempted to further exploit activities in the north after Operation Dawn 2 on 30 July 1983. Iran saw an opportunity to sweep away Iraqi forces controlling the roads between the Iranian controlled mountain border towns of Mehran, Dehloran and Elam. Iraq conducted airstrikes against 50,000 Iranian forces lodged in mountainous terrain, exhausting themselves attempting to dislodge the Iranians. Realising they needed to alter their tactics, Iraq equipped attack helicopters with chemical warheads; while ineffective, it demonstrated both the Iraqi general staff's and Saddam's increasing interest in using chemical weapons. In the end, in total 17,000 soldiers had lost their lives,[clarification needed] with no gain for either country.[73]

== See also ==
- Operation Ashura (Iran)
