= Al-Fakkah Field =

Oil field in Iraq

Al-Fakkah Field (Arabic: حقل الفكة)
- Location within Iraq
- Country: Iraq, Iran
- Offshore/onshore: onshore
- Coordinates: 32°02′N 47°37′E
- Operators: Iraq Ministry of Oil, Iran Ministry of Petroleum

Field history
- Peak year: 1979

The Al-Fakkah Field, also known as Jebel Al-Fauqi or Jebal Al-Fauqi, is an oil field located in southern Iraq's Maysan Governorate and Khūzestān Province, Iran. The oil field produced 50,000 barrels per day (7,900 m^{3}/d) prior to the 2003 Iraq War and is part of the Maysan oilfield complex that altogether holds reserve of 2.5 billion barrels (400×10^{6} m^{3}). The oil field is considered shared but an area of dispute between Iraq and Iran. Iraq unsuccessfully put the oil field up for bidding in 2009.

== Iraq and Iran dispute ==
Iraq and Iran have been in dispute over the Fakkah oil field and other adjacent fields such as the Abu Ghurab, and Buzugan since 2003. In the past, Iraq has accused Iran of "horizontal drilling" in the Fakkah field. This would entail Iran drilling into Iraqi territory to search for oil. The two sides also dispute the precise location of the border. In 2009, Iran had begun to make incursions into a disputed area of the Fakkah field but were often turned away by Iraqi workers.

On December 18, 2009, about a dozen Iranian troops crossed three hundred yards into Iraq and seized oil well No. 4 in the Fakkah Field, raising the Iranian flag on site. The incident infuriated Iraq who demanded that Iran withdraw. While the Fakkah oil field is considered shared, Iraq considers well No. 4 as theirs. The well was drilled in 1979 and initially produced 3,000 barrels (480 m^{3}) per day. However, production on the well ceased in 1980 due to the Iran–Iraq War. On December 21, after a series of political negotiations, Iran withdrew from oil well No. 4.

== See also ==
- Iran–Iraq border
- Yadavaran Field
