= Operation Muharram =

1982 Iran–Iraq War operation

- Part of Iran–Iraq War
| Date | 1–6 November 1982 |
| Location | Dehloran, Iran |
| Result | Iraqi defensive victory: Iraq repulsed Iranian offensives in the direction of Al-Amarah; Iran captures Musiyan, Dehloran road, Abu Shirin and Bayat oil facilities; Iranian offensive had small gains; Iranian offensive failed to penetrate deep into Iraq |

Belligerents
| Iran | Iraq |

Casualties and losses
| 4,000 killed 70 tanks and 40 artillery pieces lost | 3,000 killed 3,500 captured |

Operation Muharram (Persian: عملیات محرم) was a series of four Iranian operations in Amara area which failed to penetrate deep into Iraq and only had small gains. It was conducted during the Iran–Iraq War by the command of Hasan Bagheri. Iraq managed to repulse Iranian offensives in the direction of Al-Amarah.

It was started on 1 November 1982 at 22:08 o'clock with the code of "La-Hawla wa La-Qowwatah Ela Bellah; Ya Zeinab-Kobra (S)". The goal of this operation was "liberation of Iran's occupied lands in the vicinity of frontier mountains of Jabal-al-Hamrain in the south of Dehloran and the region which was between Fakkeh till Dehloran city.

Operation Muharram is known as one of exterritorial operations of Iran, too; because, advance in the territory of Iraq was planned as well as liberation plan of Iran's occupied lands. Operational area of Muharram was limited from the east to Doyrej river, and from the west to the frontier highlands of Jabal-al-Hamrain and Jabal-al-Fuqi. The operation was regarded as the continuation of Operation Fath ol-Mobin that could complete its goals by winning in that.

Iranian newspapers claimed that at the end of Operation Muharram, Iran succeeded to free the highlands 400/298, Bayat oil territory, Anbar river, Chamsari police station, Musian and other returns, among freeing 550 kilometers of Iran's lands, capturing 2,350 Iraqis, and 6000 Iraqis were killed/injured; plus other casualties to Iraqi Army.

== See also ==
- Operation Ramadan
- Operation Ashura (Iran)
