= Operation Muslim ibn Aqil =

1982 Iran–Iraq War operation

Operation Muslim Ibn Aqil
- Part of Iran–Iraq War
Date	1–7 October 1982
Location	Sumar, Iran
Result	Iraqi victory

Belligerents
Iran	Iraq

Strength
60,000 soldiers 300 tanks and artillery pieces each	36,000 soldiers 400 tanks and artillery pieces each

Casualties and losses
6,000 killed 15,000 wounded	2,000 killed 50 tanks lost

Operation Muslim Ibn Aqil (Persian: عملیات مسلم بن عقیل; also spelled Moslem ibn Aghil) was an operation during the Iran–Iraq War which was launched by the Islamic Revolutionary Guard Corps (IRGC) and the Iranian Army with the code of "Ya Abal-Fazl al-Abbas" on 1 October 1982.

The goal of the operation was to capture all heights which were overlooking the town of Mandali, Iraq. Another goal of the operation was to ensure the middle-front borders, secure the liberated Iranian territory, and expel Iraqi forces from the west of Sumar, Iran.

During the operation, Iranian forces were successful in the first stage; their progress rate reduced at the second stage, and eventually they were unable to consolidate their conquered positions.

In the operation which was done in two steps in a seven-day period, 150 km^{2} of Iranian territory was liberated, and approximately 30 km^{2} of Iraq was seized by Iranian forces. Meanwhile, as well as ensuring Sumar, the Iranians dominated the Giskeh heights, Kohneh-Rig and straits of Iran-Iraq border. The operation finally finished on 7 October 1982.
