= Operation Dawn (1983) =

Iran–Iraq War operation

Operation Dawn-1
- Part of Iran–Iraq War
Date	10–16 April, 1983 (7 days)
Location	Al-Fakkah Field
Result	Iraqi victory: Iranian offensive failure; Iraqi defensive success

Belligerents
Iraq	Iran

Strength
55,000 men	50,000 men

Casualties and losses
Moderate	6,000 killed

Operation Dawn-1 (also known as Operation Valfajr-1) was an Iranian offensive in the Iran–Iraq War. On April 10, 1983, Iran struck Ayn Al-Qaws with the immediate objective of Al-Fakkah Field (east of al-Amarah) to capture the Baghdad-Basra Highway. The operation was fought mostly by Pasdaran forces and was one of the three costly human wave offensives of 1983, the Iranians failed to defeat the Iraqis.

== Battle ==
In early February 1983, 50,000 Iranian forces attacked westward from Dezful and were confronted by 55,000 Iraqi forces. The Iranian objective was to cut off the road from Basra to Baghdad in the central sector. The attack started on a rainy day, with the Iranians hoping that cloud cover would shield them from Iraqi air attacks. Once the clouds lifted, Iraq conducted 150 air sorties, which generated a 3 to 1 kill ratio of Iranians to Iraqis. The Iraqis, sensing the efficacy of close air attacks, directed aerial bombings on the cities of Dezful, Ahvaz, and Khoramshahr in retribution for the Iranian Dawn 1 offensive. The Iranians continued to order up more forces, and the 92nd Armoured Division pushed forward from Dezful to repel one Iraqi armoured brigade.
