= Operation Ramadan =

1982 Iran–Iraq War operation

- Part of Iran–Iraq War
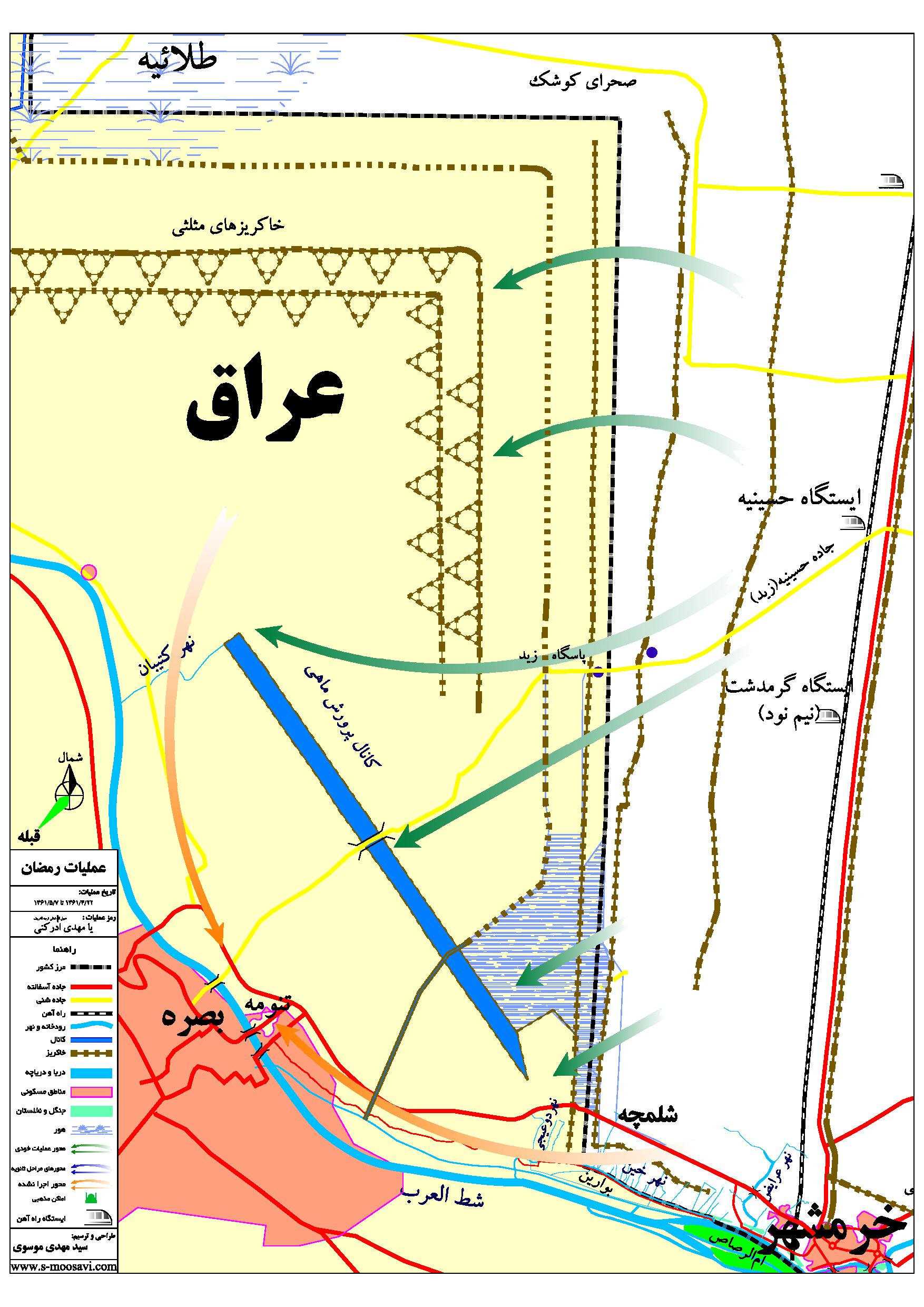
- Operation Ramadan, Map. Iraq in yellow.
Date	13 July – 3 August, 1982 (3 weeks)
Location	North-East of Basra, southern Iraq
Result	Iraqi victory: Iran fails to capture its main operational objective of Basra; Successful Iraqi defence
Territorial changes	Iran captures 50 square Kilometers

Belligerents
Iraq	Iran

Commanders and leaders
(Iraq) Saddam Hussein (Iraq) Maher Abd al-Rashid	(Iran) Ruhollah Khomeini (Iran) Mohsen Rezaee (Iran) Ali Sayad Shirazi

Strength
8 divisions 80,000–100,000 troops 700+ tanks	90,000–150,000 troops 300+ tanks 300 artillery pieces

Casualties and losses
5,000 killed 1,000 captured 150 tanks lost	12,000 killed 300 tanks lost

Operation Ramadan was an Iranian offensive in the Iran–Iraq War that consisted of three separate attacks that lasted for 6 weeks. It was launched by Iran on 13 July 1982 near Basra and featured the use of human wave attacks in the largest land battle since World War II. The engagement was a part of the overall stalemate.

== Prelude ==
By the middle of 1982, Iraq was mostly expelled from Iranian territory, having lost nearly all the gains they made during the invasion in 1980. Saddam Hussein used the Israeli invasion of Lebanon as an excuse to seek an end to the war and send the Palestinians aid. Seyyed Ruhollah Khomeini rejected peace offers from Baghdad and began preparing to expand into Iraq.

Initially, some in Tehran rejected the idea of invasion, claiming that such a move would undermine Iran's moral standing and diminish the sympathy gained by Muslim countries as the result of Saddam's invasion. These individuals were backed by Iranian army officers. However, these voices were shut out by pro-war voices in Tehran, who claimed that Baghdad could be defeated with the use of zealous fighters and invoking anti-government sentiment amongst Iraq's Shia. At the time, the Iranian population experienced a euphoria of victory. Thus, plans for invasion included both the silencing of Iraqi artillery that was shelling border towns, destroying the Iraqi Third Corps, and the seizure of Basra (Iraq's third largest city). Iran's ultimate objectives were encapsulated in the popular revolutionary refrain "The road to Jerusalem passes through the Iraqi city of Karbala." Iraq was now regarded as a stepping stone for the export of Iran's revolution across the region. Given that the first day of the operation coincided with the holy month of Ramadan, it was given the name as suited.

== Preparations ==
Iraq had suffered enormously from the loss. Only a third of Iraq's air force remained intact, but the remaining Iraqi ground forces stayed on the alert, as Iran amassed a number of its troops to the east of Basra, just across the border. In the years prior, Saddam Hussein took the precautions for an Iranian invasion by stationing large numbers of his forces along the borders. Though demoralized due to their recent defeats, the armies of Iraq enjoyed better supplies, training, and information than their Iranian counterparts. The Iraqis also constructed a detailed plan of earthworks and trenches, followed by mine-fields with machine gun, artillery positions and dug-in tanks.

The Iranians' main objective was to destroy the Iraqi 3rd Corps which was responsible for the area north of Basra. Since tanks would be confronted on the battlefield, the Iranians made use of RPG teams, who carried three grenades and were disciplined in anti-tank warfare.

The Iranian army officers wanted to launch an all-out attack on Baghdad and seize it before the weapon shortages continued to manifest further. Instead, the decision was made to capture one area of Iraq after the other in the hopes that a series of blows delivered foremost by the Revolutionary Guards Corps would create unrest within the Iraqi Shia society. Later historians have marked this as the first in a series of mistakes that would bring Iran to a verge of defeat.

The Iranians planned their attack in southern Iraq, near Basra, the second most important city in Iraq. Called Operation Ramadan, it involved over 180,000 troops from both sides, and was one of the largest land battles since World War II. The majority of Iran's army was already in the area, and Commander-in-Chief Akbar Rafsanjani, along with most of the leaders in Tehran, expected Iraq's oppressed Shia majority to revolt against Saddam's rule; this would help Iran capture southern Iraq, then Kurdistan (with the help of Kurdish revolutionaries), and finally close in on central Iraq (including Baghdad) from three sides, causing Saddam's government to collapse. Though the Kurdish fighters helped in northern Iraq, the Shia rebellion failed to materialise in southern Iraq. Iranian strategy also dictated that they launch their primary attack on the weakest point of the Iraqi lines; however, the Iraqis were informed of Iran's battle plans and moved all of their forces to the area the Iranians planned to attack. The Iraqis were also equipped with tear gas to use against the enemy, which would be first use of chemical warfare during the conflict.

== The battle ==
The battle was preceded by two days of heavy artillery exchanges along the front lines. Then, on July 13, the following code was broadcast on radio frequencies along Iranian lines.

Ya saheb az zaman! Ya saheb az zaman! (Thou absent Imam!)

Over 100,000 Revolutionary Guards and Basij volunteer forces charged towards the Iraqi lines. The Iraqi troops had entrenched themselves in formidable defences, and had set up a network of bunkers, artillery positions and rows of tanks in hull-down position. Iraqi morale had gone up, as they were fighting to defend their own nation. Saddam had also more than doubled the size of the Iraqi army, from 200,000 soldiers (12 divisions and 3 independent brigades) to 500,000 (23 divisions and nine brigades).

Among the regular Iranian formations that were charging were the 16th (M60A1 MBTs), 88th (M47 and M48A5 MBTs), and 92nd (Chieftain Mk 3/5 MBTs) Armoured Divisions, along with the 21st, 40th and 77th Mechanized Divisions. Iran's Revolutionary Guards also used captured Iraqi T-55 tanks they had captured in earlier battles.

The Basij launched human wave attacks on Iraqi positions, inspired before battle by tales of Ashura, the Battle of Karbala, and the glory of martyrdom. Sometimes an actor (usually an older soldier) would play the part of Imam Hossein and, on a white horse, gallop along the lines, providing the inexperienced soldiers a vision of "the hero who would lead them into their fateful battle before they met their God". The "martyrs" had signed "Passports to Paradise" (as admission forms to the Basij were nicknamed), received a week of basic military training by the Revolutionary Guard, and were sent directly to the front lines. The human wave assaults, often with no support from other military branches due to rivalry with the remnants of the former Imperial Iranian Army, were met with crushing artillery, rocket, and tank fire from Iraq's defence that caused massive losses to the Iranian side.

By 16 July, the Iranians had in their first attack succeeded in overrunning the forward Iraqi defence lines right at the border, gained in their deepest penetration 16 km (9.9 mi) inside Iraq and claimed to have captured 288 square kilometers (180 square miles) of Iraqi territory albeit with a great deal of casualties. Elements of the Iranian forces had penetrated as far as the Kutayba river, a tributary to the Shatt Al Arab river, but failed to cross it. However, the Iranian forces came to a halt as the Iraqis stopped the main Iranian attack and launched frontal and flanking counter-attacks supported by air strikes from fighter-bombers that pushed the Iranians back to within 4 kilometers (2,5 miles) from the border.

The Iraqis used their Mi-25 helicopters, along with Gazelle helicopters armed with HOT missiles against columns of Iranian mechanised infantry and tanks. These "hunter-killer" teams of helicopters, which had been formed with the help of East German advisors, proved to be very costly for the Iranians. Aerial dogfights occurred between Iraqi MiGs and Iranian Phantoms. During this battle, the Iraqis also made first significant use of chemical weapons, contributing to their successes on the battlefield. During this instance, the Iraqis used large amounts of non-lethal tear gas to disrupt the offensive, throwing an entire attacking Iranian division into chaos.

On 21 July, the Iranians tried again with a second thrust and managed to penetrate through the Iraqi defence lines once again. However, only 13 km (8.1 mi) from Basra, the poorly equipped Iranian forces were surrounded on three sides and cut off from Iranian logistics and supply units by Iraqis who counter-attacked with heavy weaponry. The Iraqi counter-attacks once again pushed the Iranians back to their starting point where fighting slowed to a stalemate. Only a last-minute attack by Iranian Cobra helicopters stopped the Iraqis from routing the Iranians completely. Three more similar Iranian attacks occurred around the Khorramshar-Basra road area towards the end of the month, but none were significantly successful.

The final Iranian thrust came on 1 August, when in a last ditch effort, the Iranians attacked Iraqi defence lines at the border, taking a sliver of land before fighting died down on 3 August.

Iraq had concentrated three armoured divisions, the 3rd, 9th, and 10th, as a counter-attack force to attack any penetrations. They were successful in defeating the Iranian breakthroughs, but suffered heavy losses. The 9th Armoured Division in particular had been practically wiped out, lead to it being disbanded, and was never reformed.

For Iran the additional loss of armor meant a further weakening in power projection and came to further reinforce its inability to conduct sweeping offensives at depth. Staunch Iraqi defense had managed to wipe out the already understrength Iranian armored divisions involved in the operation, and they had succeeded in doing so right at the border. For Iran this setback was compounded by the fact that losses in armor could not be replaced at the same rate and to the same degree as that of Iraq's. These cumulative losses would have a catalytic effect on Iranian warfighting capacity. As time went on Iran gradually weakened while Iraq strengthened.

== Aftermath ==
The operation was the first of many disastrous Iranian offensives which cost thousands of lives on both sides. The Iranians in particular had suffered appalling casualties in exchange for very limited territorial gains. According to scholar Rob Johnson, "Operation Ramadan was, by any standard, a criminal failure of leadership and strategy." This one in general boosted the casualty limit up to 80,000 killed, 200,000 wounded, and 45,000 made prisoner of war. In retrospect, the Iranians lacked effective command and control, air support, and logistics to sustain an offensive in the first place. Saddam Hussein offered several ceasefire attempts in the following years, none of which were accepted by Khomeini.
