= Hossein Taeb =

Iranian Shia cleric

Hujjat al-Islam Sardar Hossein Taeb
- حسین طائب
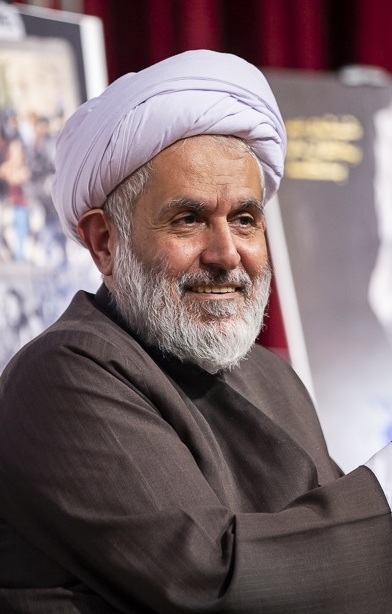
- Hojjatol Eslam Hossein Taeb visiting university students at Shahed University, Tehran.

6th and 10th Commander of the Basij
- Incumbent
- Assumed office 10 August 2026
- President: Masoud Pezeshkian
- Supreme Leader: Mojtaba Khamenei
- Preceded by: Gholamreza Soleimani
- In office 12 July 2008 – 4 October 2009
- President: Mahmoud Ahmadinejad
- Supreme Leader: Ali Khamenei
- Preceded by: Mohammad Ali Jafari (acting); Mohammad Hejazi
- Succeeded by: Mohammad Reza Naqdi

Director of the IRGC Intelligence Organization
- In office October 2009 – 23 June 2022
- President: Mahmoud Ahmadinejad; Hassan Rouhani; Ebrahim Raisi
- Supreme Leader: Ali Khamenei
- Preceded by: Office established
- Succeeded by: Mohammad Kazemi

Personal details
- Born: 1963 (age 62–63) Tehran, Pahlavi Iran

Military service
- Allegiance: Iran
- Branch/service: IRGC
- Years of service: 2026–present 1982–2022
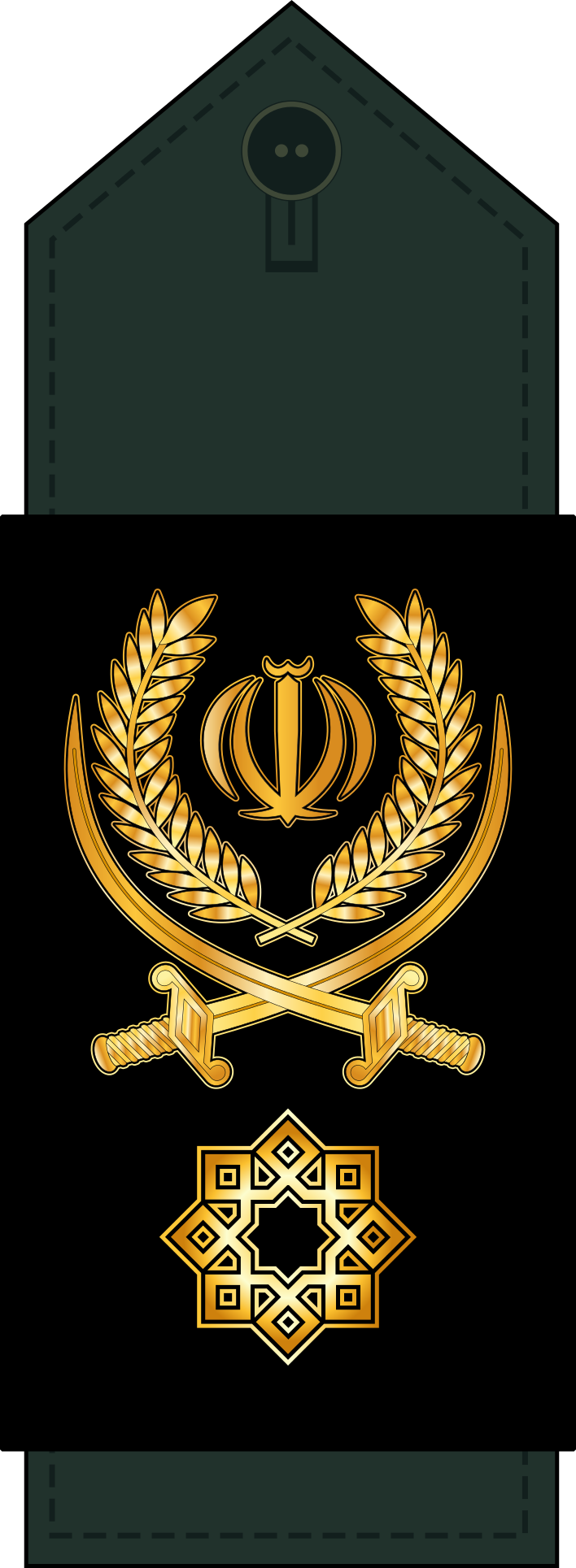
- Rank: Brigadier General
- Battles/wars: Iran–Iraq War; 2009 Iranian presidential election protests; Syrian civil war; Iranian intervention in Syria; War in Iraq (2013–2017); Iranian intervention in Iraq; Iran–PJAK conflict; Western Iran clashes; 2026 Iran war

Hossein Taeb (Persian: حسین طائب) (born 1963) is an Iranian Shia cleric and a senior Islamic Revolutionary Guard Corps (IRGC) official who is the commander of the Basij paramilitary unit. He was formerly head of the Intelligence Organization of the IRGC.

== Early life and education ==
Taeb was born in 1342 (1963/4). (Note: According to a biography from the pro-government Iran Student Correspondents Association summarized in the website Iran Rises,)

After his middle education, he went to seminary school and reached an advanced degree (kharej) in Islamic jurisprudence after studying in Tehran, Mashhad, and Qom. He had studied with, among others, Supreme Leader Ali Khamenei.

== Career ==
Taeb joined the IRGC (which supervises the Basij) in 1361 (1982/3), beginning his work in Region 10 of Tehran, and continued on to Qom and Mashhad. For a while he was IRGC coordinator with the Supreme Leader of Iran as well as the cultural commander of Imam Hossein College.

Under Taeb's command, the Basij played a key role in suppressing protests over the controversial 2009 Iranian presidential elections. The suppression saw the death of at least dozens of protesters on the streets or in prison. He was also involved in other controversial activities, such as: involvement in the "chain murders" of Iranian intellectuals in the 1990s, and targeting of Iranian dissidents abroad, including assassinations.

In public statements Taeb cautioned Iranians that the United States was "hiring agents and mercenaries in an effort to continue its plots for a soft overthrow of the Islamic Republic," according to the Iranian Fars news agency. Taeb has also stated that the post-election "anti-government riots" "killed eight members of the Basij and wounded 300 others."

In 2022, he and his family members were sanctioned by the US Department of State for his involvement in human rights violations in Iran.

Taeb was dismissed from his position as head of Intelligence of the IRGC in June 2022. This is speculated to be due to an incident where an alleged Iranian operation to attack Israeli tourists in Turkey was outed, resulting in the arrest of the agents and a diplomatic spat with Turkey, as well as other incidents that suggested successful Israeli spy operations that Taeb failed to prevent. The dismissal also coincided with the arrest of Brigadier General Ali Nasiri on suspicion of spying for Israel.

On 10 August 2026, Taeb was appointed commander of the Basij, four years after former Supreme Leader Ali Khamenei dismissed him as head of the IRGC Intelligence Organization. The appointment came amid uncertainty over Mojtaba Khamenei's status, with unconfirmed reports questioning whether he remains alive.

=== Offices ===
As of 2009, the list of his responsibilities included:

- Deputy Culture of Joint Staff of the Islamic Revolutionary Guard Corps
- Commander department of Culture of Imam Hossein University
- Commander of the Basij from 29 October 2007 to 2009
- Head of the Intelligence Organization of the Islamic Revolutionary Guard Corps from October 2009 to June 2022
- Commander of the Basij since 10 August 2026

== Personal life ==
Taeb lost a brother in the Operation Karbala-5 during the Iran–Iraq War. He is married with three children.

== International sanctions ==
Private property of Hossein Taeb is frozen by the European Union and he is not allowed to enter Europe because "forces under his command participated in mass beatings, murders, detentions and tortures of peaceful protestors." He has also been blacklisted by the U.S. government.

== Notes ==
Military offices
Preceded by Mohammad Hejazi	Commander of Basij; 2007–2009	Succeeded by Mohammad Reza Naqdi
New title Agency founded	Commander of Intelligence Organization of the Islamic Revolutionary Guard Corps; 2009–2022	Succeeded by Mohammad Kazemi
