= Ali Akbar Ahmadian =

Secretary of the Supreme National Security Council of Iran

Sardar Ali Akbar Ahmadian
- علی‌اکبر احمدیان
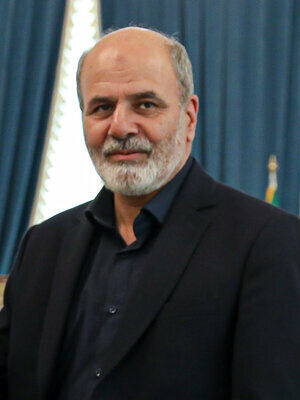
- Ahmadian in 2023

5th Secretary of the Supreme National Security Council
- In office 22 May 2023 – 5 August 2025
- President: Ebrahim Raisi Masoud Pezeshkian
- Supreme Leader: Ali Khamenei
- Preceded by: Ali Shamkhani
- Succeeded by: Ali Larijani

Member of Expediency Discernment Council
- Incumbent
- Assumed office 20 September 2022
- Appointed by: Ali Khamenei
- Supreme Leader: Ali Khamenei; Mojtaba Khamenei
- Chairman: Sadiq Larijani
Other posts held
Special Envoy of the President & Head of the National and Strategic Projects Progress Headquarters
Incumbent
Assumed office 2025
President	Masoud Pezeshkian
Supreme Leader	Ali Khamenei; Mojtaba Khamenei
Preceded by	Office Established
Representative of the Supreme Leader to the National Defense Council
Incumbent
Assumed office 2025
President	Masoud Pezeshkian
Supreme Leader	Ali Khamenei; Mojtaba Khamenei
Representative of the Supreme Leader to the Supreme National Security Council (SNSC)
In office 2023–2025
President	Ebrahim Raisi; Mohammad Mokhber (acting); Masoud Pezeshkian
Supreme Leader	Ali Khamenei
Vice Chairman of the Infrastructure and Production Commission of the Expediency Discernment Council
Incumbent
Assumed office 2022
President	Ebrahim Raisi; Mohammad Mokhber (acting); Masoud Pezeshkian
Supreme Leader	Ali Khamenei; Mojtaba Khamenei
Preceded by	Mohammad-Reza Bahonar
commander of Imam Hossein University
In office 2005–2007
President	Mahmoud Ahmadinejad
Supreme Leader	Ali Khamenei
Preceded by	Ahmad Fazaeli
Succeeded by	Reza Karami-Nia
Head of the IRGC Strategic Center
Incumbent
Assumed office 2007
President	Mahmoud Ahmadinejad; Hassan Rouhani; Ebrahim Raisi; Mohammad Mokhber (acting); Masoud Pezeshkian
Supreme Leader	Ali Khamenei; Mojtaba Khamenei
Chairman of the Board of Directors of the IRGC Cooperation Bonyad
In office 2007–?
President	Mahmoud Ahmadinejad ?
Supreme Leader	Ali Khamenei
Chief of the Joint Staff of the IRGC
In office 2000–2007
President	Mohammad Khatami; Mahmoud Ahmadinejad
Supreme Leader	Ali Khamenei
Preceded by	Hossein Alaei
Succeeded by	Mohammad Hejazi
Commander of the IRGC Navy
In office 27 August 1997 – 19 July 2000
President	Mohammad Khatami
Supreme Leader	Ali Khamenei
Preceded by	Ali Shamkhani
Succeeded by	Morteza Saffari
Deputy Commander of the IRGC Navy
In office 1990–1997
Supreme Leader	Ali Khamenei
Preceded by	Hassan Danaeifar
Succeeded by	Ali Fadavi
Chief of Staff of the IRGC Navy
In office 1985–1990
President	Ali Khamenei; Akbar Hashemi Rafsanjani
Prime Minister	Mir-Hossein Mousavi
Supreme Leader	Ruhollah Khomeini; Ali Khamenei
Preceded by	Office Established
Succeeded by	?
Chief of Staff of Noah-e-Nabi Headquarters
In office 1984–1985
President	Ali Khamenei
Prime Minister	Mir-Hossein Mousavi
Supreme Leader	Ruhollah Khomeini
Preceded by	Office Established
Succeeded by	?

Personal details
- Born: Ali Akbar Ahmadian Babaki; 1961 (age 64–65) Shahr-e Babak, Kerman, Pahlavi Iran

Military service
- Allegiance: Iran
- Branch/service: IRGC
- Years of service: 1980–present
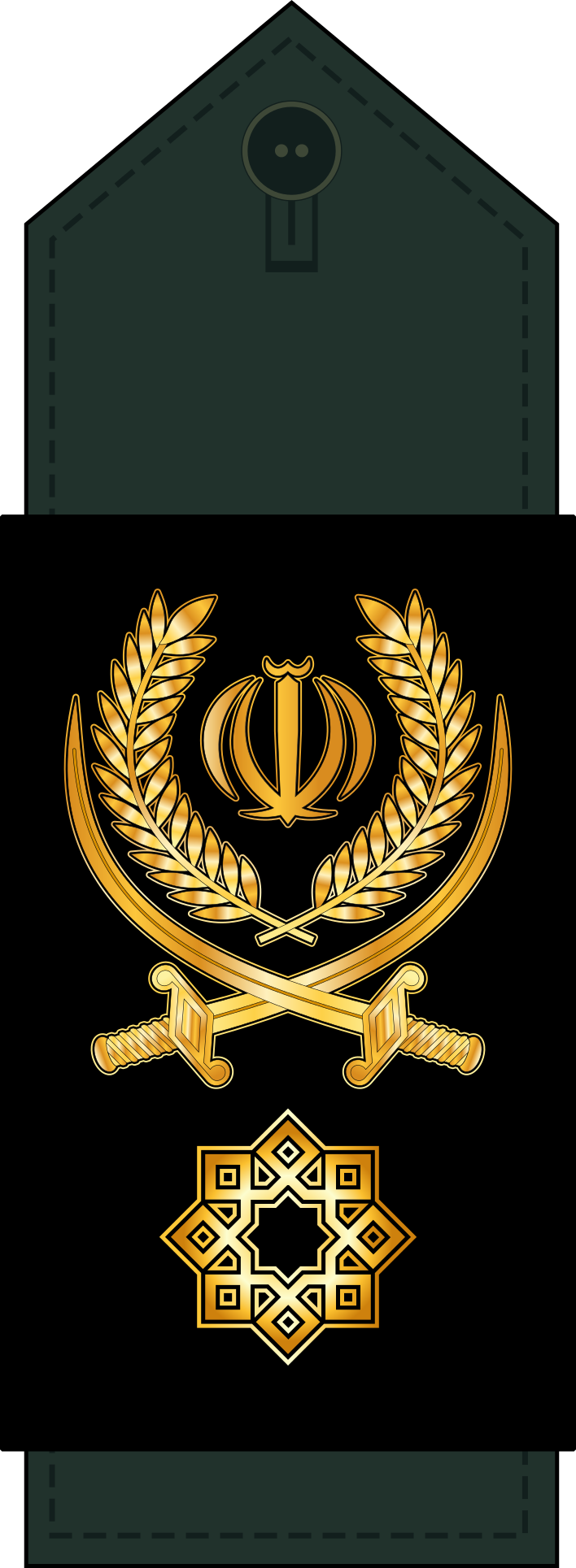
- Rank: Commodore
- Battles/wars: Iran–Iraq War; 2024 Iran–Israel conflict; Twelve-Day War; 2026 Iran war

Ali Akbar Ahmadian Babaki (born 1961) is an Iranian military officer and was secretary of the Supreme National Security Council (SNSC), a position to which he was appointed on 22 May 2023. He is also currently a member of the Expediency Discernment Council since 2022.

Ahmadian began his military career in the Revolutionary Guards in 1980 and fought in the Iran-Iraq War. From 1985 to 1990, he was the head of the IRGC Navy Staff, from 1990 to 1997, he was the deputy commander of the IRGC Navy, and from 1997 to 2000, he served as the commander of the IRGC Navy. Ahmadian was the head of the Joint Chiefs of Staff of the Revolutionary Guards from 2000 to 2007.

Ahmadian's name is on the list of individuals sanctioned by the United States and the European Union. On August 8, 2023, the Canadian Ministry of Foreign Affairs sanctioned him for "a threat to international peace and security and gross and systematic violations of human rights."

== Early life ==
Ahmadian was born in 1961.

== Career ==
After a stint in the Iran–Iraq War Ahmadian served as Ali Shamkhani’s deputy commander in the IRGC Navy.

President Ebrahim Raisi appointed him on 22 May 2023 to the position of Secretary of the SNSC.

On 8 August 2023 Canada sanctioned Ahmadian.
