= Mohammad Reza Fallahzadeh =

Iranian senior military officer

Sardar Mohammad Reza Fallahzadeh
- محمدرضا فلاح‌زاده
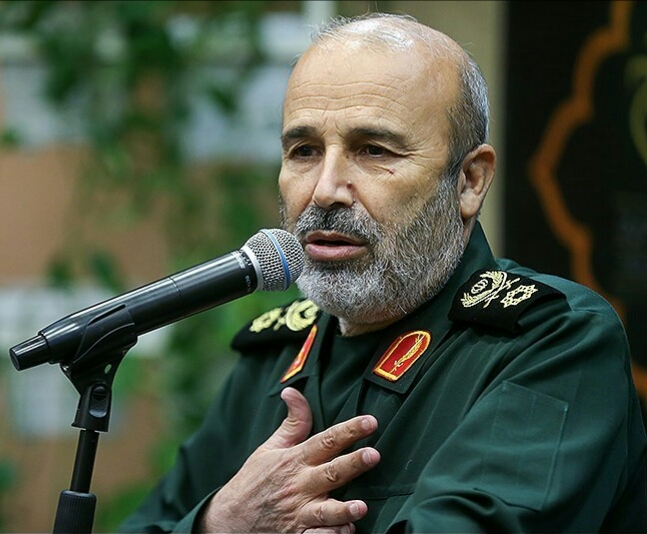
- Fallahzadeh in 2021

Deputy Commander of the Quds Force
- Incumbent
- Assumed office 18 April 2021
- President: Hassan Rouhani; Ebrahim Raisi; Mohammad Mokhber (acting); Masoud Pezeshkian
- Supreme Leader: Ali Khamenei; Mojtaba Khamenei
- Preceded by: Mohammad Hejazi

Deputy Coordinator of the Quds Force
- In office 2018–2021
- President: Hassan Rouhani
- Supreme Leader: Ali Khamenei
- Preceded by: Asghar Sabouri
- Succeeded by: Mohammad-Hadi Haj Rahimi

Governor of Yazd province
- In office 19 August 2007 – 30 October 2013
- President: Mahmoud Ahmadinejad
- Supreme Leader: Ali Khamenei
- Preceded by: Abolghasem Asi (acting)
- Succeeded by: Mohammad MirMohammadi

Personal details
- Born: 1962 (age 63–64) Abarkuh, Yazd, Pahlavi Iran

Military service
- Allegiance: Iran
- Branch/service: Islamic Revolutionary Guard Corps
- Years of service: 2011–present 1980–2007
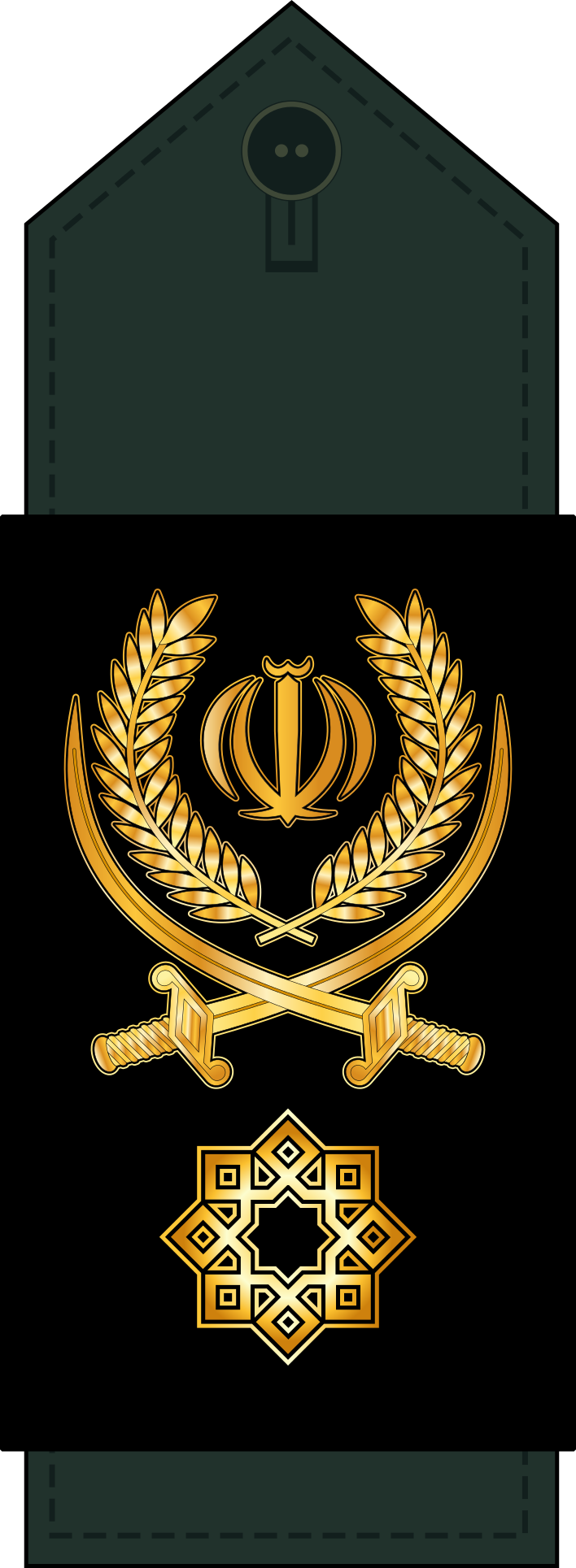
- Rank: Brigadier General
- Unit: Quds Force
- Commands: Quds Karbala Headquarters (2005–2007); 19th Fajr Division (2004–2005); 18th Al-Ghadir Brigade (?–2004)
- Battles/wars: Iran–Iraq War; Syrian civil war; Iranian intervention in Syria; War in Iraq (2013–2017); Iranian intervention in Iraq; 2019–2021 Persian Gulf crisis; 2024 Iran–Israel conflict; Twelve-Day War; 2026 Iran war

Mohammad Reza Fallahzadeh (Persian: محمدرضا فلاح‌زاده) is an Iranian senior military officer and politician who is deputy commander of Quds Force of the Islamic Revolutionary Guard Corps (IRGC) since April 2021. Fallahzadeh served as the IRGC Quds Force's deputy for coordination affairs before taking the new job.

He served as governor of the Yazd province from 2007 to 2013 during presidency of Mahmoud Ahmadinejad.

== Early life and military career ==
Fallahzadeh was born in 1962 or 1963 in Abarkuh, in Yazd Province, Iran. His family has a military history as one brother was killed in the Iran–Iraq War in 1987 and the other still serves in the Quds Force. He himself joined the IRGC in 1980, around the onset of the Iran–Iraq War, although reports suggest he saw limited combat during the conflict.

== Roles in IRGC ==
While serving in the IRGC he rose through the ranks commanding multiple IRGC provincial divisions, the 33rd al‑Mahdi and 19th Fajr, later leading the IRGC units in Yazd, Isfahan, and Fars. He then served from 2007 to 2013, as Governor of Yazd Province under President Ahmadinejad. His tenure drew criticism for replacing civil officials with IRGC personnel and focusing on political advancement.

== Economic & military projects ==
After 2013, he headed Karbala Roads & Development, an IRGC linked construction outfit tied to Khatam al-Anbia, before being redeployed to Syria. While in Syria he was promoted to become the Quds Force's second-in-command, notably active in the Battle of Aleppo.

== Deputy commander of Quds Force ==
In April 2021, following the death of his predecessor Mohammad Hejazi, Fallahzadeh was appointed Deputy Commander of the Quds Force, the IRGC's elite overseas operations branch.

== Recent developments ==
Since late 2023, he has been repeatedly linked by Israeli media as the target of airstrikes in Lebanon and Damascus. Iranian sources have consistently denied his death, and as of now he is officially still alive. In October 2024, reports suggest he was appointed as a temporary supervisor of Hezbollah’s leadership, indicating Iran's deepening involvement in Lebanon via trusted Quds Force operators.

== Sanctions ==
=== U.S. Sanction ===
Office of Foreign Assets Control (OFAC) designated him as a Specially Designated National (SDN) under these programs: IFSR, IRGC, and SDGT, linking him to the IRGC‐Qods Force. The sanctions were issued under Executive Order 13224, with risks of secondary sanctions under EO 13886. The U.S. Treasury highlighted his role in managing multi‑billion dollar IRGC‑Qods operations abroad, overseeing Syria, Iraq, and Lebanon proxies. OFAC’s public announcement is dated February 27, 2024.

=== UK Sanctions ===
The UK Government imposed sanctions under the Iran (Sanctions) Regulations 2023 around the same time. Fallahzadeh was listed for his involvement in “hostile activity by an armed group backed by the Government of Iran,” including threats to other nations’ security. The UK's Foreign, Commonwealth & Development Office noted these designations on February 27, 2024, applying travel bans and asset freezes.

== See also ==
- Quds Force
- Islamic Revolutionary Guard Corps
- Qassem Soleimani
- Esmail Qaani
- Hezbollah

Military offices
Preceded by Mohammad Hejazi	Deputy Commander of Quds Force; 18 April 2021–present	Incumbent
Preceded by Asghar Sabouri	Deputy Coordinator of Quds Force; 2018–2021	Succeeded by Mohammad-Hadi Haj Rahimi
Preceded by Abdol-Reza Abed	Commander of Quds Karbala Headquarters; 2005–2007	Succeeded by Ebadollah Abdollahi
Preceded by Gholamreza Soleimani	Commander of the 19th Fajr Division; 2004–2005	Succeeded by Gholamhossein Gheybparvar
Preceded by ?	Commander of the 18th Al-Ghadir Brigade ?–2004	Succeeded by Saeed Gahari
Government offices
Preceded by Abolghasem Asi (acting)	Governor of Yazd province 19 August 2007–30 October 2013	Succeeded by Mohammad MirMohammadi
