= Mohammad Hejazi =

Military commander in Iran's Islamic Revolutionary Guard Corps (1956–2021)

Sardar Sayyid Mohammad Hejazi
- محمد حجازی
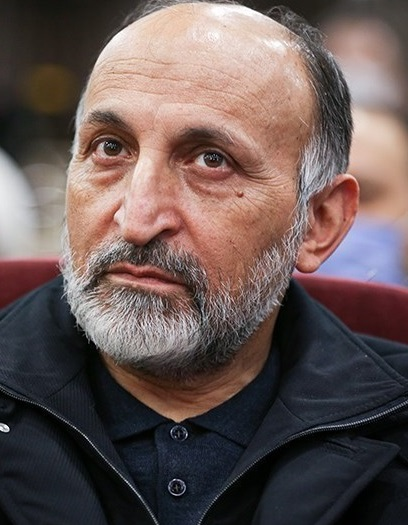
- Hejazi in 2021
- Born: Mohammad Hossein-Zadeh Hejazi; 20 January 1956; Isfahan, Pahlavi Iran
- Died: 18 April 2021 (aged 65); Tehran, Iran
- Burial place: Golestan Shohada of Isfahan
- Education: University of Tehran; University of Isfahan; Supreme National Defense University
- Military career
- Allegiance: Iran
- Branch: Islamic Revolutionary Guard Corps
- Service years: 1980–2021
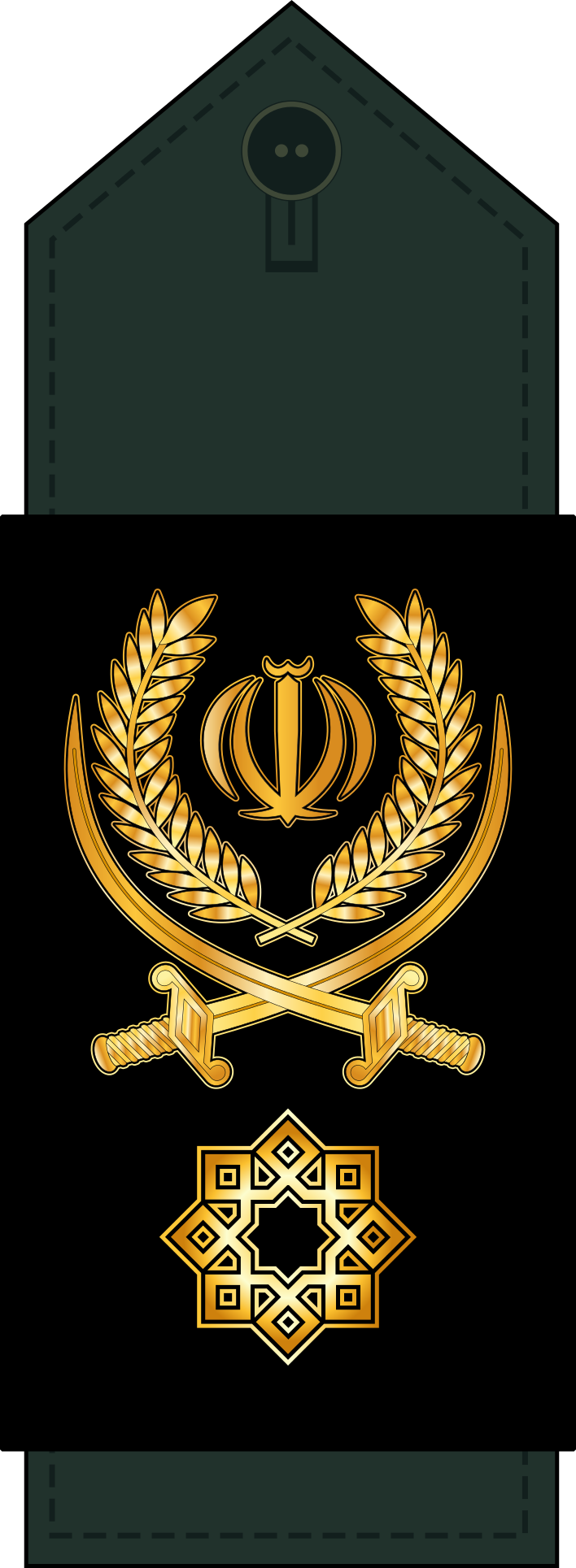
- Rank: Brigadier General
- Unit: Quds Force
- Commands: Deputy Commander of the Quds Force (2020–2021); Deputy for Logistics, Support, and Industrial Research of the General Staff of the Armed Forces (2009–2014); Thar-Allah Headquarters (2008–2009); Deputy Commander-in-Chief of the IRGC (2008–2009); Deputy Coordinator of the IRGC (2008); Joint Staff (2007–2008); Basij (1998–2007); Deputy Coordinator of the Basij (1994–1998); Quds Headquarters (1988); Deputy Commander of Quds Headquarters (1987–1988)
- Conflicts: 1979 Kurdish Rebellion; Iran–Iraq War; Insurgency in Sistan and Balochistan; Syrian civil war; Iranian intervention in Syria; War in Iraq (2013–2017); Iranian intervention in Iraq; 2019–2021 Persian Gulf crisis

Mohammad Hossein-Zadeh Hejazi (Persian: محمد حسین‌زاده حجازی, 20 January 1956 – 18 April 2021) was an Iranian Brigadier General in the Islamic Revolutionary Guard Corps. He served as Deputy Commander in Chief of the Islamic Revolutionary Guard Corps from 2008 to 2009 under the presidency of Mahmoud Ahmadinejad. Hejazi previously served as the commnder of the Basij from 1998 to 2007.

== Early life and education ==
Hejazi was born in Isfahan in 1956. He attended the University of Tehran.

== Career ==
Hejazi became a member of the Islamic Revolutionary Guard Corps in May 1979. He served as the intelligence and security advisor to the Supreme Leader Ali Khamenei. He was a former commander of Basij, the auxiliary paramilitary branch of the Islamic Revolutionary Guards Corps. On 3 January 2020, he became the Deputy Commander of the Quds Force, by decree of the Supreme Leader, Ali Khamenei.

=== Allegations ===
It is alleged by the American Jewish Committee that Hejazi, while serving as an advisor to Khamanei, attended a meeting in August 1993 to plan the AMIA bombing in Argentina along with Khamanei, Rafsanjani, then president, Ali Fallahian, then intelligence minister, and Ali Akbar Velayati, then foreign minister.

The subject was the deputy commander of the Islamic Revolutionary Guard Corps in 2008 and the commander of Thar-Allah Headquarters whose units were central to the government efforts to combat the 2009 Iranian presidential election protests.

== Sanctions ==
In 2010, the United States Department of State had placed Hejazi on its sanctions list. Similarly, the European Union also sanctioned him in October 2011 for playing a "central role in the post-election crackdown."

== Death ==
Hejazi died on 18 April 2021. His death was initially announced as being due to a heart condition, although later reports suggested that he died from complications of a chemical weapons injury he had sustained during the Iran–Iraq War.

Military offices
Preceded by Esmail Qaani	Deputy Commander of the Quds Force; 3 January 2020 – 18 April 2021	Succeeded by Mohammad Reza Fallahzadeh
Preceded by Mohammad Reza Naqdi	Vice Chief of the General Staff of Iranian Armed Forces for Readiness, Logistics and Industrial Research; 2009–2014	Succeeded by Ali Abdollahi
Preceded by Morteza Rezaee	Deputy Commander-in-Chief of the IRGC; 22 May 2008 – 4 October 2009	Succeeded by Hossein Salami
Preceded by himself as Chairman of the Joint Staff	Deputy Coordinator of the IRGC; 26 February 2008 – 22 May 2008	Succeeded by Jamaladdin Aberoumand
Preceded by Ali Akbar Ahmadian	Chairman of the Joint Staff of the Revolutionary Guards; 20 September 2007 – 26 February 2008	Staff disestablished
Preceded by Alireza Afshar	Commander of the Basij Mobilisation Force; 11 March 1998 – 20 September 2007	Succeeded by Hossein Taeb
Preceded by ?	Deputy Coordinator of the Basij Mobilisation Force; 1994–1997	Succeeded by ?
Preceded by Mohammad Ali Jafari	Acting Commander of Quds Headquarters; 1988	Succeeded by Qasem Soleimani
Preceded by Gholam-Hossein Bashardoust	Deputy Commander of Quds Headquarters; 1987–1988	Succeeded by ?
