= Hossein Alaei =

Iranian retired military officer

Sardar Hossein Alaei
- حسین علایی
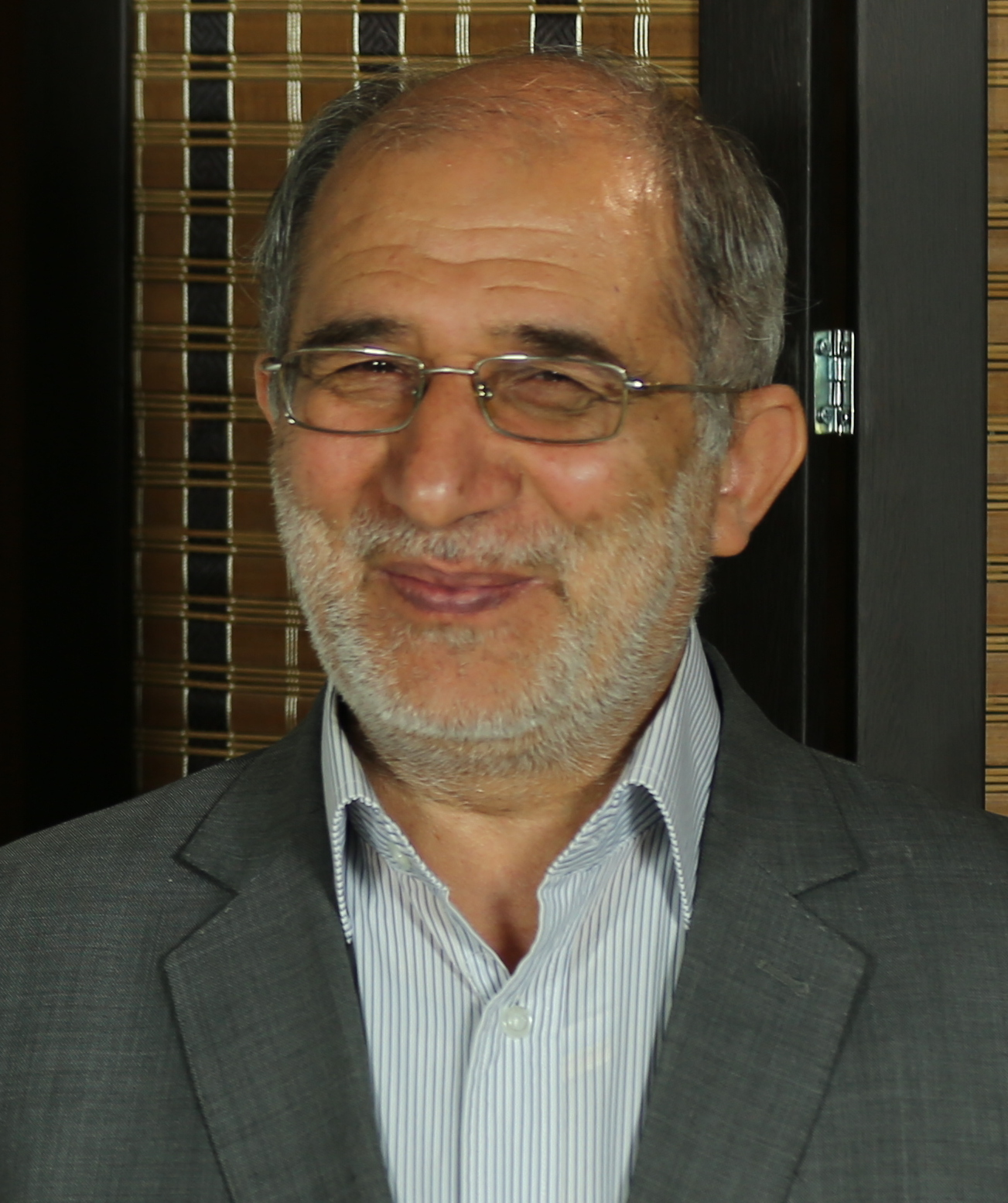
- Allaee in 2017

CEO of the Steel Employees Retirement Fund
- In office 2024–2025
- Preceded by: Seyyed Hojjat Kazemi
- Succeeded by: Alaeddin Azouji

Chairman of the Board of the National Iranian Tanker Company
- In office 2018–2023
- Preceded by: Seyyed Ahmad Moghimi
- Succeeded by: Mohammad Shahonvand

CEO of Iran Aseman Airlines
- In office 28 October 1985 – 29 August 1989
- Preceded by: Abbas Rahmatiyan
- Succeeded by: Mohammad Gorji

Head of Iran Aviation Industries Organization
- In office 2001–2005
- President: Mohammad Khatami
- Supreme Leader: Ali Khamenei
- Preceded by: Mohammad Hassan Tavallaei
- Succeeded by: Seyyed Majid Hedayatzadeh

Chief of Joint Staff of IRGC
- In office 1997–2000
- President: Mohammad Khatami
- Supreme Leader: Ali Khamenei
- Preceded by: Mohammad Bagher Zolghadr
- Succeeded by: Ali Akbar Ahmadian

Deputy Minister of Defense
- In office 1991–1992
- President: Akbar Hashemi Rafsanjani
- Supreme Leader: Ali Khamenei
- Preceded by: Mahmoud Pakravan
- Succeeded by: Mohammad Hassan Tavallaei

1st Commander of the IRGC Navy
- In office 17 September 1985 – 23 December 1990
- President: Ali Khamenei; Akbar Hashemi Rafsanjani
- Supreme Leader: Ruhollah Khomeini; Ali Khamenei
- Preceded by: Office Established
- Succeeded by: Ali Shamkhani

Commander of the Noah-e Nabi Headquarters
- In office 1983–1986
- President: Ali Khamenei
- Prime Minister: Mir-Hossein Mousavi
- Supreme Leader: Ruhollah Khomeini
- Preceded by: Abdulhamid Mallahzadeh
- Succeeded by: ?

Personal details
- Born: 1956 (age 69–70) Karahrud, Arak, Markazi, Pahlavi Iran

Military service
- Allegiance: Iran
- Branch/service: IRGC
- Years of service: 1979–2005
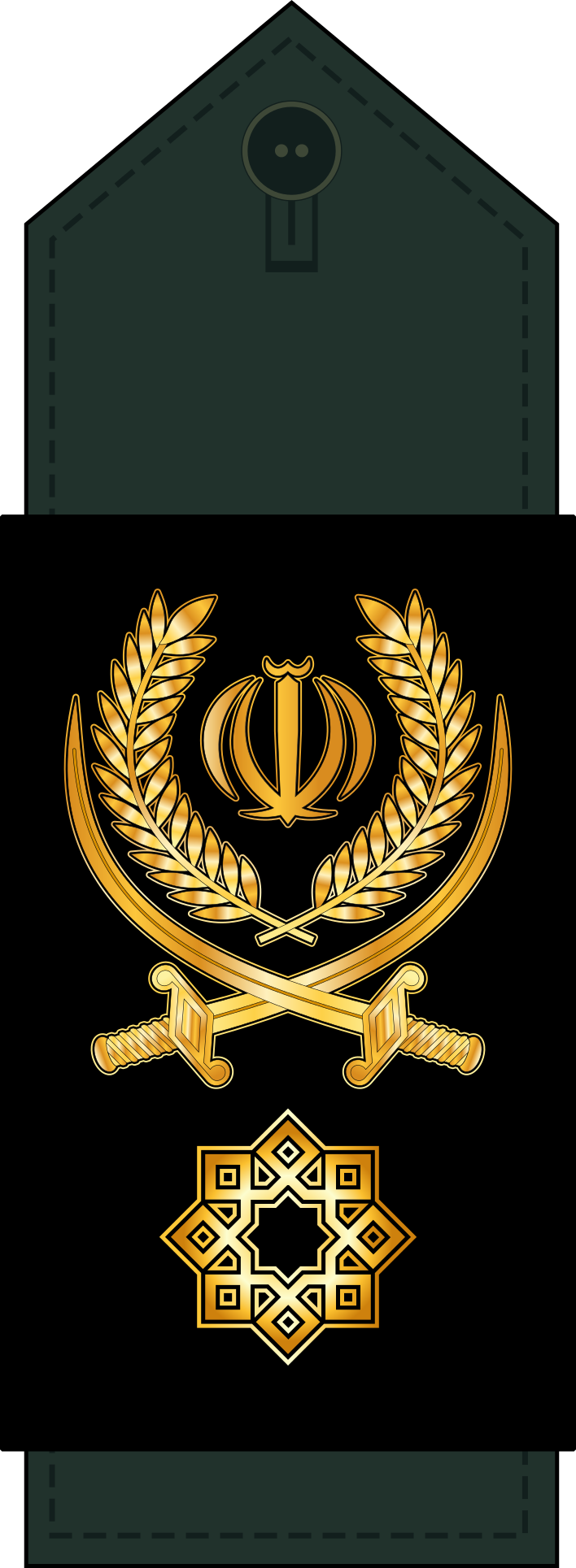
- Rank: Brigadier General
- Battles/wars: Iran–Iraq War

Hossein Alaei (Persian: حسین علایی) is an Iranian retired military officer who was the CEO of Iran Aseman Airlines from 2013 to 2018. During his military career, Alaei was among senior Islamic Revolutionary Guard Corps commanders, having been its commander in two northwestern provinces, Karbala HQ, maritime forces and the joint staff. He was also defense minister's deputy in the 1990s and early 2000s.

In 2013, Alaei was Hassan Rouhani's first choice for minister of defense, however he was reportedly rejected by the Supreme Leader Ali Khamenei.

Business positions
| Preceded by Abbas Rahmatian | Chief Executive Officer of Iran Aseman Airlines; 2013–2018 | Succeeded by Mohammad Gorji |
Military offices
| Preceded by Mohammad Bagher Zolghadr | Chairman of the Joint Staff of the Islamic Revolutionary Guard Corps; 1997–2000 | Succeeded by Ali Akbar Ahmadian |
| New title Branch created | Commander of the Navy of the Islamic Revolutionary Guard Corps; 1985–1990 | Succeeded by Ali Shamkhani |
