= Nasser Shabani =

Iranian general (c.1957–2020)

Sardar Nasser Shabani
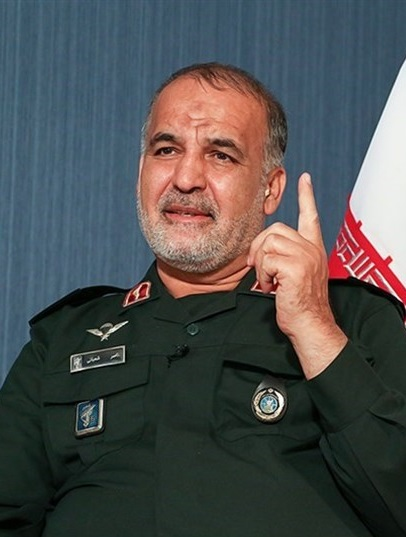
- Born: c. 1957; Imperial State of Iran
- Died: 13 March 2020 (aged 62–63); Iran
- Military career
- Allegiance: Iran
- Branch: Islamic Revolutionary Guard Corps
- Service years: 1982–2020
- Rank: Brigadier general
- Unit: Quds Force
- Commands: Imam Hossein University
- Conflicts: Amol conflict; Iran–Iraq War

Nasser Shabani (Persian: ناصر شعبانی; c. 1957 – 13 March 2020) was an Iranian general and senior commander of Islamic Revolutionary Guard Corps (IRGC). He took credit for using Houthi rebels to target Saudi oil tankers.

== Career ==
Shabani began his military career in 1982 during the Iran–Iraq War. He participated in suppressing the Amol uprising the same year. In the final year of the Iran–Iraq War, he was promoted to become one of several fronts of Islamic Revolutionary Guard Corps. He played a key role in Operation Mersad, and later wrote several books about the war. In 2011, he succeeded the president of the university of Imam Hussein and became one of the deputies of the Sar-Allah Headquarters.

In 2018, he stated in Iranian state media that the IRGC ordered the Houthi forces in Yemen to attack two Saudi oil tankers on the Bab al-Mandab Strait.

== Death ==
Shabani died from COVID-19 on 13 March 2020.
