= Mohammad Reza Naqdi =

Commander of Basij paramilitary force of Islamic Republic of Iran

Sardar Mohammad Reza Naqdi
- محمدرضا نقدی
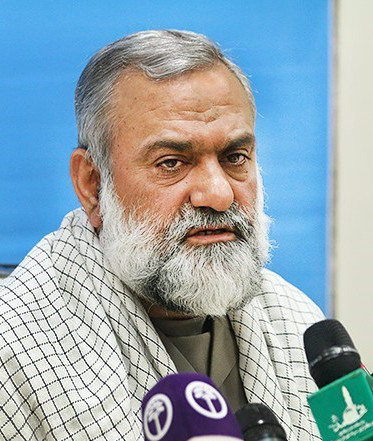
- Naghdi in the 2nd conference of the 'Supreme Assembly of Basij', December 2015

Deputy Coordinator of the Islamic Revolutionary Guard Corps
- In office 16 May 2019 – 26 October 2025
- President: Hassan Rouhani; Ebrahim Raisi; Mohammad Mokhber (acting); Masoud Pezeshkian
- Supreme Leader: Ali Khamenei
- Preceded by: Ali Fadavi
- Succeeded by: Seyyed Hojatollah Qureishi

Deputy Commander-in-chief of the IRGC for Cultural and Social affairs
- In office 7 December 2016 – 16 May 2019
- President: Hassan Rouhani
- Supreme Leader: Ali Khamenei
- Preceded by: Hossein Nejat
- Succeeded by: Hossein Nejat

Commander of the Basij
- In office 4 October 2009 – 7 December 2016
- President: Mahmoud Ahmadinejad; Hassan Rouhani
- Supreme Leader: Ali Khamenei
- Preceded by: Hossein Taeb
- Succeeded by: Gholamhossein Gheybparvar

Head of the Central Headquarters for Combating Goods and Currency Smuggling
- In office 2 November 2005 – 16 June 2007
- Appointed by: Ali Khamenei
- President: Mahmoud Ahmadinejad
- Supreme Leader: Ali Khamenei
- Preceded by: Gholam-Hossein Elham
- Succeeded by: Mohammad Bagher Ghalibaf

Head of the National Organization for Passive Defense
- In office 2003–2005
- President: Mohammad Khatami; Mahmoud Ahmadinejad
- Supreme Leader: Ali Khamenei
- Preceded by: Office Established
- Succeeded by: Gholamreza Jalali

Deputy for Logistics, Support, and Industrial Research of the General Staff of the Armed Forces
- In office 2000–2009
- President: Mohammad Khatami; Mahmoud Ahmadinejad
- Supreme Leader: Ali Khamenei
- Preceded by: Mohammad Hossein Jalali
- Succeeded by: Mohammad Hejazi

Chief of the Intelligence Protection Organization of Law Enforcement
- In office 27 June 2000 – 28 June 2005
- President: Mohammad Khatami
- Supreme Leader: Ali Khamenei
- Preceded by: Reza Seifollahi
- Succeeded by: Gholam-Hossein Ramezani

Personal details
- Born: c. 1952 (age 73–74) or 1961 (age 64–65) Najaf, Kingdom of Iraq or Tehran, Pahlavi Iran
- Nickname: Shams

Military service
- Allegiance: Iran
- Branch/service: IRGC; Police Command (1990s); Badr Brigades
- Years of service: 1981–present
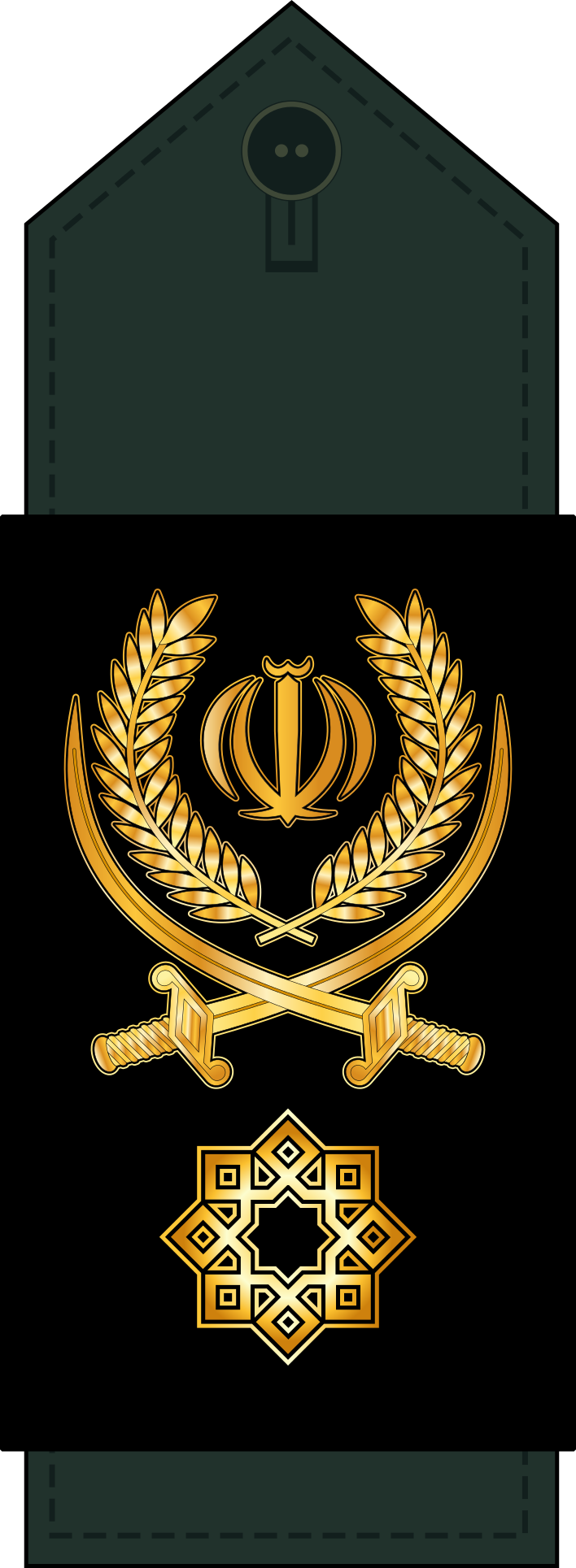
- Rank: Brigadier General
- Unit: Quds Force (1980s); Basij (2009–2016); Ground Forces (2009–present)
- Commands: 9th Badr Divison (1986–1989); Chief of staff Ramadan Headquarters (1983–1986)
- Battles/wars: Iran–Iraq War; Yugoslav Wars; Bosnian War; Insurgency in Sistan and Balochistan; Syrian civil war; Iranian intervention in Syria; War in Iraq (2013–2017); Iranian intervention in Iraq; Iran–PJAK conflict; Western Iran clashes; 2019–2021 Persian Gulf crisis; 2024 Iran–Israel conflict; Twelve-Day War

Mohammad Reza Naqdi (also spelled "Naghdi"; Persian: محمدرضا نقدی) is an Iranian military officer who is a senior officer in the IRGC.

== Background ==
According to the biography published by the semi-official Fars News Agency, Naqdi was born in March 1961 in a Middle class religious family in Shapour neighbourhood of Tehran. Aging 16, he enrolled in University of Guilan in 1977 and co-founded its Anjoman-e Eslami. He helped founding Jihad of Construction in June 1979, before joining the Revolutionary Guards Intelligence Unit.

Al Majalla claims that Naqdi is an Iraqi national of Iranian origin and the son of a Shiite cleric named Ali Akbar Thamahniy Shams, who was expelled from Iraq in 1980 among convoys of Moaveds and was placed in the city of Naqadeh with his family. He was allegedly affiliated with the Islamic Supreme Council of Iraq.

== Career ==
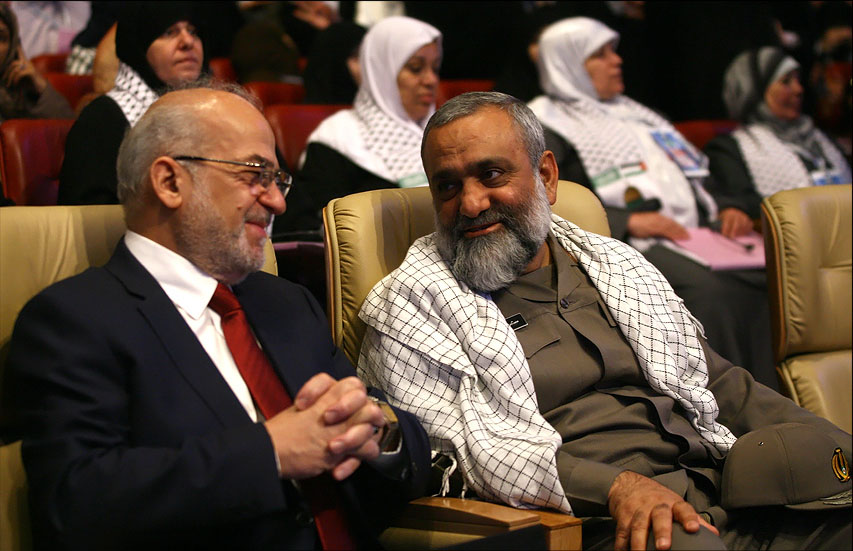
Naqdi with Ibrahim al-Jaafari in July 2012

According to some sources, he commanded the Quds Force detachment along with Hossein Allahkaram during the Bosnian War.

Earlier in his career Naqdi served as the Iranian Police Force's Counter-Intelligence Chief and is also reported to have been involved in "crackdowns" during the 1997-2005 administration of Khatami including the 1999 student protests. Amnesty International reported that in March 1999 Iranian authorities announced that General Naqdi, chief of police intelligence at the time, to be tried in May by a military court along with 10 of his subordinates. "The charges against them are believed to include 'unlawful arrest' and 'using torture to elicit confessions'." He was found not guilty.

Naqdi was appointed by Supreme Leader Ali Khamenei as commander of the Basij in October 2009, replacing Hossein Taeb. He has been described as possessing "conservative credentials" and his appointment was said (by Mohsen Sazegara) to have "shattered the hopes and plans of those who thought they could ease" the unrest and protest following the reelection of President Ahmadinejad.

=== 2009 protests ===
On 14 February 2011 Naqdi was quoted by the semi-official Fars News Agency as saying he believed the February protests in Iran had been started by "western spies" and that "western intelligence agencies are searching for a mentally challenged person who can set himself on fire in Tehran to trigger developments like those in Egypt and Tunisia." Naqdi was also quoted as saying the basij were "ready to sacrifice their lives" to defend the Islamic regime, and likened the opposition to the "party of Satan."

Two weeks later on 23 February 2011, the US Treasury Department imposed sanctions on General Naqdi, "for being responsible for or complicit in serious human rights abuses in Iran", adding him to the Office of Foreign Assets Control blacklist. The action subjects him "to visa sanctions" and "seeks to block any assets" he may have under U.S. jurisdiction, and "bans U.S. citizens from financial transactions with them".

== Views ==
=== Israel ===
In 2011 Naqdi called on Israeli citizens to leave the region voluntarily. He said, "We recommend them to pack their furniture and return to their countries," adding that if they remained, "a time will arrive when they will not even have time to pack their suitcases."

During a 2015 speech Naqdi threatened Israel and declared that an Israeli attack on Hizbullah forces which led to killing of an Iranian revolutionary guard official in Syria will be responded to by liberating of Palestine.

=== COVID-19 ===
After the Supreme leader of Iran ayatollah Ali Khamenei banned the import of British and US vaccines against COVID-19 in January 2021, General Naqdi commented that the ayatollah "does not recommend the injection of any foreign vaccine", because the genetic material (mRNA) it contains instructs cells to produce proteins.

Military offices
Preceded by Ali Fadavi	Deputy Coordinator of the IRGC; 16 May 2019–26 October 2025	Succeeded by Seyyed Hojatollah Qureishi
Preceded by Hossein Nejat	Deputy Commander of Islamic Revolutionary Guard Corps for Cultural and Social Affairs; 2016–2019	Succeeded by Hossein Nejat
Preceded by Hossein Taeb	Commander of Basij; 4 October 2009–7 December 2016	Succeeded by Gholamhossein Gheybparvar
Preceded by Mohammad Hossein Jalali	Deputy Chief of the General Staff of Iranian Armed Forces for Readiness, Logistics and Industrial Research; 2000–2009	Succeeded by Mohammad Hejazi
Preceded by Morteza Ghorbani	Commander of the 9th Badr Divison; 1986–1989	Succeeded by Esmail Daghayeghi
Preceded by New office	Chief of staff Ramadan Headquarters; 1983–1986	Succeeded by Iraj Masjedi
Police appointments
Preceded by Reza Seifollahi	Chief of the Intelligence Protection Organization of Law Enforcement; 27 June 2000–28 June 2005	Succeeded by Gholam-Hossein Ramezani
Government offices
Preceded by Gholam-Hossein Elham	Commissioner of the President of Iran; Head of the Headquarters for Fighting the Smuggling of Goods and Currency; 2 November 2005–16 June 2007	Succeeded by Mohammad Bagher Ghalibaf
Preceded by New office	head of the National Organization for Passive Defense; 2003–2005	Succeeded by Gholamreza Jalali
