= Esmaeil Kousari =

Iranian military officer and politician

Sardar Esmaeil Kowsari
- اسماعیل کوثری
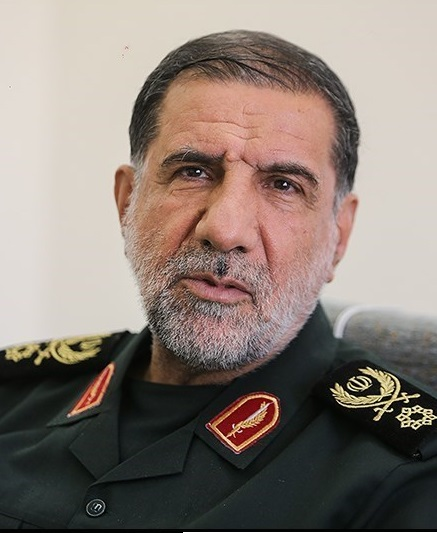
- Kousari in 2018

Member of the Parliament of Iran
- Incumbent
- Assumed office 27 July 2021
- President: Ebrahim Raisi; Mohammad Mokhber (acting); Masoud Pezeshkian
- Supreme Leader: Ali Khamenei; Mojtaba Khamenei
- Constituency: Tehran, Rey, Shemiranat, Eslamshahr and Pardis
- In office 28 May 2008 – 28 May 2016
- President: Mahmoud Ahmadinejad; Hassan Rouhani
- Supreme Leader: Ali Khamenei
- Constituency: Tehran, Rey, Shemiranat, Eslamshahr and Pardis

Commander of Thar-Allah Headquarters
- In office 2 July 2017 – 21 June 2020
- President: Hassan Rouhani
- Supreme Leader: Ali Khamenei
- Preceded by: Mohsen Kazemi
- Succeeded by: Hossein Nejat

Personal details
- Born: c. 1955 (age 70–71) Tehran, Pahlavi Iran
- Party: Front of Islamic Revolution Stability
- Other political affiliations: Principlists Grand Coalition (2016); United Front of Principlists (2008, 2012); Principlists Pervasive Coalition (2008)
- Education: Imam Hossein University

Military service
- Allegiance: Iran
- Branch/service: IRGC
- Years of service: 1980–2008; 2017–2021
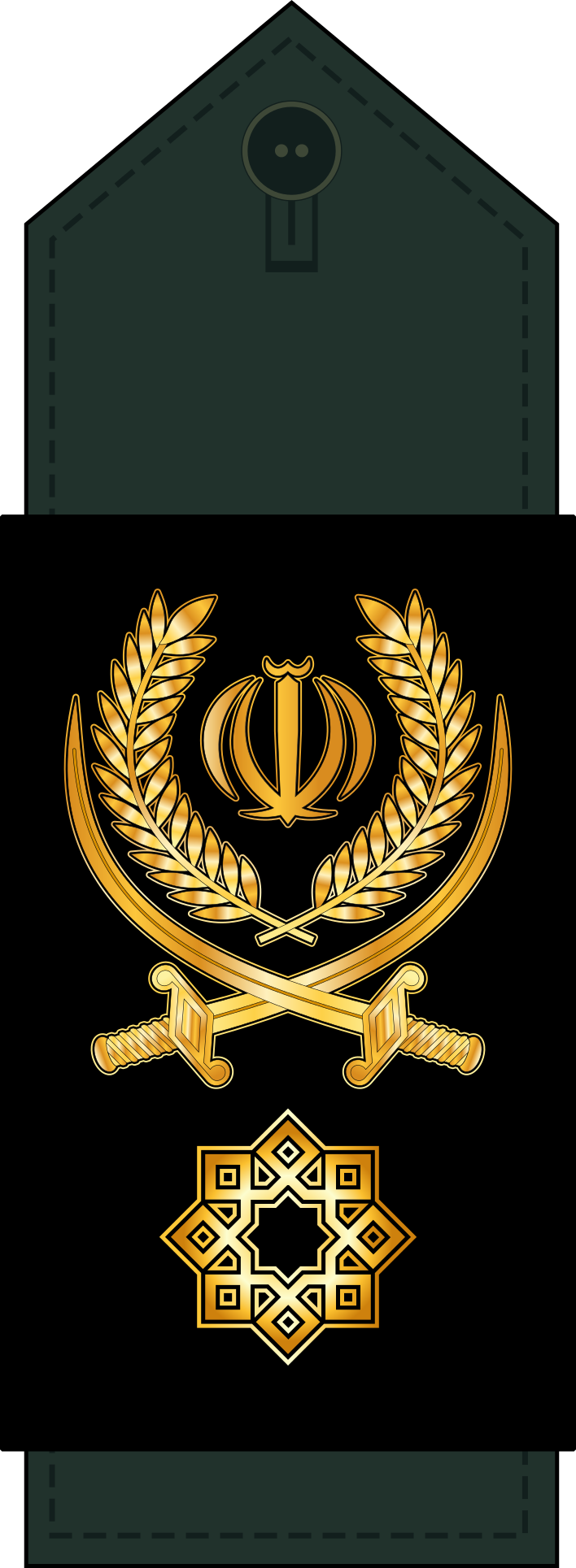
- Rank: Brigadier general
- Commands: 27th Mohammad Rasulullah Division(1984–2000)
- Battles/wars: Iran–Iraq War

Mohammad-Esmaeil Kowsari (Persian: محمداسماعیل کوثری, born 3 March 1955) is an Iranian military officer and principlist politician who was the deputy chief of Tharallah Headquarters, an Islamic Revolutionary Guard Corps unit responsible for maintaining security in Tehran.

Kowsari is currently a member of the Parliament of Iran representing Tehran, Rey, Shemiranat and Eslamshahr since 2021. He was also a member of Iranian Parliament from 2008 to 2016.

As of 2014, he was the head of the Iranian parliament's committee on defense and national security. He was also a special commission for examining the JCPOA member.

== Views ==
He is an outspoken critic of President Hassan Rouhani and his administration, as well as the nuclear negotiations leading to the Joint Comprehensive Plan of Action, terming it "wasting time". Kowsari was among Delvāpaṣ (lit. 'Apprehensive') attendees of the 2014 landmark anti-nuclear deal conference named "We're Worried", held at the former Embassy of the United States, Tehran.

According to The Wall Street Journal, the music on hold for his office telephone is the famous song with the lyrics “America, death to your deceit! The blood of our youth is dripping from your claw”. He called Javad Zarif's handshake with the U.S. President Barack Obama an "unrevolutionary act" and called for his impeachment in October 2015.

Kowsari has rebuked reformists, stating in 2013 that Iranians "fundamentally no longer trust" the faction.
