= Hossein Salami =

Iranian military officer (1960–2025)

Sardar Hossein Salami
- حسین سلامی
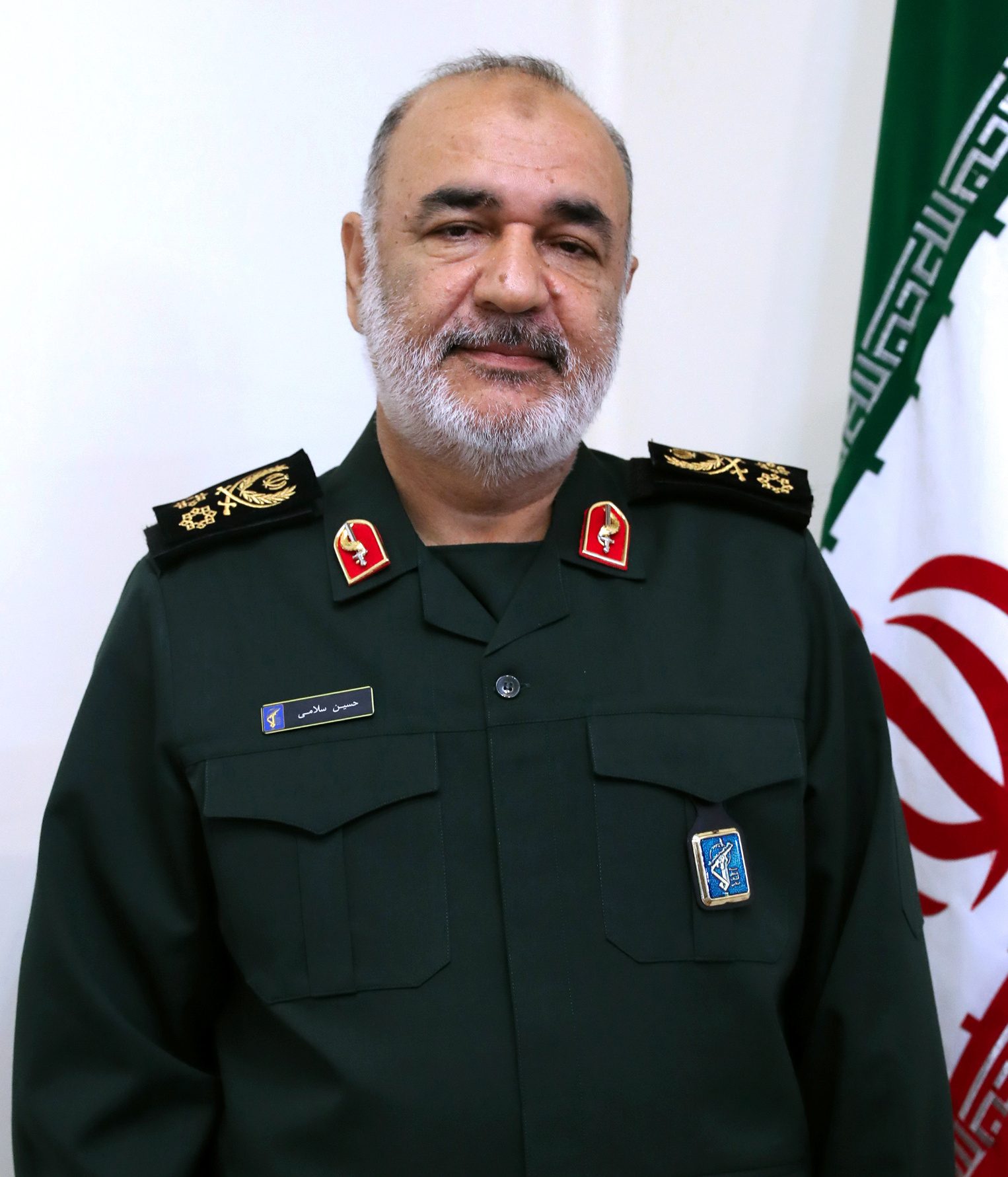
- Salami in 2019

6th Commander-in-Chief of the Islamic Revolutionary Guard Corps
- In office 21 April 2019 – 13 June 2025
- President: Hassan Rouhani; Ebrahim Raisi; Mohammad Mokhber (acting); Masoud Pezeshkian
- Supreme Leader: Ali Khamenei
- Preceded by: Mohammad Ali Jafari
- Succeeded by: Ahmad Vahidi (acting); Mohammad Pakpour

Deputy Commander of the Islamic Revolutionary Guard Corps
- In office 4 October 2009 – 21 April 2019
- President: Mahmoud Ahmadinejad; Hassan Rouhani
- Supreme Leader: Ali Khamenei
- Preceded by: Mohammad Hejazi
- Succeeded by: Ali Fadavi

Deputy Coordinator of the Islamic Revolutionary Guard Corps
- Acting; 18 July 2018 – 23 August 2018
- President: Hassan Rouhani
- Supreme Leader: Ali Khamenei
- Preceded by: Jamaladdin Aberoumand
- Succeeded by: Ali Fadavi

Commander of the IRGC Aerospace Force
- In office 21 January 2006 – 4 October 2009
- President: Mahmoud Ahmadinejad
- Supreme Leader: Ali Khamenei
- Preceded by: Mohammad Reza Zahedi
- Succeeded by: Amir Ali Hajizadeh

Deputy Chief of Joint Staff of the IRGC
- In office 20 November 2005 – 21 January 2006
- President: Akbar Hashemi Rafsanjani
- Supreme Leader: Ali Khamenei
- Preceded by: Ali Shamshiri
- Succeeded by: Hossein Zarif-Manesh

Head of the Operations Department of the IRGC Joint Staff
- In office 1997–2005
- President: Mohammad Khatami; Mahmoud Ahmadinejad
- Supreme Leader: Ali Khamenei
- Preceded by: ?
- Succeeded by: Ali Fadli

Director of the University of Command and Staff
- In office 1992–1997
- President: Akbar Hashemi Rafsanjani
- Supreme Leader: Ali Khamenei
- Preceded by: Office Established
- Succeeded by: Amir Hayat Moghadam

Personal details
- Born: 1 August 1960 Golpayegan, Pahlavi Iran
- Died: 13 June 2025 (aged 64) Tehran, Iran
- Cause of death: Airstrike
- Awards: Order of Fath (1st class)

Military service
- Allegiance: Iran
- Branch/service: IRGC
- Years of service: 1980–2025
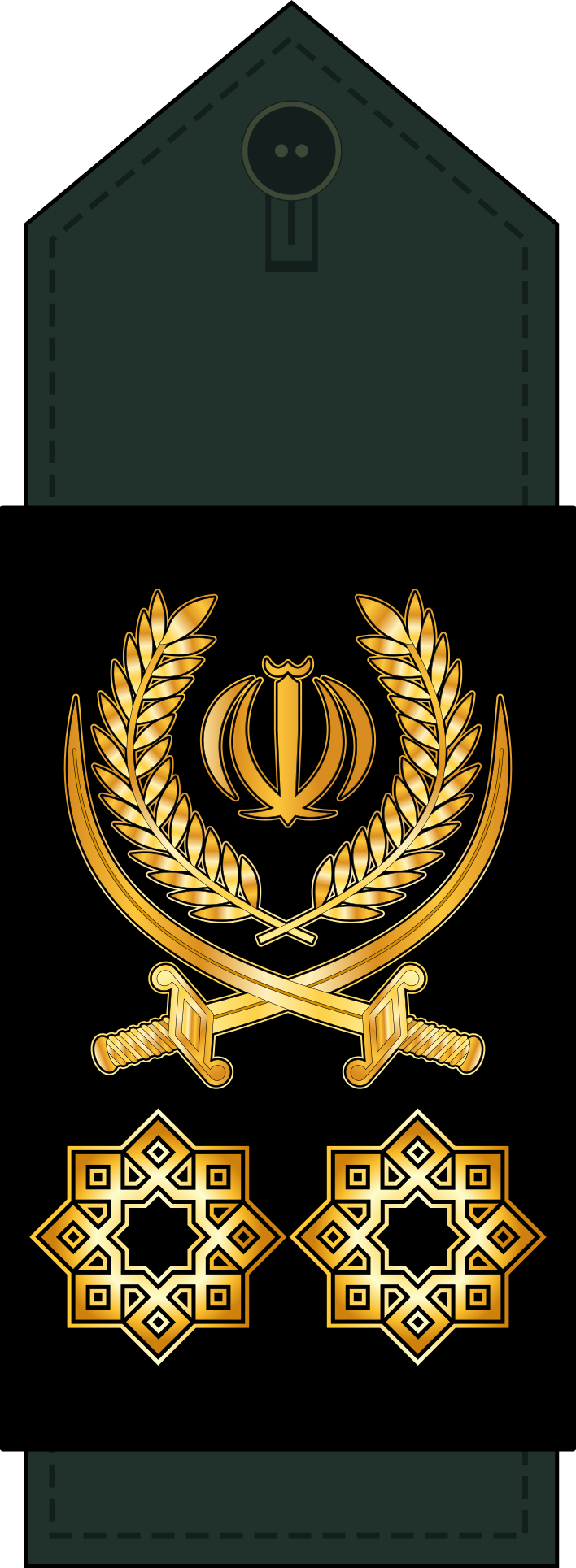
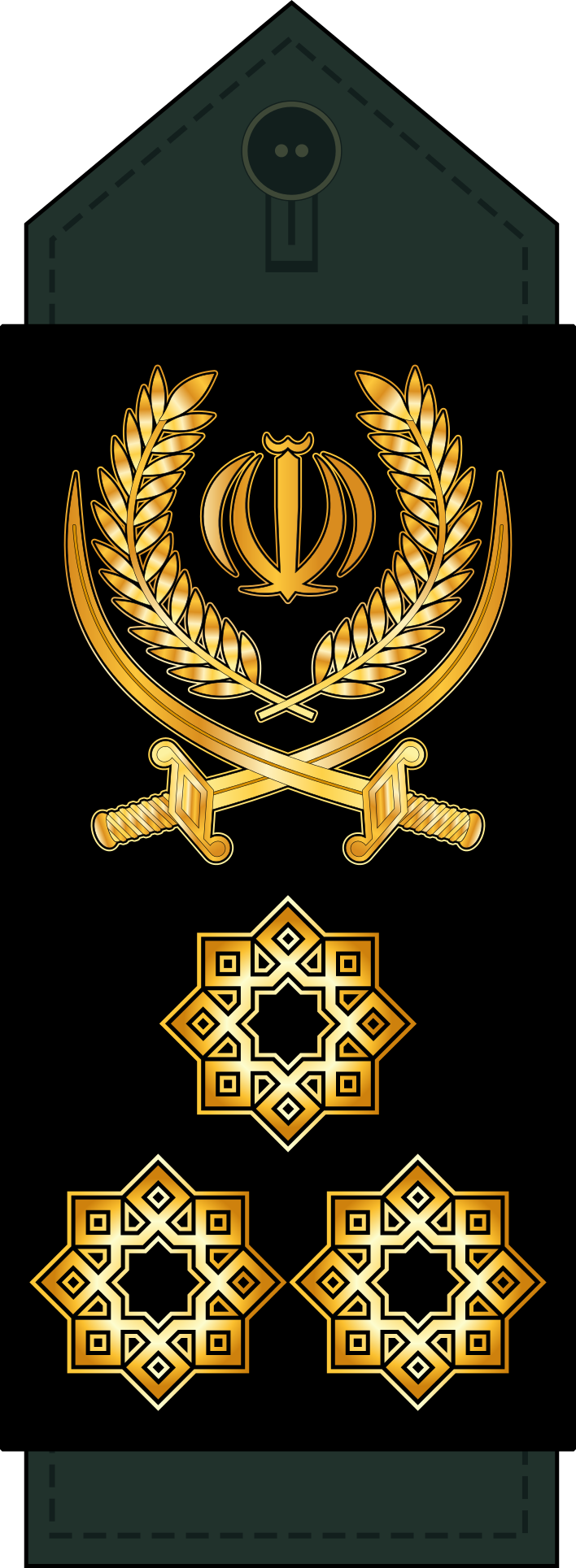
- Rank: Major General; Lieutenant General (posthumously)
- Unit: Aerospace Force
- Battles/wars: Iran–Iraq War; War in Afghanistan (2001–2021); 2001 uprising in Herat; Insurgency in Sistan and Balochistan; Syrian civil war; Iranian intervention in the Syria; War in Iraq (2013–2017); Iranian intervention in Iraq; Iran–PJAK conflict; Western Iran clashes; 2019–2021 Persian Gulf crisis; 2024 Iran–Israel conflict; Twelve-Day War X

Hossein Salami (Persian: حسین سلامی; 1 August 1960 – 13 June 2025) was an Iranian military officer who served as the commander-in-chief of the Islamic Revolutionary Guard Corps (IRGC) from 2019 until 2025, when he was killed by an Israeli airstrike during the Twelve-Day War in June.

Salami joined the IRGC during the Iran–Iraq War in 1980, when he was a college student. He rose through the ranks, becoming deputy commander. On 21 April 2019, the supreme leader of Iran, Ali Khamenei, appointed him as the new Commander-in-Chief of the IRGC, replacing Major General Mohammad Ali Jafari. Salami stood out among the commanders of the IRGC for his fiery and aggressive speeches targeting the US, Israel, and Saudi Arabia.

== Early life and education ==
Hossein Salami was born in 1960 in Golpayegan, Isfahan province, then part of the Imperial State of Iran.

In 1978, he was accepted to the mechanical engineering department at the Iran University of Science and Technology. When the Iran–Iraq War started, he joined the IRGC. After the war ended, he returned to his college studies and graduated with a master's degree in defense management.

Hossein Salami held a Ph.D. in National Defense Management from the Iranian Army Command and General Staff College. He also completed specialized missile courses at Malek-Ashtar University.

== Career ==
After joining the IRGC when the Iran–Iraq War started in 1980, Salami rose through the ranks, becoming deputy commander.

In January 2019, Salami said: "We will fight them on the global level, not just in one spot. Our war is not a local war. We have plans to defeat the world powers".

On 21 April 2019, Ali Khamenei appointed him as the new commander-in-chief of the IRGC, replacing Mohammad Ali Jafari, who had held the post since September 2007.

On 7 January 2020, Salami spoke at the funeral of his comrade in arms and IRGC Quds Force subordinate, Qasem Soleimani, who had been killed the previous Friday near Iraq's Baghdad International Airport by a US airstrike: "I say the last word at the beginning: we will take revenge... a revenge that will be tough, strong, decisive and finishing, and will make them regret".

In the matter of 8 January 2020 shootdown of Ukraine International Airlines flight PS752 by IRGC missiles, killing 176 people, on 13 January Salami went to the Parliament of Iran and said,

We did make a mistake. Some of our compatriots were martyred because of our mistake but it was unintentional... In my all lifetime I haven't been as sorry as much as now. Never... I wish I had been on board and burned with them... May God forgive us and then after that the Iranian people and the families of the victims.

In the aftermath of the April 2024 Iranian strikes on Israel, Salami stated,

Our information on all of the hits is not complete yet but on that part of the hits that we have accurate, documented and field-related reports show that this operation has been carried out with a success that exceeded the expectation.

One Negev Bedouin civilian was critically injured by shrapnel, and 31 others were treated for minor injuries or post-traumatic stress.

=== Executive Background ===
From 1999 to 2008, Salami served as Deputy Commander of Islamic Revolutionary Guard Corps Aerospace Force, playing key role in Islamic Republic of Iran missile force development.

=== Missile Program Development ===
He directly supervised ballistic projects including “Shahab-3” and “Qadr” missiles, achieving 2000 km missile range under his command.

=== Publications ===
His works include book “Deterrence Strategy in Sacred Defense” and article “Missiles’ Role in National Security”.

== Timeline of responsibilities ==
- Commander of IRGC University of Command and Staff (1992–1997)
- Head of the Operations Department of the IRGC Joint Staff (1997–2005)
- Deputy Chief of the IRGC Joint Staff (2005–2006)
- Commander of IRGC Air Force (2006–2009)
- Deputy commander of Islamic Revolutionary Guard Corps (2009–2019)
- Commander-in-chief of the IRGC (2019–2025)
- Professor of the Supreme National Defense University (as of 2019)

== Honours and awards ==
On 10 March 2024, Salami was awarded an Order of Fath medal (also known as the Victory Medal), by Supreme Leader Ali Khamenei, for "improving the defence, combat, and deterrence power" of the Iranian armed forces. A medal was also awarded to Major General Abdolrahim Mousavi, chief commander of the Iranian Army, on the same day.

== Sanctions ==
On 23 December he was included in the list of individuals designated for sanctions under U.N. security council resolution 1737, which imposed sanctions on individuals and entities involved in Iran's ballistic missile program.

According to the United Nations Security Council Resolution 1747, sanctions were imposed on Salami in March 2007.

On 8 April 2019, the United States inflicted economic and travel sanctions on the IRGC and organizations, companies, and individuals affiliated with them. Salami said the IRGC was proud that Washington named them as a terrorist group. It was later remarked that Salami was included on the sanctions list as he had been promoted on 21 April commander of the IRGC. On 2021 the European Union imposed sanctions on Salami in connection with his role during the November 2019 protests in Iran. The sanctions were part of a broader response to reported human rights violations during the unrest.

On 3 October 2022, Salami was included in a Canadian sanctions list that included 9 Iranian entities, and 25 senior officials. The sanctions came in reaction to the Death of Mahsa Amini, and the persecution of protestors in the widescale protests that ensued. In 2023, the European Union added Major General Hossien Salami to its sanctions list under its Iran to Russia military support framework. As commander of the Islamic Revolutionary Guard Corps (IRGC), Salami leads Iran's Unmanned Aerial Vehicle (UAV) program and oversees its international deployment. The EU designation cites his involvement in supplying Iranian UAVs to Russia for its military operations in Ukraine, which according to the report, undermines the country's territorial integrity, sovereignty, and independence. This sanction was enacted under Council Regulation (EU) 2023/1529 and Decision (CFSP) 2023/1532, which specifically target Iran's military support to Russia.

== Political views and style ==
=== Influence ===
According to The Jerusalem Post, Salami played a significant role in shaping Iran's regional strategy. Under his influence, the Iranian regime expanded its activities across the Middle East, including increased involvement in Iraq, military support for the Syrian Government during the Syrian civil war, and backing for Hezbollah. After 2015 Iran also began supporting the Houthis in Yemen, reportedly providing them with missiles and drones used in attacks against Saudi Arabia.

According to researcher Mehdi Khalaji in 2019, Salami used psychological warfare and relied on "innovatively circumventing economic sanctions, developing Iran's missile programme and maintaining the regime's defiant regional policy". According to The Jerusalem Post, Salami was not only a leading military commander but also a public advocate of Iran's strategic stance. He made several high-profile statements emphasizing Iran's capabilities, including remarks in 2019 and 2021 asserting that Iran could destroy Israel.

=== Fiery speeches ===
Salami stood out among the commanders of the IRGC for his fiery and aggressive speeches targeting the US, Israel, and Saudi Arabia. During a speech on Iranian TV in 2019, Salami stated: "We are planning to break America, Israel, and their partners and allies. Our ground forces should cleanse the planet from the filth of their existence".

=== Israel ===
In 2014, Salami declared: "We will chase you [Israelis] house to house and will take revenge for every drop of blood of our martyrs in Palestine, and this is the beginning point of Islamic nations awakening for your defeat." In another speech, he stated that "the Zionist regime is slowly being erased from the world," and predicted that "soon, there will be no such thing as the Zionist regime on Planet Earth."

In a 2018 televised interview, Salami stated: "We announce that if Israel takes any action to wage a war against us, it will definitely lead to its own elimination and the freeing of occupied (Palestinian) territories." In September 2019, Salami stated: "This sinister regime must be wiped off the map and this is no longer... a dream (but) it is an achievable goal."

In November 2023, Salami took part in a rally to protest the Gaza genocide, especially the killing of children in Gaza.

In May 2024, during the Gaza war, Salami said:

Look at the scenes of the crime in Gaza... The United States has targeted the entire Islamic world... Therefore, the path for aggressors to [advance their] dominance must be blocked. Jihad for the liberation of those Muslims who are under the control of the Taghut (polytheists) is the most attractive and most beautiful responsibility and mission for us, the Islamic Revolutionary Guard Corps.

=== Strategic views ===
In a 2023 speech at Tehran University he stated: "Iran's deterrence must reach a level where no country dares to threaten us."

=== Other ===
On 13 January 2020, Salami apologized for shooting down Ukraine International Airlines Flight 752, saying "Never in my life have I felt so ashamed".

On 5 March 2020, Salami said, referencing COVID-19, that "We are now dealing with a biological war." He argued that it "may be the product of American biological warfare." This theory was amplified on 8 March by the state-run Press TV.

In 2022, Salami delivered the following speech at the funeral for victims of a mass shooting by ISIS in Iran. Salami told the Mahsa Amini protests, '"Do not come to the streets. Today is the last day of riots," and blamed Israel and the US for stoking the protests.

== Death ==
Salami was killed in an airstrike during the start of the Twelve-Day War, alongside other top military leaders. The strikes also targeted Iran's nuclear facilities and military installations, on early morning 13 June 2025.

Following his death, the IRGC issued a statement declaring: "Without a doubt, Major General Salami was one of the most distinguished commanders of the Islamic Revolution — present on all fronts of scientific, cultural, security, and military jihad." Ahmad Vahidi was announced as his temporary successor.

== Personal life ==
Salami's brother, Mostafa Salami, is a senior officer in the regular armed force. He is also an authority of Khatam al-Anbiya Construction Headquarters.

== See also ==
- List of Iranian two-star generals since 1979
- Targeted killing by Israel

Military offices
Preceded by Mohammad Ali Jafari	Commander of the Islamic Revolutionary Guard Corps; 21 April 2019–13 June 2025	Succeeded by Mohammad Pakpour
Preceded by Mohammad Hejazi	Deputy Commander of the Islamic Revolutionary Guard Corps; 4 October 2009–21 April 2019	Succeeded by Ali Fadavi
Preceded by Mohammad Reza Zahedi as Commander of Air Force	Commander of the Revolutionary Guards Aerospace Force; 21 January 2006–4 October 2009	Succeeded by Amir Ali Hajizadeh
Preceded by Jamaladdin Aberoumand	Acting Deputy Coordinator of the IRGC; 18 July 2018–23 August 2018	Succeeded by Ali Fadavi
Preceded by Ali Shamshiri	Deputy Chief of Joint Staff of the IRGC; 20 November 2005–21 January 2006	Succeeded by Hossein Zarif-Manesh
Preceded by ?	Head of the Operations Department of the IRGC Joint Staff; 1997–2005	Succeeded by Ali Fadli
New title	Director of the University of Command and Staff; 1992–1997	Succeeded by Amir Hayat Moghadam
