= General Provost of the Islamic Revolutionary Guard Corps =

- دژبان کل سپاه پاسداران انقلاب اسلامی
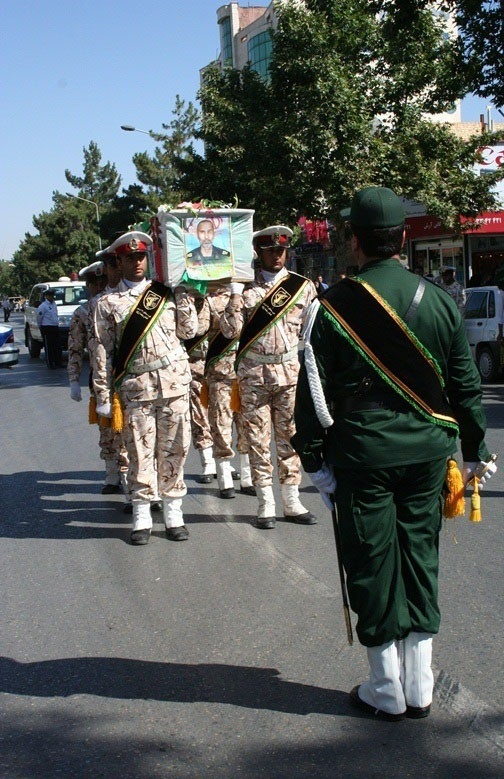
- An honor guard of IRGC Provosts in funeral of a Martyr in 2013.
- Country: Iran
- Branch: General Staff
- Type: Military police
- Role: Provost, honor guard
- Part of: Islamic Revolutionary Guard Corps
- Garrison/HQ: Tehran

Commanders
- Provost marshal: Sardar Sartip II Pasdar Hatam Ebadi

Insignia
- Ceremonial Flag

General Provost of the Islamic Revolutionary Guard Corps (Persian: دژبان کل سپاه پاسداران انقلاب اسلامی) is the provost and military police with an authority within all military branches of the Islamic Revolutionary Guard Corps and Basij militia. It is a subdivision to the Joint Staff of IRGC.
