= Abbas Nilforoushan =

Iranian military commander (1966–2024)

Sardar Abbas Nilforoushan
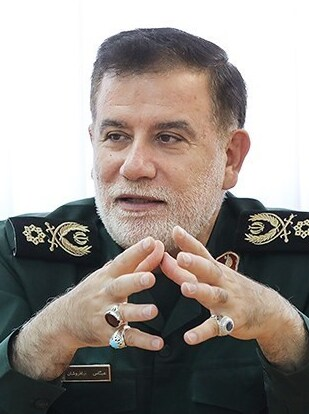
- Nilforoushan in 2019
- Native name: عباس نیلفروشان
- Born: 23 August 1966; Isfahan, Pahlavi Iran
- Died: 27 September 2024 (aged 58) Beirut, Lebanon
- Cause of death: Assassination by airstrike
- Allegiance: Iran
- Branch: Islamic Revolutionary Guard Corps
- Service years: 1980–2024
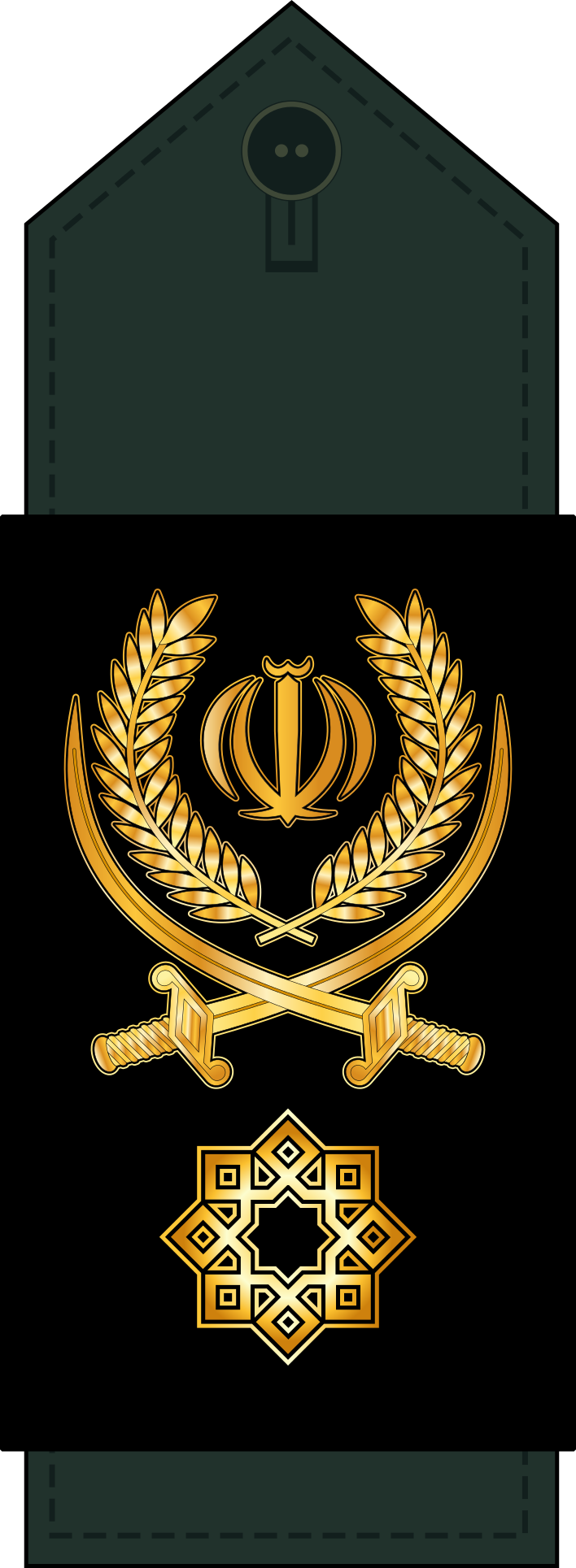
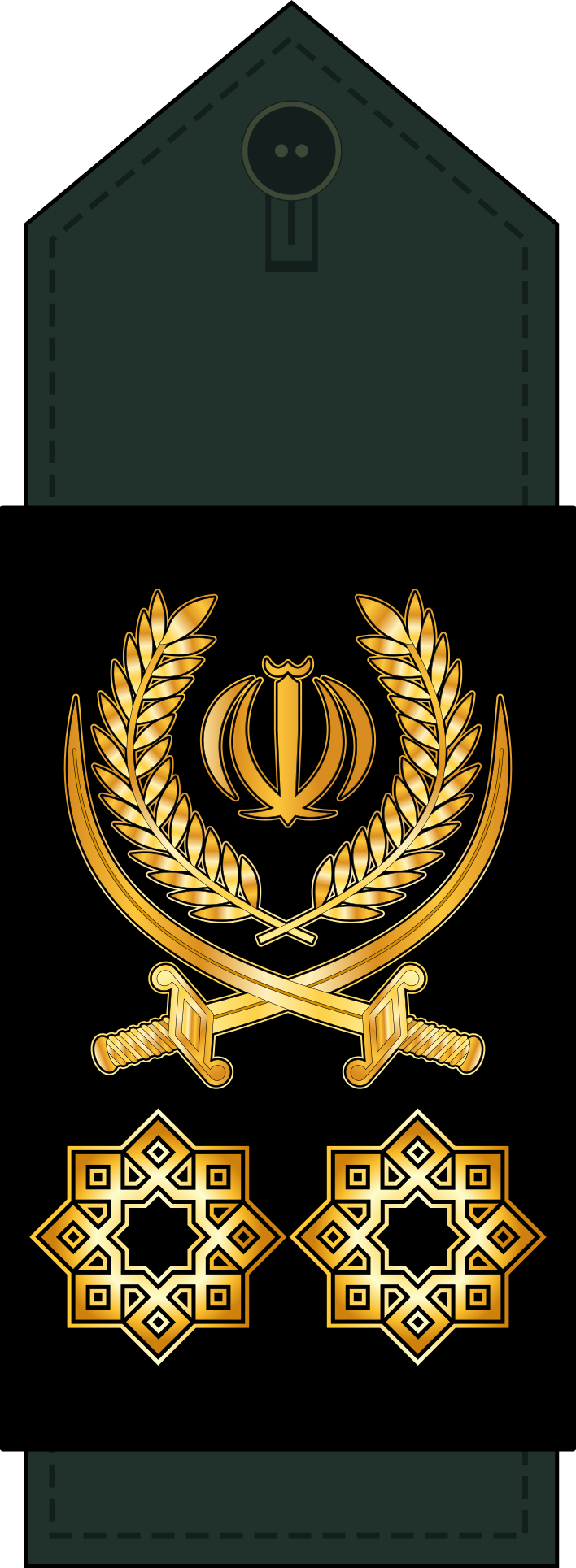
- Rank: Brigadier General; Major General (posthumously)
- Commands: Senior IRGC Military Advisor in Lebanon (2024); Deputy of Operations for the IRGC (2019–2024); Deputy to the IRGC Operations Commander (2016–2019); Head of IRGC University of Command and Staff (2010–2014); Deputy Operations Commander of IRGC Ground Forces (2005–2007)
- Conflicts: Iran–Iraq War; Insurgency in Sistan and Balochistan; Syrian civil war; Iranian intervention in Syria; War in Iraq (2013–2017); Iranian intervention in Iraq; Iran–PJAK conflict; Western Iran clashes; 2024 Iran–Israel conflict †

Abbas Nilforoushan (Persian: عباس نیلفروشان; 23 August 1966 – 27 September 2024) was an Iranian military officer in the Islamic Revolutionary Guard Corps (IRGC), who served as the IRGC's Deputy of Operations. He began his military career at the age 14 in 1980 with the paramilitary Basij, then joined the IRGC and was a member of this organization throughout the Iran–Iraq War.

On 27 September 2024, he was killed in the 2024 Hezbollah headquarters strike together with Hezbollah leader Hassan Nasrallah.

== Early life ==
Abbas Nilforoushan was born in Isfahan, Iran in 1966.

== Military career ==
At the age of 14, Nilforoushan volunteered as a Basij member and went to the western and then southern fronts. During the Iran–Iraq War, he served in various positions in the 14th Imam Hossein Division and the 8th Najaf Ashraf Armored Division, including: platoon commander, company commander, battalion commander, axis commander, and deputy operations commander of the 8th Najaf Division under the command of Ahmad Kazemi.

Previously, his military career included positions such as deputy operations commander of the IRGC Ground Forces, commander of the IRGC Command and Staff College, deputy to the IRGC Commander-in-Chief at the Imam Hussein Headquarters, executive deputy of the IRGC, and deputy operations commander of the IRGC during Brigadier General Mohammad Reza Zahedi's tenure. He had been serving as the deputy operations commander of the IRGC since 2019. He also had five years of experience in Lebanon and Syria on his resume.

Nilforoushan served as the Deputy of Operations for the IRGC Ground Forces from 2005 to 2007. Between 2010 and 2014, he worked as the commander of the IRGC Command and Staff College, and since 2019, he had been the Deputy of Operations for the IRGC. On 26 October 2022, the U.S. Department of the Treasury and the Department of State jointly sanctioned Nilforoushan for his role in suppressing protests in Iran.

== Death ==
On 27 September 2024, Nilforoushan was killed at the main headquarters of the Shia organization Hezbollah by an Israeli airstrike alongside Hezbollah leader Hassan Nasrallah. His remains were repatriated to Iran, with his burial scheduled on 17 October in Isfahan following a series of funeral ceremonies in Tehran, Qom and Mashhad.
