= Hossein Nejat =

Iranian miliary officer

Sardar Hossein Nejat
- حسین نجات
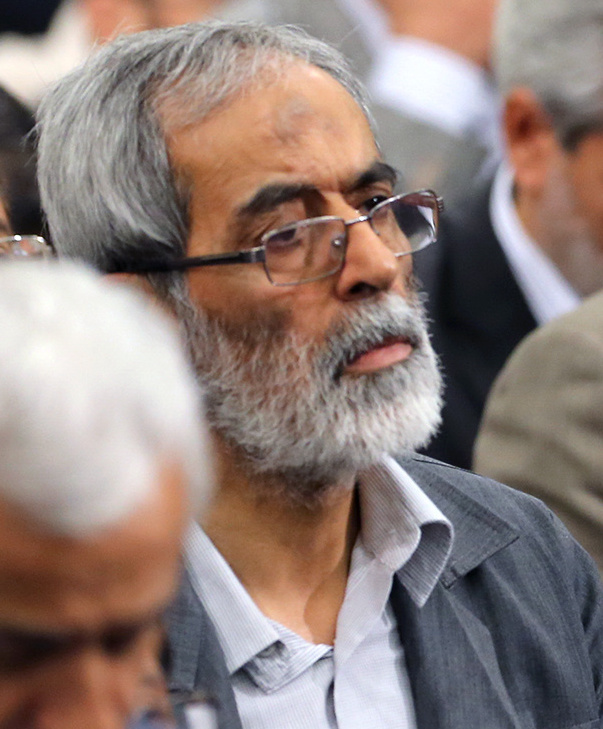
- Nejat in 2017

Commander of Thar-Allah Headquarters
- Incumbent
- Assumed office 21 June 2020
- President: Hassan Rouhani; Ebrahim Raisi; Mohammad Mokhber (acting); Masoud Pezeshkian
- Supreme Leader: Ali Khamenei; Mojtaba Khamenei
- Preceded by: Esmaeil Kousari
- In office 1997–2000
- President: Mohammad Khatami
- Supreme Leader: Ali Khamenei
- Preceded by: Office Established
- Succeeded by: Mohammad Ali Jafari

Deputy Director of the IRGC Intelligence Organization
- In office 2016–2019
- Preceded by: Office Established
- Succeeded by: Hassan Mohaqeq

Vice Commander-in-chief of IRGC for Cultural and Social affairs
- In office 2019–2020
- Preceded by: Hamidreza Moghadam-far
- Succeeded by: Mohammad Reza Naqdi
- In office 2014–2016
- Preceded by: Mohammad Reza Naqdi
- Succeeded by: ?

Vice Minister of Defence for Parliamentary Affairs
- In office 1989–1990
- Preceded by: Ali Larijani
- Succeeded by: ?

Vice Secretariat of the SNSC for Political and Social affairs
- In office 2010–2013
- Preceded by: ?
- Succeeded by: Reza Seifollahi

Deputy Chief of Joint Staff of the IRGC
- In office 1996–1997
- Preceded by: Hossein Dehghan
- Succeeded by: Mahdi Mohammadi-Fard

Personal details
- Born: Mohammad-Hossein Zibayinejad; 1955 (age 70–71) Shiraz, Iran
- Party: Mojahedin of the Islamic Revolution Organization (1979–1982)
- Nickname: Hossein Nejat

Military service
- Allegiance: Iran
- Branch/service: IRGC
- Years of service: 1981–present
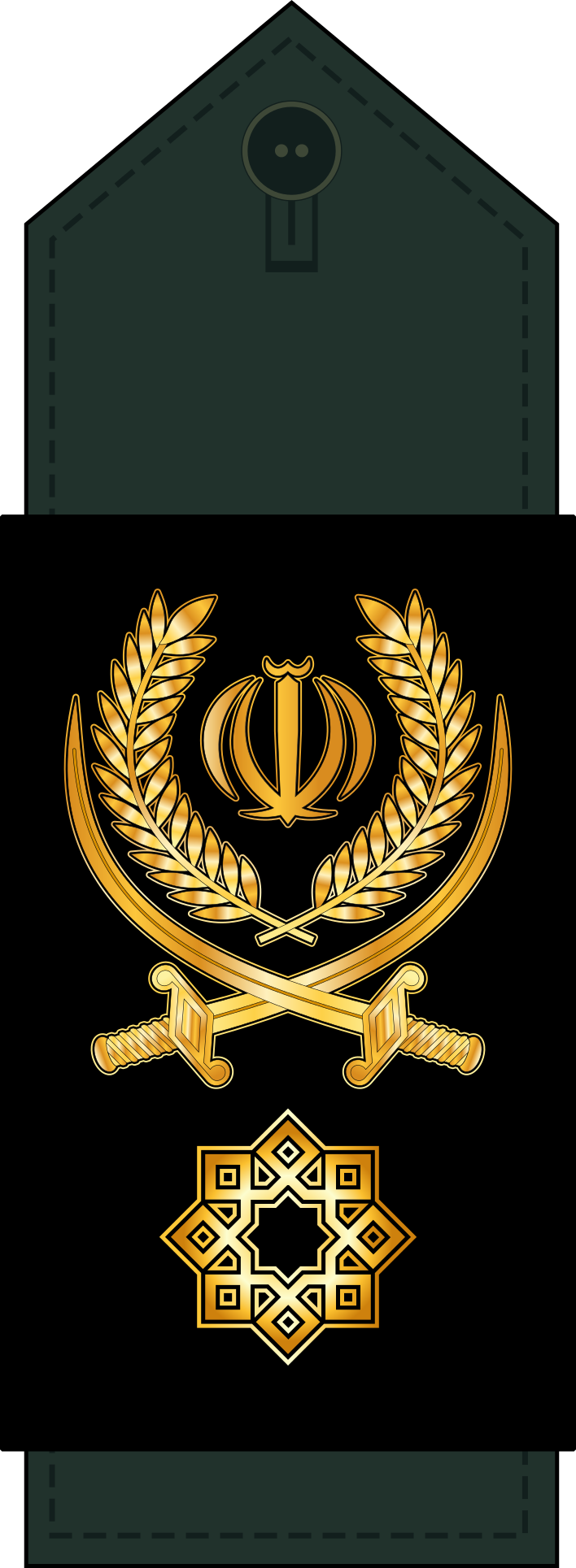
- Rank: Brigadier general
- Commands: Vali Amr Protection Corps (1997–2000)
- Battles/wars: Iran–Iraq War; Syrian civil war; Iranian intervention in Syria; War in Iraq (2013–2017); Iranian intervention in Iraq; 2024 Iran–Israel conflict; Twelve-Day War; 2026 Iran war

Mohammad-Hossein Zibayinejad (Persian: محمدحسین زیبایی‌نژاد), also known as Hossein Nejat (Persian: حسین نجات), is an Iranian Islamic Revolutionary Guard Corps commander who served as deputy head of its Intelligence Organization.

== Career ==
Following the Iranian Revolution, he joined the Mojahedin of the Islamic Revolution Organization, having previously been a member of Mansouroun guerrilla organization along with later fellow IRGC servicemen Rezaei, Shamkhani, Zolghadr and Rashid. In 1981, he was given the responsibility of protecting the officials. In 2000, he became the commander of the Vali Amr corps, which is a protective security unit for the Supreme Leader of Iran, and served in that capacity for ten years; he reportedly had a key role during the 2009 Iranian presidential election protests. He later served as the IRGC deputy for cultural and social affairs, he was later replaced by Mohammad Reza Naqdi in late 2016.

Political offices
Preceded by Ali Larijani	Vice Minister of Defence for Parliamentary Affairs; 1989–1990	Succeeded by ?
Preceded by ?	Vice Secretariat of the SNSC for Political and Social affairs 2010–2013	Succeeded by Reza Seifollahi
Military offices
Preceded by Hossein Dehghan	Deputy Chief of Joint Staff of the IRGC; 1996–1997	Succeeded by Mahdi Mohammadi-Fard
Preceded by Yahya Rahim Safavi	Commander of Thar-Allah Headquarters; 1997–2000	Succeeded by Mohammad Ali Jafari
Preceded by ?	Commander of Vali Amr Protection Corps; 2000–2010	Succeeded by Ebrahim Jabbari
Preceded by Hamidreza Moghadam-far	Vice Commander-in-chief of IRGC for Cultural and Social affairs 2014–2016; 2019 – 2020	Succeeded by Mohammad Reza Naqdi
Preceded by Mohammad Reza Naqdi	Vice Commander-in-chief of IRGC for Cultural and Social affairs 2014–2016; 2019 – 2020	Succeeded by
Preceded by ?	Deputy Chief of Intelligence Organization of the IRGC; 2016–2019	Succeeded by Hassan Mohaghegh
Preceded by Esmaeil Kousari	Deputy Commander of Thar-Allah Headquarters; 2020–present	Incumbent
