= Thar-Allah Headquarters =

- Persian: قرارگاه ثارالله, romanized: Qarārgāh-e Saārollāh
- Active: 1995–present
- Country: Iran
- Branch: Islamic Revolutionary Guard Corps
- Role: Internal security
- Part of: Islamic Revolutionary Guard Corps
- Garrison/HQ: Tehran
- Engagements: Iran student protests, July 1999; 2009 Iranian presidential election protests

Commanders
- Brigadier general: Hossein Nejat
- Deputy Commander: Hossein Nejat
- Supreme Leader's Representative: Ali Shirazi
- Notable commanders: Mohammad Ali Jafari

The Thar-Allah Headquarters (Persian: قرارگاه ثارالله, romanized: Qarārgāh-e Ṣārollāh, also spelled as Tharallah or Tharollah Headquarters) is an Islamic Revolutionary Guard Corps command. It is in charge of security for the Tehran area. However, it also carries responsibility for territorial security in the region. The Thar-Allah Headquarters is directly subordinate to the Commander of the Islamic Revolutionary Guard Corps. Still, its day-to-day operations are supervised by an executive commander. On 1 March 2026, the headquarters was reportedly struck in an Israeli attack.

In addition to its official security duties, the Thar-Allah Headquarters has played a central role in the widespread suppression of popular protests in Iran. Among others, it was directly involved in suppressing the 1999 Iranian student protests, the 2009 Iranian presidential election protests, the 2019–2020 Iranian protests, and also during the widespread protests following the death of Mahsa Amini in 2022 and 2023. The headquarters was directly responsible for the repression of protesters, mass arrests, use of violence, direct shootings at protesters, torture, and severe crackdowns on dissidents. Multiple reports by international human rights?organizations such as Amnesty International, Human Rights Watch, and the United Nations have described these actions as serious violations of human rights and, in some cases, as acts constituting "crimes against humanity". During the June 15, 2009 (25 Khordad) protests, Thar-Allah Headquarters played a key role in suppressing the demonstrations. The Thar-Allah Headquarters is under the command of the Commander-in-Chief of the Islamic Revolutionary Guard Corps, and currently, Brigadier General Hossein Nejat serves as its deputy commander.

Due to its powerful position in the national security establishment—defending the national leadership of Iran and securing the national capital—commanders of the Thar-Allah Headquarters have been criticised for "illegally interfering" in the political process over the years.

== Name ==
"Thar-Allah" roughly translates to "Allah will revenge (Hussein's blood)", which refers to Imam Husayn ibn Ali, who was killed in the Battle of Karbala in 680 AD/61 AH.

== History ==
During the first decade after the establishment of the Islamic Republic of Iran in 1979, no dedicated or specialized riot-control forces were available. In the early 1990s, there were widespread protests that, although economically-driven and not of a political nature in and of themselves, were dealt with a military (combat-level) response by troops drawn from other parts of Iran.

In recognition of this lack of specialized anti-riot forces, the Ashura and al-Zahra battalions (both consisting of Basij veterans) were established in the 1990s, alongside specific NAJA units. The Thar-Allah Headquarters was established in 1995 by the order of Iran's Supreme National Security Council, to be headed by the chief commander of the IRGC.

The Thar-Allah Headquarters was heavily involved in the suppression of the July 1999 Iranian student protests by order of the Supreme National Security Council. In the aftermath of the protests, Thar-Allah gained full independence as a command centre and was responsible for cracking down on street revolts in 2003.

The Thar-Allah Headquarters also played a major role in the suppression of the 2009 Iranian presidential election protests. While combat units from the IRGC's Ground Forces were not mobilized, organizations and forces coordinated by the Thar-Allah Headquarters detained, interrogated, and allegedly tortured many protestors in Thar-Allah's facilities and detainment centers as well as in Evin Prison in Tehran.

== Mission ==
The Thar-Allah Headquarters is tasked with the safety and security of the capital city of Tehran, as well as Tehran and Alborz provinces. In particular, it is tasked with protecting key institutions and the offices of the Government of Iran. The Thar-Allah Headquarters is also tasked with thwarting all threats against Tehran. This mandate is reflected in two directions: security-oriented operations, and societally-oriented operations.

=== Security-oriented operations ===
Security-oriented operations are the core tasks entrusted to the Thar-Allah Headquarters. These missions include dealing with serious unrest as well as providing security for special events, such as presidential inaugurations and other occasions. The Thar-Allah Headquarters has a number of operational units at both the national level (such as the Imam Ali riot battalions and the Imam Hussein infantry battalions, which are both operationally deployable by relevant territorial commands but trained and equipped by the central government) and regional/local units such as the Beit al-Muqaddas battalions, the Ashura battalions, the Al-Zahra battalions, and the Saheb-al-Zaman Special Unit.

The Thar-Allah Headquarters receives intelligence from the Ministry of Intelligence, the Iranian Security Police, and the Intelligence Organization of the Islamic Revolutionary Guard Corps itself.

=== Society-oriented operations ===
The Thar-Allah Headquarters is also responsible for operations and tasks related to the civil society. Some of these tasks consist in monitoring and, if necessary, intervening in sociocultural and social-media activities in Tehran, in what is characterized generally as cultural engineering (part of Thar-Allah's mission is to track down regime opponents in cyberspace and arrest them). In recent years, Thar-Allah cyber units have arrested several dissidents, journalists, and fashion and music influencers.

Society-oriented tasks also include the carrying out of relief and public aid operations. With the outbreak of the COVID-19 pandemic in Iran, the Thar-Allah Headquarters were tasked with supporting the relevant medical efforts in Tehran.

== Procedures ==
Under normal circumstances, security provision in and around Tehran rests with the NAJA and the Iranian Ministry of Intelligence. When the situation escalates, the Supreme National Security Council can request permission of the Supreme Leader of Iran to deploy the Thar-Allah Headquarters' forces. The Ministry of Intelligence, the NAJA, and all government ministries would then come under its operational control. The Thar-Allah Headquarters, in times of crisis, therefore acts effectively as military governor of Tehran.

== Organization ==
Flag of Muhammad Rasul Allah Corps of IRGC in charge of Tehran

As explained above, the Thar-Allah Headquarters acts as military governor authority of Tehran and thus has significant combat power and influence. It consists of two sub-headquarters, Nasser-e and Quds-e, which serve the northwest and south/southeast of Tehran, respectively. There are also several other security units composed of IRGC and Basij personnel.

The leadership of the Thar-Allah consists of its Commander (which always is the Commander-in-Chief of the IRGC), its Deputy Commander (in command of day-to-day operations), the Supreme Leader's Representative, the Deputy Coordinator, and a Deputy Operations Commander (usually a brigadier general). Until March 2020, the latter position was held by Nasser Shabani.

Thar-Allah also has a medical unit, which has been headed by Ali Khalili (a target of EU sanctions) since 2011.

Thar-Allah directly controls three Provincial commands:

- Alborz province: Sepah-e Imam Hassan Mojtaba
- Tehran province: Sepah-e Sayyed al-Shohada
- Tehran city: Sepah-e Muhammad Rasoul Allah

According to the People's Mujahedin of Iran-dominated National Council of Resistance of Iran, Thar-Allah directly controls four subordinate bases in different regions of Tehran:

- Qods: Northwest Tehran
- Nasr: Northeast Tehran
- Qadr: Southeast Tehran
- Fath: Southwest Tehran

=== Operational units ===
The Thar-Allah Headquarters is responsible for coordinating the activities of both operational and territorial units. In this respect, the Thar-Allah Headquarters may be compared to a corps-level command. Its most important operational units are the 10th Operational Division Seyyed ol Shohada of Karaj, Alborz province, and the 27th Operational Division Mohammad Rasoul Allah in Tehran. In addition to these operational divisional units there are three brigade-level units:

- Al Mohammad Security Brigade (Tehran city, Tehran province)
- 1st Hazrat-e Zahra Brigade (Tehran city, Tehran province)
- 20th Ramezan Independent Armored Brigade (Hassanabad, Tehran province)

== Commanders ==
Officially, the Commander of the Islamic Revolutionary Guards Corps also retains the direct command of the Thar-Allah Headquarters. The Headquarters, however, has a deputy commander in charge of day-to-day operations. Since the establishment of the Headquarters, the executive command has been held by six individuals:

No.	Commander		Term	
No.	Portrait	Name	Took office	Left office
1	Hossein Nejat	Brigadier general Hossein Nejat	1997	2000
2	Mohammad Ali Jafari	Brigadier general Mohammad Ali Jafari (born 1957)	2000	2005
3	Nasser Shabani	Brigadier general Nasser Shabani (1957–2020)	2005	13 July 2008
4	Mohammad Hejazi	Brigadier general Mohammad Hejazi (1956–2021)	13 July 2008	2010
5	Mohsen Kazemi [fa]	Brigadier general Mohsen Kazemi	2010	1 July 2017
6	Esmaeil Kousari	Brigadier general Esmaeil Kousari (born 1955)	2 July 2017	21 June 2020
7	Hossein Nejat	Brigadier general Hossein Nejat	21 June 2020	Incumbent

== Iran–Israel war ==
On 23 June 2025 the Israel Defense Forces spokesman announced that the headquarters of Thar-Allah in Tehran was bombed by Israeli fighter planes.

== See also ==
- Islamic Revolutionary Guard Corps Ground Forces
- Political repression
