= Ali Fadavi =

Iranian military officer

Sardar Ali Fadavi
- علی فدوی
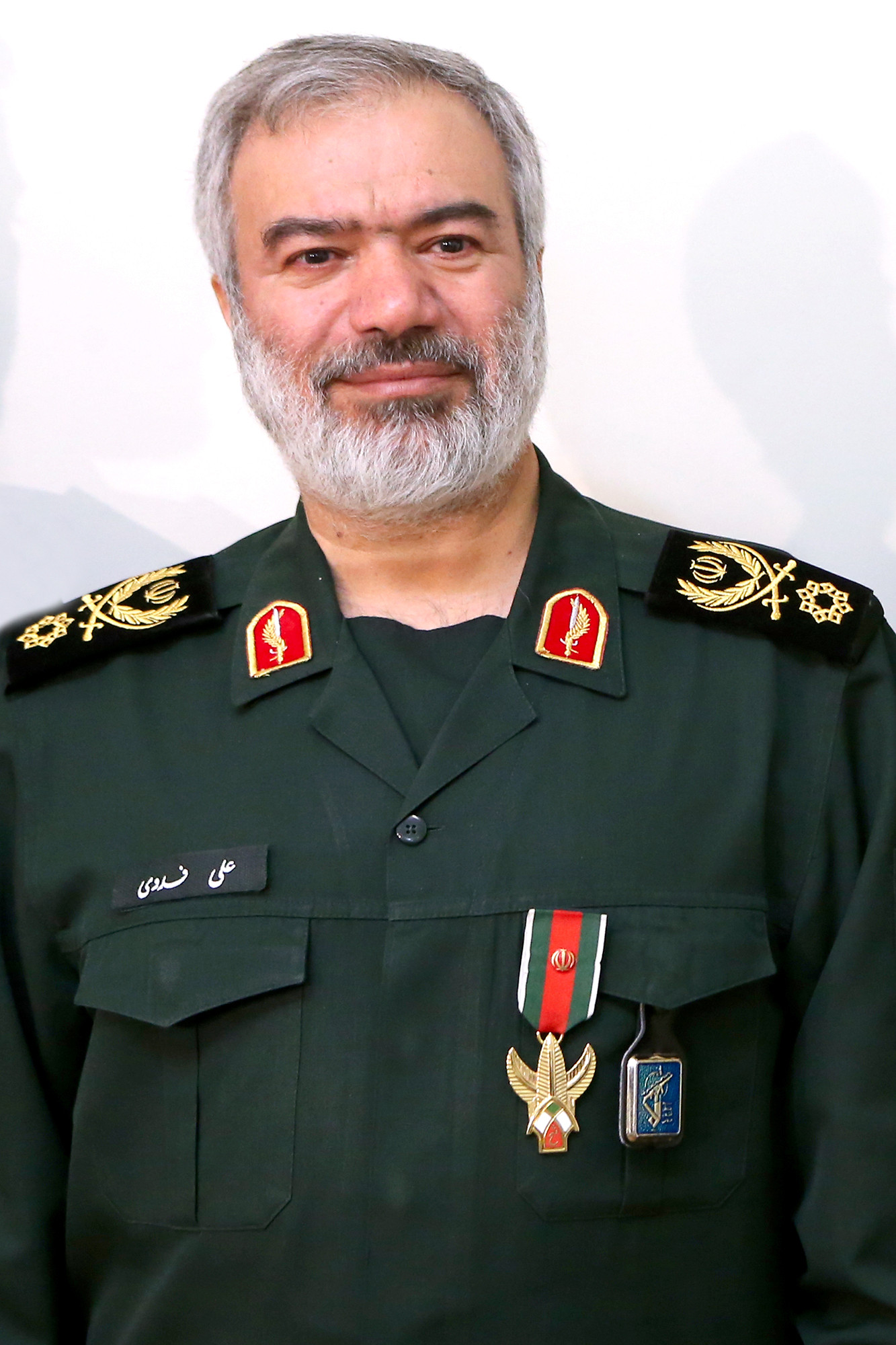
- Fadavi in 2016
- Born: 1961 (age 64–65); Ardestan, Pahlavi Iran
- Children: 5, including Amirhossein Fadavi Firooz
- Military career
- Allegiance: Iran
- Branch: IRGC
- Service years: 1983–present
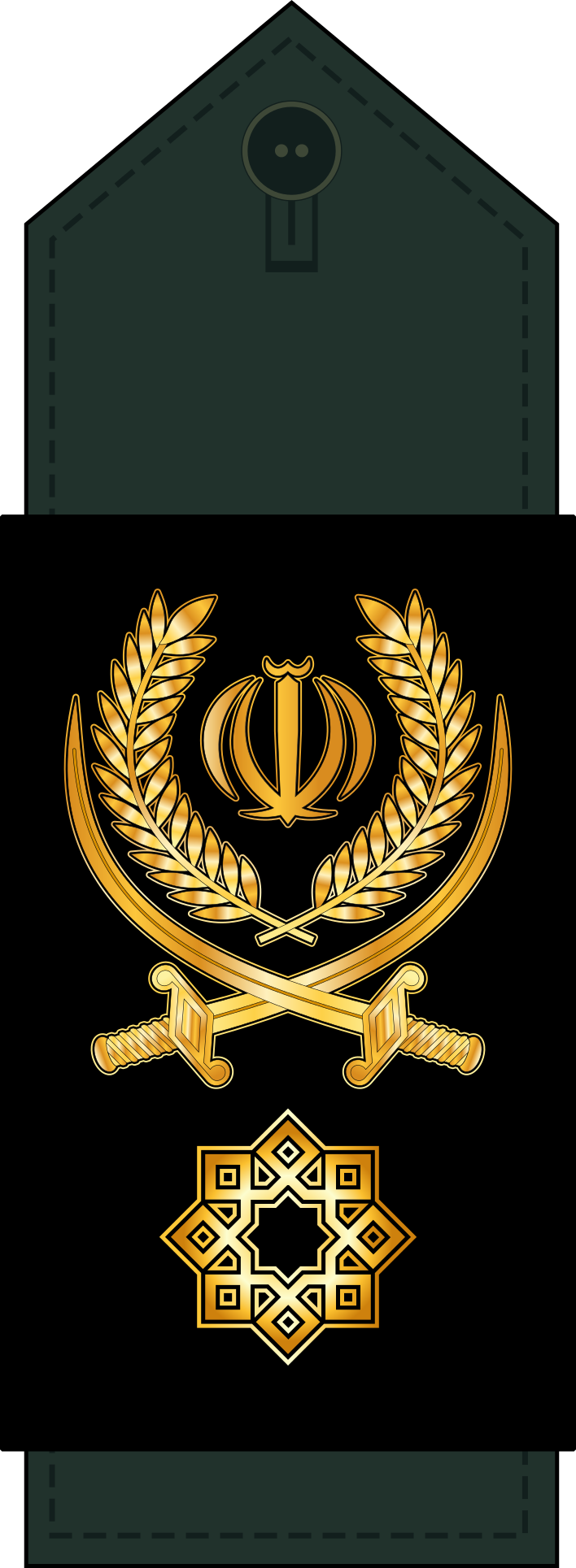
- Rank: Commodore
- Units: Navy (1997–present); Quds Force (before 1997)
- Commands: Head of the Advisory Group to the Commander-in-Chief of the IRGC (2025–Present); Deputy Commander-in-Chief of the IRGC (2019–2025); Coordinating Deputy of the IRGC (2018–2019); IRGC Navy (2010–2018); Deputy Commander of the IRGC Navy (1997–2010); Deputy of Intelligence of IRGC Navy (1985–?)
- Conflicts: Iran–Iraq War; 2004 Iranian seizure of Royal Navy personnel; 2007 Iranian arrest of Royal Navy personnel; 2008 Iran–United States naval dispute; 2015 seizure of Maersk Tigris; 2016 United States–Iran naval incident; 2019–2021 Persian Gulf crisis; 2024 Iran–Israel conflict; Twelve-Day War; 2026 Iran war
- Awards: Order of Fath (1st class)

Ali Fadavi (Persian: علی فدوی) is an Iranian military officer who was deputy commander-in-chief of the Islamic Revolutionary Guard Corps from 2019 to 2025.

== Early life and education ==
He was born in 1961. Fadavi studied at Isfahan University of Technology, where he gained a B.Sc. in electrical engineering and a MS in strategic management.

== Military career ==
Fadavi joined the Islamic Revolutionary Guard Corps (IRGC) in 1983 and is a veteran of the Iran–Iraq War. He served in the Quds Force, and has held "sensitive intelligence" positions. His career includes intelligence assignments as the Chief of Intelligence for the Najaf, Nooh, and Hamzeh Seyyed Ol-Shohada Headquarters respectively, Chief of Intelligence for the IRGCN, and Chief of Intelligence for Khatemolanbia HQ. Fadavi also served as the IRGCN 1st Naval District Commander.

From 1997 to 2010, he was deputy commander of the Navy of the Islamic Revolutionary Guard Corps, and later commanded the branch from May 2010 to 23 August 2018. On 23 August 2018, he was appointed to the position of IRGC coordinator deputy, replacing Jamaladin Aberoumand.

=== Awards ===
In February 2016, Fadavi along with other commanders of the Islamic Revolutionary Guard Corps received Fath medal for arresting United States Navy sailors on January 12, 2016, in the Persian Gulf.

Military offices
Preceded by Jamaleddin Aberoumand	Head of the Advisory Group to the Commander-in-Chief of the IRGC; 27 December 2025–present	Incumbent
Preceded by Hossein Salami	Deputy Commander-in-Chief of the IRGC; 16 May 2019–27 December 2025	Succeeded by Ahmad Vahidi
Preceded by Jamaleddin Aberoumand	Coordinating Deputy of the IRGC; 23 August 2018–1 May 2019	Succeeded by Mohammad Reza Naqdi
Preceded by Morteza Saffari	Commander of the IRGC Navy; 3 May 2010–23 August 2018	Succeeded by Alireza Tangsiri
Preceded by Unknown	Deputy Commander of the IRGC Navy; 1997–3 May 2010	Succeeded by Unknown
Preceded by Unknown	Deputy of Intelligence of the IRGC Navy; 1995–?	Succeeded by Unknown
