= Gholamhossein Gheybparvar =

Iranian military officer (1962–2025)

Sardar Gholamhossein Gheybparvar غلامحسین غیب‌پرور
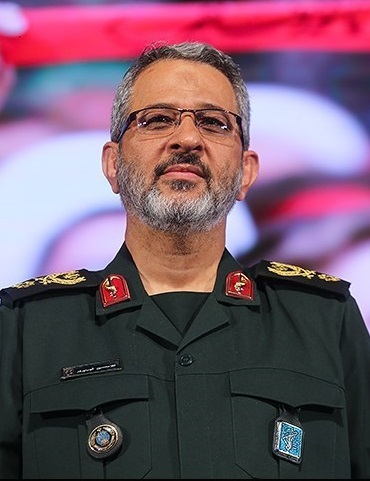
- Gheybparvar in 2018
- Born: 1962; Shiraz, Iran
- Died: 15 July 2025 (aged 63)
- Military career
- Allegiance: Revolutionary Guard
- Service years: 1982–2025
- Rank: Brigadier General
- Commands: 25th Karbala Division (2002–2006); 19th Fajr Division (1980s; 2006–2007); Fajr Corps of Fars Province (2007–2016); Imam Hossein Headquarters of Aleppo (2015–2016); Basij (2016–2019)
- Conflicts: Iran–Iraq War; Syrian Civil War

Gholamhossein Gheybparvar (Persian: غلامحسین غیب‌پرور; 1962 – 15 July 2025) was an Iranian senior officer in the Islamic Revolutionary Guard Corps who formerly commanded Basij forces. He was affiliated with the IRGC since 1979, following the Islamic Revolution.

== Military career ==
Gheybparvar played an active role in the Iran–Iraq War (1980–1988), serving in various positions within the Islamic Revolutionary Guard Corps (IRGC). Over the years, he held several key command roles, including Commander of the 19th Fajr Division in Shiraz, Commander of the 25th Karbala Division in Mazandaran province from 2001 to 2006, and Commander of the Fajr Corps in Fars Province between 2007 and 2016. Additionally, in 2000, he was appointed Head of Training for the IRGC Ground Forces. During the Syrian civil war, Gheybparvar was deployed to Syria in October 2015, where he was tasked with overseeing IRGC brigades supporting the Syrian government.

== Leadership roles ==
Gheybparvar held key leadership positions within Iran's internal security apparatus. From December 2016 to July 2019, he served as the commander of the Basij Resistance Force, a paramilitary wing of the IRGC tasked with maintaining internal security and suppressing dissent. Following this, in September 2019, he was appointed the commander of the Imam Ali Central Security Headquarters, a unit established in 2011 specifically to confront public protests and riots. This headquarters plays a significant role in managing and suppressing domestic unrest in Iran.

== Controversies and sanctions ==
Gheybparvar was implicated in serious human rights violations related to his involvement in the suppression of nationwide protests in Iran. During the December 2017 to January 2018 protests, Basij forces under his command were responsible for a violent crackdown that resulted in numerous deaths and mass detentions. Later, as commander of the Imam Ali Central Security Headquarters, he played a leading role in the brutal suppression of the November 2019 protests, an operation that led to significant civilian casualties across the country.

== Death ==
Gheybparvar died on 15 July 2025, at the age of 63.

Military offices
Preceded by Mohammad Reza Naqdi	Head of Basij Organization; 2016–2019	Succeeded by Gholamreza Soleimani
