= Islamic Revolutionary Guard Corps Joint Staff =

Dissolved office of Iran's Islamic Revolutionary Guard Corps

Joint Staff of the Islamic Revolutionary Guard Corps
- ستاد مشترک سپاه پاسداران انقلاب اسلامی
- Seal of the Islamic Revolutionary Guard Corps
- Founded: 1984
- Disbanded: 2008
- Headquarters: Tehran, Iran

Joint Staff of the Islamic Revolutionary Guard Corps (Persian: ستاد مشترک سپاه پاسداران انقلاب اسلامی), formerly called General Staff (ستاد کل), was the chief of staff of the Islamic Revolutionary Guard Corps with an aim to coordinate its military branches; and responsible for organization, support, and supervision of all executive affairs within the military. The office was originally created in late 1984 General Provost of IRGC was a subdivision to the Joint Staff.

== List of Chiefs ==
No.	Portrait	رئیس	Took office	Left office	Time in office	Ref.
IRGC Central Staff
1	Reza Seifollahi [fa]	Reza Seifollahi (born 1957/1958)	1983	1984	0–1 years	–
2	Yousef Foroutan [fa]	Yousef Foroutan (born 1944)	1984	1984	0 years	–
3	Alireza Afshar	Alireza Afshar (c. 1951–2025)	November 1984	June 1986	1–2 years	–
IRGC General Staff
1	Alireza Afshar	Alireza Afshar (c. 1951–2025)	June 1986	October 1987	0–1 years	–
2	Mohammad Forouzandeh	Mohammad Forouzandeh (born 1960)	October 1987	22 September 1989	1–2 years	–
3	Mohammad Bagher Zolghadr	Mohammad Bagher Zolghadr (born c. 1954/1955)	22 September 1989	15 January 1992	2–3 years	–
IRGC Joint Staff
3	Mohammad Bagher Zolghadr	Brigadier General; Mohammad Bagher Zolghadr (born c. 1954/1955)	15 January 1992	13 September 1997	4–5	–
4	Hossein Alaei	Brigadier General; Hossein Alaei	29 September 1997	20 July 2000	2–3 years	–
5	Ali Akbar Ahmadian	Brigadier General; Ali Akbar Ahmadian (born 1961)	20 July 2000	20 September 2007	6–7 years	–
6	Mohammad Hejazi	Brigadier General; Mohammad Hejazi (1956–2021)	20 September 2007	26 February 2008	0–1 years	–

=== List of Deputy Chiefs ===
- Abbas Mohtaj (1988–1989)
- Ali Larijani (1989–1992)
- Hossein Dehghan (18 January 1992–30 December 1996)
- Hossein Nejat (30 December 1996–1997)
- Mehdi Mohammadifard (?–?)
- Ali Shamshiri (?–30 October 2005)
- Hossein Salami (20 November 2005 –21 January 2006)
- Hossein Zarif-Manesh (?–25 February 2008)

== List of Deputy Coordinators ==
No.	Portrait	رئیس	Took office	Left office	Time in office	Ref.
IRGC Deputy Coordinators
1	Mohammad Hejazi	Mohammad Hejazi (1956–2021)	26 February 2008	22 May 2008	86 days	–
2	Jamaladdin Aberoumand [fa]	Jamaladdin Aberoumand (born 1962)	22 May 2008	18 July 2018	10 years, 57 days	–
–	Hossein SalamiActing	Hossein Salami; Acting (1960–2025)	18 July 2018	23 August 2018	36 days	–
3	Ali Fadavi	Ali Fadavi (born 1961)	23 August 2018	16 May 2019	266 days	–
4	Mohammad Reza Naqdi	Mohammad Reza Naqdi (born 1961)	16 May 2019	26 October 2025	6 years, 163 days	–
5	Seyyed Hojatollah Qureishi [fa]	Seyyed Hojatollah Qureishi (born 1966)	26 October 2025		326 days	–

== See also ==
- General Staff of the Armed Forces of the Islamic Republic of Iran
- List of commanders of the Islamic Revolutionary Guard Corps
- List of Chiefs of Staff of the Iranian Armed Forces
- Joint Staff of the Islamic Republic of Iran Army
