= IRGC University of Command and Staff =

Iranian military educational institution

- دانشگاه فرماندهی و ستاد سپاه پاسداران انقلاب اسلامی
- University Seal
- Type: Military academy
- Established: 1992
- Affiliations: Islamic Revolutionary Guard Corps
- Commandant: Vacant
- Location: Tehran, Iran
- Campus: Urban
- Nickname: DAFOS IRGC

IRGC University of Command and Staff (Persian: دانشگاه فرماندهی و ستاد سپاه پاسداران انقلاب اسلامی) is the staff college of the Islamic Revolutionary Guard Corps (IRGC), located in Tehran, Iran. Based on IRGC's military doctrine, the academy focuses on irregular military science on both operational and tactical levels and presents IRGC's Supreme War Course.

== Directors ==
- Hossein Salami (1992–1997)
- Amir Hayat Moghadam (1997–2000)
- Ahmad Sayafzadeh (2000–2004)
- Abbas Nilforoushan (2010–2014)
- Bahram Hosseini Motlagh (2014–2026)
