= Sardar (Islamic Revolutionary Guard Corps) =

Honorific title ranking 2nd Brigadier General and higher

Gorget patches for Sardars (used on collars)

Sardar (Persian: سردار), roughly equivalent to "General", is the honorific title used for officers of high rank, ranking Second Brigadier General and higher in the Islamic Revolutionary Guard Corps and commanders of the Police Command of the Islamic Republic of Iran who have previously served in the former military or the Islamic Revolutionary Committees, as well as the commanders of the disbanded Jihad of Construction. Sardars are often graduates of the University of Command and Staff.

The title is equivalent to "Amir" or "Timsar" in the Islamic Republic of Iran Army.

Ranks being addressed by the title include:

Rank
Insignia
Sartip 2
Pasdar

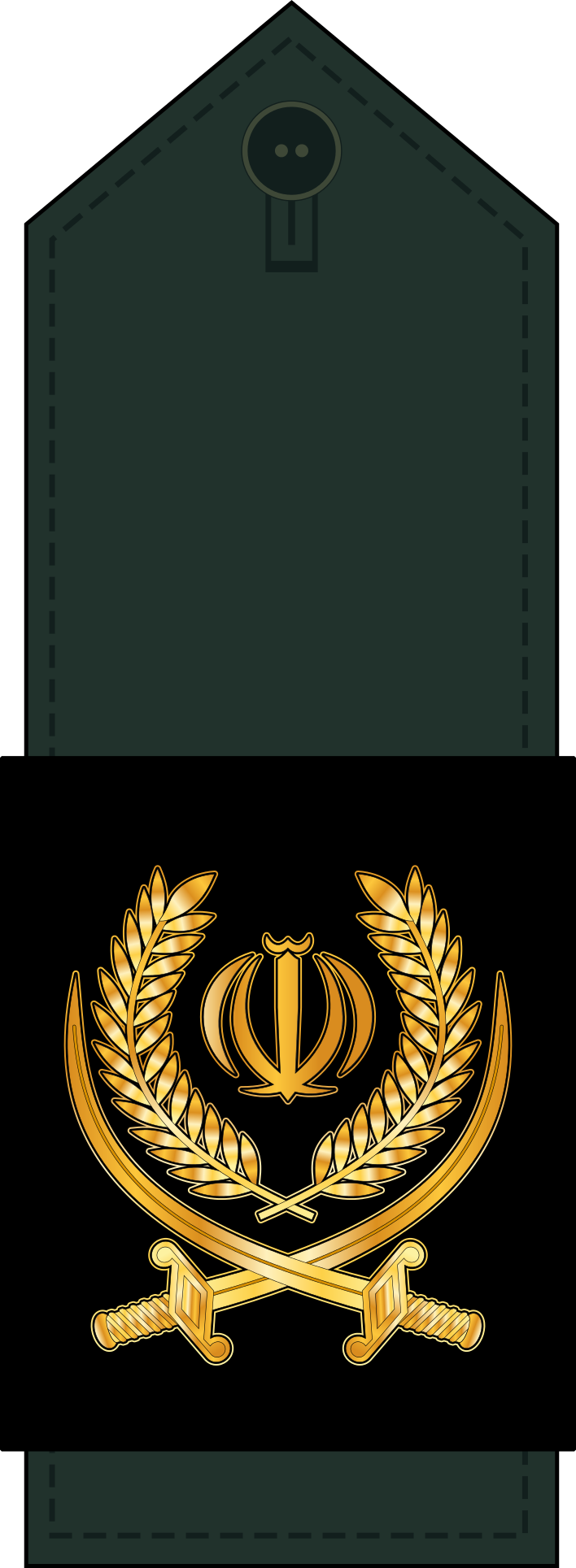

Sartip
Pasdar

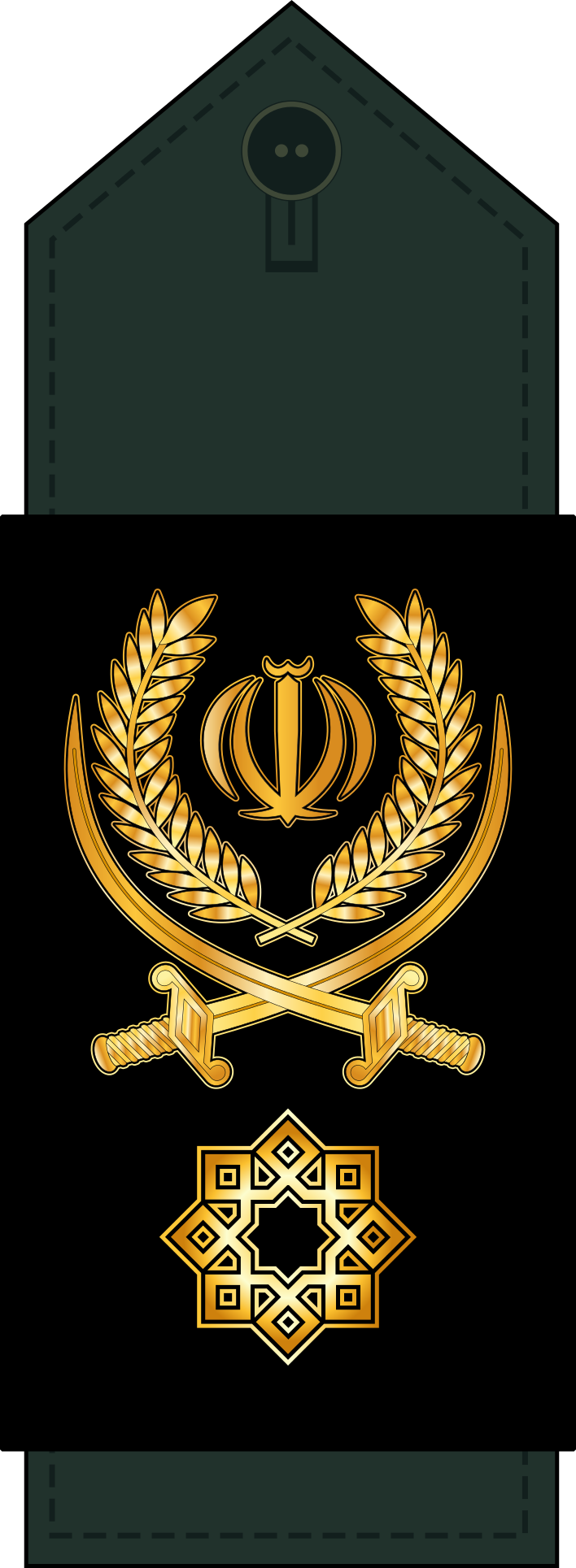

Sarlashkar
Pasdar

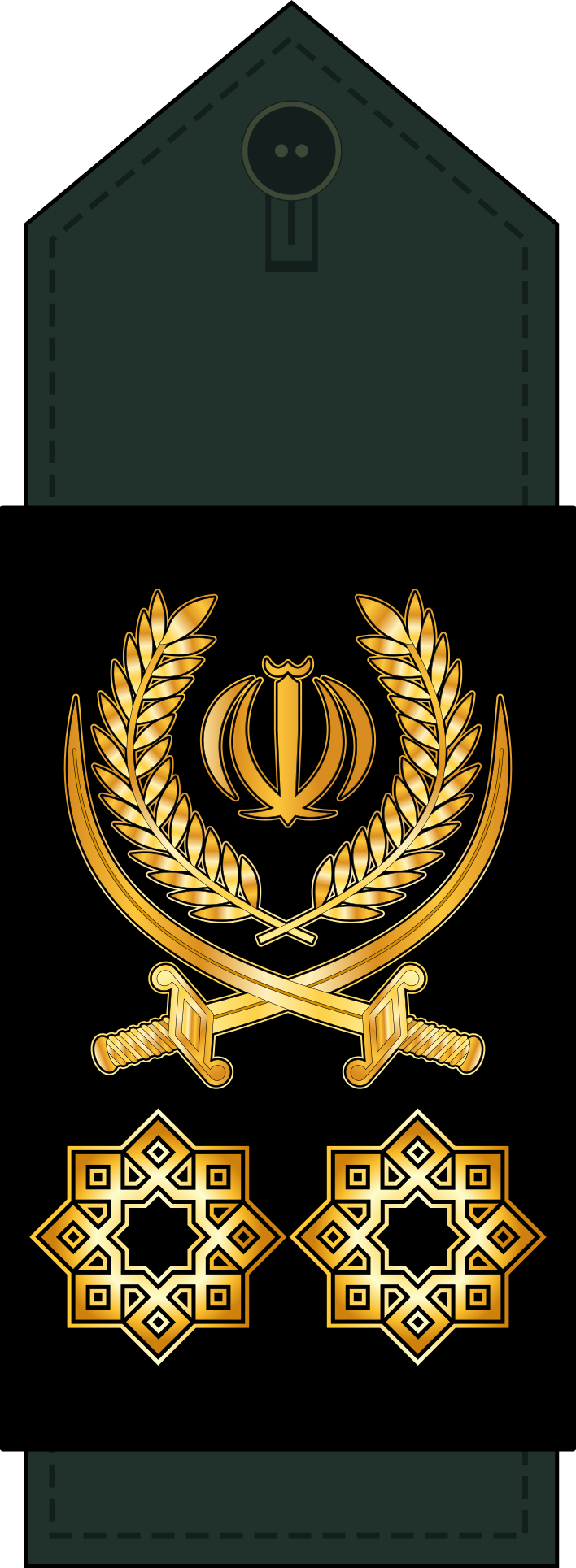

Sepahbod
Pasdar

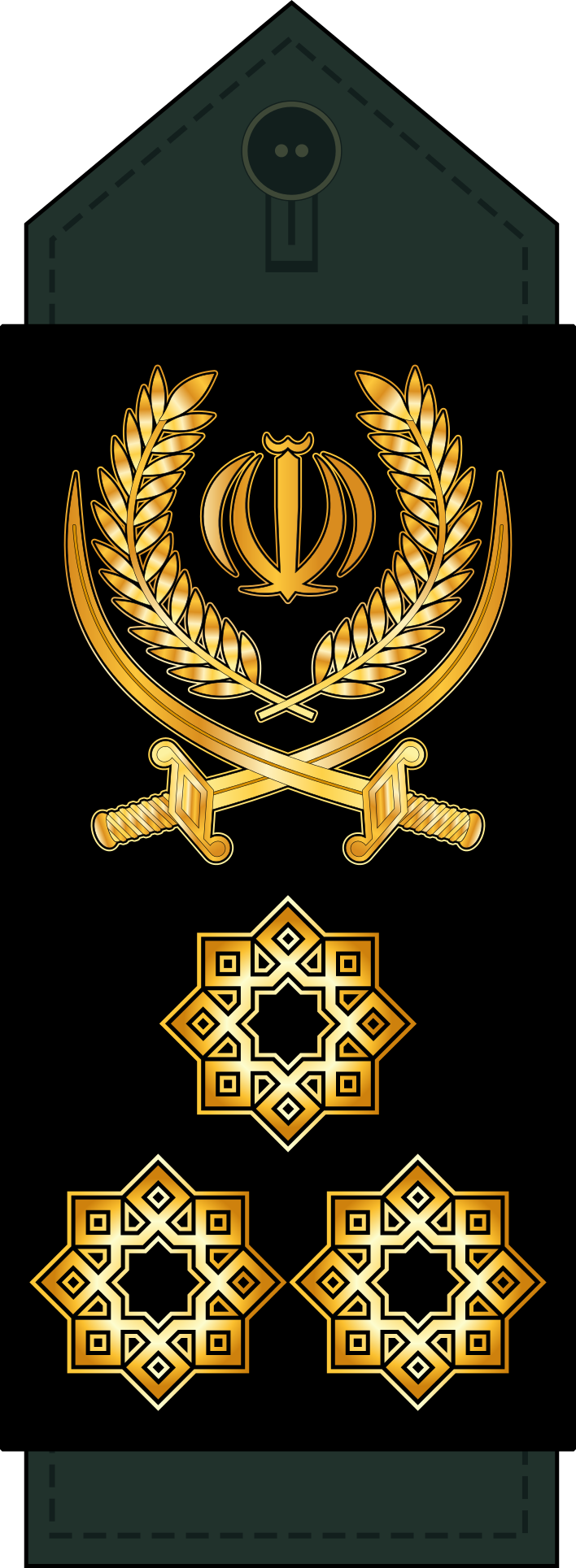

Arteshbod
Pasdar

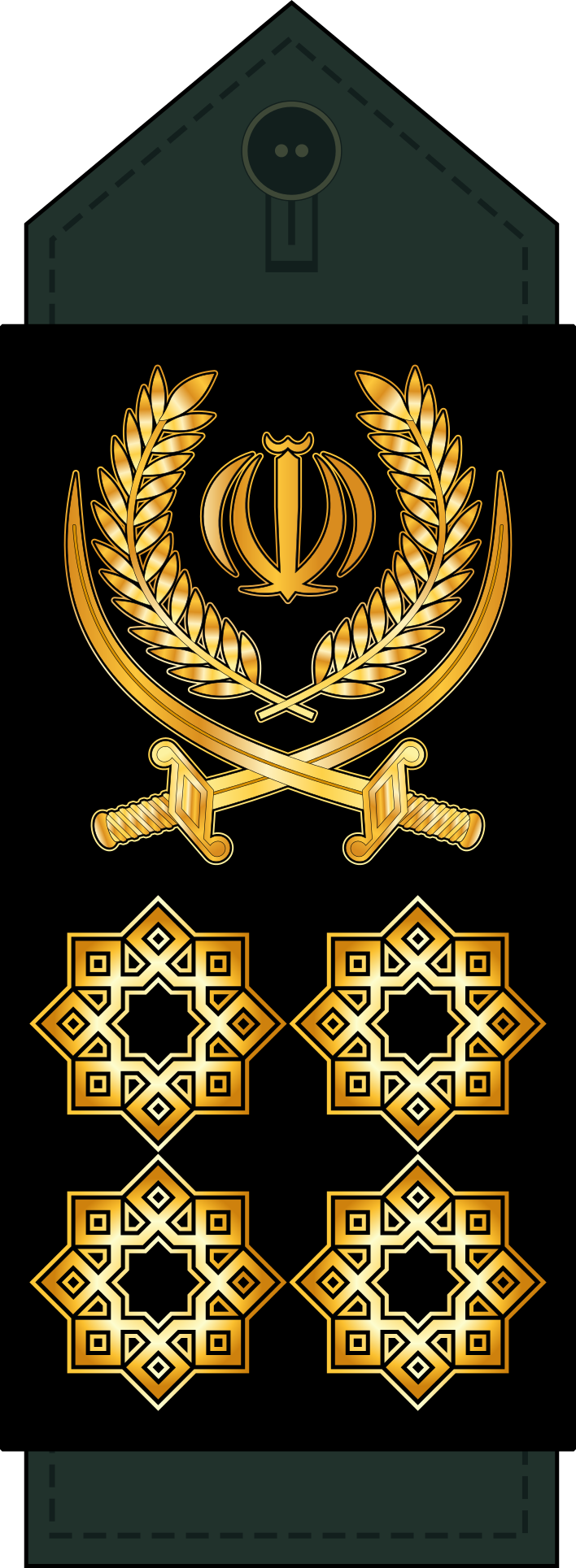

== See also ==
- Military ranks of Iran
