= Imam Hossein University =

Iranian university

- دانشگاه امام حسین; Dāneshgāh-e Emām Hossein
- Coat of arms
- Motto: تأمین نیروی انسانی متخصص
- Motto in English: Producing skilled manpower
- Type: Public; Military academy
- Established: 1986; 40 years ago
- Affiliations: IRGC; MSRT; MODAFL
- Endowment: US$ 20.0 million (21 March 2013)
- Chancellor: Mohammad-Reza Hassani Ahangar
- Faculty: 300
- Students: 6,000
- Undergraduates: 4,000
- Postgraduates: 2,000
- Doctoral students: 500
- Location: (Iran) Tehran, Iran; 35°45′02″N 51°35′15″E
- Campus: Urban
- Colours: Green
- Nickname: IHU
- Website: www.ihu.ac.ir

The Imam Hossein University (IHU) (Persian: دانشگاه امام حسین, Dāneshgāh-e Emām Hosein) is a public university located in Tehran, Iran. It was established by Islamic Revolutionary Guard Corps (IRGC) Commander Seyed Mehdi Mousavi Zare.

The university was opened in 1986, and is located in Babayi Expressway near Tehranpars and Hakimiyeh in northeastern Tehran. The university is affiliated with the Islamic Revolutionary Guard Corps (IRGC), Ministry of Science, Research and Technology, and Ministry of Defense and Armed Forces Logistics. Its official title is Imam Hossein Comprehensive University. It is named after Husayn ibn Ali, a grandson of the Islamic prophet Muhammad, who was killed in the Battle of Karbala in 680.

IHU provides undergraduate and postgraduate programs in 15 departments. The student body consists of 6,000 students and cadets.

The procedure for accepting and processing requests at IHU is different from other universities. Regular students can get admission by passing Iranian University Entrance Exam which is done yearly by Ministry of Science, Research and Technology. Those students are without scholarship and will not be employed by the IRGC. They should also pay tuition fees.

However, students with scholarship are accepted by the IRGC after passing ideological interviews and medical tests, and being a member of the Basij will be an advantage for getting a scholarship. Those students are not permitted to go abroad or to work for private companies. For many years, IRGC Cadet College and IHU academic division were in the same place. But Imam Hossein Cadet College was separated from the academic division in 2005. Then, the academic division was relocated to another recently built infrastructure, and was renamed as the "Imam Hossein Comprehensive University".

== History ==
The university was established in 1986 by Islamic Revolutionary Guard Corps (IRGC) Commander Seyed Mehdi Mousavi Zare, named Imam Hossein Higher Education and approved as a university by Iran’s Ministry of Science, Research and Technology. It included faculty of engineering science, faculty of natural science, faculty of social science, and faculty of medicine in 1987. Later, it also included faculty of military science.

In 1994, the faculty of medicine seceded to become the Baqiyatallah Medical Sciences University, which is the primary medical institution, and currently trains students up to PhD levels in three faculties, namely: Nursing, Allied Health, and Medicine, as well as the Institute of Research for Military Medicine.

=== Background ===
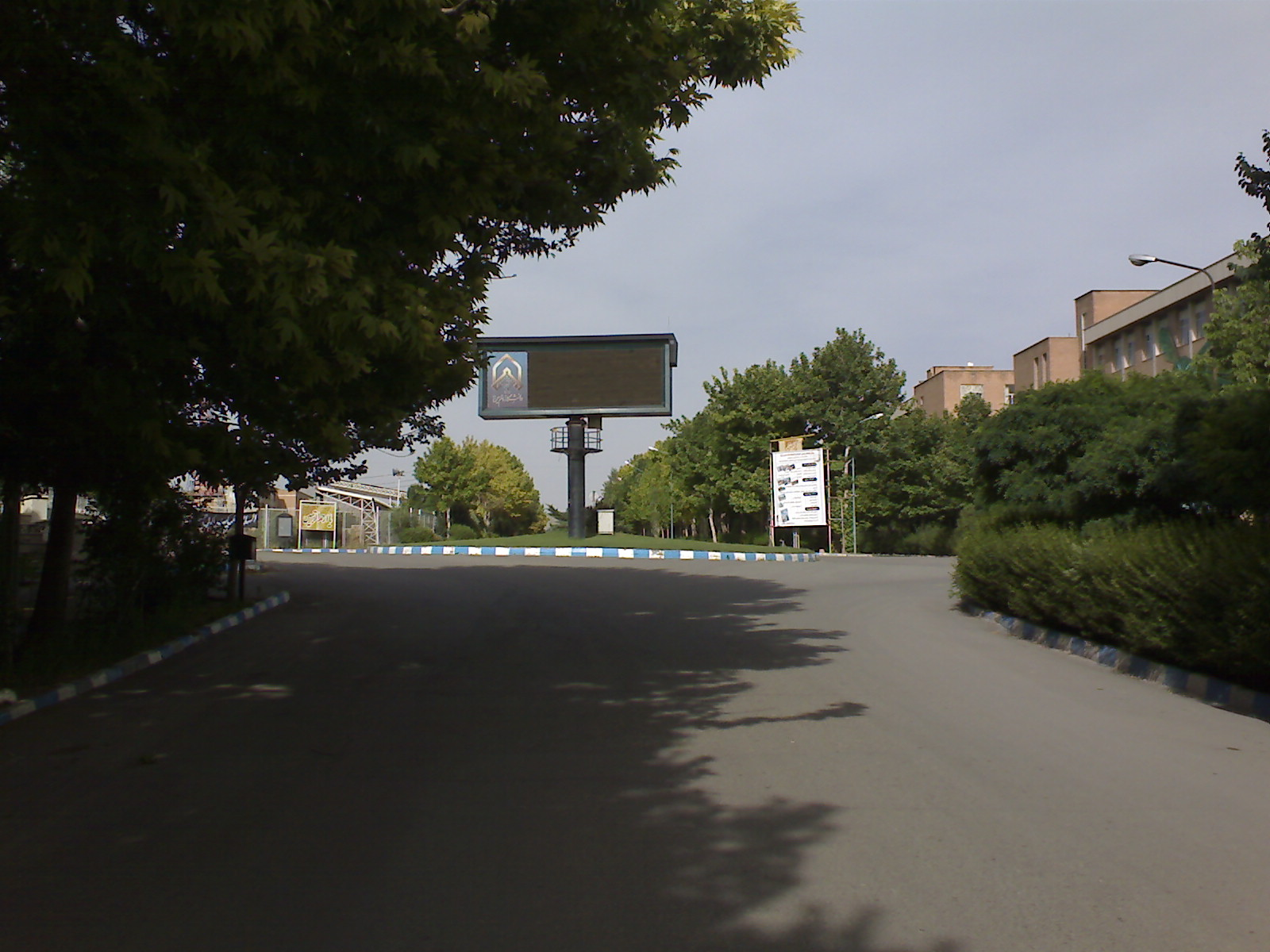
Imam Hossein University Main Entrance Gate

In 1963, Iran placed all military factories under the Military Industries Organization (MIO) of the Ministry of War. Over the next fifteen years, they produced small arms ammunition, explosives, and mortar rounds and fuses. They furthermore produced rifles and machine guns under West German license. Additionally, they assembled helicopters, jeeps, trucks, and trailers from imported kits. However, the Iran Revolution stopped all activities. The MIO was unable to operate without foreign experts, so it lost much of its management ability and control over its industrial facilities by 1981.

In late 1981, the revolutionary government brought together all military industrial units and placed them under the Defense Industries Organization (DIO). By 1986, a large number of infantry rifles, machine guns, and mortars and some small-arms ammunition were being manufactured locally. However, they required some specialists and technicians. For this purpose, they opened several universities and colleges, e.g. Imam Hossein University, Baqiyatallah Medical Sciences University, and Malek-Ashtar University of Technology, directly or indirectly linked to DIO by mid-1980s.

Prior to 1989, they began working on the ballistic missiles program was responsibility of the missile unit in IRGC. In 1989, the Ministry of Defense and the Guards merged to form the Ministry of the Armed Forces Logistics, and the IRGC's facilities were merged into the Defense Industry Organization. By the mid-1990s, they were reportedly responsible for Iran's missile programs, headed by the Aerospace Industries Organization (AIO).

On 18 June 2025, during the Twelve-Day War, Israeli airstrikes targeted Imam Hussein University. The strike reportedly resulted in at least 15 fatalities, including IRGC personnel, and caused significant structural damage to parts of the campus. The university was among several high-profile Iranian sites hit during a wave of Israeli attacks on military and strategic installations.

== Research ==
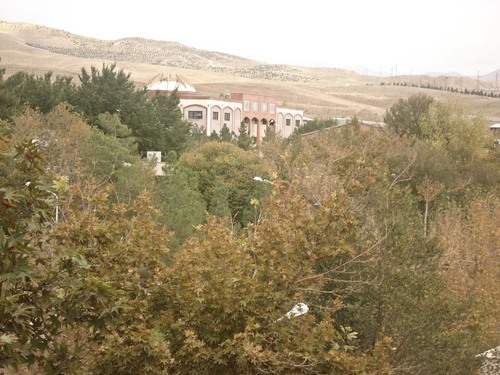
View of the main campus

It has a scientific group and a nuclear physics department. Imam Hossein University, which is particularly run on military lines by IRGC, is the center for experiments on nuclear research. Iranian scientists are conducting nuclear research and development using university laboratories.

However, it is not only a main center for nuclear research. It also has a place for biological research. Imam Hossein University has a biological section that conducts microbial research. Nonetheless, nuclear enrichment at Imam Hossein University is the mother of all research at what called a nuclear weapons university. Prof. Raymond Tanter, of Georgetown University, an expert on Iran, claimed that this university has become the center for all of Iran's secret nuclear programs. In February 1998, Imam Hossein University was identified by the British government as having procured goods and/or technology for weapons of mass destruction programs, in addition to doing non-proliferation related business.

It was named by the German government as an Iranian military procurement organization working toward acquiring weapons of mass destruction; reportedly conducts nuclear development activities separate from the Atomic Energy Organization of Iran, according to US officials produces anthrax and aflatoxin. It was added to the Specially Designated Nationals (SDN) list maintained by the U.S. Department of the Treasury's Office of Foreign Assets Control (OFAC) on 8 November 2012, freezing its assets under U.S. jurisdiction and prohibiting transactions with U.S. parties, which targets proliferators of weapons of mass destruction and their delivery systems, and also listed by the Government of Japan in 2012 as an entity of concern for proliferation relating to missiles and biological, chemical, and nuclear weapons.

During the 1990s, the Iran centralized several centers for nuclear research programme under a single unit. They transferred all of their nuclear facilities around the country to the Defense Ministry and also to Imam Hossein University. The announcement on the university's now defunct website shed light on one of Iran's developing nuclear programme and the laser enrichment technique. Prof. Raymond Tanter said that it particularly is importance to mention laser enrichment as a mean to create nuclear fuel. One of the most critical projects is conducted at Imam Hossein University on use of lasers for enrichment. In addition to laser enrichment, the university carried out a test on neutron generator that can also trigger the fission chain reaction.

In January 2006, the university had the third nationwide congress on the modern defensive wars in the field of chemical, biological, nuclear wars as announced on the university's website, which is no longer online. According to the announcement, the congress discussed the new types of bombs, such as: electromagnetic, air fuelled, graphite, laser and enfeebling bombs. Prof. Raymond Tanter argued the conference was a part of the accelerating research and development on nuclear programme.

=== Physics Research Center ===
According to the El Baradei's report of the International Atomic Energy Agency (IAEA), the university called a technical university in the report houses the Physics Research Center (PHRC), which controls the Iranian nuclear program, once under the Atomic Energy Organization of Iran (AEOI), Iran's civilian nuclear agency. One of the principal sources of nuclear experts has been Imam Hossein University. Part of the takeover of the Iranian nuclear program also necessarily included transferring experts from around the country into this university. The IAEA stated the IRGC is believed to have co-opted the nuclear research facilities and experts of the university system in order to conceal and cloak the true military aspect of the Iranian nuclear program. For example, an Iranian company, Kimia Maadan (KM) Company, made use of experts from this university. The IAEA had also questions regarding the role and origin of KM Company. The company was founded by nuclear experts, a core staff about half a dozen experts who had previously worked for the Iranian Ore Processing Center (OPC). There are relationships among various university research teams, PHRC of Imam Hossein University, the Education Research Institute (ERI) and the Institute of Applied Physics (IAP) and KM Company, each working on different aspects of the Iranian nuclear program.

One of the research projects addressed in the IAEA report is the Iranian Green Salt Project, apparently managed by KM Company. The project performed a flowsheet of bench scale conversion of uranium oxide (UO_{2}) into 1 ton of UF_{4} per year, also known as Green Salt. It is an early step in an enrichment process, beyond the capacity or scope of the Uranium Ore Concentration (UOC) plant. According to the IAEA report, KM Company designed and built a turnkey (flowsheet). The document also referred to the project concerning the missile re-entry vehicle.

The IAEA has also reported the Iranian testing of multiple high-explosive detonators designs and documents the layout for an underground nuclear blast test facility in this university. In 2006, a senior US official revealed the Washington Post a diagram being schematically consistent with a nuclear test-site schematic in Iran. Later in 2006, a contingent of senior officers from Iran travelled to North Korea to see an underground facility to test explosion. IAEA also asked questions about the Iranian Shahab-3 missile designs. Specifically, re-entry vehicle designs are believed to be engineered for the ability to carry nuclear warheads.

The various scientific research groups of Iran's nuclear program, run from this university under the direction of the IRGC, are including efforts to obtain training courses and software on spark gaps, shock wave software, neutron sources, special steel parts, radiation measurement equipment, including borehole spectrometers. Nonetheless, Iran answered that it sought PAM shock software to study aircraft, collision of cars, airbags and for the design of seatbelts.

=== Biological Research Center ===
The Center for Strategic and International Studies (CSIS) made a report about the biological activities in Iran, which are centered on the productions of microbial bombs using anthrax, smallpox virus, typhoid fever, high dosage of aflatoxin, plague microbes, and chloromicrobes, done at Imam Hossein University in Tehran. Genetic cloning is also being carried out at Malek-Ashtar University of Technology. These claims were provided by the National Council of Resistance of Iran in a press conference at the Willard Hotel in Washington on 15 May 2003. The activities about biological weapons began in 1985, during the Iran–Iraq War. In 1985 and 1986, they established a research center in the Pasteur Institute of Iran in Tehran to work on toxic fungus and microbial substances. The center succeeded in producing toxic fungus, including aflatoxin. In the next years, as they succeeded in mass production of microbial material, they moved the production centers to Imam Hossein University. Centers such as Pasteur Institute are now being used for research purposes.

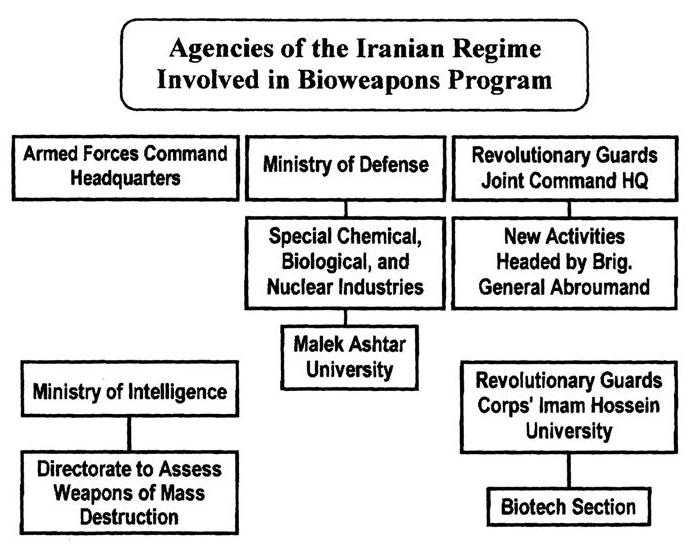
Iran's Biological Programme

A number of foreign microbial experts from China, North Korea, India, and Russia are cooperating with the Ministry of Defense of Iran. A number of them have been hired by this organization. The Biological Research Center of Special Industries Organization is located at Shahid Meisami and Martyr Meisami complex. Also, students are given scholarships to study and use technology. The Baqiyatallah Medical Sciences University, affiliated with the Baqiyatallah Hospital, is another center which works on microbial works. The Research Center for Direct Biotechnology does not directly work on microbial bombs, but it is used as the research supplement for biological weapons and actively works with Malek-Ashtar University of Technology and Imam Hossein University, as well as the Baqiyatallah Medical Sciences University. Notwithstanding, the Centers for Science and Technological Growth of the Biological Research Center of Malek Ashtar, affiliated with the defense industries, are in charge of mass production of biological weapons.

In addition, the Sina Industry (previously named Vira Laboratories) are concentrated on production of the biological materials. It is a center that has been active since 1990. It is one of the most important biological and chemical laboratories of Iran. It seems that basically used as a front, as a cover for doing their research and their activities on biological weapons under the cover and the name of medical research.

=== Chemical Research Center ===
Imam Hossein University is involved in chemical technology, offering scholarships in this subject. Since 1999, they have pursued the chemical research in a much larger scale. One of the projects was to build a fermentor. The 24th Bessat group linked to this university produces a significant amount of nerve gas in liquid, vapor, and powder form. Cyanide, tri-glycol, and sodium cyanide are produced for chemical purposes as well.

Another organization run by the Defense Ministry is one of the agencies involved in producing chemical products. They have more than 4,000 employees, a chemical laboratory named Vira Laboratories, and a chemical material storage known as Shahid Meisami. The Parchin Chemical Industries, located in south of Tehran, is another center of chemical products. It includes storage and glass body equipment to produce lethal nerve gas. Much of the equipment has been received from Hungarian manufacturer Lampert. Another complex manufacturer near the city of Semnan is also engaged in producing nerve gas.

The center for chemical research and chemical engineering located in west of Tehran is also used for a joint research and technological study of Imam Hossein University and Malek-Ashtar University of Technology. The Chinese experts are supervising some research projects.

=== Aerospace Research Center ===
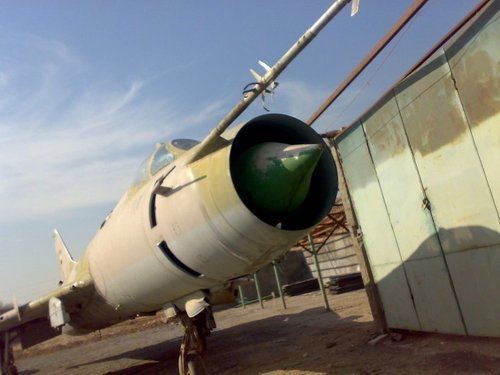
Department of Aerospace Engineering (دانشکده هوا و فضا)

Imam Hossein University offers Aerospace Engineering degree programs at undergraduate and postgraduate levels. It is among some universities in Iran, where provide the Aerospace Engineering degrees. These universities includes K. N. Toosi University of Technology, Sharif University of Technology, Amirkabir University of Technology, Imam Hossein University, and Malek-Ashtar University of Technology. The Sharif University of Technology is the first university, where offers bachelor's degree and master's degree in the field of Aerospace Engineering and Aeronautical Engineering since 1987. The K.N. Toosi University of Technology has also PhD in Aerospace Engineering (Joint program with Moscow State Aviation Technological University in Russia). The Malek-Ashtar University of Technology is also involved in Aerospace research and programs related to Aerospace engineering.

Iran established the Iranian Space Agency in an uninhabited desert area in Semnan Province, south-east of Tehran in April 2003. The center has a remote satellite command-and-control facility and a satellite launch pad. The Remote Space Sensing Center affiliated to the Ministry of Post and Telegraph and Technology launched three decades ago. The Aerospace Research Institute affiliated to the Ministry of Science, Research and Technology is another active organization in the space science and technology applications. The Meteorological Organization performs atmosphere analysis in support of agriculture, transportation, water, energy, and environment. Five public Universities, one private university (Azad University Science and Research Branch), and one college (Civil Aviation Technology College) provide higher education and research in aerospace engineering.

Iran started its scientific aerospace cooperation with China following the establishment of its Aerospace Organization in 2000. China has successfully launched forty satellites since 1996. In May 2005, Iran signed a regional research cooperation with China for the designing and launching satellites for long distance surveillance, subterranean resources, agrometeorology, and aerospace training at Iranian universities. Iran's Aerospace Organization's has been getting engaged in designing and manufacturing of a small multi-mission satellite with China and Thailand since 2005.

Since the 1990s, Iran started to develop a launch vehicle based on Shahab-3. The Shahab-3 is a liquid-fueled single-stage missile. The Iran Space Research Center started testing launch capabilities since early 2007 reaching 150–200 km altitude. These rockets were based on Shahab-3 series and were typically equipped with wind, air and temperature instruments. In August 2008, Iran developed a two-stage launch vehicle Safir-1 which launched a dummy satellite. In February 2009, Iran launched a satellite named Omid into orbit using the domestically built launch vehicle Safir-2, thus becoming the 9th nation to do so on Timeline of first orbital launches by country. Their Aerospace engineering achievement appears as the country has been under nearly 30 years of sanctions.

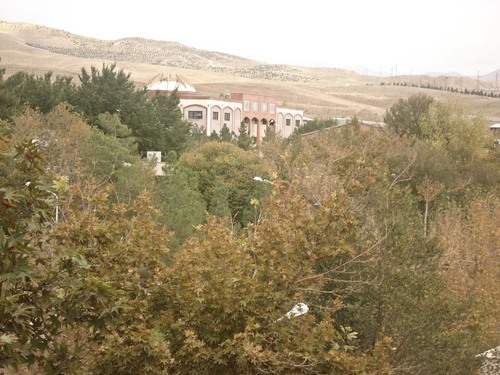
Main Campus

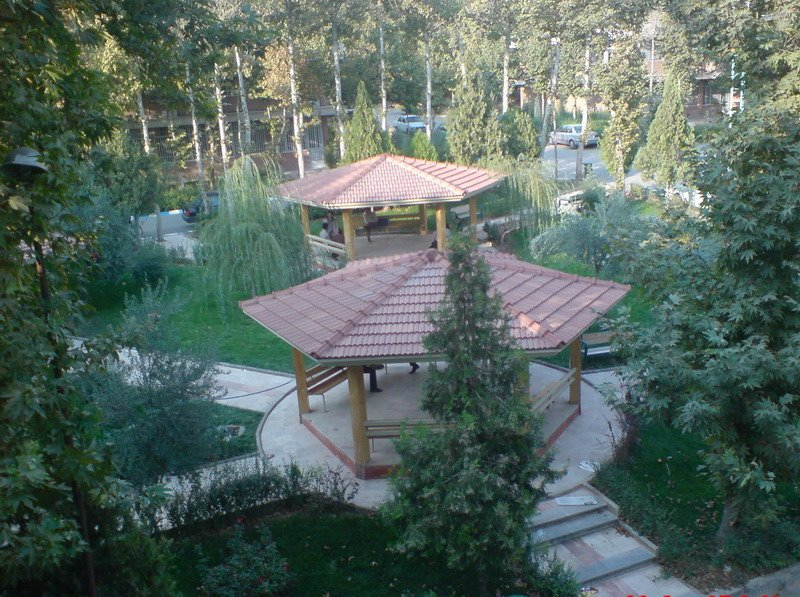

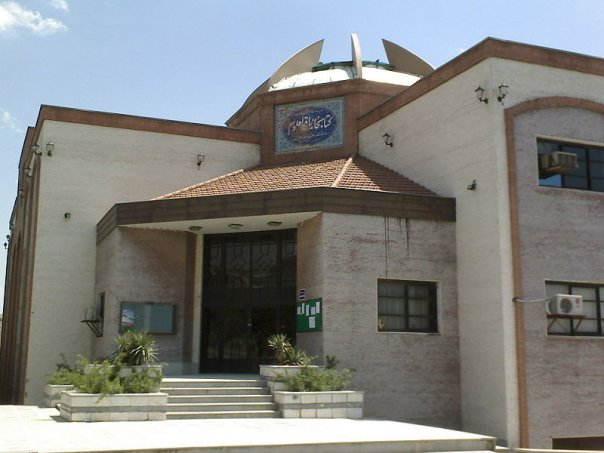
Central Library

== Academic profile ==
=== Admissions ===
Undergraduate admission to Imam Hossein University is limited to those students who pass the Iranian University Entrance Exam, known as Konkour (from the French Concours) administered annually by the Iranian Ministry of Science, Research and Technology. First priorities are given to those top students who had grade point averages (GPA) of at least 17 from 20 (equivalent to 85%) in high school, those top 100 of the 500,000 students who pass the national entrance examination, and those who select Imam Hossein University among their leading five choices.

=== Rankings ===
University rankings

Global
| SIR World - Overall | 663 (2020) |
| SIR World - Research | 339 (2020) |
| SIR World - Innovation | 493 (2020) |

National
| SIR National - Overall | 11 (2020) |
| SIR National - Research | 5 (2020) |
| SIR National - Innovation | 28 (2020) |
| ISC National - Overall | 11-15 (2018) |
| ISC National - Research | 30 (2018) |
| ISC National - Education | 9 (2018) |
| ISC National - Facilities | 1 (2018) |

According to the Islamic World Science Citation Database (ISC) partnered with Scopus and maintained by the Iranian Ministry of Science, Research and Technology, Imam Hossein University was ranked in Iran as 30th for research, 9th for education, 3rd for international reputation, 1st for facilities, and 2nd for economic activities in 2018. According to the SCImago Institutions Rankings (SIR), Imam Hossein University has 38th percentile in Overall, 18th percentile in Research, and 61st percentile in Innovation, and has an international rank of 663, and a national rank of 11 among 157 ranked Iranian institutions in 2020. In 2020, the SCImago Institutions Rankings also gives an international rank of 339 and a national rank of 5 in Research, an international rank of 493 and a national rank of 28 in Innovation, an international rank of 238 and a national rank of 25 in Societal. CIVILICA, Publisher of Iran conferences and scientific journal papers, also gave a total university rank of 64th and a state rank of 39th based on published papers in Iran conferences and scientific journals.

View source data.
National ranks of Imam Hossein University (2016–2020)

=== Postgraduate programs ===
Imam Hossein University has 33 Master's programs and 9 PhD programs approved by Ministry of Science, Research and Technology (Iran).

==== Master's programs ====
- Logistics
- Strategic Information Intelligence
- Strategic Defense Studies
- Military Geography
- Cell and Molecular Biology Sciences
- Organic Chemistry
- Analytical Chemistry
- Physical Chemistry
- Inorganic Chemistry
- Nuclear Physics
- Electrical Engineering (Electronics)
- Mechanical Systems Engineering (Applied Design)
- Telecommunication Engineering (Coding Theory)
- Mechanical Engineering (Applied Design)
- Aerospace Engineering (Aerodynamics)
- Aerospace Engineering (Aircraft Structures)
- Spacecraft propulsion (Liquid-propellant rocket)
- Spacecraft propulsion (Solid-fuel rocket)
- Systems Sciences
- Atomic, Molecular, and Optical Physics
- Crisis Management
- Defense Management (Education)
- Defense Management (Human Resources)
- Defense Management (Logistics and Commerce)
- Defense Management (Finance and Accounting)
- Defense Management (Navy)
- Defense Management (Army)
- Defense Management (Special Force)
- Defense Management (Basij Force)
- Defense Management (Air Force)
- Civil Defense (Design)
- Civil Defense (Aircraft Structures)
- Civil Defense (Cooperative Cyber Defense)

==== PhD programs ====
- Aerospace Mechanical Engineering (Applied Design)
- Industrial Engineering (Systems Engineering Research)
- Molecular Biotechnology
- Laser Physics
- Applied Mathematics (Coding Theory)
- Sociometry
- Crisis Management
- Military Intelligence
- Security Intelligence

=== Publications ===
A number of journals and books are published by Imam Hossein University. Among those:

- IHU Journal of Fluid Mechanics and Aerodynamics
- IHU Journal of Radar
- IHU Journal of Electromagnetism
- IHU Journal of Mechanics and Aerospace
- IHU Journal of Electronic Defense and Cyber
- IHU Journal of Civil Defense
- IHU Journal of Science and Culture
- IHU Journal of Defense Policy
- IHU Journal of Military Geography

== Organisation and structure ==
=== Faculties ===
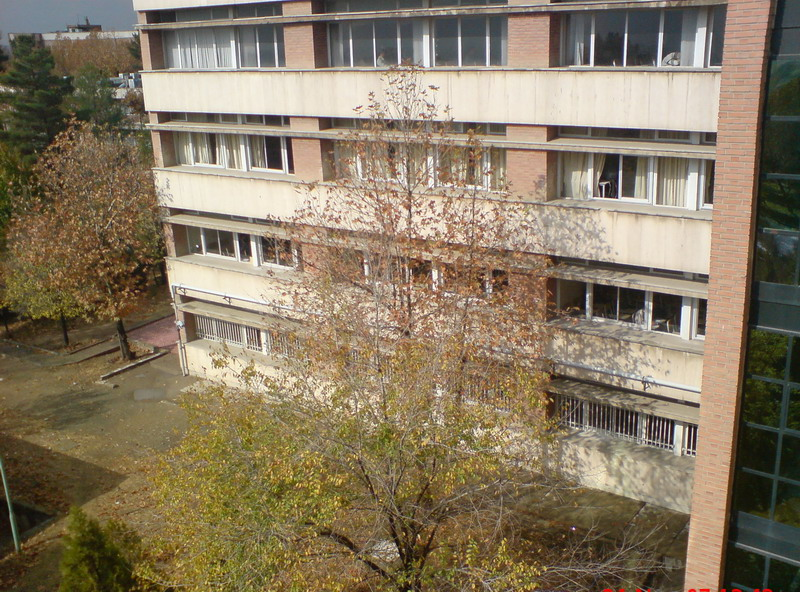
Faculty of Engineering (دانشکده علوم و مهندسی)

Initially Imam Hossein University included four faculties:

- Faculty of Engineering Science
  - Department of Mechanical Engineering
  - Department of Civil Engineering
  - Department of Electrical Engineering
  - Department of Computer Science Engineering
  - Department of Industrial Engineering
  - Department of Chemical Engineering
  - Department of Aerospace Engineering
- Faculty of Natural Science
  - Department of Physics
  - Department of Chemistry
  - Department of Mathematics
  - Department of Biology
- Faculty of Social Science (1987)
  - Department of Management
  - Department of Economics
  - Department of Information Technology Management
- Faculty of Medicine (1987)

Later another faculty was founded:

- Faculty of Military Science (1990)

In 1994, faculty of Medicine seceded to become the Baqiyatallah Medical Sciences University.

=== Facilities ===
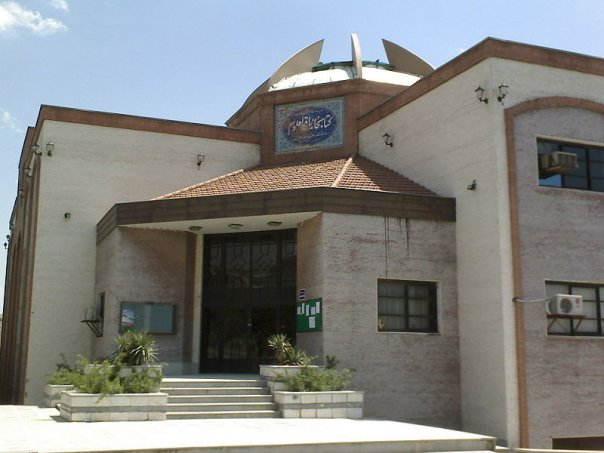
Central Library (کتابخانه دانشکده فنی و مهندسی باقرالعلوم)

The main buildings are located in Tehran, Shahid Babaei Highway near Tehran Pars Fourth Square, Hakimiyeh and Mini-city, include:

- Department of Mechanical Engineering
- Department of Electrical Engineering
- Department of Computer Engineering
- Department of Chemistry
- Department of Physics
- Department of Military Science
- Central Library
- Publication Office
- Restaurant

=== Associated institutes ===
- Physics Research Center (PHRC)
- Biological Research Center
- Chemical Research Center
- Aerospace Research Center
- Education Research Institute (ERI)
- Institute of Applied Physics (IAP)

The university cooperates with several institutes related to IRGC and Defense Industries Organization. Among those:

- Baqiyatallah Medical Sciences University
- Malek-Ashtar University of Technology
- Centers for Science and Technological Growth
- Biological Research Center of Malek Ashtar University
- Research Center for Direct Biotechnology
- Sina Industry (Vira Laboratories)
- Shahid Hemmat Industrial Group (SHIG)
- Parchin Site
- Lavizan II Site
- Sanam College
- Tehran's Gostaresh Research Center
- Ya Makhdi industrial complex
- Pasteur Institute of Iran
- Aerospace Industries Organization (AIO)
- Shahid Meisami Complex
- Ore Processing Center (OPC)
- Biological Research Center of SIO
- Sanam Industrial Group/Aerospace Industries Organization (AIO)
- Damghan's Weapons Industry
- Kimia Maadan (KM) Company
- Baltic State Technical University (until 1998)
- China Aerospace Science and Technology Corporation
- National Center for Genetic Engineering and Biotechnology Research
- The Institute of Biochemistry and Biophysics (IBB)
- Tehran's Biochemical and Bioenvironmental Research Center
- Group of Fermentation and Biological Technology
- Shahid Khassan Bagheri Industrial-factory Program (SHBIFG)
- Shahid Bagheri Industrial Group (SBIG)
- Instrumentation Factories Plant (IFP)
- Shahid Shafizadem Industrial Complex
- Missile Industrial Group at Parchin
- Shahid Babaye Industrial Complex (SBIC)
- Mechanical Systems Industrial Group (MIG)
- Special Industrial Groups of the Ministry of Defense (MIDSPCIG)

== Related organizations ==
=== Lavizan Technical Research Center ===
Originally Lavizan was a heavily fortified Army Garrison housing Shah's Imperial Guards. During the Iranian Revolution, the garrison fell to Revolutionaries after a fight in which several officers of the guard were killed. The site was later on converted to a research facility. The Lavizan Technical Site includes faculties of installations industries and metallurgy. According to a document, the alleged Iranian nuclear warheads were being stored in the Lavizan military camp in the Teheran area in 1992. Another document discusses the production of a solid fuel missile prototype completed in Lavizan.

A satellite image of 10 May 2004 showed that Iran had almost totally razed part of the Lavizan Technical Research Center. It showed Iran had been demolishing buildings at Lavizan. The Lavizan Center had imported a whole-body counter (WBC), a device used to identify and measure the radioactive material in the body of human beings and animals. On 29 June 2004, El Baradei said that Iran had accepted that the alleged concealed nuclear site in Tehran was a military-research complex before it was razed. The Iranian authorities stated that this was a physics institute later on turned to be a biotechnology research and development center.

=== Aerospace Industries Organization ===
Aerospace Industries Organization (AIO) is a leading industrial subsidiary of the Ministry of Defense. More than 13 large factories with over 10,000 expert personnel are occupied in manufacturing a vast variety of military and non-military purposes. Products include different types of weapons such as guns, rockets, missiles, mortars, bombs, rocket launchers, field kitchens, gyroscopes, transportation means, police equipment, and helmets. Engineering services include precision machining, metal forming, software services, quality control test, dimensional measurement, CNC machine, and Coordinate Measuring Machine (CMM).

The Aerospace Industries Organization (AIO), also known as the Sanam Industrial Group, is the Defense Industries Organization (DIO) Missile Industries Group. Sanam Industries Group is said to be the lead organization for the development of the Shahab-3 missile. In 1998, China Aerospace Science and Technology Corporation had reportedly negotiated an agreement with Sanam Industries Group to provide telemetry infrastructure for Iran's Shahab-3 and Shahab-4 ballistic missile.

Baltic State Technical University in Saint Petersburg has allegedly contracted with the Sanam Industrial group to train Iranian students in order to design long-range solid fuel rocket boosters. They together created a center known as Persepolis as part of a contract concluded in 1996. On 22 June 1998, Iranian students were expelled from Baltic State Technical University as part of Russia's international obligations to control the spread of missile technology.

In addition to military products, the Sanam Industrial Group also produces non-military products to convene domestic and export markets demands including TVs, vacuum cleaners, washing machines, various types of grinding wheels, stainless steel dishes, industrial fans, motor pumps, and automotive parts. The Sanam Washing Machine use Korean SAMSUNG technology, by which it becomes a powerful, economic and durable washing machine. Sanam Industrial Group in Parchin is licensed by the Italian company Lombardini to fabricate internal combustion engines, that are used in automotive, agricultural, industrial and marine applications.

=== Parchin site ===
Parchin Complex, 30 kilometers southeast of Tehran, was the site for the implementation of a variety of defense projects. Parchin was the center of the Defense Industries Organization's (DIO) Chemical industry, and, possibly, the home of the main producers of the Iran's missiles. Parchin was opened in 1939, and was in operation since before the Second World War. Very few information was available about the post-Revolutionary Iranian arms industry. On 25 August 1999, it included the Parchin Chemical Factories (PCF). PCF was equipped with modern technology producing various commercial explosives, and chemical material.

Parchin is one of Iran's major chemical weapons facilities, along with the facilities located at Damghan, Esfahan and Qazvin. US intelligence said Iran has been continuing to improve and develop its chemical warfare production infrastructure and munitions arsenal until 2003. US intelligence reporting Iran tries to dual-use facilities could quickly field chemical agents, but are not mainly active in military. It made also question the character of the facilities at Parchin.

On 29 December 2003, the Wall Street Journal reported that, Ahmad Shirzad, a deputy from the city of Isfahan, stated that there was a large nuclear underground facility in Parchin. In an article in the Washington Times, on 7 March 2004, claimed that Iran's nuclear weapons program included use of Belarus-Russian filtering and high-temperature melting technologies for uranium enrichment. The accurate technique supposedly involved was unclear, but would appear to have been thermal diffusion.

The generally Parchin institute represents the chief center of Iran's military industry, so a nuclear program would by now include all the proficiency required within commuting distance. The suspect area was physically isolated from other components, which implies that it was not part of the ammo, chemical or missile programs. The United States made also questions whether Iran is testing high explosives at Parchin. Nonetheless, Hossein Mousavian, Iran's chief delegate to the IAEA, rejected all claims about a nuclear testing area at Parchin. He categorically denied any nuclear activities in Parchin. He accused the US of deliberately using misinformation to embarrass Iran at IAEA hearings.

Jay C. Davis, former head of the Defense Threat Reduction Agency at the US Department of Defense, said neither the design of the facility nor the nature of the tests is unique to nuclear weapons. Davis added that environmental sampling done by IAEA inspectors could detect the presence of by-products used in the testing of high explosives for a nuclear weapon. On 17 September 2004 IAEA head El Baradei said his organization had found no sign of nuclear-related activity at the Parchin site in Iran, which several US officials had said might be to secret nuclear weapons research. Iran allowed IAEA inspectors to visit the Parchin military site in the interests of transparency, but the visit was limited to only few areas.

On 1 March 2005, Iran abandoned a second request by the IAEA to visit again the Parchin site. However, the IAEA was eventually allowed entrance to the Parchin facility in November 2005. The IAEA did not observe any unusual activities in the buildings visited, and the results of the analysis of environmental samples did not indicate the presence of nuclear material.

== Notable alumni and staff ==
- Fereydoon Abbasi, a nuclear physics professor at Shahid Beheshti University, the head of the physics department at Imam Hossein University, and the head of the Atomic Energy Organization of Iran (AEOI).
- Mohsen Fakhrizadeh, a professor of nuclear physics at the Imam Hussein University, a senior nuclear physicist at Ministry of Defence and Armed Forces Logistics and former head of the Physics Research Center (PHRC) at the Imam Hussein University.
- Masoud Alimohammadi, a particle physics professor at the University of Tehran and Imam Hossein University.
- Majid Shahriari, a nuclear engineer at the Atomic Energy Organization of Iran, a professor at Shahid Beheshti University and Imam Hossein University.
- Ardeshir Hosseinpour, an assistant professor at Malek Ashtar University of Technology, also taught at Shiraz University and Imam Hossein University.
- Mohsen Rezaee, one of co-founders of the university and a lecturer at Imam Hossein University.
- Mostafa Ahmadi-Roshan, graduated from Sharif University, an Iranian nuclear physicist and a professor at Imam Hossein University, and a deputy secretary of commerce at Natanz uranium enrichment facility
- Parviz Fattah, an Iranian politician, former member of Revolutionary Guard and former minister of energy in Mahmoud Ahmadinejad's cabinet, got a master's degree in systems engineering from the Imam Hussein University
- Masoud Mir Kazemi, an Iranian politician, former minister of Petroleum of Iran, former minister of commerce of Iran, a member of Parliament of Iran, and a lecturer at Imam Hossein University.
- Mohammad Soleimani, a former Minister of Communication and Information Technology of Iran in Mahmoud Ahmadinejad's cabinet, a professor at Iran University of Science and Technology and Imam Hossein University.
- Mohammad Ardakani, a former Minister of Cooperatives in Mahmoud Ahmadinejad's cabinet, a professor at University of Tehran and Imam Hossein University.
- Mehdi Isazadeh, an Iranian politician, a member of Islamic Consultative Assembly, a member of Iran-Turkey Friendship society, got a master's degree in defense management from the Imam Hussein University
- Hossein Saffar Harandi, a former Minister of Culture of Iran in Mahmoud Ahmadinejad's cabinet, graduated from the Iran University of Science and Technology with a degree in civil engineering, and got a degree on strategic management.
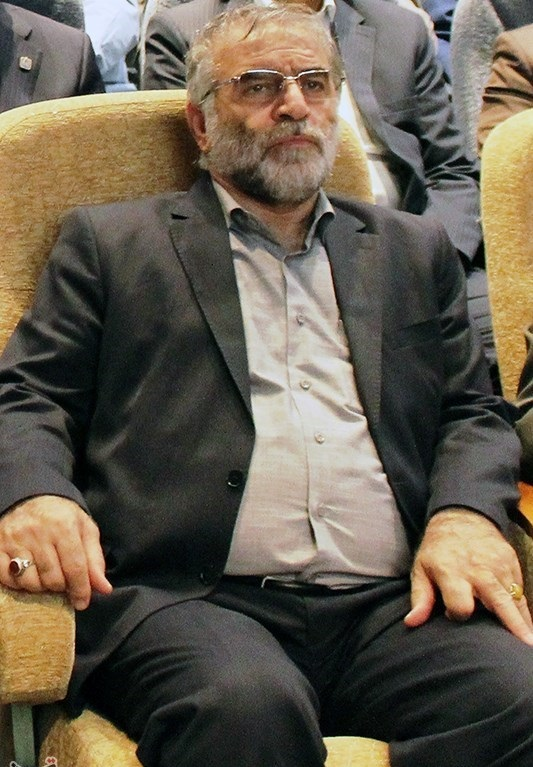
Mohsen Fakhrizadeh, a nuclear physics professor at Imam Hussein University, and former head of the Physics Research Center.

Mohsen Rezaee, a co-founder of Imam Hossein University and a lecturer at Imam Hossein University

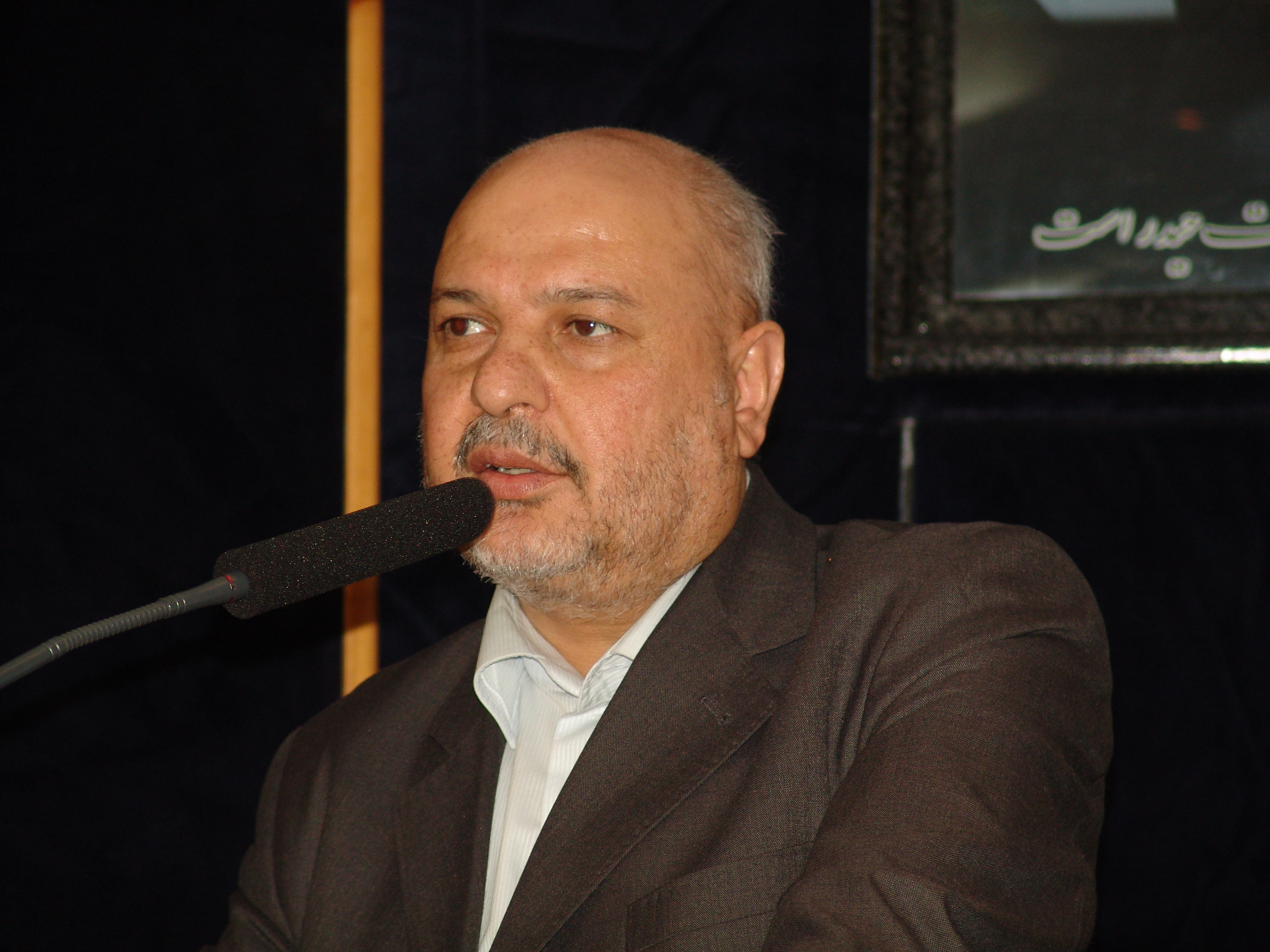
Masoud Mir Kazemi, a former minister of Petroleum of Iran, former minister of commerce of Iran, and a lecturer at Imam Hossein University

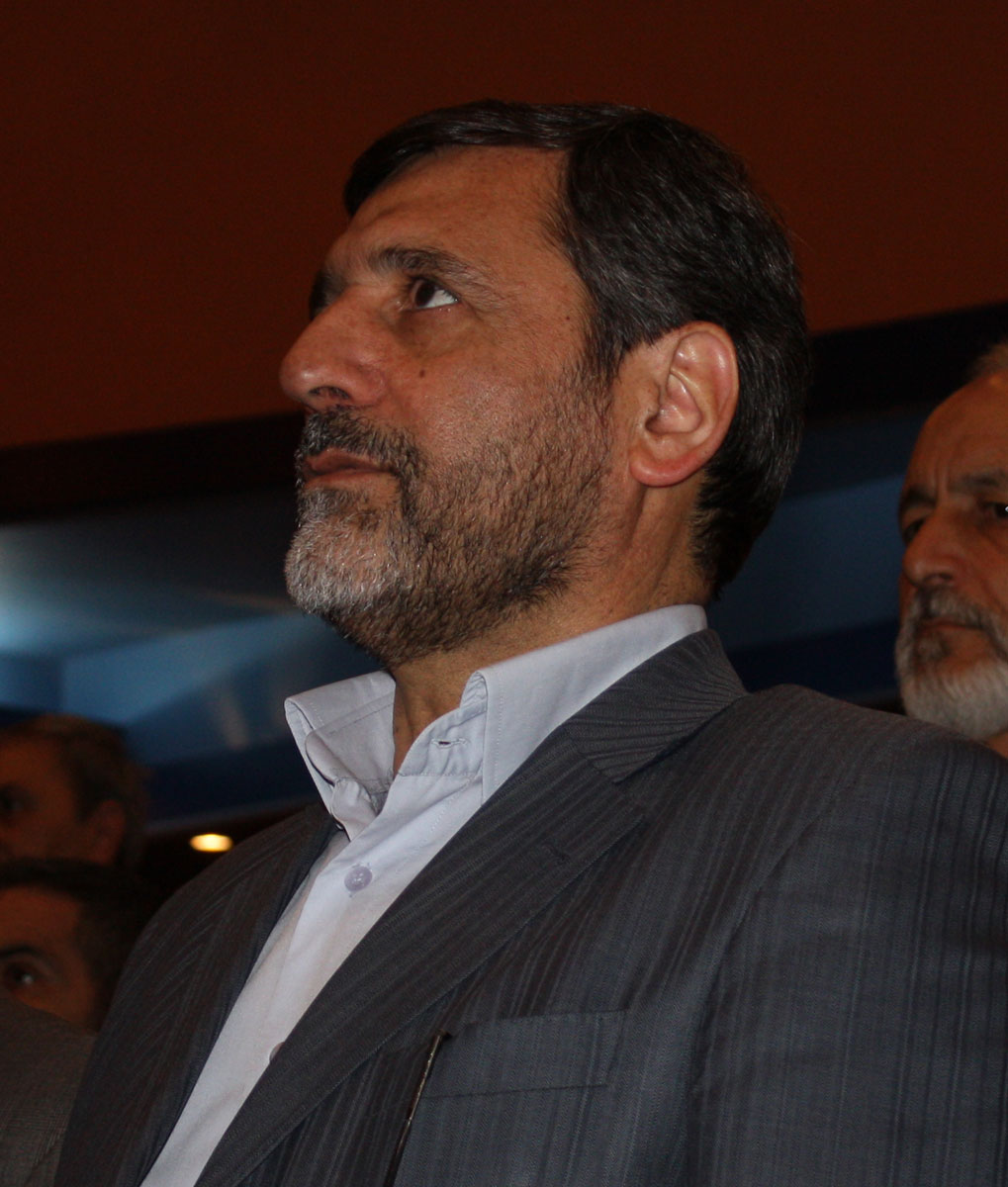
Hossein Saffar Harandi, a former minister of culture of Iran, and got a degree on strategic management

== List of chancellors of Imam Hossein University ==
The chancellors of Imam Hossein University since its foundation:

- Mahdi Mousavi Zare (1984–1985)
- Masoud Hajjarian (1985–1989)
- Mohammad Ebrahim Sanjaghi (1989)
- Ali Hosseini-Tash (1989–1994)
- Alireza Andalib (1994–1998)
- Alireza Afshar (1998–2000)
- Ahmad Fazaeli (2000–2005)
- Ali Akbar Ahmadian (2005–2007)
- Reza Karami-Nia (2007)
- Ali Hosseini-Tash (2007-2009)
- Hossein Zarif-Manesh (2009–2013)
- Mohammad-Reza Hassani Ahangar (2013–Present)

Guards Officer Training

- Alireza Tamizifar (2009–2010)
- Morteza Saffari (2010–2018)
- Ali Fazlii (2018-2020)
- Noman Gholami (2020-2024)
- Mohammad Karami (2024–2025)
- Reza Shaban (2025–present)

== Military Service Reduction at Imam Hossein University ==
Imam Hossein University, affiliated with the Islamic Revolutionary Guard Corps (IRGC), offers research project opportunities for eligible military conscripts. These projects, known as service reduction or exemption projects, are designed to utilize the scientific and technical expertise of qualified graduates and researchers in fields related to the armed forces.

Applicants are generally required to hold at least a master’s degree, have no record of draft evasion or criminal background, and demonstrate sufficient academic and professional competence. Requests for participation can be submitted either through referral by university professors or via direct application to the university’s research departments. Upon approval, a project aligned with the applicant’s area of expertise is assigned, and the corresponding service reduction is determined after successful completion of the project.

== Service Reduction Application at Imam Hossein University ==
There are two main ways to apply for a military service reduction project at Imam Hossein University. The first method is through a formal referral by university faculty members or authorized military personnel who recommend qualified candidates for research collaboration. The second option allows individuals to apply directly to the university’s education or research departments and present their academic background and research interests. Applicants’ academic and disciplinary qualifications are reviewed, and if approved, a suitable project is assigned based on their expertise.

== See also ==
- List of universities in Iran
- Baqiyatallah Medical Sciences University
- Iranian Space Agency
- Defense Industries Organization
- Iran Electronics Industries
- Iran Aviation Industries Organization
- Nuclear program of Iran
