= Nuclear facilities in Iran =

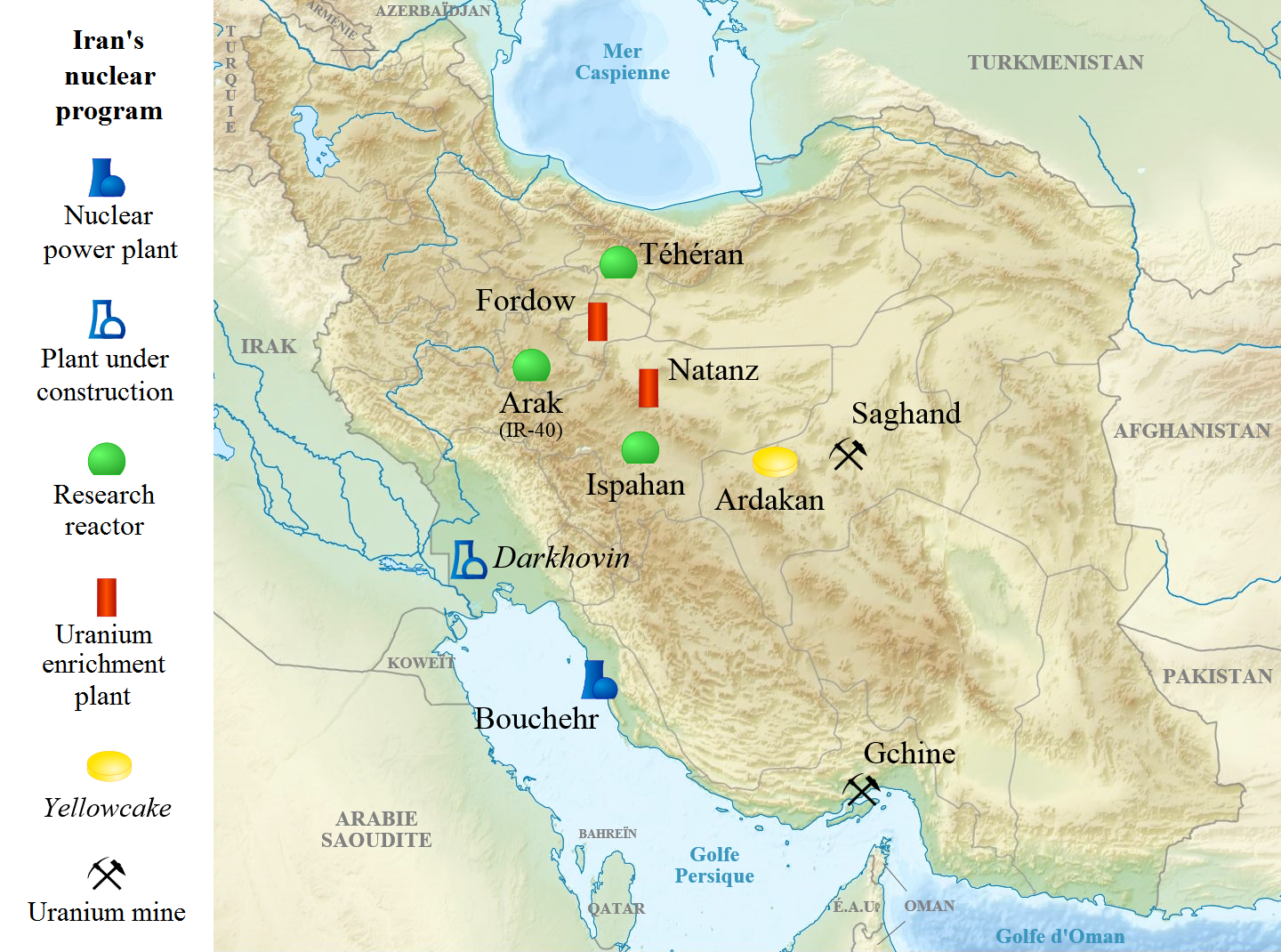
A map of the main sites of Iran's nuclear program

Iran's nuclear program comprises a number of nuclear facilities, including nuclear reactors and various nuclear fuel cycle facilities.

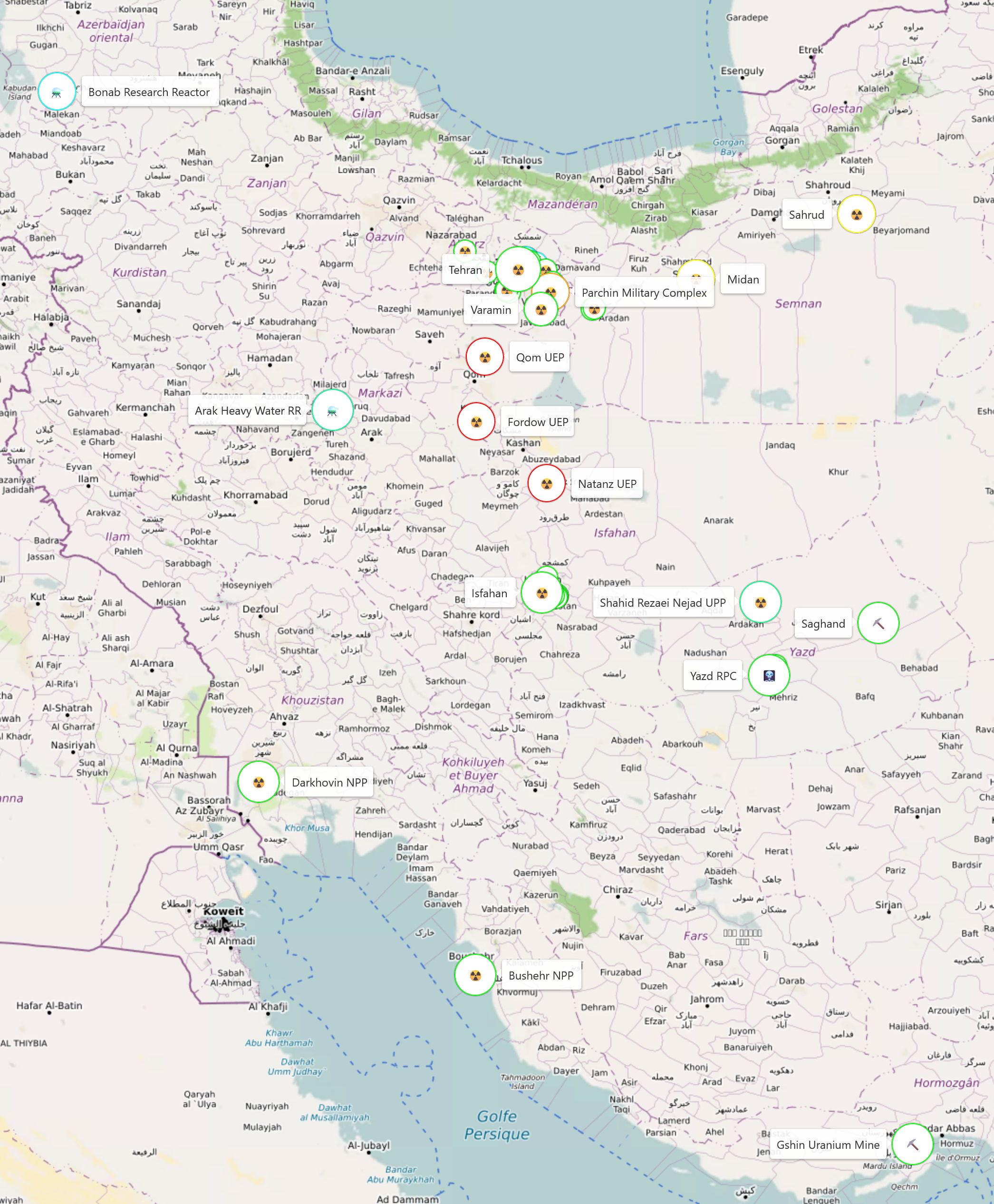
A map of all reported nuclear-related sites in Iran

== Anarak ==
Anarak, near Yazd, has a nuclear waste storage site.

== Arak ==
The Arak area in northwestern Iran has several industrial complexes, some with ties to the nuclear program, in particular the IR-40 reactor under construction and a heavy water (aka deuterium oxide D_{2}O) production plant, both nearby to the north-west of the city of Arak. In the late 1990s, one of these complexes may have manufactured a high-explosive test chamber transferred to Parchin, which the International Atomic Energy Agency (IAEA) has asked to visit. The Arak area is also thought to hold factories capable of producing high-strength aluminum rotors for IR-1 centrifuges. The design of the reactor in Arak is very similar to those used to make plutonium-239 for the production of nuclear weapons, and the reactor itself was said to have been capable of producing enough plutonium for two nuclear weapons per year.

Arak was one of the two sites exposed by a spokesman for the People's Mujahedin of Iran in 2002. In August 2006, Iran announced the inauguration of the Arak plant for the production of heavy water. According to Iran this reactor is intended to replace the life-expired 1967 Tehran Nuclear Research Center research reactor, mainly involved in the production of radioisotopes for medical and agricultural purposes. The spent fuel of the reactor contains plutonium suitable for making the core of a nuclear bomb; which would be lighter, cheaper and more powerful that than that made of highly enriched uranium.

In 2009, Iran granted the IAEA access to the facility, but did not allow them to see its detailed plans, thereby keeping its purpose unclear. It was assessed by the P5+1, charged with negotiating with Iran over their nuclear program, that the completed reactor was capable of producing 9–10 kg of weapons-grade plutonium, enough for up to two nuclear weapons, annually. Between 2011 and November 2013 the IAEA was denied access to the heavy water plant which had become operational.

In 2014, under the Joint Comprehensive Plan of Action, the Arak reactor was to be redesigned and deemed incapable of producing large amounts of weapons grade plutonium. This was to be achieved by modifying the calandria, a metal lattice which holds specialized tubes that contain the fuel assemblies and allow the heavy water to go through them, holding natural uranium fuel which is best suited to produce weapons-grade plutonium. The modification involved filling the tubes with cement and installing a newly designed core that would not operate on natural uranium. The new design would operate on low-enriched uranium and would allow the reactor the continued production of radio isotopes for medical purposes without making weapons-grade plutonium as a by-product.

In January 2016, Iran reported that they had removed the original calandria from the core of the reactor, but Iranian officials stated that only the "cavities, and not its heart" had been filled with concrete. Also in January 2016, Iran propagated a photo-shopped image of the reactor completely filled with cement, even though it had explicitly refused to carry out such an action, and this caused great confusion as to what had been done. Despite the preventative procedures, in February, and again in November of that same year, Iran exceeded its allowed limit of stockpiled heavy water. Iran also transferred over 80 metric tonnes of Heavy Water beyond its borders to Oman, thereby maintaining control over these resources without technically breaching the agreement.

In 2017, the facility was renamed the Khondab Heavy Water Research Reactor. In January 2019, the head of Iran’s Atomic Energy Organization (AEOI), Ali Akbar Salehi gave an interview on Iran’s Channel 4 TV in which he stated that Iran had covertly imported a second set of tubes, identical to those which were filled with cement, allowing Iran to build a duplicate of the original calandria for the Arak reactor.

Iran notified the IAEA that it intended to bring the reactor online in 2026.

On 19 June 2025, the site was hit in an Israeli air strike which ensured that Arak could not again be usable for nuclear development.

On 27 March 2026, the facility was again hit in an Israeli air strike.

== Ardakan ==
The possible existence of a nuclear-related facility near Ardakan (also spelled Ardekan or Erdekan) was first reported in July 2003, by the National Council of Resistance of Iran. In September 2003, Mohammad Ghannadi-Maragheh, Vice President for Nuclear Fuel Production of the Atomic Energy Organization of Iran (AEOI), said that the facility was a uranium mill, with an annual capacity of 120,000 metric tonnes of ore and an annual output of 50 metric tons of uranium.

Iran told the International Atomic Energy Agency (IAEA) that the facility would be hot tested July 2004, producing 40 to 50 kg of Yellowcake, but as of 2008 Iran had provided no further information to the IAEA on its operation.

In March 2026, the Ardakan yellowcake production plant was damaged in an Israeli airstrike.

== Bonab ==
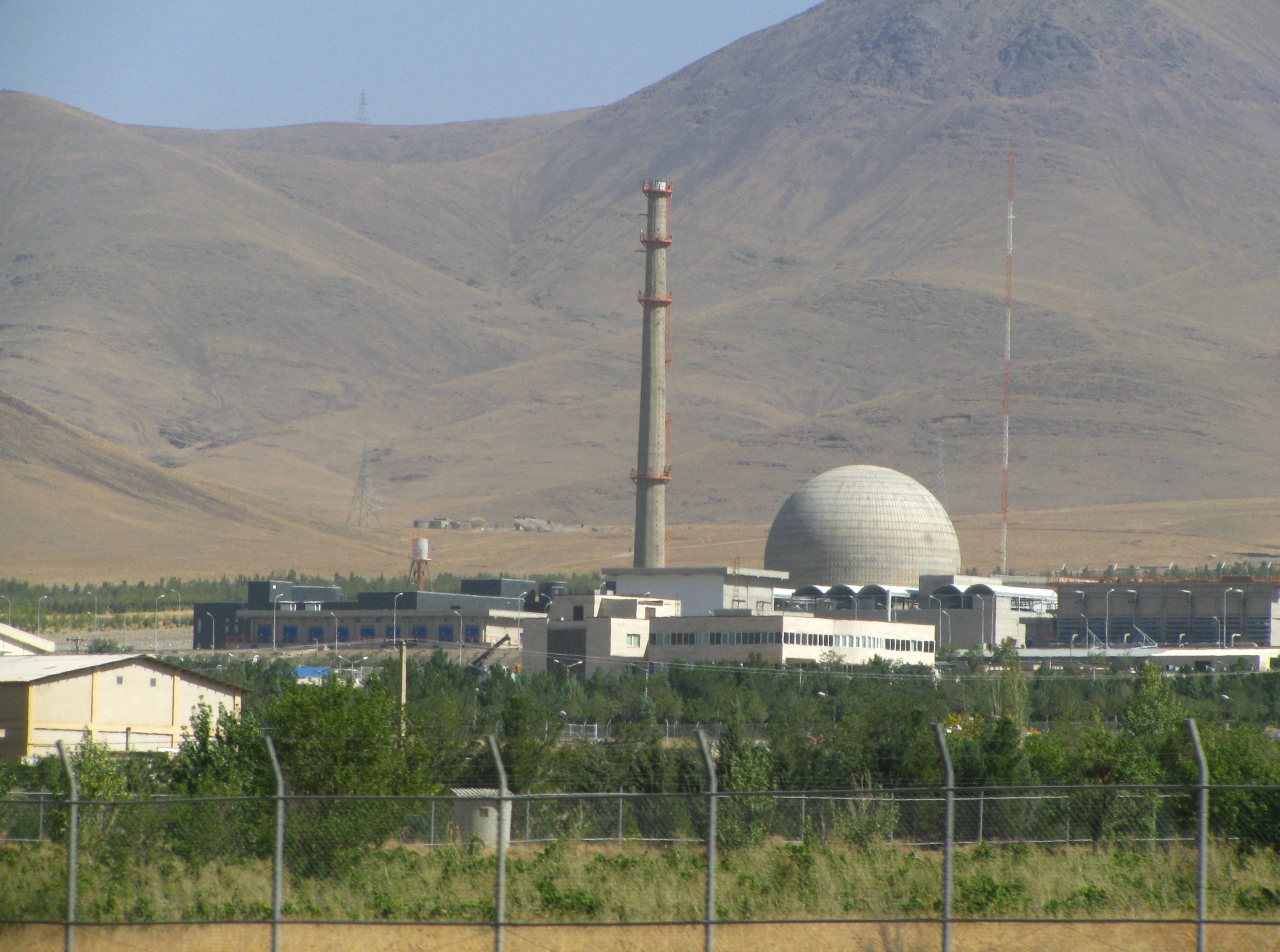
Arak's IR-40 Heavy water reactor

The Atomic Energy Research Center at Bonab is investigating the applications of nuclear technology in agriculture. It is run by the AEOI.

== Bushehr ==
The Bushehr Nuclear Power Plant is located 17 kilometres (11 mi) south-east of the city of Bushehr, on the Persian Gulf. Construction started in 1975 but was halted in July 1979 following the 1979 Iranian Revolution. The reactor was damaged by Iraqi air strikes during the Iran-Iraq war in the mid-1980s. Construction resumed in 1995, when Iran signed a contract with Russian company Atomstroyexport to install into the existing Bushehr I building a 915 MWe VVER-1000 pressurized water reactor. In December 2007 Russia started delivering nuclear fuel to the Bushehr nuclear power plant. The construction was completed in March 2009.

On 13 August 2010, Russia announced that fuel would be loaded into the plant beginning on 21 August, which would mark the beginning of the plant being considered a nuclear facility. Within six months after the fuel loading, the plant was planned to be fully operational. Tehran and Moscow have established a joint venture to operate Bushehr because Iran has not yet had enough experience in maintaining such installations. However, Iran may begin almost all operational control of the reactor within two or three years.

On 23 September 2013, operational control of Bushehr was transferred to Iran. and in November 2014 Iran and Russia signed an agreement to build two new nuclear reactors at the Bushehr site, with an option of six more at other sites later. Construction formally started on 14 March 2017.

== Chalus ==
In 1995, Iranian exiles living in Europe claimed Iran was building a secret facility for building nuclear weapons in a mountain 20 kilometres from the town of Chalus. In October 2003 Mohamed ElBaradei announced that "In terms of inspections, so far, we have been allowed to visit those sites to which we have requested access". It therefore appears the allegations about the Chalus site were unfounded.

== Darkovin ==
Iran declared on 6 March 2007 that it has started construction of a domestically built nuclear power plant with capacity of 360 MW in Darkovin, in southwestern Iran.

== Fordow ==
The Fordow Fuel Enrichment Plant is a nuclear facility dug deep into a mountain near the city of Qom, and located approximately 160 km south of Tehran. Originally an Islamic Revolutionary Guard Corps missile base, it was later converted into an underground uranium enrichment facility. After Natanz, Fordow is the second pilot enrichment plant belonging to Iran, and is considered Iran's best sheltered nuclear site as it is believed to be buried up to 80m deep and has been described as being about three floors below ground. Despite early compliance with the JCPOA according to which Iran was to refrain from Uranium enrichment, it was discovered in 2023 that the facility was modified to continue the enrichment process, and uranium enriched to 83.7%, just short of the 90% required for a nuclear weapon, was located at the site.

Existence of the then-unfinished Fordow Fuel Enrichment Plant (FFEP) was disclosed to the IAEA by Iran on 21 September 2009, but only after the site became known to Western intelligence services. Western officials strongly condemned Iran for not disclosing the site earlier; U.S. President Barack Obama said that Fordow had been under U.S. surveillance. In its initial declaration, Iran stated that the purpose of the facility was the production of UF_{6} enriched up to 5% U_{235}, and that the facility was being built to contain 16 cascades, with a total of approximately 3,000 centrifuges. The facility consists of two enrichment halls containing the centrifuges.

Iran argues that this disclosure was consistent with its legal obligations under its Safeguards Agreement with the IAEA, which Iran claims requires Iran to declare new facilities 180 days before they receive nuclear material. The IAEA stated that Iran was bound by its agreement in 2003 to declare the facility as soon as Iran decided to construct it. Later, in September 2011, Iran said it would move its production of 20% LEU to Fordow from Natanz, and enrichment started in December 2011. The Fordow plant was constructed at a depth of 80–90 m under the rocks. According to the Institute for Science and International Security. In July 2015, Iran agreed to the Joint Comprehensive Plan of Action (JCPOA) which dictated that Iran was to cease all uranium enrichment for 15 years, with the exception of limited stable isotope production, and was to convert the facility into a scientific research center.

According to the IAEA, Iran initially complied, however, a surprise inspection in February 2023 revealed that Iran had violated the agreements by covertly modifying the facility's design to enable further uranium enrichment. In March 2023, the IAEA reported that it had discovered uranium which had been enriched to 83.7% purity in Fordow, while research reactors require enrichment of only 20%, and a nuclear weapon requires enrichment of 90%. By August 2024, Iran had increased the number of centrifuges in Fordow and had installed at least 10 cascades (clusters) of advanced IR-6 centrifuges, enabling further uranium enrichment.

On 22 June 2025, at around 2:30 AM local time, Fordow was attacked by the US Air Force. It was reported that six B-2 'Spirit' bombers dropped 12 GBU-57A/B Massive Ordnance Penetrator (MOP) bombs at the plant.

On 26 September 2025, commenting to Reuters for the first time about the US attack on Fordow, Rafael Grossi confirmed that "almost all sensitive equipment" at the site had been destroyed. However, he added that if Iran chose to further enrich their existing stockpile of uranium to 90 percent, it would only take them a few weeks to complete the process.

== Isfahan ==
The nuclear facilities located in and near Isfahan include the Isfahan Nuclear Technology Center (INTC), the Isfahan Uranium Conversion Facility (UCF), the Isfahan Fuel Manufacturing Plant (FMP), the Isfahan Fuel Element Cladding Plant, the Isfahan Nuclear Fuel Research and Production Center (NFRPC), and the Isfahan Nuclear Waste Storage Facility, and In July 2022, Iran announced plans to build a new nuclear research reactor at the Isfahan site.

Isfahan is suspected of being the primary location for Iran's secret nuclear weapon development program. In September 2008, IAEA experts stated that they only had limited access in Isfahan, and that a quantity of uranium sufficient for six nuclear weapons, were removed from Isfahan to undisclosed locations while still at a stage in the enrichment process which was not monitored. In June 2022, the IAEA reported that 90% of Iran's most highly enriched uranium was moved to facilities in Isfahan, which house the equipment used to convert uranium gas into uranium metal.

In August 2025, the Center for Strategic and International Studies confirmed that satellite imagery taken on July 22, 2025 showed that the facility suffered "extensive damage" in airstrikes carried out in June 2025. Even by the time the images were taken, "limited activity" was taking place at the complex, with Iran making "some efforts" to clear out roads and stabilize "some structures."

=== Isfahan Nuclear Technology Center ===
The Isfahan Nuclear Technology Center, one of the largest nuclear research centers in Iran, is located at the University of Isfahan. It was established in 1984 and was built with Chinese assistance. The INTC employs 3000 scientists and operates three research reactors, a critical assembly, a subcritical assembly, a hexafluoride conversion facility, a fuel production plant, a zirconium cladding plant, as well as other facilities and laboratories. In August 2003, the Atomic Energy Organization of Iran (AEOI) sent a letter to the IAEA in which it stated that experiments in heavy water production in the INTC began in the mid 1980s, pointing to a laboratory-scale heavy-water production facility on location, which later prompted the construction of a full scale heavy water reactor.

=== Isfahan Uranium Conversion Facility ===
The Uranium Conversion Facility (UCF) at Isfahan converts yellowcake into uranium oxide, uranium metal, uranium tetrafluoride (UF_{4}), and uranium hexafluoride (UF_{6}), which is injected into centrifuges for further enrichment. According to an Iranian admission to the IAEA in July 2003, the UCF was constructed from designs obtained outside Iran, which allowed them to build the facility and its conversion equipment indigenously. The facility was intended to supply UF6 to the enrichment facility in Natanz and uranium dioxide (UO_{2}) as fuel to the heavy water reactor in Arak. The UFC also acts as a storage facility for nuclear waste products of the TRR and the MIX facility in Tehran.

=== Isfahan Nuclear Fuel Research and Production Center ===
The Isfahan Nuclear Fuel Research and Production Center (NFRPC) was established in 1974 with French assistance, for providing scientific and technical support for Iran's nuclear power plant program, and conducting fuel analysis and research, including uranium mining, conversion and fuel production. The NFRPC consists of a Nuclear Engineering Department, a Metallurgical Engineering and Fuel Department, a Chemistry Department, and a Miniature Neutron Source Reactor Department. Production of experimental fuel for Water Water Energy Reactors (WWER) is conducted by the Fuel Fabrication Laboratory under The Metallurgical Engineering and Fuel Department.

In 2004, construction began on a Fuel Manufacturing Plant (FMP) intended to produce fuel rods for both the IR-40 heavy water reactor and the Bushehr Nuclear Power Plant. Its completion was stalled due to missing equipment and sanctions of both the UN and USA.

As of late October 2004, the site is 70% operational with 21 of 24 workshops completed. There is also a Zirconium Production Plant (ZPP) located nearby that produces the necessary ingredients and alloys for nuclear reactors. There is also a Fuel Plate Fabrication Plant (FPFP) at Isfahan.

As of 2022 another new nuclear construction development was built in suburban Isfahan.

== Karaj ==
The Center for Agricultural Research and Nuclear Medicine at Hashtgerd was established in 1991 and is run by the AEOI.

== Lashkar Abad ==
Lashkar Abad is a pilot plant for isotope separation. Established in 2002, the site was first exposed by Alireza Jafarzadeh in May 2003, which led to the inspection of the site by the IAEA. Laser enrichment experiments were carried out there, however, the plant has been shut down since Iran declared it has no intentions of enriching uranium using the laser isotope separation technique. In September 2006, Alireza Jafarzadeh claimed that the site has been revived by Iran and that laser enrichment has been taking place at this site.

== Lavizan ==
(35°46′23″N 51°29′52″E) All buildings at the former Lavizan-Shian Technical Research Center site were demolished between August 2003 and March 2004. Environmental samples taken by IAEA inspectors showed no trace of radiation. The site is to be returned to the City of Tehran.

According to Reuters, claims by the US that topsoil has been removed and the site had been sanitized could not be verified by IAEA investigators who visited Lavizan:

Washington accused Iran of removing a substantial amount of topsoil and rubble from the site and replacing it with a new layer of soil, in what U.S. officials said might have been an attempt to cover clandestine nuclear activity at Lavizan.

Former U.S. ambassador to the IAEA, Kenneth Brill, accused Iran in June of using "the wrecking ball and bulldozer" to sanitize Lavizan prior to the arrival of U.N. inspectors.

But another diplomat close to the IAEA told Reuters that on-site inspections of Lavizan produced no proof that any soil had been removed at all.

=== Lavizan-3 ===
On 24 January 2015, Iranian dissidents of the National Council of Resistance of Iran claimed a covert uranium enrichment facility, called Lavizan-3, existed just outside Tehran. The NCRI's claims were subsequently rejected by nuclear proliferation researchers such as Jeffrey Lewis based on further analysis of satellite imagery and the discovery that NCRI had portrayed a commercial company's reinforced door advertisement as part of the alleged nuclear facility. A report of the Federation of American Scientists portrayed the allegations as "debunked" in 2017. NCRI's allegations were made in the weeks before final agreements were reached between Iran and the USA over the JCPOA, which the group opposed.

== Natanz ==
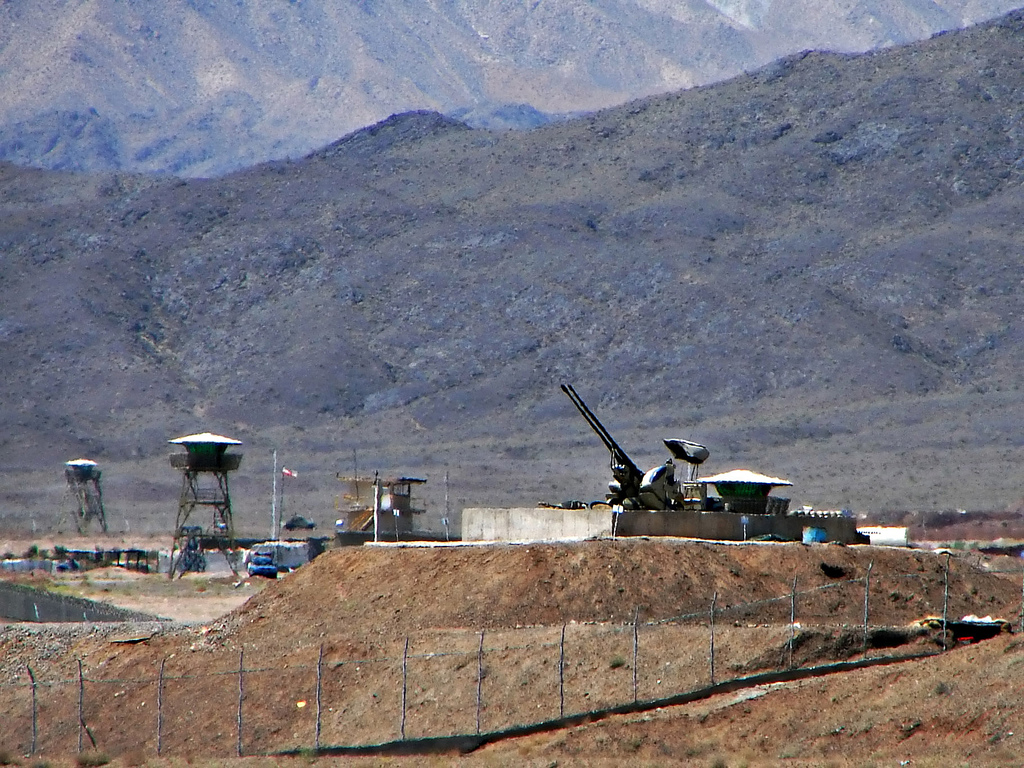
The Natanz Nuclear Facility

The Natanz nuclear facility is located in old Kashan-Natanz near the village of Deh-Zireh, outside the city of Qom, about 40 km southeast of Kashan and approximately 160 km north of Esfahan. It is Iran's primary uranium enrichment site, and consists of both the Fuel Enrichment Plant (FEP) and the Pilot Fuel Enrichment Plant (PFEP). The Uranium enrichment plant in Natanz was first exposed by the National Council of Resistance of Iran (NCRI) in 2002, leading to emerging concerns about Iran's nuclear program.

On 28 October 2020, the International Atomic Energy Agency (IAEA) released satellite images revealing that Iran had begun the construction of an underground plant near its nuclear facility at Natanz. In November 2024, according to the Washington Post, satellite images show that construction is underway at the Natanz Nuclear Facility. Also, the International Atomic Energy Agency has announced that Iran is building an advanced centrifuge assembly plant in the underground of Natanz Nuclear Facility.

The Natanz facility was targeted by Israeli strikes in June 2025. An Israeli official claimed the facility was destroyed. According to IAEA chief Rafael Grossi, the above ground enrichment facility was completely destroyed. On 2 March 2026, the facility was again bombed by the United States, with its entrance buildings suffering significant damage. While the underground facility remains intact, the significant damage to the entrance buildings which was sustained in these bombings also made it now no longer able to be accessible. On 21 March 2026, the U.S. carried out strikes again on the facility.

=== Kuh-e Kolang Gaz La ("Pickaxe Mountain") ===
According to an analysis of satellite images by the Washington Post, after the American strike, Iran began accelerating construction on the underground site of Kuh-e Kolang Gaz La ("Pickaxe Mountain") tunneled into the Zagros mountain range approximately one mile to the south of the Natanz nuclear facility. Work on the site began in 2020. As of September 2025, international inspectors had not been given access. According to analysts who monitor the site's development, its depth may exceed that of the Natanz Site, at 260–330 feet, and is potentially intended for the secure storage of Iran's stockpile of near-weapons-grade uranium or for covert uranium enrichment. The site's footprint aboveground covers an area of approximately one square mile, and features two pairs of entrance tunnels, one to the east and one to the west. Satellite images reveal major changes made to the site between 30 June and 18 September 2025: construction of a 4000 foot security wall which completed the enclosure, reinforcement of one of the tunnel entrances, increased piles of excavated spoil indicating underground expansion, as well as the grading of the road parallel to the perimeter.

== Parchin ==
Parchin Military Complex (35.52°N 51.77°E) is located approximately 20 kilometers southeast of downtown Tehran. According to BBC Parchin "is dedicated to the research, development and production of ammunition, rockets and explosives", though other reports suggest that it is also used for the development of Iran's nuclear arsenal.

In 2004, the construction of a large explosives containment vessel raised suspicions regarding Parchin's role in Iran's nuclear programme. The IAEA was initially given access to Parchin on 1 November 2005, and it took environmental samples: inspectors did not observe any unusual activities in the buildings visited at the time, and the results of the analysis of environmental samples did not indicate the presence of nuclear material. Iran presented Parchin as a facility for the testing and manufacturing of conventional explosives, though doubt would eventually be cast on this claim; IAEA safeguards inspectors were looking not for evidence of nuclear material, but of the kind of explosives testing consistent with nuclear weapons research and development.

In November 2011, IAEA officials identified a "large explosive containment vessel" inside Parchin and reported that they had "credible" information that Parchin was used for implosion testing, stating that Iran had been conducting experiments to develop nuclear weapons there. In February 2012 the IAEA sought additional access to Parchin, which Iran did not grant.

In early September 2012, in a briefing to the Board of Governors on this report, IAEA Deputy Director General Herman Nackaerts and Assistant Director General Rafael Grossi displayed satellite images for its member states which allegedly demonstrate Iranian efforts to remove incriminating evidence from its facility at Parchin, or a "nuclear clean-up." These images showed a building at Parchin covered in what appeared to be a pink tarpaulin, as well as demolition of building and removal of earth that the IAEA said would "significantly hamper" its investigation. A senior Western diplomat described the presentation as "pretty compelling." The Institute for Science and International Security (ISIS) said that the purpose of the pink tarpaulin could be to hide further "clean-up work" from satellites.

The November 2012 IAEA report noted that Iran had continued to deny the IAEA access to the military site at Parchin. Citing evidence from satellite imagery that "Iran constructed a large explosives containment vessel in which to conduct hydrodynamic experiments" relevant to nuclear weapons development, the report expresses concern that changes taking place at the Parchin military site might eliminate evidence of past nuclear activities. Further changes to the Parchin military site, indicative of continued nuclear activity, were documented By the IAEA February 2013 report.

In June 2016, despite Iranian denial of nuclear activity in Parchin the previous year, IAEA investigators reported to the Wall Street Journal that in December 2015 they had found traces of uranium at the Parchin facility, establishing the first physical evidence of a nuclear weapons programme at the missile complex site. Based on intelligence about activity in the Parchin military complex in 2024, it was assessed that Iran had resumed its pursuit of nuclear weapons. This activity included including computer modeling, metallurgy, and explosive research, the combination and nature of which cannot be explained plausibly unless they were used to develop Iran's nuclear arsenal. In October 2024, Taleghan 2, a highly classified nuclear weapons research facility, located within the Parchin Military Complex in Iran, was destroyed in an airstrike conducted by the IDF. The facility was reportedly operational at the time of the attack.

== Saghand ==
Saghand is Iran's first uranium ore mine that became operational in March 2005. It is located at 32.313°N 55.530°E. The deposit is estimated to contain 3,000 to 5,000 tons of uranium oxide at a density of about 500 ppm over an area of 100 to 150 square kilometers.

== Tehran Nuclear Research Center ==
The Tehran Nuclear Research Center (TNRC) brings together a number of Iranian nuclear research facilities, including the Jabr Ibn Hayan Multipurpose Laboratories, the Molybdenum, Iodine, and Xenon (MIX) Radioisotope Production Facility, the Radiochemistry Laboratories, and the Tehran Research Reactor (TRR). The TNRC has been the site of multiple undeclared nuclear activities, encompassing plutonium separation and purification, uranium conversion, laser enrichment, and polonium production.

These activities, many of which have direct applications in nuclear weapons development, have drawn international scrutiny, particularly due to Iran’s failure to disclose them fully to the International Atomic Energy Agency (IAEA). The presence of advanced research infrastructure within the TNRC has further raised concerns about Iran’s nuclear intentions, as the facility’s capabilities extend beyond civilian applications and into sensitive areas relevant to weapons proliferation.

=== Tehran Research Reactor ===
The Tehran Research Reactor (TRR) 35°44′18″N 51°23′17″E was a focal point in the negotiations leading to the 2015 Joint Comprehensive Plan of Action (JCPOA) due to its dual-use potential. While the reactor was primarily designated for medical isotope production, its capability to operate with highly enriched uranium (HEU) raised concerns about its possible military applications. The facility’s ability to produce materials relevant to nuclear weapons development made it a subject of international scrutiny and regulatory measures within the framework of the nuclear agreement.

The reactor was supplied by the United States under the Atoms for Peace program. The 5-megawatt pool-type nuclear research reactor became operational in 1967 and initially used highly enriched uranium fuel. Light water is used as moderator, coolant and shielding. The TRR core lattice is a 9×6 array containing Standard Fuel Elements (SFEs), Control Fuel Elements (CFEs), irradiation boxes (as vertical tubes provided within the core lattice configuration for long term irradiation of samples and radioisotope production) and graphite boxes (as reflectors).

After the Iranian Revolution, the United States cut off the supply of highly enriched uranium (HEU) fuel for the TRR, which forced the reactor to be shut down for a number of years. Due to the nuclear proliferation concerns caused by the use of HEUs and following Reduced Enrichment Research and Test Reactor (RERTR) Programs, Iran signed agreements with Argentina's National Atomic Energy Commission to convert the TRR from highly enriched uranium fuel to low-enriched uranium, and to supply the low-enriched uranium to Iran in 1987–88. TRR core was converted to use Low Enriched Uranium (LEU) fuels in 1993.

On the other hand, during the same time period, between 1988 and 1993, Iran conducted undeclared experiments in uranium reprocessing at the TRR, and between 1991-1993 separated approximately 100 milligrams of plutonium, an amount 500 times higher than the 200 micrograms which it declared. Additionally, Iran attempted to extract the Polonium-210 isotope by irradiating two bismuth targets, which together with beryllium serves as a neutron initiator in a number of nuclear weapon designs. Although Iran stated that these actions were experiments for the feasibility of radioisotope thermoelectric generator production, the IAEA expressed doubt regarding Iran's declared intentions.

Fuel elements of TRR are now plate-type U_{3}O_{8}-Al with approximately 20% enrichment. In February 2012, Iran loaded the first domestically produced fuel element into the Tehran Research Reactor.

Standard fuel elements of TRR have 19 fuel plates, while CFEs have only 14 fuel plates to accommodate the fork-type control rods. Control of the reactor is accomplished by the insertion or removal of safety and regulating absorber plates, which contain Ag–In–Cd alloy and stainless steel, respectively. The negative temperature coefficient of reactivity of the system provides additional passive nuclear safety.

The reactor core is immersed in either section of a two-section, concrete pool filled with water. One of the sections of the pool contains an experimental stall into which beam tubes and other experimental facilities converge. The other section is an open area for bulk irradiation studies. The reactor can be operated in either section.

The reactor experimental facilities in the stall end are as follow:

1. Two pneumatic rabbit tubes (for short term irradiation of samples)
2. One graphite thermal column
3. One 12"×12" beam tube
4. Four 6" diameter beam tubes
5. One 8" diameter beam tube
6. One 6" diameter through tube

TRR core cooling is accomplished by gravity flow of pool water at nominal rate of 500 m^{3}/hr through the reactor core, grid plate, plenum and into the hold-up tank from where it is pumped through the shell of the heat exchanger and then back into the pool.

== Yazd ==
Yazd Radiation Processing Center, established in 1998 by AEOI, is equipped with a Rhodotron TT200 accelerator, made by IBA, Belgium, with outputs of 5 and 10MeV beam lines and a maximum power of 100 kW. As of 2006 the centre is engaged in geophysical research to analyze the mineral deposits surrounding the city and was expected to play an important role in supporting the medical and polymer industries.

In 2016, an AEOI spokesman stated that AEOI plans to build at least 10 multipurpose gamma irradiation plants for radiation sterilization of disposable medical products, and that Iran needs five electron beam accelerators for wastewater treatment and 10 for material modification.

== See also ==
- Iranian underground missile bases
