= Mohsen Fakhrizadeh =

Iranian nuclear physicist (1961–2020)

Sardar Mohsen Fakhrizadeh
- محسن فخری‌زاده
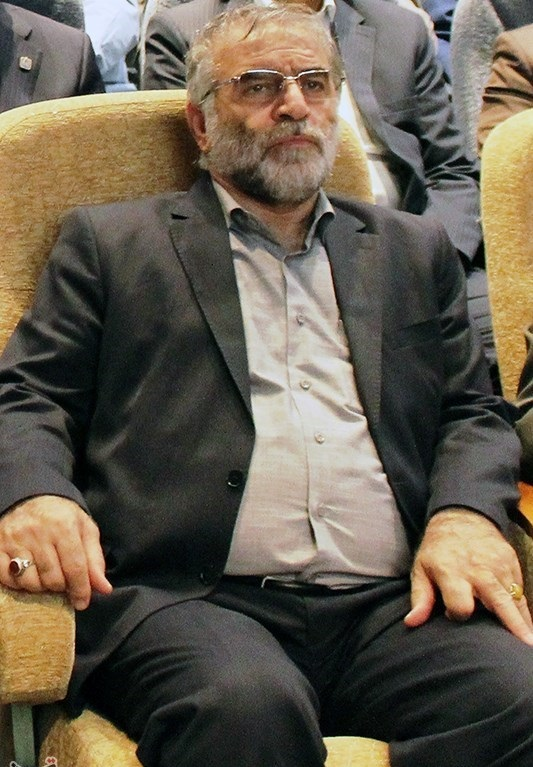
- Fakhrizadeh in an undated photo
- Born: Mohsen Fakhrizadeh Mahabadi محسن فخری‌زاده مهابادی; 21 March 1961; Qom, Pahlavi Iran
- Died: 27 November 2020 (aged 59); Absard, Damavand, Iran
- Cause of death: Gunshot wounds
- Education: Shahid Beheshti University; Isfahan University of Technology
- Occupation: Nuclear physicist
- Employers: Imam Hossein University; Ministry of Defence (SPND)
- Spouse: Sediqeh Qasemi
- Children: 3
- Awards: Order of Service (2nd order); Order of Nasr (1st order)
- Military career
- Allegiance: Iran
- Branch: Islamic Revolutionary Guard Corps
- Service years: c. 1979–2020
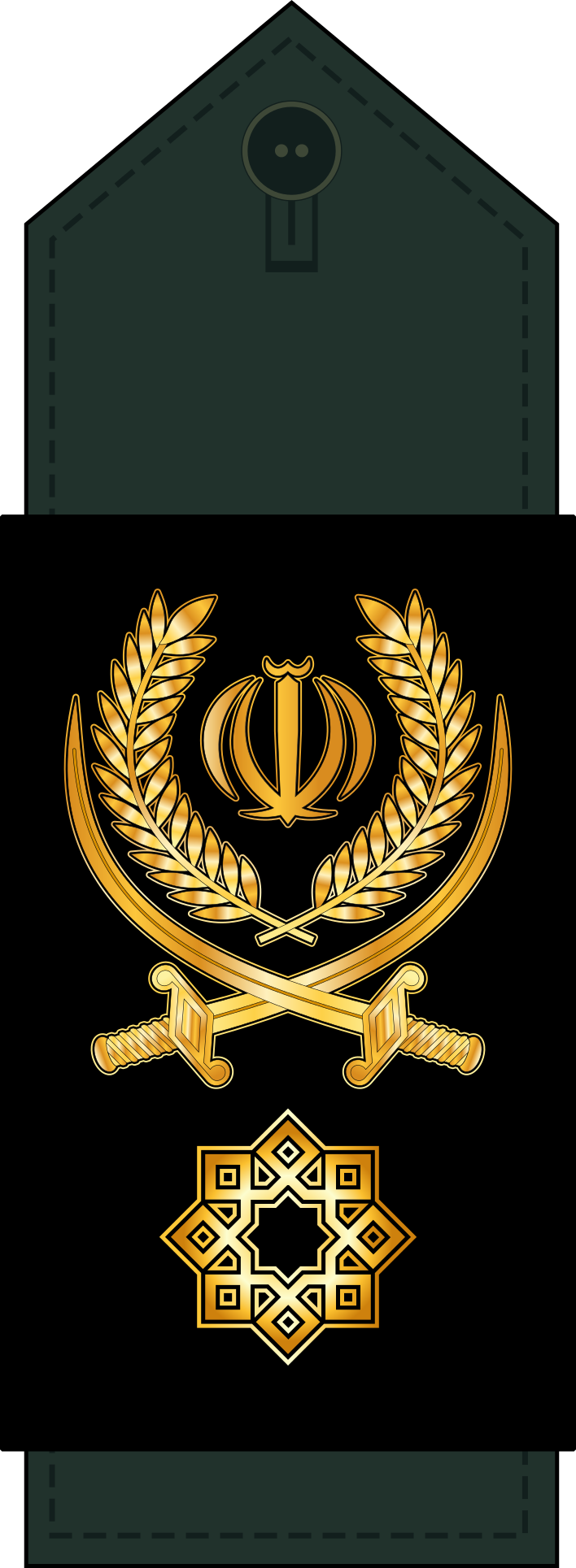
- Rank: Brigadier General

Mohsen Fakhrizadeh Mahabadi (Persian: محسن فخری‌زاده مهابادی; 21 March 1961 – 27 November 2020) was an Iranian nuclear physicist and scientist. He was regarded as the chief of Iran's nuclear program.

Born in Qom in 21 March 1961, Fakhrizadeh joined the Islamic Revolutionary Guard Corps after the Iranian Revolution of 1979. He attended Shahid Beheshti University and later received a PhD from the University of Isfahan. Beginning in 1991, he was a physics professor at Imam Hossein University.

Fakhrizadeh led the Organization of Defensive Innovation and Research and the Green Salt Project. Due to Fakhrizadeh's affiliation with the Iranian nuclear program, both the United Nations Security Council and the United States ordered his assets frozen in the mid-2000s. In the early 2010s, he established and led the Organization of Defensive Innovation and Research, which, according to the United States, conducted research potentially useful for nuclear weapons. Iran has denied that its nuclear programme has a military aspect. In 2018, Israeli prime minister Benjamin Netanyahu said that Fakhrizadeh was the head of the AMAD Project. Following his death, the Iranian government said that in 2020, he helped develop COVID-19 testing kits and a vaccine for use during the pandemic.

On 27 November 2020, the Israeli government assassinated Fakhrizadeh in a road ambush in Absard using an autonomous satellite-operated gun. In a June 2021 television interview, former Mossad chief Yossi Cohen offered Israel's closest admission yet of its responsibility for the assassination. The Iranian government labelled the killing of the scientist an act of "state terror". The killing raised tensions in the region and the Iranian legislature passed a bill to block inspections of its nuclear program.

== Early life ==
Fakhrizadeh was born in a conservative family in Qom in 1961. He became a member of the Islamic Revolutionary Guard Corps (IRGC) after the Iranian revolution in 1979.

== Career ==
=== Academic career (1991–2020) ===
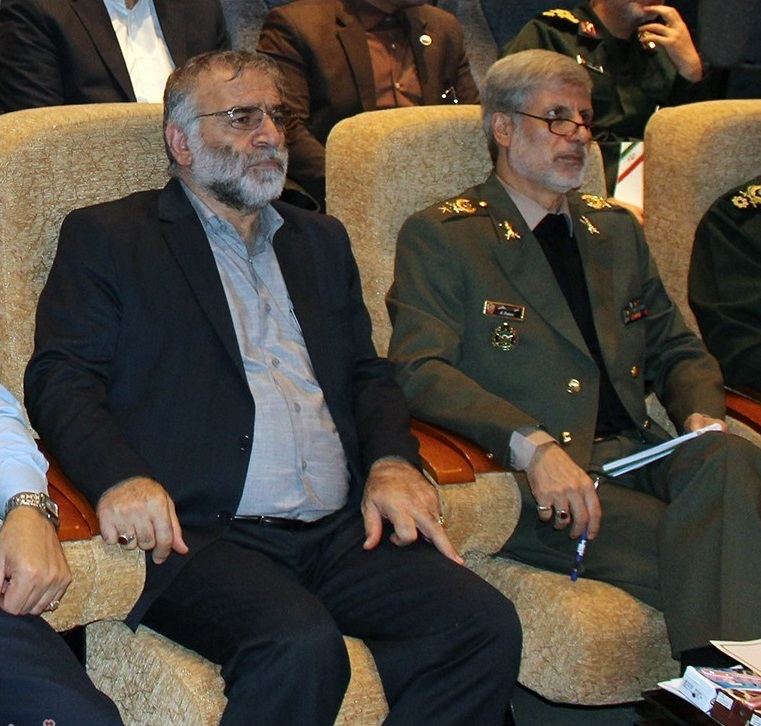
With Amir Hatami, Minister of Defense of Islamic Republic of Iran

Fakhrizadeh received his B.Sc in nuclear physics from Shahid Beheshti University in 1987. He continued his education at the Isfahan University of Technology and received a PhD in nuclear radiation and cosmic rays.

According to Alireza Jafarzadeh, Fakhrizadeh was a member of the Imam Hossein University (IHU) faculty beginning in 1991. At IHU, located in Tehran, he taught physics. According to a 2007 CIA assessment conducted under President of the United States George W. Bush, Fakhrizadeh's academic position was a "cover story".

In the early 2000s, Fakhrizadeh led an initiative called the Biological Study Centre, described as a successor to the Physics Research Centre (PHRC). The activities of this research group took place at Lavizan-Shian.

In 2020, following his death, Fakhrizadeh was said (by the Iranian government) to have been a key figure in the fight against the COVID-19 pandemic, which hit Iran particularly hard (COVID-19 pandemic in Iran). According to Majid Takht-Ravanchi, Iran's ambassador to the United Nations, Fakhrizadeh led the team that developed the first Iranian COVID-19 tests. Iran's Defense Minister Amir Hatami reported that Fakhrizadeh had taken "great strides in the field of developing COVID-19 vaccine", later named FAKHRAVAC. He added that the center led by Fakhrizadeh went through the first phase of clinical human trials and "did great things for our dear people".

On 29 November 2020, the head of the Coronavirus Battle Headquarters of Tehran paid tribute to Fakhrizadeh as a prominent scientist and distinguished scholar in research, technology and the health sector.

=== United Nations sanctions (2006–2007) ===
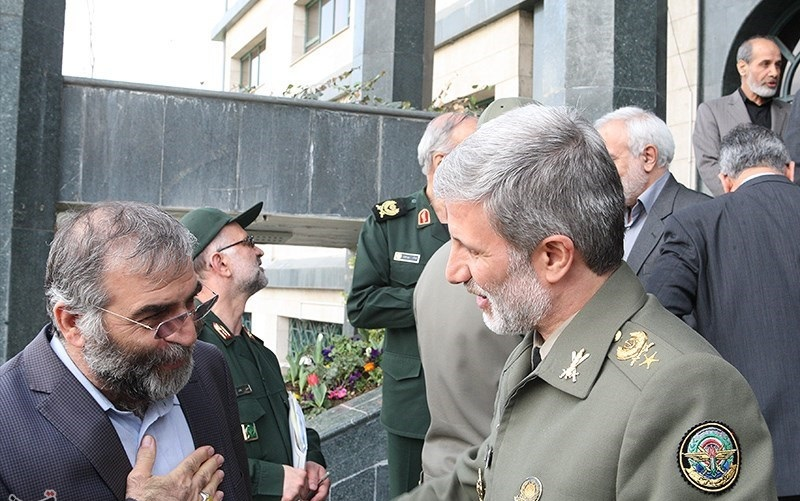
Fakhrizadeh (far left) speaking with minister of defense Brigadier Hatami

As of 2006–07, Fakhrizadeh was subject to a United Nations Security Council asset freeze and travel notification requirements because the Council said the International Atomic Energy Agency (IAEA) had asked to interview Fakhrizadeh and Iran refused to make him available. Iran has provided some information regarding Fakhrizadeh's work which the IAEA says is "not inconsistent with its findings", but the IAEA continues to seek corroboration of its findings. According to the UN designation, Fakhrizadeh was a senior Ministry of Defence and Armed Forces Logistics scientist and former head of the Physics Research Center (PHRC). The IAEA asked to interview him about the activities of the PHRC over the period he was head, but Iran denied the request. Fakhrizadeh was identified as a "key figure" in a 2007 report by the UN on Iran's nuclear programme.

A 2007 UN Security Council resolution identified Fakhrizadeh as a senior scientist in the Ministry of Defence and Armed Forces Logistics and the former head of the Physics Research Center (PHRC) at Lavizan-Shian.

In 2008, the United States ordered his assets frozen, along with those of other Iranian officials.

=== Organization of Defensive Innovation and Research (2011–2020) ===
After the AMAD Project was discontinued, Fakhrizadeh established and led the Organization of Defensive Innovation and Research (SPND), a government-funded entity alleged by the US State department to be working on "dual-use research and development activities, of which aspects are potentially useful for nuclear weapons and nuclear weapons delivery systems." Transliterated Sazman-e Pazhohesh va Noavarihaye Defaee, SPND was founded in February 2011 and headquartered within Iran's Ministry of Defence and Armed Forces Logistics. Fakhrizadeh was SPND's director between 2008 and 2011. SPND was affiliated with Malek-Ashtar University of Technology.

SPND is a subordinated organization of Ministry of Defence and Armed Forces Logistics.

=== Nuclear weapons programme (2007–2020) ===
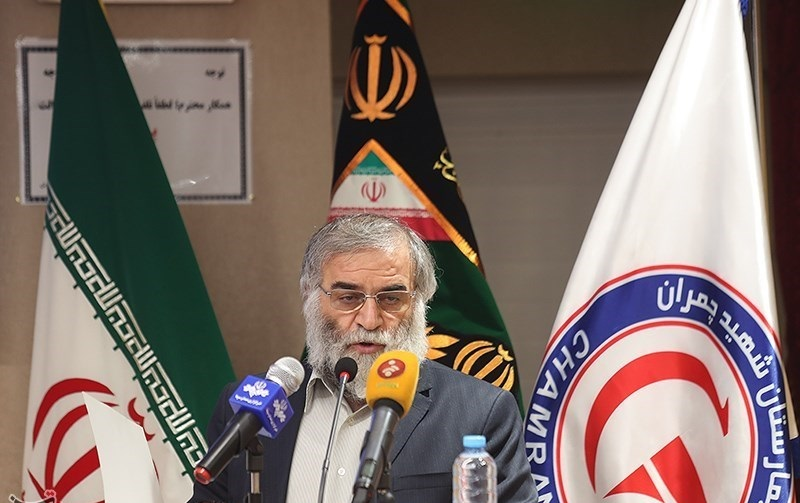
Fakhrizadeh speaking

An internal 2007 Iranian document leaked to The Sunday Times identified Fakhrizadeh as the chairman of the Field for the Expansion of Deployment of Advanced Technology (FEDAT), the cover name for the organization running Iran's nuclear weapons programme. The document, entitled Outlook for Special Neutron-Related Activities over the Next Four Years, lays out a four-year plan to develop a uranium deuteride neutron initiator.

As a key figure in the Physics Research Center, Fakhrizadeh was responsible for planning and acquiring parts for Iran's first uranium enrichment plant. In 2010, The Guardian reported that Fakhrizadeh was believed to be in charge of Iran's nuclear programme.

In 2012, The Wall Street Journal called him "Tehran's atomic weapons guru"; in 2014, The New York Times called him "the closest thing to an Iranian Oppenheimer". Following Fakhrizadeh's assassination, Ayatollah Ali Khamenei described him as "the country's prominent and distinguished nuclear and defensive scientist". Western intelligence agencies, including those of the United States, alleged that Fakhrizadeh was in charge of Iran's nuclear programme, Project 111, which they contend is or was an attempt to create a nuclear bomb for Iran; Iran has denied that its nuclear programme has a military aspect. Fakhrizadeh was referred to as the director of the Green Salt Project.

According to The New York Times, Fakhrizadeh was described in classified portions of American intelligence reports as deeply involved in an effort to design a nuclear warhead for Iran.

A June 2020 U.S. Department of State report stated that former contributors to Iran's nuclear weapons program continued to work on "weaponization-relevant dual-use technical activities" under Fakhrizadeh.

In November 2021, Fereydoon Abbasi, former head of the Atomic Energy Organization of Iran, hinted that Fakhrizadeh had worked on a nuclear weapons program, despite Khamenei's fatwa against nuclear weapons.

=== Role in the JCPOA ===
About one year after the Joint Comprehensive Plan of Action (JCPOA) agreement, also known as the Iran nuclear deal, during a ceremony in the IRIB International Conference Center on 8 February 2016, Hassan Rouhani awarded medals and orders to its nuclear negotiators and other key figures who helped to finalize the deal. Mohammad Javad Zarif, Hossein Dehghan, Ali Akbar Salehi were some of the names that were published by news agencies. Mohsen Fakhrizadeh was one of the notables who received an Order of Service by Hassan Rouhani as well. But, this was classified until after his assassination.

Fakhrizadeh reportedly questioned the efficacy of the deal, saying "America can't be compromised with".

== Personal life ==
Fakhrizadeh was married and had children. He had his own security detail and lived in a secure compound. Fakhrizadeh had reportedly escaped an assassination attempt in the past.

Despite his high status, Fakhrizadeh maintained a low public profile. He was rarely mentioned in Iranian state media and was typically referred to as a university professor. This secrecy recently slipped when he appeared on Iranian websites with Ayatollah Ali Khamenei.

In a 2018 televised presentation, Israeli Prime Minister Benjamin Netanyahu singled out Fakhrizadeh. Relying on alleged Iranian documents obtained by Mossad, Netanyahu labelled Fakhrizadeh as the head of the AMAD Project. He then urged his audience to "remember his [Fakhrizadeh's] name".

== Assassination ==
Assassination of Mohsen Fakhrizadeh
- Part of Assassinations of Iranian nuclear scientists
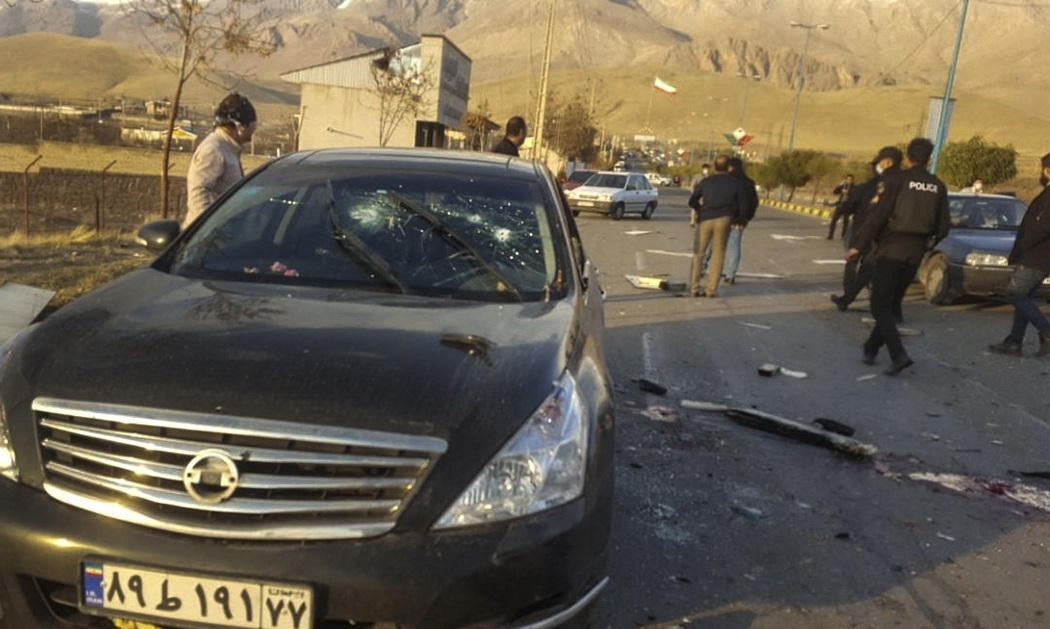
- Aftermath of the attack
- Location: 35°39′0.04″N 52°10′2.89″E; Absard, Damavand, Iran
- Date: 27 November 2020
- Target: Mohsen Fakhrizadeh
- Attack type: Political assassination
- Weapons: Firearm car bomb
- Deaths: 1–4
- Injuries: Unknown
- Perpetrator: Israel (alleged)

=== Prelude ===
The Israeli government's foreign intelligence agency, Mossad, since 2007 has assassinated five Iranian scientists and wounded an additional one, using a variety of methods, including poisoning, remotely-detonated bombs, and motorcyclists shooting at the car of the targets. Israel had been seeking ways to assassinate Fakhrizadeh for years, and the effort resumed when U.S. president Donald Trump in May 2018 abrogated the Iran nuclear deal.

Fakhrizadeh's security team advised him against traveling on 27 November 2020 due to a higher level of risk that day. According to one of his sons, "[Fakhrizadeh] refused because he had an important meeting, and he was supposed to lecture to students. He insisted on returning to Tehran the same day."

Ali Shamkhani, Secretary of Iran's Supreme National Security Council, revealed that the Iranians did have an intelligence report predicting the assassination. However, it was ignored due to the frequency of assassination warnings. The BBC labelled this and the later discrepancies between accounts a "massive failure of counter-intelligence for Iran's security chiefs".

The year prior to Fakrizadeh's death saw escalating tensions between Iran and the United States and its allies. His death followed the assassination of Qasem Soleimani by the U.S. in January 2020 and the 2020 Iran explosions. The limited retaliation by the Iranian government to such incidents may have emboldened the Israeli effort to kill Fakhrizadeh.

=== Ambush attack ===
On 27 November 2020, Fakhrizadeh was ambushed while traveling in a black Nissan Teana (pictured) on a rural road in Absard, a city near Tehran. He had been traveling between Tehran and his weekend villa: the area around Absard is filled with vacation villas. On that particular day, the roads were emptier than normal due to a COVID-19 pandemic lockdown, giving the attackers an opportunity to strike with fewer people in the area. Accompanied by a convoy of three armored vehicles, he was driving with his wife in an armored car. The convoy carried eleven bodyguards. Many reports of the incident are conflicting and there are multiple competing narratives.

Initial accounts described a Nissan truck, carrying explosives hidden beneath a load of wood, that detonated near Fakhrizadeh's car. (Note: The explosion damaged electricity poles and transmitters and hurled debris over 300 metres (980 ft).) According to Iranian authorities, gunmen then emerged and fired upon Fakhrizadeh's car. In response, Fakhrizadeh's bodyguards clashed with the assailants. In the gunfight, three bodyguards were killed and others were wounded. Iranian sources reported that three to four of the attackers were killed. This account was partly corroborated by witnesses who spoke to state media. There were also reports of a suicide attacker who later died from his injuries.

Later, a contradictory account emerged, when the Fars News Agency reported that no gunmen were present, and that only a remote-controlled machine gun mounted on a Nissan was used in the attack. IRGC Deputy Commander-In-Chief Ali Fadavi said that the weapon was autonomous, i.e. that it was equipped with a camera and used artificial intelligence and facial recognition to target Fakhrizadeh. In this account, Fakhrizadeh, possibly not recognizing gunfire, exited his vehicle after he believed it struck something. The automatic gun "controlled by satellite" then struck him thirteen times from a distance of 150 metres (490 ft). According to Fadavi, who stated that Fakhrizadeh actually remained seated in his car, the gun was so accurate that not a single bullet struck his wife, who was seated next to him. According to the Mehr News Agency, the head of the security detail was shot four times after he threw himself over Fakhrizadeh. Soon after, the Nissan truck carrying the gun detonated. (Note: The Associated Press suggested that the truck was blown up to destroy evidence of the satellite-operated gun technology.) The entire attack lasted three minutes. This account was corroborated by Ali Shamkhani of Iran's Supreme National Security Council.

Security and intelligence experts have questioned this account, explaining that remote-controlled technology would have introduced unnecessary risk factors for the culprits. Such technology would be difficult to smuggle into the country, and in the case of failure, would leave valuable technology behind for the Iranians to capture and analyze. Critics have suggested that this account was an excuse after Iranian authorities failed to capture the culprits.

Aside from the plausibility of remote technology and artificial intelligence being used in the assassination, others questioned whether such use was ethical. Noel Sharkey, a professor and member of the Campaign Against Killer Robots, expressed concern over the possible use of AI in the assassination, noting that it could have "unimaginable consequences" and cause a "downhill roll that would entirely disrupt global security". A U.S. based research group has questioned the use of either AI or a robot gun analysis presented in both the Iranian account, and the New York Times reporting on the operation and assassination. An open-source intelligence analyst used a three-dimensional modeling which found that the bullet trajectories originated from the same point, supporting the Iranian account.

In February 2021, The Jewish Chronicle released a detailed account of the assassination citing "intelligence sources". According to the Jewish Chronicle, Fakhrizadeh was assassinated by the Mossad with no US involvement, and Israel had only given the US minimal prior warning. The report confirmed the Iranian claim of an automated machine gun being used, claiming that Fakhrizadeh was killed by a remotely-operated one-ton automated gun that had been smuggled into Iran piece by piece before being assembled, and which included a bomb so that it could self-destruct, though contrary to Iranian claims it was not satellite-operated. According to the report, more than 20 people were involved in the assassination, including both Israeli and Iranian nationals. Preparations for the assassination had allegedly commenced in March 2020, when Israeli spies were dispatched to Iran and liaised with local agents. The group had Fakhrizadeh under intense surveillance for eight months, and after his routine had been learned, the decision was made to kill him on the road leading east out of Tehran to Absard, where he had a villa to which he travelled on Fridays. According to the report, Fakhrizadeh's convoy was watched from a distance by a team of Israeli agents who activated the gun when his car passed the designated spot. The automated machine gun, which was mounted on the back of a Nissan pickup truck parked on the side of the road, opened fire, killing Fakhrizadeh. No one else was harmed in the assassination. As the Mossad team made its escape, the gun exploded, adding to the confusion at the scene.

In September 2021, The New York Times published an in-depth report of the assassination, stating that it was based on interviews with Israeli, Iranian, and American intelligence officials. According to the account, Israel had been monitoring Fakhrizadeh since 2007 and the Mossad had originally planned to assassinate him in 2009, but the operation was called off for fear of an ambush. Preparations for the assassination began in late 2019 or early 2020. The assassination was allegedly motivated by two factors: Iran's tepid retaliation to the assassination of Qasem Soleimani in January 2020, and the rising likelihood that Donald Trump was going to lose the 2020 United States presidential election to Joe Biden, who had indicated that he would try to return to the JCPOA deal. The assassination was carried out with a modified FN MAG machine gun attached to a robotic apparatus. The entire device weighed about one ton and was smuggled to Iran in pieces and reassembled. As per the report, the gun was put in place by Iranians working for the Mossad, at a junction on the main road to Absard, on a truck which also had a camera and a bomb so that it could be destroyed after the operation. The gun was controlled by a Mossad team operating from a command center outside Iran. Artificial intelligence was used to compensate for the slight time delay the operators had to deal with thousands of miles away, as well as the speed of Fakhrizadeh's vehicle, and the recoil of the gun that could possibly change the trajectory. As Fakhrizadeh's motorcade arrived at the junction, another vehicle which contained bodyguards rushed ahead toward his villa so they could inspect it before his arrival, leaving him exposed. When the convoy slowed for a speed bump in front of the truck, the Mossad team identified Fakhrizadeh and opened fire on his car, causing it to swerve and stop. Fakhrizadeh stepped out and crouched before the open door. He was then hit three times. The gun had fired 15 bullets. The truck then exploded, but most of the equipment remained intact, albeit severely damaged.

==== Aftermath ====
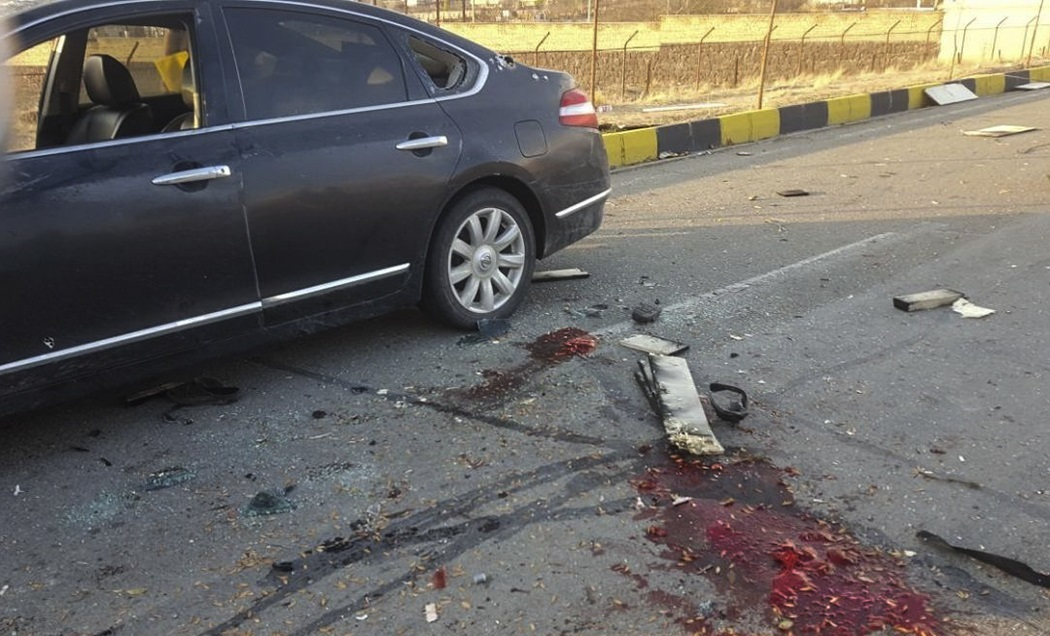
Blood stains following the attack

Fakhrizadeh was reportedly hit in the back by a bullet, injuring his spinal cord. According to an interview his sons gave to Iranian state media, Fakhrizadeh was hit with a total of four or five shots. IRGC Deputy Commander-in-Chief Ali Fadavi and the Jewish Chronicle report both claimed that Fakhrizadeh was hit by 13 rounds. Airlifted in a police helicopter, he was then taken to a hospital, where he died after efforts to resuscitate him failed.

After the incident, Iranian security forces began stopping vehicles in Tehran in a search for the culprits. No group claimed responsibility for his killing. On 8 December, Iranian authorities arrested several individuals in relation to the attack. They have yet to provide details about whom they arrested. On 9 February 2021, Iranian Intelligence Minister Mahmoud Alavi stated that a member of the armed forces was suspected of involvement in the assassination. The Iranian armed forces subsequently denied that the person in question had been a soldier, claiming that he had been a trainee who was dismissed due to "moral issues and addiction" before being officially inducted, and thus as a civilian, it had been the Intelligence Ministry's job to monitor him.

As Fakhrizadeh had been one of the most highly protected people in Iran, his successful assassination and the subsequent failure of the Iranian authorities to capture the assassins was seen as a major failure for Iran's security apparatus. Many Iranians on social media criticized the Iranian security services for carrying out brutal internal repression against Iranian dissidents, while simultaneously being unable to prevent the assassination of one of the country's leading nuclear scientists, and also mocked the claim of a robotic machine gun having been used. Different arms of Iran's security apparatus traded blame over the failure to protect Fakhrizadeh.

=== Response ===
==== Internal ====
Iran's Supreme National Security Council reportedly convened an emergency meeting attended by senior military commanders. Hossein Salami, the chief commander of Islamic Revolutionary Guard Corps (IRGC), called for revenge and punishment for the perpetrators of the assassination. Ali Khamenei, the supreme leader of Iran, also called for the punishment of the perpetrators and commanders of the terrorist act; his international affairs adviser Ali Akbar Velayati called Mohsen Fakhrizadeh a "great martyr" and called for revenge. Iranian officials stated that Fakhrizadeh would receive "the burial of a national hero at one of the country's holiest shrines". Iran called on the United Nations Security Council (UNSC) to speak out against the killing and take action against its perpetrators, but the UNSC has yet to release a statement. Iran's foreign minister called the United States-supported Israel assassination of the scientist an act of "state terror."

==== External ====
Former CIA director John Brennan called the killing "criminal" and "highly reckless". The foreign ministers of Pakistan, Qatar, Turkey, the United Arab Emirates, and Iraq, as well as the defence minister of Azerbaijan condemned the killing.

A spokesman for UN secretary-general António Guterres called for restraint to avoid possible conflicts. The Federal Foreign Office, Germany's foreign ministry, stated that "all parties" involved in the incident should avoid "escalation", suggesting that any further steps by the United States or Iran could imperil future international talks about Iran's nuclear programme.

Although the United States did not make an official statement on the killing, President Donald Trump retweeted Israeli journalist Yossi Melman's account of the incident, which called it a "major psychological and professional blow for Iran". Similarly, Michael P. Mulroy, the Pentagon's former top Middle East policy official, called the assassination "a setback to Iran's nuclear program".

Iran's UN ambassador Majid Takht-Ravanchi confirmed Fakhrizadeh's key-role in COVID-19 research. Ravanchi reiterated that "the terror attack was aimed at disrupting scientific and technological development in Iran" while its people struggle under sanctions, COVID-19 and a plunging economy. A different opinion was also made public, when on 7 December 2020, an Israeli flag was hung over a pedestrian bridge in Tehran, along with a sign that read "Thank you Mossad". The display was widely shared across social media in Iran and outside.

==== Alleged Israeli involvement ====
Iranian officials blamed primarily Israel for the assassination, as well as the United States and the MEK. Hezbollah also criticized the killing and alleged US and Israeli involvement. Mohammad Javad Zarif, Iran's foreign minister, tweeted: "Terrorists murdered an eminent Iranian scientist today. This cowardice—with serious indications of Israeli role—shows desperate warmongering of perpetrators. Iran calls on the international community—and especially EU to end their shameful double standards & condemn this act of state terror." In June 2021, Yossi Cohen, former head of Mossad, is said to have admitted Israel was behind the assassination off record, during an interview for Israeli television. According to Iranian state television, a weapon recovered from the scene carried "the logo and specifications of the Israeli military industry".

Some Iranian hardliners used Fakhrizadeh's assassination to criticise President Hassan Rohani and his government, claiming that officials had allowed the UN nuclear watchdog, the IAEA, access to Fakhrizadeh. Soon after the attack, spokesman Ali Rabii defended the Intelligence Ministry, saying it had already given security agencies information about the target and the likely location. He added that the killing could have been avoided if proper security measures had been followed.

Trita Parsi, the founder of the National Iranian American Council, labelled Israel the "prime suspect". Mark Dubowitz, the chief executive of Foundation for Defense of Democracies, stated that the ambush "certainly has the hallmarks of an Israeli operation". According to The New York Times, Fakhrizadeh was the number one target of Israeli intelligence agency Mossad, which was alleged to have been involved in the assassination of Iranian nuclear scientists, some of whom were Fakhrizadeh's deputies, in the 2010s. An American official and two other intelligence officials claimed Israel was behind the killing. However, Tzachi Hanegbi, an Israeli cabinet minister and close confidant of Benjamin Netanyahu, stated that he did not know who killed Fakhrizadeh. Israel has not confirmed or denied the allegations.

Some Western intelligence sources, including from US intelligence, speaking anonymously to the media also claimed that Israel was behind the attack. An unnamed Western intelligence source told Israel's Channel 12 that the assassination was the pinnacle of Israel's long-term plans. Speaking anonymously to The New York Times, an anonymous Israeli official who was reportedly involved in tracking Fakhrizadeh for years also claimed Israel was responsible for the assassination and said that the world should thank Israel for carrying it out. Former CIA official and security analyst Bruce Riedel likewise attributed the attack to Israeli intelligence and said that Israel was showing extraordinary and unprecedented levels of ability in striking at key individuals in enemy territory.

Amos Yadlin, head of the Institute for National Security Studies at Tel Aviv University, said that although Iranians will find a replacement for Soleimani, nobody will have the special skills to replace Fakhrizadeh at this level. Moreover, unlike Soleimani's assassination, nobody took responsibility in Fakhrizadeh's case, therefore Iran does not have to react quickly, which means they will probably wait until the end of Trump's tenure to retaliate. Yadlin considers the most dangerous option for Iran to fire ballistic missiles against Israel, while more feasible reprisals are accelerating Iran's nuclear program by enriching uranium to a higher level and installing advanced centrifuges, or attacking Israeli embassies and diplomats, along similar lines to Iran's response to the killing of its nuclear scientists between 2010 and 2012. Yadlin also criticized some reactions to Fakhrizadeh's assassination by saying "the Americans were quick to leak to The New York Times that it was done by Israel. Any more evidence which helps Iran to decide on retaliating against Israel is a mistake."

Apprehensive of retaliation, Israel placed its embassies on high alert on 28 November. Following the incident, Jewish communities in the diaspora were also placed on high alert. Israel's National Security Council urged greater vigilance for Israelis living and travelling abroad. Israeli security officials advised former nuclear scientists, who had worked at a reactor in Dimona to be cautious. Likely to deter an Iranian retaliation, Israel deployed a submarine to the Persian Gulf. That same day, the USS Georgia was sighted in the gulf, the first such Ohio-class guided-missile submarine spotted in the area in eight years.

==== Impact on Iranian policy ====
Avatar of Khamenei.ir

Khamenei.ir
(@khamenei_ir)
tweeted:

One of our country's eminent scientists in the nuclear & defense fields - Dr. Mohsen Fakhrizadeh -has been martyred by brutal mercenaries. With his great, enduring scientific efforts, he sacrificed his life on the path of God & the lofty status of martyrdom is his divine reward.

28 November 2020

In Iran, the assassination sparked "a power struggle" that set reformist political elements against hard-liners. More extreme elements demanded further breaches of the JCPOA. Some even advocated military action, such as an opinion piece published in a major Iranian newspaper that urged that if Israel indeed carried out the attack, Iran should attack the Israeli port city of Haifa so as to "cause[] heavy human casualties".

On 29 November 2020, Iran's supreme leader Ayatollah Seyyed Ali Khamenei outlined his country's response to the killing: "There are two matters that people in charge should put in their to do list: 1- To follow up the atrocity and retaliate against those who were responsible for it. 2- To follow up Martyr Fakhrizadeh's scientific and technical activities in all fields in which he was active." At a cabinet meeting, Iranian President Hassan Rouhani declared, "The think tanks and the enemies of Iran must know that the Iranian nation and the officials in charge in the country are brave and determined to respond to the murder in time." In a public lawmaking session, Iranian legislators chanted "Death to America!" and "Death to Israel!" and then reviewed a bill which would block inspections by the International Atomic Energy Agency. As an "immediate response" to the killing, the bill was approved on 1 December. Rouhani has yet to endorse the bill, rendering it null.

Reformists, however, feared that any such reaction would limit the possibility of negotiations with the United States under Biden. Hossein Dehghan, the former minister of defense of Iran, who has been sanctioned by US Department of Treasury since November 2019, warned against any American military escalation in Trump's final weeks in office. In an interview with the Associated Press, he warned that any American attack on Iran could set off a "full-fledged war" in the region.

US government officials expected a retaliation by Iran on 3 January, the first anniversary of Qasem Soleimani's assassination.

In 2023, United States Intelligence Community said in its annual threat report that since the assassination, Iran has accelerated the expansion of its nuclear program and undertaken research and development activities that would bring it closer to producing the fissile material for completing a nuclear device following a decision to do so.

==== Impact on U.S. policy ====
Some commentators believe that the killing may raise tensions in the region, and may complicate incoming US President Joe Biden's relationship with Iran. Robert Malley, who advised previous US president Barack Obama on Iran, claimed that the attack was deliberately timed in order to make Biden's attempts to negotiate with Iran more difficult. Biden had pledged to rejoin the Iranian nuclear deal. In the first European reaction to the killing, Carl Bildt, co-chair of the European Council on Foreign Relations, stated that "It's not unlikely that this targeted killing was part of efforts to prevent the Biden administration from reviving diplomacy with Iran and going back to the nuclear agreement." However, other commentators do not believe that killing will complicate Biden's relationship with Iran. Herb Keinon, a contributing editor for The Jerusalem Post asked "What would Iran stand to gain by turning a cold shoulder to Biden, especially since this did not take place under his watch?" On 3 December, Biden stated that it was "hard to tell how much" the assassination would affect the prospects of rejoining the deal.

The killing occurred two weeks after President Trump was reportedly dissuaded from striking Iran's nuclear facilities. Former head of Israeli Defence Force intelligence Amos Yadlin claimed that "With the window of time left for Trump, such a move could lead Iran to a violent response, which would provide a pretext for a US-led attack on Iranian nuclear facilities." Several hours after the killing, the Pentagon announced the return of the USS Nimitz to the region. Fearful of an attack, the United States also withdrew several staffers from its Baghdad embassy. On 9 December, the US deployed two Boeing B-52 Stratofortress bombers to the Persian Gulf. The killing has been compared to that of Qasem Soleimani, which was reciprocated by an Iranian missile attack.

The New York Times reported that: "One American official — along with two other intelligence officials — said that Israel was behind the attack on the scientist." It added that "It was unclear how much the United States may have known about the operation in advance, but the two nations are the closest of allies and have long shared intelligence regarding Iran."

==== Prosecution of Fakhrizadeh assassins through Interpol ====
According to Iran's Prosecutor General Mohammad Jafar Montazeri, Iran has sent a request to Interpol to include the Fakhrizadeh assassins in an international warrant list. Police spokesman Mahdi Hajian has confirmed that the Islamic Republic is preparing a defence list for the issuance of an Interpol red notice against the killers of Fakhrizadeh.

==== Prosecution inside Iran ====
On 25 September 2022, Tehran's chief prosecutor announced that 14 people involved in the assassination of Fakhrizadeh have been indicted and charged with "corruption on the earth," "involvement in intelligence and espionage cooperation with the Zionist regime," "collusion with the purpose of undermining the security of the country," and "action against national security".

==== Executions ====
In 2024, Iran's judiciary announced that three individuals were sentenced to death by a lower court for their involvement in the assassination of Mohsen Fakhrizadeh. Iran did not accuse the suspects of directly taking part in Fakhrizadeh's murder, but claimed they had smuggled equipment used in the assassination into the country. The three men – Edris Ali, Azad Shojaei, and Rasoul Ahmad Rasoul – were executed in 2025 during the Twelve-Day War, as part of a crackdown on suspected Israeli spies.

=== Funeral and remembrance ===
==== Remains and burial ====
Hours after his death, state media reported that his remains would be brought on a pilgrimage to Imam Reza Shrine for blessing, then to Fatima Masumeh Shrine, and then to Tehran for a visit to Mausoleum of Ruhollah Khomeini. On 30 November, Fakhrizadeh was buried during a state funeral with full military honors at Tehran's Imamzadeh Saleh. After kissing Fakhrizadeh's casket, Defense Minister General Amir Hatami declared that the assassination would make Iran "more united, more determined".

==== Protests and tributes ====
Following the killing, protests took place outside several government buildings in Tehran. US and Israeli flags and images of Trump and Biden were burned. Labeled as "hard-line" by The New York Times, protestors called for war with the United States.

Banners were also raised in his honor.

Iranian state media has announced the production of multiple teleplays about Fakhrizadeh.

== See also ==
- 2020 Iran explosions
- Assassinations of Iranian nuclear scientists
- Assassination and terrorism in Iran
- Iran and weapons of mass destruction
- Iran–Israel proxy conflict
- Israel and state-sponsored terrorism
- Dariush Rezaeinejad

== Sources ==
- Gaietta, Michele (2015). The Trajectory of Iran's Nuclear Program. New York: Palgrave Macmillan. doi:10.1057/9781137508256. ISBN 978-1-349-57841-2.
