= FAKHRAVAC =

Vaccine against COVID-19

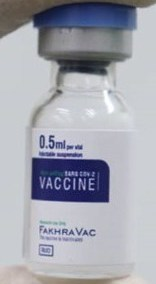
- A vial of FakhraVac

Vaccine description
- Target: SARS-CoV-2
- Vaccine type: Inactivated

Clinical data
- Other names: Fakhra, MIVAC
- Routes of administration: Intramuscular

Legal status
- Legal status: Emergency use authorization: IRN

FAKHRAVAC (Persian: واکسن فخرا) is a COVID-19 vaccine developed in Iran by the Organization of Defensive Innovation and Research, a subsidiary of Iran's Ministry of Defense. It is the third Iranian COVID-19 vaccine reaching clinical trials. It is currently in phase III. It received emergency use authorization in Iran on 9 September 2021.

The vaccine is named after the Iranian nuclear scientist Mohsen Fakhrizadeh. According to the Iranian authorities, he was working on a vaccine in response to the COVID-19 pandemic in Iran. Fakhrizadeh was assassinated in November 2020 in an attack Iran and US intelligence attributed to Israel.

== Medical uses ==
It requires two doses given by intramuscular injection 3 weeks apart.

== Pharmacology ==
FAKHRAVAC is an inactivated virus-based vaccine.

== Manufacturing ==
In August 2021, production capacity of the vaccine was reported to be 1 million dose per month and was planned to be "multiplied in a few months ". In October 2021, the production was reported to be stopped amid Iran's growing vaccine imports. In January 2022, the Director General of Health of the Ministry of Defense announced that the first shipment (around 462,000 doses) of the vaccine had been delivered to the Iranian Ministry of Health.

== Clinical trials ==
Clinical trials of FAKHRAVAC
| Phase | Registration number | Start | Number of participants | | | Age of participants |
| Phase | Registration number | Start | Total | Vaccine | Control | Age of participants |
|---|---|---|---|---|---|---|
| I | IRCT20210206050259N1 | 8 March 2021 | 135 | 96? | 39? (placebo) | 18–55 years |
| II | IRCT20210206050259N2 | 8 June 2021 | 500 | 250 | 250 (placebo) | 18–70 years |
| III | IRCT20210206050259N3 | 29 August 2021 | 41,128 | 20,564 | 20,564 (Sinopharm BIBP vaccine) | >18 years |

== Authorizations ==
FAKHRAVAC received emergency use authorization in Iran on 9 September 2021. In October 2021, Iran's Food and Drug Administration was considering giving full authorization to the vaccine for third/booster dose.

== See also ==
- Pharmaceuticals in Iran
- COVID-19 pandemic in Iran
- COVID-19 vaccine clinical research
