= SCImago Institutions Rankings =

Ranking company

- Categories: Higher education
- Frequency: Annual
- First issue: 2009
- Country: Spain
- Language: English
- Website: www.scimagoir.com

The SCImago Institutions Rankings (SIR), since 2009, has published its international ranking of worldwide research institutions, the SIR World Report. The SIR World Report is the work of the SCImago Research Group, a Spain-based research organization consist of members from the Spanish National Research Council (CSIC), University of Granada, Charles III University of Madrid, University of Alcalá, University of Extremadura, and other education institutions in Spain.

The ranking is divided into five sectors: government, health, higher education, private, and others. For each, it measures areas such as: research output, international collaboration, normalized impact, and publication rate.

== Indicators ==
Indicators are divided into three groups intended to reflect scientific, economic, and social characteristics of institutions. The SIR includes both size-dependent and size-independent indicators; that is, indicators influenced and not influenced by the size of the institutions. In this manner, the SIR provides overall statistics of the scientific publication and other output of institutions, at the same time that enables comparisons between institutions of different sizes. It needs to be kept in mind that, once the final indicator has been calculated out of the combination of the different indicators (to which a different weigh has been assigned), the resulting values have been normalized on a scale of 0 to 100.
