= Islamic World Science and Technology Citation and Monitoring Institute =

Islamic World Science and Technology Citation and Monitoring Institute (ISC)
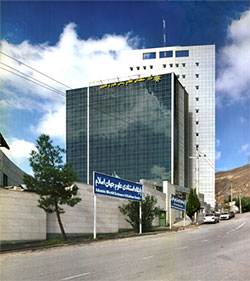
- Established: 2019
- Chancellor: Mohammad Mehdi Alavianmehr
- Location: Shiraz, Iran
- Website: Official website
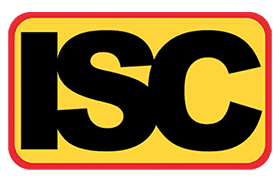

The Islamic World Science and Technology Citation and Monitoring Institute (ISC) (Persian: موسسه استنادی و پایش علم و فناوری جهان اسلام) is an information and research center in Shiraz, which is an organization that provides services related to scientific research and publication, citation indexing, and scientific evaluation to the academic community of the Islamic world among 57 Islamic countries. The institute annually announces rankings of the top universities in Iran and the Islamic world. Regional Information Center for Science and Technology began operating in 1991 after the approval of the Higher Education Development Council and the approval of the Shura Council. Islamic World Science Citation Database was launched in 2008. In 2019, With the approval of the government, this center was merged and the Islamic World Science and Technology Citation and Monitoring Institute was established.

It was announced in Baku, Azerbaijan during the Fourth Islamic Conference of the Ministers of Higher Education and Scientific Research held in October 2008. It is managed by the Islamic World Science Citation Center, located in Shiraz.

ISC's publications have been indexed in Scopus since 2009. ml It is the world's third citation database after ISI (USA) and Scopus (Netherlands).

== Cooperation between ISC and the D-8 Organization ==
The Islamic World Science and Technology Citation and Monitoring Institute (ISC) and the D-8 Organization for Economic Cooperation signed a memorandum of understanding on 13 February 2023 at the D-8 Secretariat in Istanbul, Turkey. The agreement aimed to strengthen cooperation in the fields of scientometrics, technology, and innovation. It was signed on behalf of the two institutions by Ambassador Isiaka Abdulqadir Imam, Secretary-General of the D-8 Organization, and Professor Seyed Ahmad Fazelzadeh, Head of ISC.

The memorandum aims to strengthen cooperation among scientists and research institutions in member states, improve the performance of research institutions, develop platforms for scientific collaboration, and implement joint activities to enhance engagement and visibility between the two organizations. The agreement also emphasizes expanding cooperation in scientometrics, technology, and innovation, as well as developing effective science and technology policies in member states.

According to the D-8 Organization, the 2023 memorandum replaced two previous memoranda of understanding signed between the two institutions in 2012 and 2018.

== Status in Islamic countries ==
The Islamic World Science and Technology Monitoring and Citation Institute (ISC) has connections with academic institutions and scholarly publications in several Islamic countries. These connections include the indexing of academic journals and the use of ISC databases in scholarly research.

=== Cooperation with Russia ===
The Islamic World Science and Technology Citation and Monitoring Institute (ISC) established scientific cooperation with Empress Catherine II Saint Petersburg Mining University in Russia. According to a report published by Forpost on 10 October 2025, the two institutions signed a memorandum of understanding in July 2024. In October 2025, an ISC delegation led by the institute's president, Mohammad Mehdi Alavianmehr, visited the university to discuss expanding scientific cooperation. The joint action plan for the 2025–2026 academic year included a proposal to establish a Russian-Iranian Center for Scientometric Research at the university, develop a network of scientific journals, prepare scientometric reports, and cooperate on ranking universities specializing in science and technology.

=== Cooperation with Indonesia ===
The Islamic World Science and Technology Citation and Monitoring Institute (ISC) signed a cooperation agreement with the Directorate General of Islamic Education of Indonesia's Ministry of Religious Affairs on 20 September 2017 in Jakarta. The agreement aimed to strengthen international academic and scientific cooperation. According to a report published in the ICC Jakarta archive, the planned areas of cooperation included increasing the international visibility of Indonesian research, cooperating on the identification and inclusion of Indonesian scientific journals in the ISC database, and providing scientometric training for researchers, particularly those affiliated with Islamic educational institutions.

=== Iraq ===
In February 2021, the University of Maysan announced that its journal, Abhath Maysan, had been included in the ISC Islamic World Journals Index.

In August 2022, the Karbala Center for Research and Studies announced that the peer-reviewed journal Al-Sibt had been added to the list of international journals recognized by ISC.

In October 2025, Al-Ameed University reported that its journal Taslim had received provisional acceptance into the ISC international database for a one-year period beginning on 13 October 2025.

=== Oman ===
According to a report published on 14 June 2020 by Anwar, a news portal affiliated with Sultan Qaboos University, several academic journals published by the university were included in ISC's journal listings. These included the Sultan Qaboos University Medical Journal, the Journal of Engineering Research, the Sultan Qaboos University Journal of Science and the Journal of Agricultural and Marine Sciences.

=== Egypt ===
A study published in the Egyptian Journal of Veterinary Sciences in 2022 cited ISC alongside other scientific databases, including Web of Science and Scopus, in its discussion of sources used in academic research.This reference indicates that ISC was cited as a research resource; however

=== Jordan ===
A study published in the journal Acta Informatica Medica in 2012 examined Jordanian journals listed in ISC databases. Based on the data available at the time, the study discussed nine English-language journals and 160 Arabic-language journals.

The indexing information for the Jordan Journal of Educational Sciences, published by Yarmouk University, and the Jordan Journal of Electrical Engineering also lists ISC among the relevant indexing services.These examples indicate that ISC has been referenced in connection with academic publications and research activities in several Islamic countries.

=== Turkey ===
On 15 February 2023, a delegation from the Islamic World Science Citation Center (ISC) visited TÜBİTAK ULAKBİM, Turkey's National Academic Network and Information Center, to discuss potential scientific cooperation. According to ULAKBİM's announcement, the meeting addressed the sharing of journal data, contributions to indexing databases, the organization of conferences and workshops, and participation in joint academic and scientific activities.

=== Pakistan ===
Several academic journals published in Pakistan list the Islamic World Science Citation Center (ISC) among their indexing services. The University of Management and Technology in Lahore identifies ISC among the indexing and abstracting services for its Journal of Quantitative Methods.

The official website of Shaheed Zulfiqar Ali Bhutto Medical University also lists ISC among the indexing services for Annals of PIMS, a medical journal published by the university.

=== Malaysia ===
Several academic journals published by Malaysian universities list the Islamic World Science Citation Center (ISC) among their indexing services.

The University of Malaya's Jurnal Syariah lists ISC among the databases and services indexing the journal.

The journal Ulum Islamiyyah, published by Universiti Sains Islam Malaysia, also identifies ISC among its indexing services.

In addition, the University of Science Malaysia's journal publishing platform provides information about the indexing services used by its academic publications.

=== Azerbaijan ===
The establishment of the Islamic World Science Citation Database (ISC) was announced in Baku, Azerbaijan, during the Fourth Islamic Conference of Ministers of Higher Education and Scientific Research, held on 6–8 October 2008. According to a report published by SciDev.Net on 17 October 2008, the member states of the Organisation of the Islamic Conference approved the creation of the citation centre, which was intended to assess scientific publications and research performance in Islamic countries.

Sakarya University's Library and Documentation Department also notes that the establishment of ISC was approved at a meeting of the Islamic Conference of Ministers of Higher Education and Scientific Research held by ISESCO in Baku in 2008.
