= Alireza Jafarzadeh =

Iranian political activist

- علیرضا جعفرزاده
- Born: 1957 (age 68–69); Mashhad, Imperial State of Iran
- Occupations: Middle East commentator, public speaker
- Political party: People's Mujahedin of Iran
- Website: alirezajafarzadeh.org

Alireza Jafarzadeh (Persian: علیرضا جعفرزاده) is an Iranian dissident, media commentator on the Middle East, and US representative of the People's Mujahedin of Iran. He is known for releasing information on Iran's secret nuclear program.

Jafarzadeh has published columns and appeared on television interviews both in conservative and liberal media. He seems to have bi-partisan respect for his work. Jafarzadeh has a regular column on the Huffington Post.

In 2006, Jafarzadeh was introduced as the last representative of the National Council of Resistance of Iran in an interview with Claude Salhani in which he responded to comments by Mahmoud Ahmadinejad made towards Israel.

In 2007, Jafarzadeh was a guest on CNN's Lou Dobbs Tonight news show, discussing Iran's proxy war in Iraq.

== Intelligence disclosures ==
In 2002, Jafarzadeh drew worldwide attention by revealing that Iran was running a secret nuclear facility in Natanz, and a dideuterium oxide facility in Arak. These revelations led to inspections of the sites by the International Atomic Energy Agency (IAEA). After their first inspection, IAEA, said in a report on Iran's nuclear activity that traces of uranium, greater than what is needed for a civilian power program, were found on Iranian nuclear equipment. However, Iran claimed that the source of the uranium was equipment imported to Iran from Pakistan. These revelations eventually led to United Nations Security Council's imposing sanctions on Iran on December 23, 2006, over its nuclear program.

In 2007, Jafarzadeh claimed that Iran's government had sharply increased its efforts to fan sectarian violence in Iraq, easily transferring money and arms across the Iraqi border.

In 2010, Jafarzadeh revealed satellite imagery and program details of a secret underground uranium enrichment facility under construction in Behjat-abad near Tehran, drawing international attention. In April 2011, Jafarzadeh then revealed a new nuclear site known as TABA, where Iran has secretly built centrifuge parts. In July, he further detailed the reorganization of Iran's nuclear program and the formation of a new organization run by the Defense Ministry, known by its Persian acronym, SPND, which oversees all nuclear weaponization work under the direct supervision of Iran's top nuclear scientist, Mohsen Fakhrizadeh Mahabadi. The information was compiled by the network inside Iran of Iran's opposition group, the MEK. This information provided by Jafarzadeh was later reflected in the November 2011 report of the International Atomic Energy Agency (IAEA).

In 2015, Jafarzadeh revealed that Iran has a hidden site, known as Lavizan-3, in a military complex in Tehran, where Iran has worked on research and development of advanced centrifuges, including IR-2m, and secretly enriched uranium in violation of the Joint Plan of Action. Members of Congress asked Secretary John Kerry about Lavizan-3, which he promised to follow up on. Still, there are no follow-up reports in the media suggesting that the United States or the IAEA has acted on this.
