= Lavizan-Shian =

Shian is one of the neighborhoods in the northeast of Tehran.

Shiyan neighborhood, which is located in district 4 of Tehran, is located in the north of Loizan Forest Park and south of Aja residential and military complex.

== Neighborhood ==
The streets of this neighborhood are named Xian and Xian 1 to 7 respectively. Shi'an neighborhood has a Hosseinieh and Loizan Hospital is located near it.

The highway under construction in Darabad is the closest highway to this neighborhood. A forest park named Xian and Xian Hotel are among the sightseeing places of the neighborhood. [1] Xian Village Hotel was built in 1375 by Region 4 Municipality in the northeastern part of Louisan Forest Park.

== Alleged nuclear site ==
Lavizan-Shian was an alleged undeclared nuclear site in north-eastern Tehran, Iran. The site was under investigation by the International Atomic Energy Agency (IAEA) as a potential undeclared nuclear site. According to Reuters, claims by the US that topsoil has been removed and the site had been sanitized could not be verified by IAEA investigators who visited Lavizan in 2005.
