= Morteza Rezaee =

Iranian military officer, second commander of the IRGC

Sardar Morteza Rezaee
- مرتضی رضایی
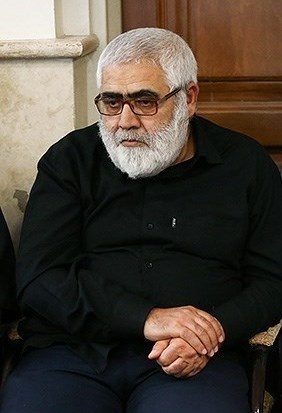
- Rezaee in 2014

Chairman of the IRGC Cooperation Bonyad
- In office 2007–2013
- President: Mahmoud Ahmadinejad
- Supreme Leader: Ali Khamenei
- Preceded by: Ali Akbar Ahmadian
- Succeeded by: Jamaladdin Aberoumand

Adviser to the Commander-in-Chief of the IRGC for Security and Economic Affairs
- In office 2008–?
- President: Mahmoud Ahmadinejad
- Supreme Leader: Ali Khamenei
- Preceded by: ?
- Succeeded by: ?

Deputy Commander of the Islamic Revolutionary Guard Corps
- In office 30 April 2006 – 22 May 2008
- President: Mahmoud Ahmadinejad
- Supreme Leader: Ali Khamenei
- Preceded by: Mohammad Bagher Zolghadr
- Succeeded by: Mohammad Hejazi

Director of IRGC Intelligence Protection Organization
- In office 6 March 1994 – 6 May 2006
- President: Akbar Hashemi Rafsanjani; Mohammad Khatami; Mahmoud Ahmadinejad
- Supreme Leader: Ali Khamenei
- Preceded by: Ali Saeedi Shahroudi
- Succeeded by: Gholam-Hossein Ramezani

Commander of Ramadan Headquarters
- In office 1983–1985
- President: Ali Khamenei
- Prime Minister: Mir-Hossein Mousavi
- Supreme Leader: Ruhollah Khomeini
- Preceded by: Office Established
- Succeeded by: Mohammad Bagher Zolghadr

2nd Commander-in-Chief of the Islamic Revolutionary Guard Corps
- In office 22 July 1980 – 20 September 1981
- President: Abolhassan Banisadr; Interim Presidential Council; Mohammad-Ali Rajai; Interim Presidential Council; Ali Khamenei
- Prime Minister: Mir-Hossein Mousavi
- Supreme Leader: Ruhollah Khomeini
- Preceded by: Abbas Aghazamani
- Succeeded by: Mohsen Rezaee

Military service
- Allegiance: Iran
- Branch/service: IRGC
- Years of service: 1979–2013
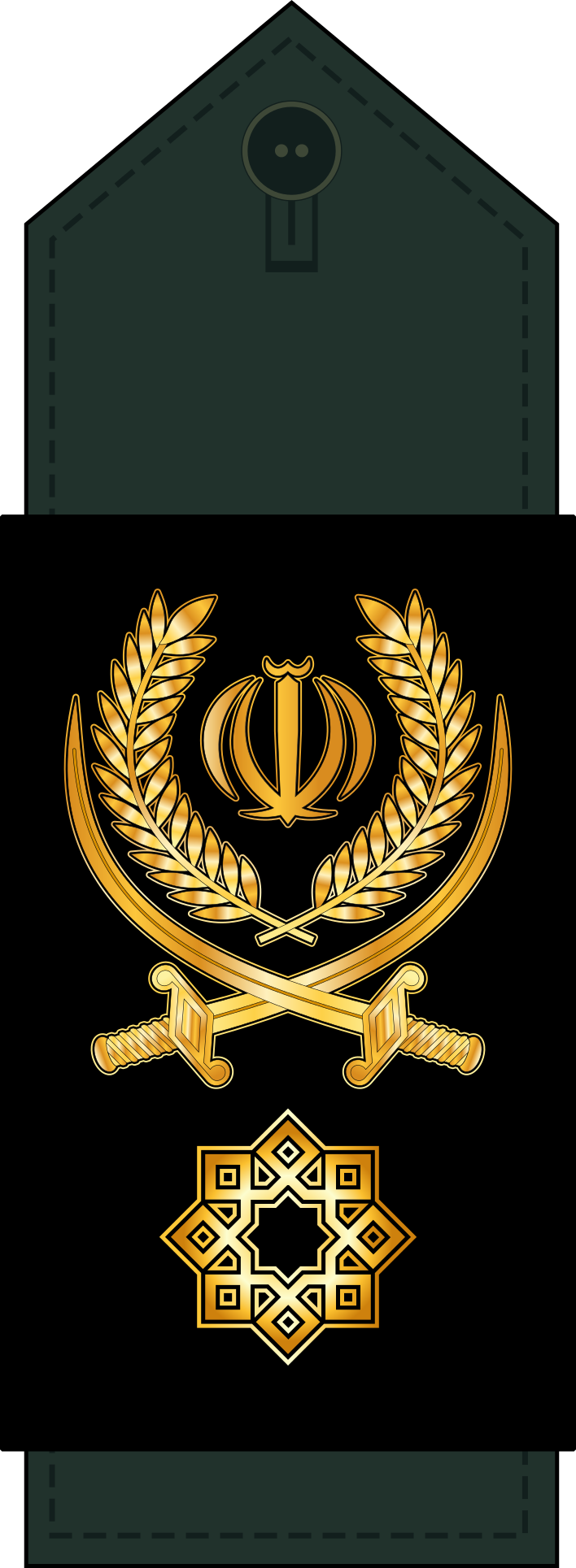
- Rank: Brigadier General
- Battles/wars: Iran–Iraq War

Morteza Rezaee (Persian: مرتضی رضایی) is a retired Islamic Revolutionary Guard Corps (IRGC) brigadier general who served as the second commander-in-chief of the IRGC from 1980 to 1981. He later headed the IRGC Intelligence Protection Organization and served as deputy commander-in-chief of the IRGC.

== Career ==
Rezaee joined the Islamic Revolutionary Guard Corps in 1979, shortly after the Iranian Revolution. Following the resignation of Abbas Aghazamani, he was appointed the second commander-in-chief of the IRGC, a post he held from 22 July 1980 to 20 September 1981, when he was succeeded by Mohsen Rezaee. During the Iran–Iraq War he commanded the Ramadan Headquarters from 1983 to 1985.

In 1994 he was appointed head of the Intelligence Protection Organization of the Islamic Revolutionary Guard Corps, a position he held for more than a decade until 2006. He subsequently served as deputy commander-in-chief of the IRGC from 2006 to 2008; he was named in this capacity, with the rank of brigadier general, in the annex to United Nations Security Council Resolution 1747 (2007).

Military offices
| Preceded by Abbas Aghazamani | Commander of the Islamic Revolutionary Guard Corps; 22 July 1980–20 September 1981 | Succeeded by Mohsen Rezaee as Commander-in-Chief of the Islamic Revolutionary Guard Corps |
| New title | Commander of Ramadan Headquarters; 1983–1985 | Succeeded by Mohammad Bagher Zolghadr |
| Preceded by Ali Saeedi Shahroudi | Director of IRGC Intelligence Protection Organization; 6 March 1994–6 May 2006 | Succeeded by Gholam-Hossein Ramezani |
| Vacant Title last held by Mohammad Bagher Zolghadr | Deputy Commander-in-Chief of the IRGC; 30 April 2006–22 May 2008 | Succeeded by Mohammad Hejazi |
| Preceded by ? | Adviser to the Commander-in-Chief of the IRGC for Security and Economic Affairs; 2008–? | Succeeded by ? |
| Preceded by Ali Akbar Ahmadian | Chairman of the IRGC Cooperation Bonyad; 2007–2013 | Succeeded by Jamaladdin Aberoumand |
