= Ministry of Foreign Affairs (Iran) =

Government ministry of Iran

- وزارت امور خارجه; Vezārat-e Omūr-e Khārejeh
- Logo of the Iran Ministry of Foreign Affairs

- Flag of the Iran Ministry of Foreign Affairs

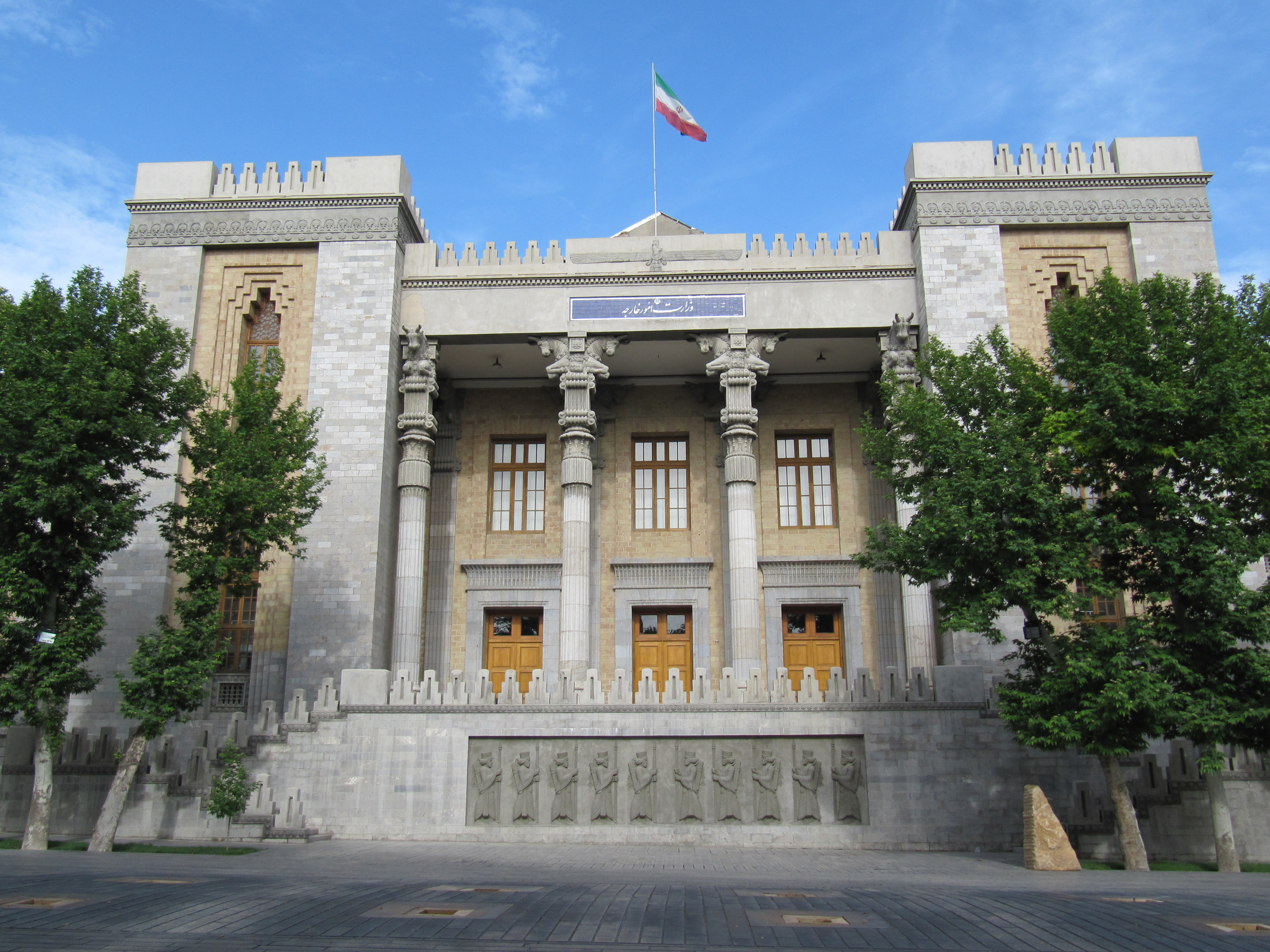
- Ministry Building (Shahrbani Palace)

Agency overview
- Formed: 15 October 1821; 205 years ago
- Jurisdiction: Government of the Islamic Republic of Iran
- Headquarters: National Garden, Tehran; 35°41′15.22″N 51°25′2.26″E
- Employees: 3,518 (2019)
- Annual budget: 31.4 billion Iranian rials (2021)
- Minister responsible: Abbas Araghchi
- Website: Farsi, English, Arabic

The Ministry of Foreign Affairs (Persian: وزارت امور خارجه, romanized: Vezārat-e Omūr-e Khārejeh) is an Iranian government ministry headed by the minister of foreign affairs, who is a member of cabinet. The office is currently held by Abbas Araghchi after the death of Hossein Amir-Abdollahian.

Foreign policy decisions are made in the Supreme National Security Council and according to Mojtaba Khamenei's high courts.

== Ministers and officials ==
The first minister of foreign affairs of Iran was Mirza Abdulvahab Khan, who served from 1821 to 1823.

The current officials of the Ministry of Foreign Affairs are:

- Minister of Foreign Affairs – Abbas Araghchi
- Deputy for Political Affairs – Majid Takht-Ravanchi
- Deputy for Legal & International Affairs – Kazem Gharibabadi
- Deputy for Economic Diplomacy – Hamid Ghanbari
- Deputy for Consular, Parliamentary and Iranian Expatriates Affairs – Vahid Jalalzadeh
- Deputy for Administrative and Financial Affairs – Mehdi Sobhani
- Spokesman & Head of the Center for Public and Media Diplomacy – Esmaeil Baghaee
- Head of the Center for Political and International Studies – Saeed Khatibzadeh
- Foreign Minister's Senior Adviser for Special Political Affairs – Ali Asghar Khaji

== Assigned activities ==
Since 5 September 2013, the ministry has been responsible for the negotiation of the Comprehensive agreement on Iranian nuclear program, which had previously been carried out by the Supreme National Security Council.

In 2023 ministry and president began an Africa tour of three states to boost relations.

== Building ==
The building of the ministry was completed in 1939.

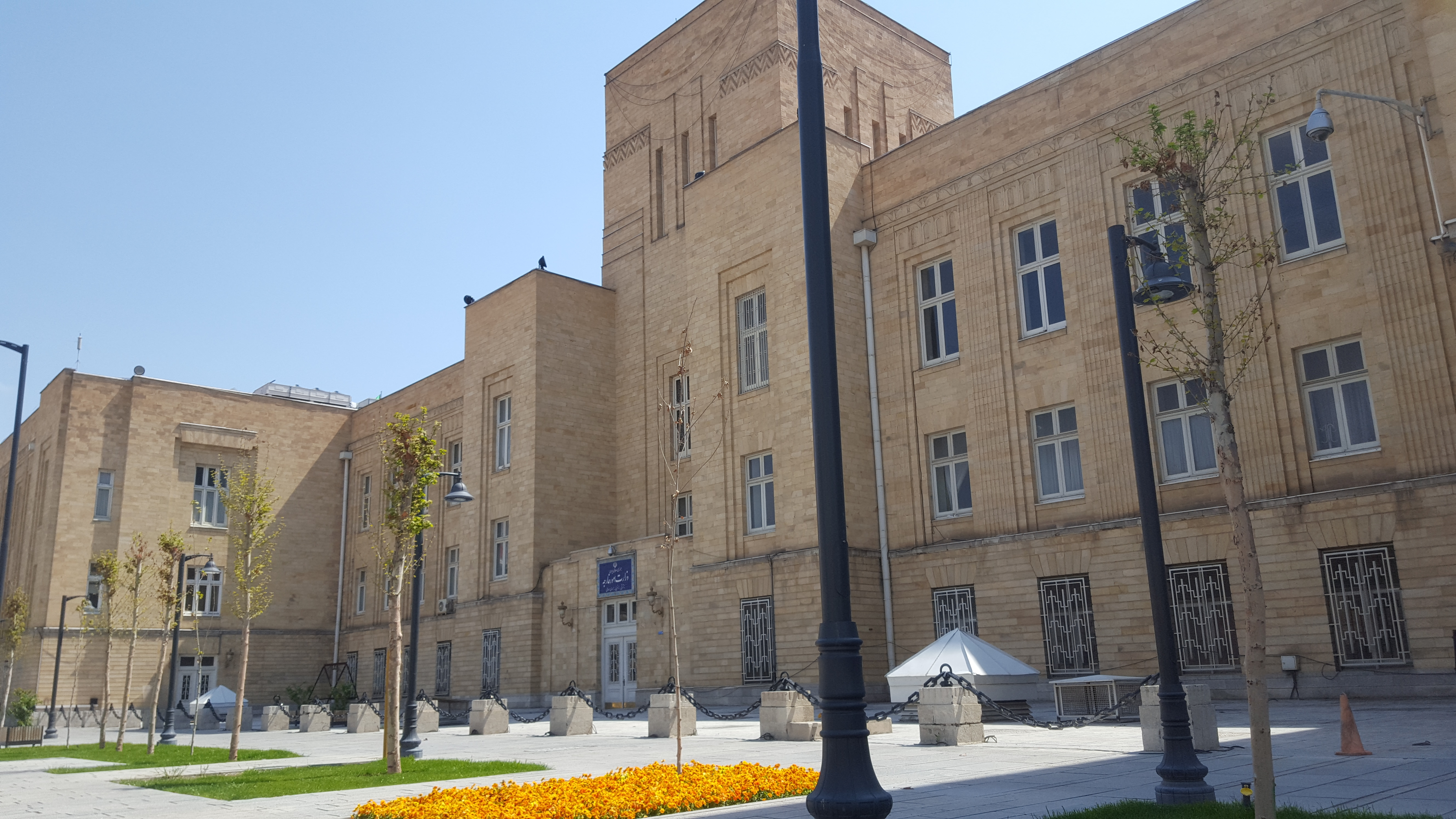
Minister's office

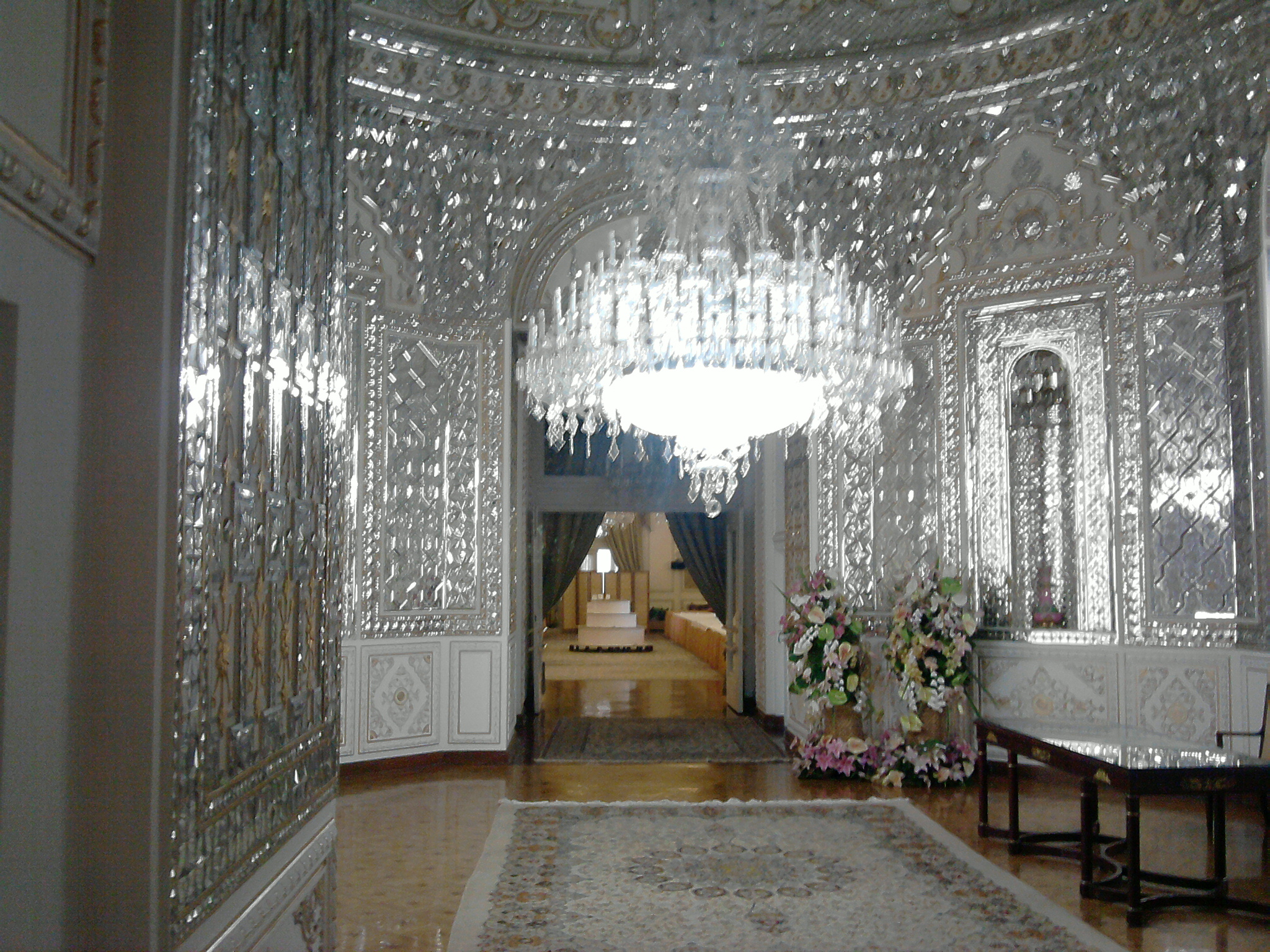
Foreign Ministry Reception Hall featuring ayeneh-kari

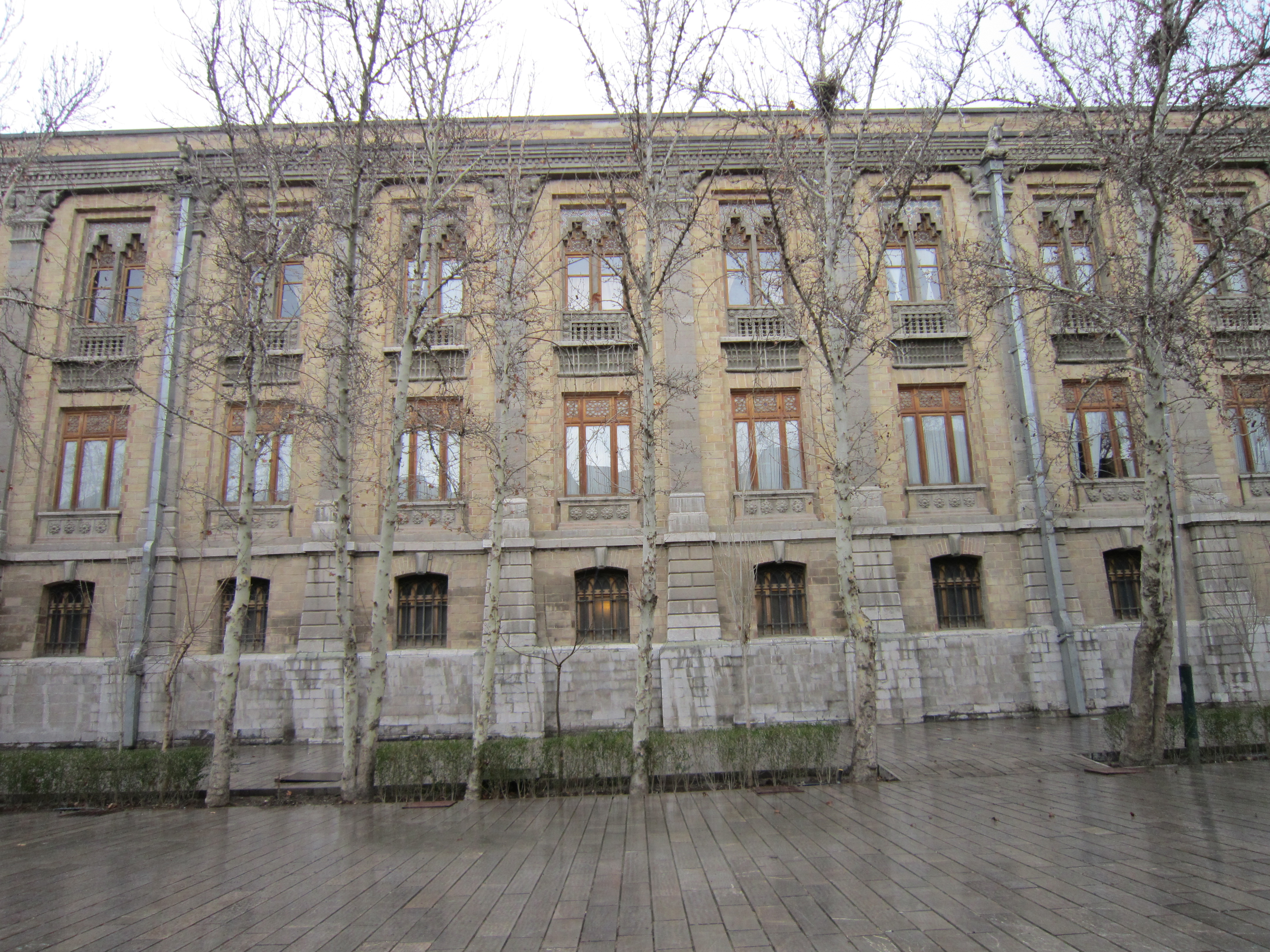
Shahrbani Palace

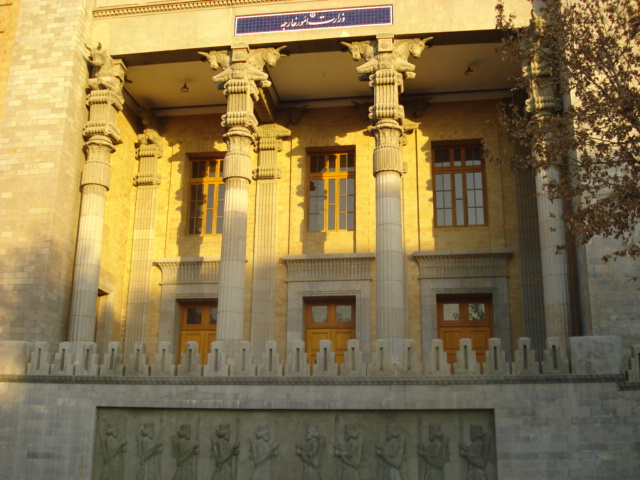
One of the buildings of the Foreign Ministry

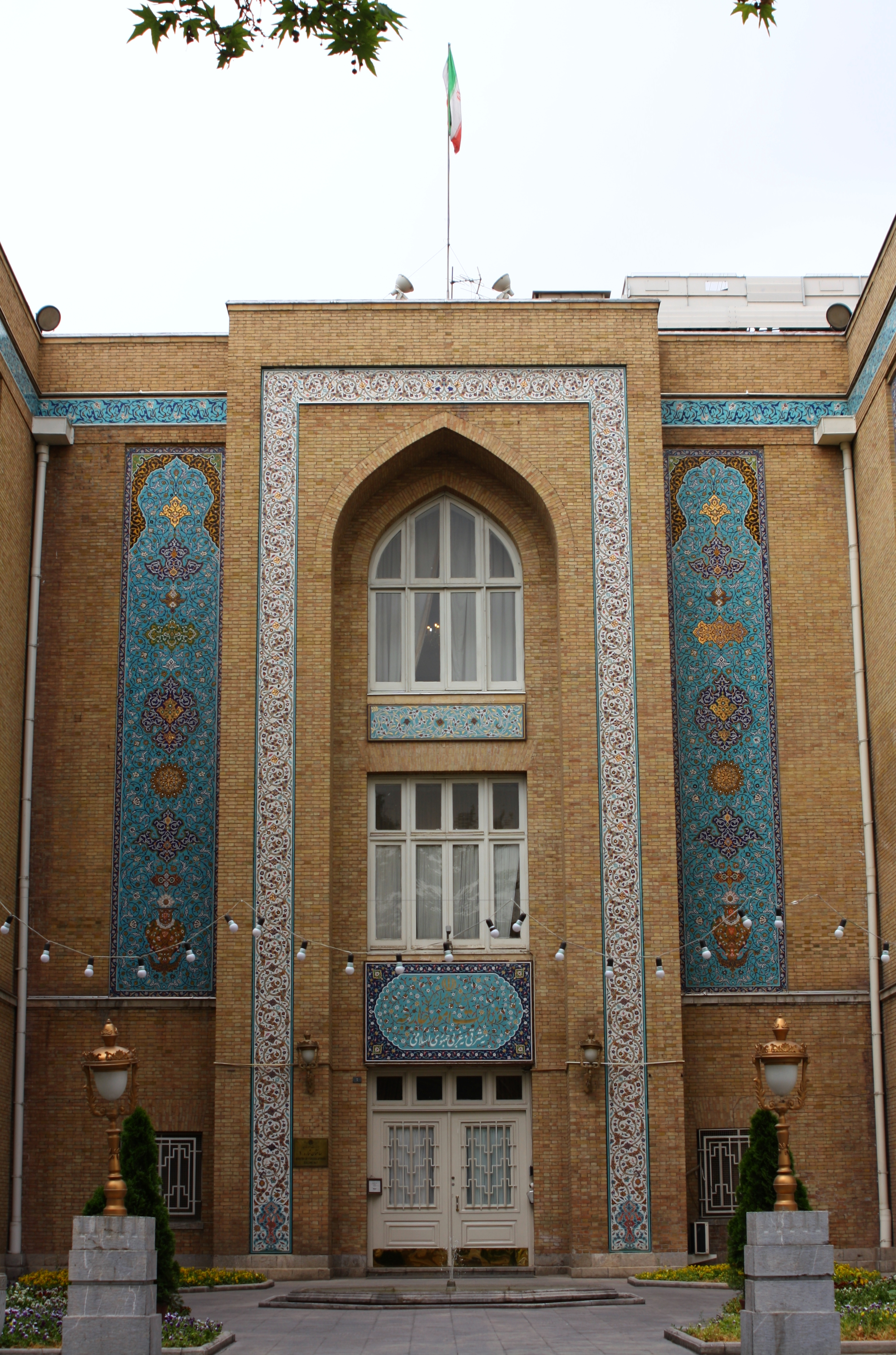
Entrance of the 8th building

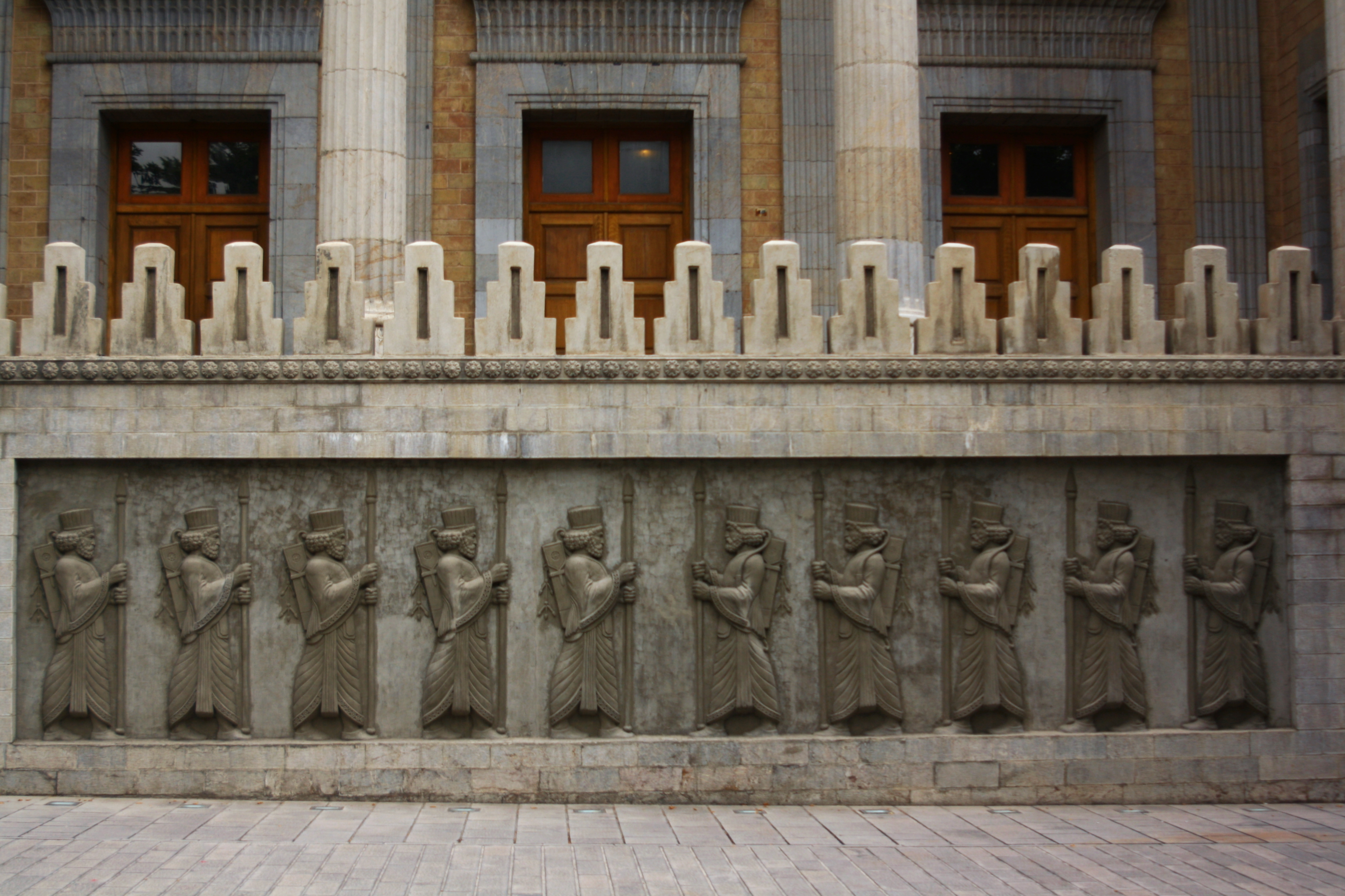
Entrance of the Main building

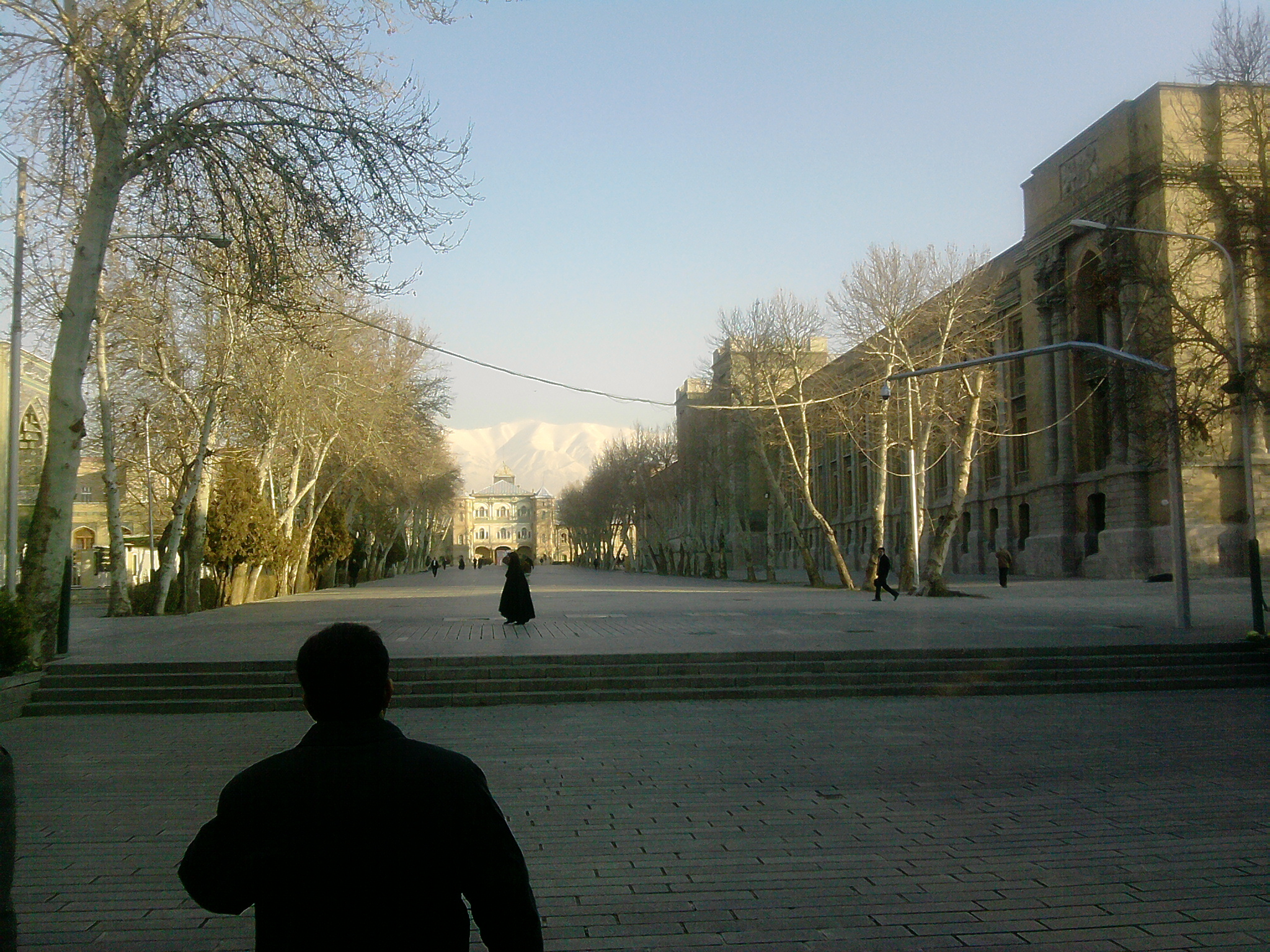
United Nations street

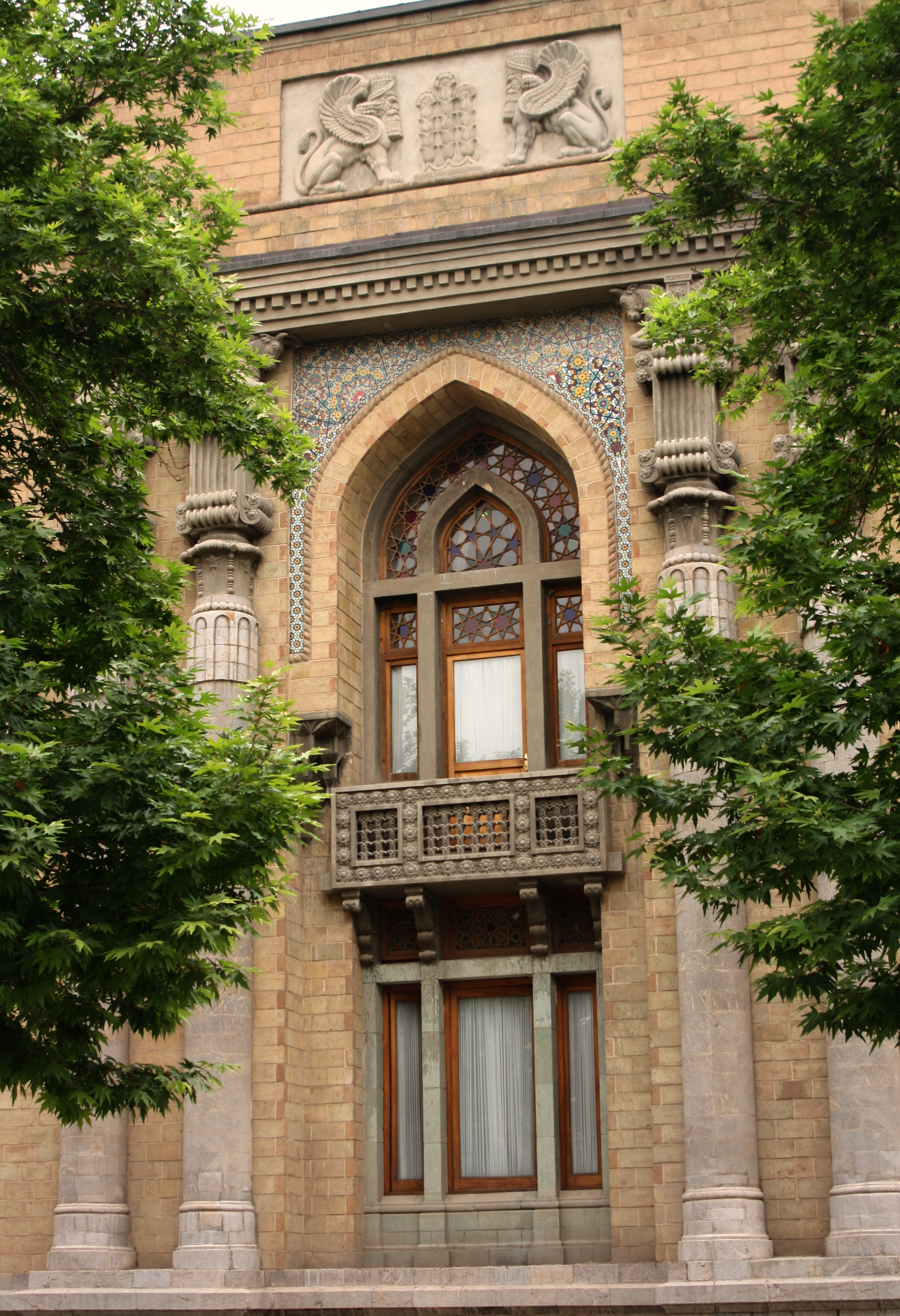
Windows and balconies

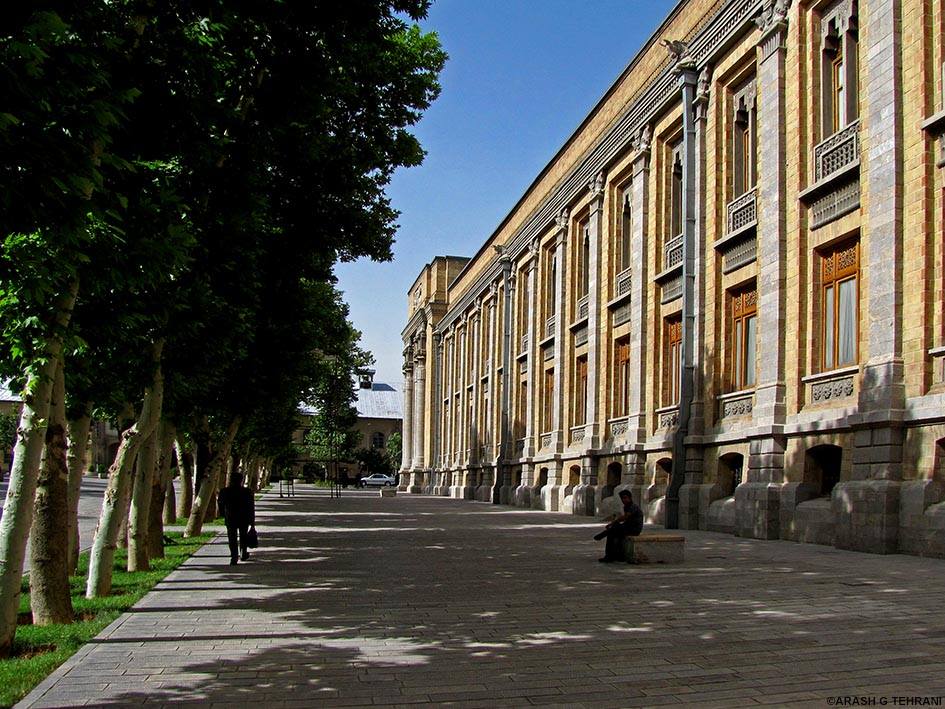
Shahrbani Palace (2)

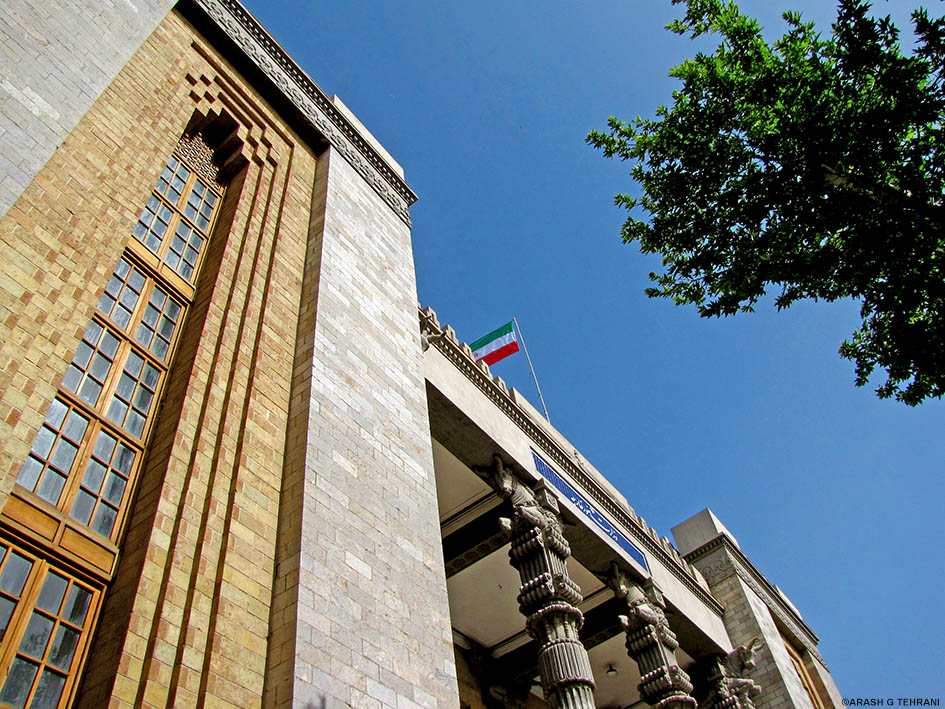
Shahrbani Palace (3)

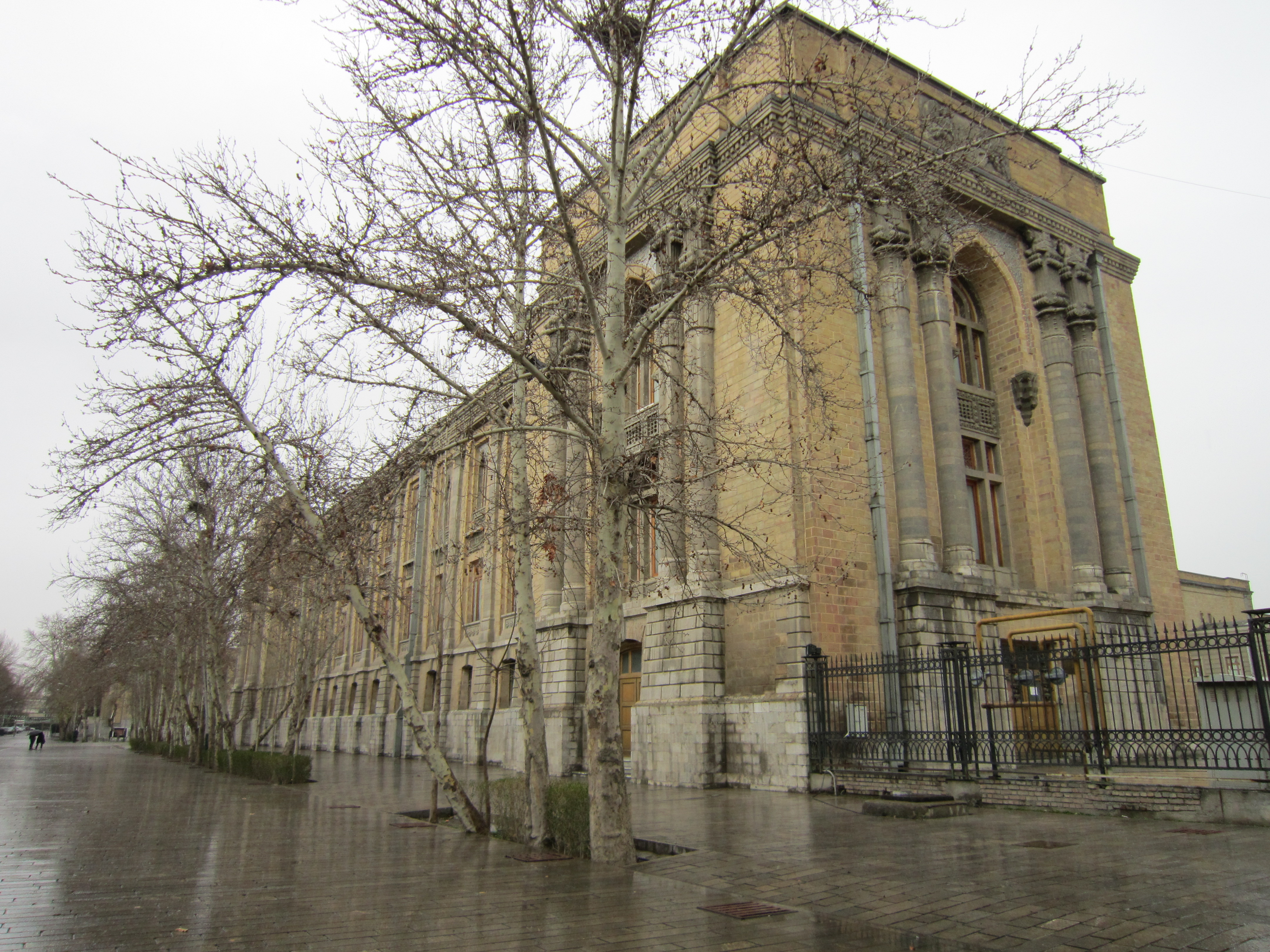
South side

== See also ==
- Commission of National-Security and Foreign-Policy (of Islamic Parliament of I.R.Iran)
- Foreign relations of Iran
- Politics of Iran
