= Ahmad Vahidi =

Iranian military officer (born 1958)

Sardar Ahmad Vahidi
- احمد وحیدی
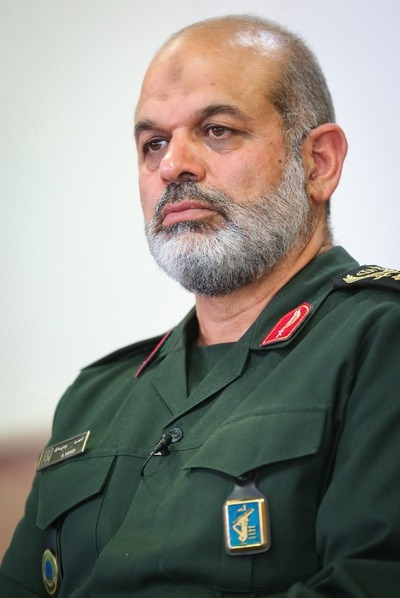
- Vahidi in 2020

Commander-in-Chief of the Islamic Revolutionary Guard Corps
- Incumbent
- Assumed office 1 March 2026
- President: Masoud Pezeshkian
- Supreme Leader: Mojtaba Khamenei (Note: Between Ali Khamenei's death on 28 February and Mojtaba Khamenei's election on 8 March, an interim leadership council composed of Pezeshkian, Chief Justice Gholam-Hossein Mohseni-Eje'i, and Alireza Arafi was tasked with handing the duties of the supreme leader.)
- Preceded by: Mohammad Pakpour
- Acting; 13 June 2025
- President: Masoud Pezeshkian
- Supreme Leader: Ali Khamenei
- Preceded by: Hossein Salami
- Succeeded by: Mohammad Pakpour

Deputy Commander of the Islamic Revolutionary Guard Corps
- In office 27 December 2025 – 1 March 2026
- President: Masoud Pezeshkian
- Supreme Leader: Ali Khamenei
- Preceded by: Ali Fadavi
- Succeeded by: Mostafa Izadi
Other posts held
Minister of Interior
In office 25 August 2021 – 21 August 2024
President	Ebrahim Raisi; Mohammad Mokhber (acting); Masoud Pezeshkian
Supreme Leader	Ali Khamenei
Preceded by	Abdolreza Rahmani Fazli
Succeeded by	Eskandar Momeni
Minister of Defence and Armed Forces Logistics
In office 3 September 2009 – 15 August 2013
President	Mahmoud Ahmadinejad; Hassan Rouhani
Supreme Leader	Ali Khamenei
Preceded by	Mostafa Mohammad-Najjar
Succeeded by	Hossein Dehghan
Deputy Minister of Defence and Armed Forces Logistics
In office 2005–2009
President	Mohammad Khatami; Mahmoud Ahmadinejad
Supreme Leader	Ali Khamenei
Preceded by	Ali Hosseini-Tash
Succeeded by	Ahmad Vahid Dastjerdi
Deputy Minister of Defence and Armed Forces Logistics for planning
In office 2003–2005
President	Mohammad Khatami
Supreme Leader	Ali Khamenei
Preceded by	?
Succeeded by	Nosratollah Ezzati
President of the Supreme National Defense University
In office 2016–2021
President	Hassan Rouhani
Supreme Leader	Ali Khamenei
Preceded by	Ebrahim Hassan-Beigi
Succeeded by	Esmail Ahmadi-Moghaddam
Chairman of the Center for Strategic Defence Research
In office 2013–2016
President	Hassan Rouhani
Supreme Leader	Ali Khamenei
Preceded by	Ali Shamkhani
Succeeded by	Merge in SNDU
Head of IRGC Intelligence
In office 1998–?
President	Mohammad Khatami
Supreme Leader	Ali Khamenei
Preceded by	Gholamreza Mehrabi
Succeeded by	?
In office 1985–1988
President	Ali Khamenei
Prime Minister	Mir-Hossein Mousavi
Supreme Leader	Ruhollah Khomeini
Preceded by	Seyyed Kazem Kazemi
Succeeded by	?
1st Commander of the Quds Force
In office 1988 – 21 March 1998
President	Ali Khamenei; Akbar Hashemi Rafsanjani; Mohammad Khatami
Supreme Leader	Ruhollah Khomeini; Ali Khamenei
Preceded by	Office Established
Succeeded by	Qasem Soleimani

Member of Expediency Discernment Council
- Incumbent
- Assumed office 14 March 2012
- Appointed by: Ali Khamenei
- Chairman: Akbar Hashemi Rafsanjani; Ali Movahedi-Kermani (Acting); Mahmoud Hashemi Shahroudi; Sadiq Larijani

Personal details
- Born: Vahid Shahcheraghi; 27 June 1958 (age 68) Shiraz, Pahlavi Iran

Military service
- Allegiance: Iran
- Branch/service: Islamic Revolutionary Guard Corps
- Years of service: 1979–present
- Rank: Major General
- Unit: Quds Force
- Battles/wars: Iran–Iraq War; KDPI insurgency (1989–1996); Insurgency in Sistan and Balochistan; Syrian civil war; Iranian intervention in Syria; War in Iraq (2013–2017); Iranian intervention in Iraq; Iran–PJAK conflict; Western Iran clashes; 2024 Iran–Israel conflict; Twelve-Day War; 2026 Iran war

Vahid Shahcheraghi (Persian: وحید شاه‌چراغی, born 27 June 1958) better known as Ahmad Vahidi, (Note: Persian: احمد وحیدی) is an Iranian major general currently serving as Commander-in-Chief of the Islamic Revolutionary Guard Corps (IRGC) since 1 March 2026 and a member of the Expediency Discernment Council.

In 1988, he was appointed commander of the IRGC's extraterritorial unit, the Quds Force. He was the minister of defense under Mahmoud Ahmadinejad from 3 September 2009 until 15 August 2013. Vahidi was president of the Supreme National Defense University from August 2016 to 2021. He served as the deputy commander of the IRGC from December 2025 until the death of Mohammad Pakpour in the 2026 Iran war. Vahidi also served as the Minister of Interior from 2021 to 2024.

He is sanctioned by Canada, the United States and the European Union for alleged involvement in terrorism and nuclear proliferation. Argentina's highest court formally charged Vahidi for the 1994 attack on the AMIA Jewish Community center in Buenos Aires. Argentina issued an Interpol arrest warrant against him.

== Early life and education ==
Vahid Shah Cheraghi was born on 27 June 1958 in Shiraz. He holds a bachelor's degree in electronics and a master's degree in industrial engineering. He acquired a doctorate in strategic studies from Imam Sadiq University.

== Career ==
Vahidi joined the Islamic Revolutionary Guard Corps (IRGC) in 1979. He was made deputy to the then IRGC commander Mohsen Rezaee for intelligence affairs in 1981. The same year, he was also named commander of the Balaal base. In 1983, he joined the Quds Force, an IRGC extraterritorial and special forces unit, which specializes in unconventional warfare and military intelligence operations. He holds the rank of brigadier general. From 1988 to 1998, he led the Quds Force.

Vahidi was appointed deputy minister of defense in 2005 when Mostafa Mohammad-Najjar became minister of defense. He was in office until 2009. In August 2009, he was appointed minister of defense by President Mahmoud Ahmadinejad. He received 79.3% of the votes of the members of the parliament. Vahidi's term ended on 15 August 2013 and Hossein Dehghan replaced him in the post. As defence minister, Vahidi prioritized strengthening Lebanon's army as one of Iran's strategic objectives.

He was appointed the temporary chief of the Islamic Revolutionary Guard Corps following the death of former commander-in-chief Hossein Salami during the June 2025 Israeli strikes on Iran. On 1 March 2026, he was appointed as the commander-in-chief of the IRGC, following the death of Mohammad Pakpour in the 2026 Iran war.

== Controversies ==
According to Mohammad Ali Shabani of the Middle Eastern newspaper Amwaj, Vahidi is a known hardliner as the commander-in-chief of the IRGC compared to his predecessors, Mohammad Pakpour and Hossein Salami.

Vahidi is subject to sanctions imposed by the United States and the European Union on allegations of involvement in terrorism and nuclear proliferation activities.

=== Nuclear weapons development ===
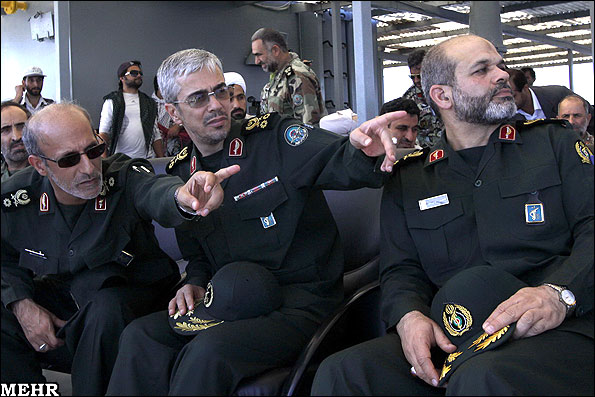
Vahidi and Mohammad Bagheri, May 2010

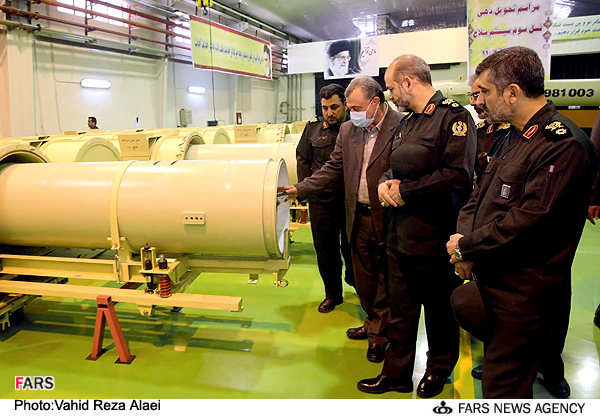
Vahidi and Amir Ali Hajizadeh during the IRGC delivery of third-generation Fateh-110 missiles, September 2010

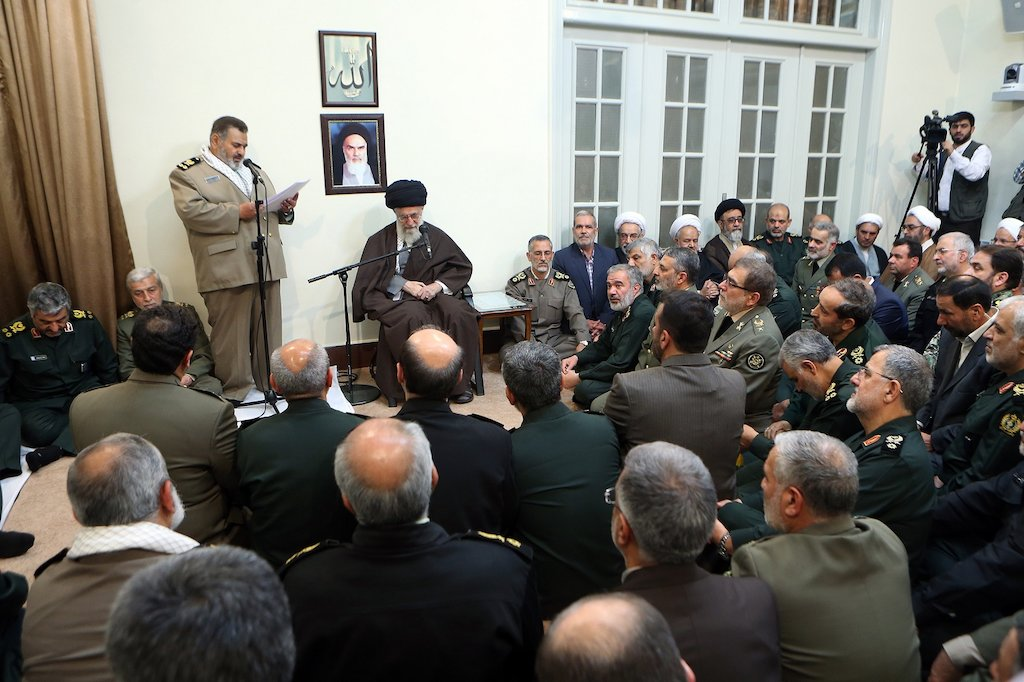
Ali Khamenei meeting with senior commanders of Iran's armed forces, including Qasem Soleimani and Ahmad Vahidi, April 2016

According to The Daily Telegraph, Vahidi was one of the hand-picked individuals who joined a secretive cohort accompanying Supreme Leader Ali Khamenei's trip to North Korea during the 1980s, which was "designed to acquire missile and nuclear technology." In June 2010, Vahidi was blacklisted by the US government. This measure aims to freeze the assets of proliferators of weapons of mass destruction (WMD) and their supporters, thereby isolating them from the US financial and commercial systems.

=== Mahsa Amini protests ===
In 2022 amid the Mahsa Amini protests, Vahidi criticized those inciting violence and following the "United States, European countries and anti-revolutionary groups." Later, he was sanctioned by the US government for serious human rights violations due to him maintaining oversight over all Police Command of the Islamic Republic of Iran (FARAJA), which were deployed to suppress protesters.

=== Anti-American activities ===
According to the Foundation for Defense of Democracies, Vahidi's time at the IRGC is "replete with efforts to kill Americans" coinciding with threats from Tehran toward US personnel. As a leader of the Quds Force, he was linked to the 1983 bombing of US Marine barracks in Beirut. In the mid-1980s, Vahidi was involved in secret contacts between Iran and US President Ronald Reagan's administration related to the Iran-Contra affair and arms deliveries. Additionally, he was suspected of involvement in the 1996 bombing of the Khobar Towers in Saudi Arabia.

=== Jewish center bombing ===
Vahidi has been wanted by Interpol since 2007 for his alleged participation in the bombing of the Jewish community center in Buenos Aires, Argentina, on 18 July 1994, in which 85 people were killed. Vahidi was serving as the commander of a special unit of Iran's Revolutionary Guard known as the Quds Force when the attack took place. He is one of five Iranians sought in the bombing. Iran denies that it was involved, while Argentine prosecutors accuse him of involvement in planning and executing the attack.

In 2009, his anti-Zionist speech during his nomination as defence secretary was well received by the Iranian parliament, with deputies chanting "death to Israel". His nomination as defence minister was condemned by the Argentinian government.

In 2010, he urged the international community to "fully boycott" and "fully cut diplomatic, economic and political ties with the Zionist regime" in support of killed activists delivering aid at the Gaza Strip.

In May 2011, Vahidi paid an official visit to Bolivia. In June 2011, Bolivia apologized to Argentina for Vahidi visiting the country, and announced that he would be leaving the country immediately.

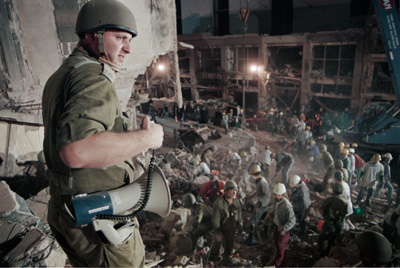
Vahidi is accused of being one of those responsible for the AMIA bombing in Argentina.

In January 2015, Argentine federal prosecutor Alberto Nisman, who was investigating the AMIA bombing, was scheduled to appear before the Argentine National Congress to denounce the National Government for conspiring with the Iranian regime to lift INTERPOL's red notices against those accused of the attack and prevent the trial from continuing, in exchange for oil and grain purchases. Nisman was found shot in the head and dead in the bathroom of his Buenos Aires apartment one day before his scheduled appearance before Congress.

In August 2021, Vahidi was made Interior Minister by the newly elected president Ebrahim Raisi. This triggered condemnation from Argentina given his suspected role in the 1994 AMIA bombing, with the now-former head of the Ministry of Foreign Affairs and Worship of Argentina describing the appointment of Vahidi as "an insult to Argentina and a blow to the families of the victims" of the bombing.

In April 2024, Argentina's criminal court (Court of cassation) ruled that the attack had been planned by Iran, and carried out by the Iran-backed organization Hezbollah. In May 2024 the Argentine Foreign Ministry officially announced that Interpol had issued a red notice for the arrest of Vahidi in connection with the AMIA bombing. This red notice states that Vahidi is being sought by Argentina for charges of alleged aggravated murder and damages.

=== 2026 Iran war ===
During the 2026 Iran war, Iran International reported major disagreements between Vahidi and Iranian president Masoud Pezeshkian about how to handle the economic effects of the war. Later reports indicated that Vahidi was practically controlling the country, blocking the attempts of Pezeshkian to appoint a new intelligence minister. It was said that all candidates including Hossein Dehghan were rejected by Vahidi, and that that he insisted that during wartime all critical and sensitive leadership positions must be decided by the IRGC.

According to a New York Times investigation, Vahidi was among the powerful figures pushing for Mojtaba Khamenei’s appointment as Iran’s supreme leader.

On 21 April, the Institute for the Study of War reported a major disagreement between Vahidi and Iranian parliament speaker Mohammad Bagher Ghalibaf, with Ghalibaf favoring participating in negotiations and Vahidi opposing participation.

On August 10, Aljazeera reported Vahidi is official confirmed appointed Chief of Commander IRGC with the rank of Major General.

== Notes ==
Military offices
Preceded by Mohammad Pakpour	Commander of the Islamic Revolutionary Guard Corps; 1 March 2026–present	Incumbent
Preceded by Hossein Salami	Acting Commander of the Islamic Revolutionary Guard Corps; 13 June 2025	Succeeded by Mohammad Pakpour
Preceded by Ali Fadavi	Deputy Commander of the Islamic Revolutionary Guard Corps; 27 December 2025–1 March 2026	Succeeded by Mostafa Izadi
New title	Commander of Revolutionary Guards Quds Force; 1988–1998	Succeeded by Qasem Soleimani
Preceded by Seyyed Kazem Kazemi	Head of Revolutionary Guards Intelligence office 1985–1988; 1998–?	Succeeded by ?
Preceded by ?	Head of Revolutionary Guards Intelligence office 1985–1988; 1998–?	Succeeded by ?
Political offices
Preceded by Abdolreza Rahmani Fazli	Minister of Interior; 25 August 2021–21 August 2024	Succeeded by Eskandar Momeni
Preceded by Mostafa Mohammad-Najjar	Minister of Defense; 3 September 2009–15 August 2013	Succeeded by Hossein Dehghan
Preceded by Ali Hosseini-Tash	Deputy Minister of Defense; 2005–2009	Succeeded by Ahmad Vahid Dastjerdi
Preceded by ?	Vice Minister of Defense for planning 2003–2005	Succeeded by Nosratollah Ezzati
Academic offices
Preceded by Ebrahim Hassan-Beigi	President of the Supreme National Defense University; 2016–2021	Succeeded by Esmail Ahmadi-Moghaddam
Preceded by Ali Shamkhani	Chairman of the Center for Strategic Defence Research; 2013–2016	Merge in SNDU
