= Yahya Rahim Safavi =

Iranian military commander (born 1952)

Sardar Seyyed Yahya Safavi
- یحیی صفوی
- Safavi in 2018

President of the Sacred Defense Sciences and Teachings Research Institute
- Incumbent
- Assumed office 30 November 2019
- President: Hassan Rouhani; Ebrahim Raisi; Mohammad Mokhber (acting); Masoud Pezeshkian
- Supreme Leader: Ali Khamenei; Mojtaba Khamenei
- Preceded by: Mohammad Nabi Roudaki

Senior Military Assistant and Adviser to the Commander-in-Chief of the Armed Forces
- Incumbent
- Assumed office 2 October 2007
- President: Mahmoud Ahmadinejad; Hassan Rouhani; Ebrahim Raisi; Mohammad Mokhber (acting); Masoud Pezeshkian
- Supreme Leader: Ali Khamenei; Mojtaba Khamenei
- Preceded by: Office Established

4th Commander-in-Chief of the Islamic Revolutionary Guard Corps
- In office 19 September 1997 – 10 September 2007
- President: Mohammad Khatami; Mahmoud Ahmadinejad
- Supreme Leader: Ali Khamenei
- Preceded by: Mohsen Rezaee
- Succeeded by: Mohammad Ali Jafari
Other posts held
President of the Iranian Geopolitical Association
In office 2012–2016
Preceded by	Mohammad-Reza Hafeznia
Succeeded by	Mohammad-Hossein Papoli Yazdi
In office 2018–2020
Preceded by	Mohammad-Hossein Papoli Yazdi
Succeeded by	Hadi Azami
Chairman of the Defense and Security Commission of the Strategic Council on Foreign Relations
Incumbent
Assumed office 2023
President	Ebrahim Raisi; Mohammad Mokhber (acting); Masoud Pezeshkian
Supreme Leader	Ali Khamenei; Mojtaba Khamenei
Preceded by	Hossein Dehghan
Commander of Thar-Allah Headquarters
In office 1995–1999
President	Akbar Hashemi Rafsanjani; Mohammad Khatami
Supreme Leader	Ali Khamenei
Preceded by	Office Established
Succeeded by	Hossein Nejat
Deputy Commander of the Islamic Revolutionary Guard Corps
In office 24 September 1989 – 10 September 1997
President	Akbar Hashemi Rafsanjani; Mohammad Khatami
Supreme Leader	Ali Khamenei
Preceded by	Ali Shamkhani
Succeeded by	Mohammad Bagher Zolghadr
Commander of the IRGC Ground Forces
Acting; 20 September 1988 – 24 September 1989
President	Ali Khamenei; Akbar Hashemi Rafsanjani
Prime Minister	Mir-Hossein Mousavi
Supreme Leader	Ruhollah Khomeini; Ali Khamenei
Preceded by	Ali Shamkhani
Succeeded by	Mostafa Izadi
In office 17 September 1985 – 30 April 1986
President	Ali Khamenei
Prime Minister	Mir-Hossein Mousavi
Supreme Leader	Ruhollah Khomeini
Preceded by	Office Established
Succeeded by	Ali Shamkhani
Deputy Commander of the IRGC Ground Forces
In office 1986–1989
President	Ali Khamenei; Akbar Hashemi Rafsanjani
Prime Minister	Mir-Hossein Mousavi
Supreme Leader	Ruhollah Khomeini; Ali Khamenei
Preceded by	Gholam Ali Rashid
Succeeded by	Abbas Mohtaj

Personal details
- Born: 1952 (age 73–74) Homam, Pahlavi Iran
- Awards: Fath grade 1 Fath grade 1 Fath grade 2

Military service
- Allegiance: Pahlavi Iran; Iran
- Branch/service: Imperial Iranian Ground Force; Islamic Revolutionary Guard Corps
- Years of service: 1975; 1979–present
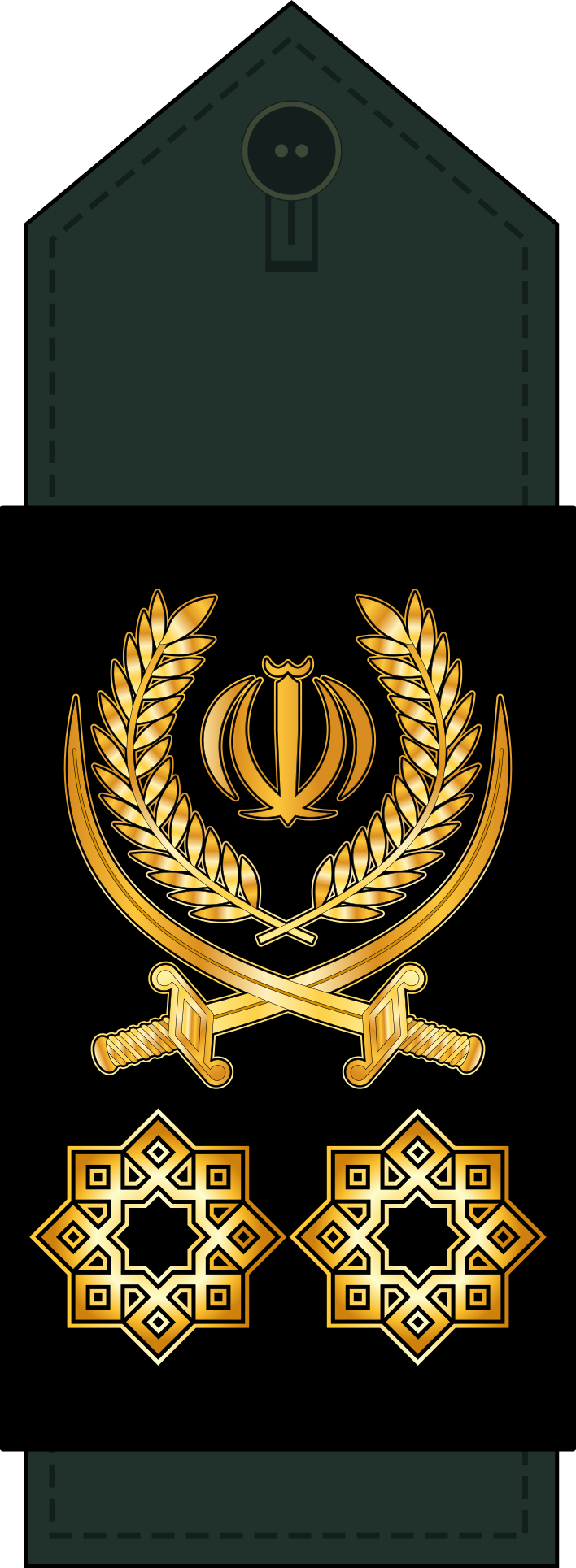
- Rank: Second Lieutenant Major General
- Unit: 55th Airborne Brigade (1975); Ground Forces
- Commands: Commander of Karbala Headquarters (1981); Commander of IRGC Forces in Kurdistan province (1980)
- Battles/wars: Iran–Iraq War; KDPI insurgency (1989–1996); War in Afghanistan (2001–2021); 2001 uprising in Herat; Insurgency in Sistan and Balochistan; Syrian civil war; Iranian intervention in Syria; War in Iraq (2013–2017); Iranian intervention in Iraq; Iran–PJAK conflict; Western Iran clashes; 2019–2021 Persian Gulf crisis; 2024 Iran–Israel conflict; Twelve-Day War; 2026 Iran war

Yahya "Rahim" Safavi (Persian: یحیی «رحیم» صفوی, born 1952) is an Iranian military commander who served as the chief commander of the Islamic Revolutionary Guard Corps. Currently, Safavi is serving as a senior military advisor to the leader of the Islamic revolution. Additionally, he has assumed the role of head of Defense and Security Commission within the Strategic Council on Foreign Relations.

== Early life ==
Safavi was born in 1952 in the Village of Homam, Lenjan County, Isfahan province, to a Persian family originally from Shahr-e Kord.

In 1969, while he was completing his final year of high school, his mother died of cancer and was buried at Takht-e Foulad Cemetery in Isfahan. After receiving his high school diploma, Safavi took the national university entrance examination. Upon passing, he enrolled in 1971 in the Bachelor's program in Geology at the University of Tabriz.

From the beginning of the 1970s, he became involved in clandestine activities against the Pahlavi regime. To avoid being identified by SAVAK (the Shah's intelligence and security service), he adopted the alias "Rahim."

According to Safavi, the greatest challenge he faced as a student in Tabriz was not knowing the Azerbaijani language and not having access to student housing. He recalled:

When I arrived in Tabriz, I encountered several difficulties. One of them was that I did not know Turkish at all—not even a single word. Because I could not speak Turkish, it was difficult for me to get answers from people. This challenge made me determined, from my very first months there, to learn the language. During the years I lived in Tabriz, I learned Turkish so well that I could speak it fluently in the streets and markets, and no one could tell that I was originally from Isfahan.

Safavi received his Bachelor's degree in Geology in 1975. That same year, he began his compulsory military service, spending most of it at the Shiraz Infantry Training Center and with the 55th Airborne Brigade.

He recalled:

I served in the Second Company of the 135th Airborne Battalion at the 55th Airborne Brigade in Shiraz. Holding the rank of Second Lieutenant (conscript officer), I served as the platoon commander of the Second Company of that battalion.

During his time as a student at the University of Tabriz Safavi, together with a number of other students, helped establish student organizations. He also participated in several demonstrations against the Pahlavi regime in the city of Tabriz. During one of these protests, he was shot in the leg and wounded.

In his book, Oral History: The Narrative of Seyyed Yahya Safavi, he describes the incident as follows:

During the clashes in Tabriz on 18 February 1978 (29 Bahman 1356), several friends and I were inside a car when, on Mansour Street, a SAVAK vehicle cut us off and opened fire on us. I was sitting in the front seat. A bullet came through the front door of the car and struck my left leg, becoming lodged there. Blood poured from my trouser leg. I immediately gripped the upper part of my thigh tightly, and my friends rushed me to Pahlavi Hospital, which was next to the University of Tabriz.

SAVAK agents stormed the hospital and arrested everyone who had been wounded. The interns there were friends of mine. They were in their sixth year when we had graduated while they were in their fourth year. They took me off the hospital bed, moved me to the morgue where the bodies were kept, and from there helped me escape on a motorcycle. They took me to the home of Engineer Reza Ayatollahi, the revolutionary head of the Sofian Cement Factory.

His wife was a physician. She told me that the bullet was lodged in my leg and would have to be removed surgically, but she had only trained in general medicine and could only administer antibiotics to prevent the wound from becoming infected. I stayed there for a while, then traveled to Tehran, and from there to Qom, where I stayed for a month at the home of Hojjat al-Islam Mohammad Al-Eshaq.

He brought a surgeon to the house, who numbed my leg with a local anesthetic, made an incision in my thigh with a scalpel, removed the bullet with forceps, placed it on a bandage, and said, 'Here is a souvenir from His Imperial Majesty Aryamehr.' He then stitched up the wound. Even today, both the bullet entry wound and the surgical scar are still visible on my leg.

During the height of the Iranian Revolution, Safavi was active in the city of Isfahan. In the early days of the revolution, he worked alongside Ali Sayad Shirazi to organize revolutionary forces in Isfahan.

In 1995, Rahim Safavi earned a Master's degree in Political Geography from Imam Hossein University. He later received a Ph.D. in Political geography from Tarbiat Modares University in 2001.

He has served as a professor of Political Geography at Kharazmi University, Shahid Beheshti University, the University of Tehran, and Tarbiat Modares University.

== Career ==
Safavi was one of the leaders of the Iran–Iraq War.

Safavi served as Commander of the IRGC Grund Forces from 1985 to 1986 and again from 1988 to 1989.

He served as the deputy commander of Islamic Revolutionary Guard Corps from 1989 until 1997 when he was appointed its commander, replacing Mohsen Rezaee in 1997.

During the US-led invasion of Afghanistan, he played a key role in the uprising in Herat in November 2001, where American, Iranian and Northern Alliance troops supported a local uprising against the Taliban.

He was replaced as commander of the IRGC by Mohammad Ali Jafari, former director of the Strategic Studies Center of the IRGC on 1 September 2007. Then he was appointed by the Supreme Leader, Ali Khamenei as his special military advisor.

== Political views ==
Safavi is a leading advocate of the Axis of Resistance, which includes Hezbollah, Hamas, and Iran-backed militias in Iraq, Syria, and Yemen. He argued that this network has already dealt strategic blows to Israel and has the potential to reshape the region's geopolitical future. According to Safavi, Israel has been "defeated by the Resistance," and he emphasizes that the liberation of Palestine will only be achieved through persistent armed struggle.

On Apr 7, 2024, Safavi opined that Hamas is an idea and an ideal that cannot be destroyed. During his speech at the 6th International Conference of Solidarity with Palestinian Youth, Safavi praised Hamas’s October 7 attacks on Israel, describing it as a "glorious" operation.

== Asset freeze ==
On 24 December 2006, Rahim Safavi was included on a list of Iranian individuals and organizations sanctioned by the United Nations Security Council Resolution 1737 due to their alleged involvement in the Iranian nuclear and ballistic missile programmes.

== Controversy regarding family members ==
On 18 February, it was reported that Australia had granted permanent residency and health qualifications to Hanieh Safavi, Yahya Rahim Safavi's daughter, drawing criticism from members of the Iranian diaspora and opposition lawmakers.

== See also ==
- List of Iranian two-star generals since 1979

Military offices
Preceded by Davoud Karimi	Commander of the Islamic Revolutionary Guard Corps in Kurdistan province 1980	Succeeded by Nasser Kazemi
Preceded by Davoud Karimi	Commander of Southern Operations Headquarters; 1981	Succeeded by Gholam Ali Rashid
New title	Commander of the IRGC Ground Forces; 17 September 1985–30 April 1986	Succeeded by Ali Shamkhani
Preceded by Gholam Ali Rashid	Deputy Commander of the IRGC Ground Forces; 1986–1989	Succeeded by Abbas Mohtaj
Preceded by Ali Shamkhani	Commander of the IRGC Ground Forces Acting; 20 September 1988–24 September 1989	Succeeded by Mostafa Izadi
Preceded by Ali Shamkhani	Deputy Commander of the Islamic Revolutionary Guard Corps; 24 September 1989–10 September 1997	Succeeded by Mohammad Bagher Zolghadr
New title	Commander of Thar-Allah Headquarters; 1995–1999	Succeeded by Hossein Nejat
Preceded by Mohsen Rezaee	Commander of the Islamic Revolutionary Guard Corps; 19 September 1997–10 September 2007	Succeeded by Mohammad Ali Jafari
New title	Senior Military Assistant and Adviser to the Commander-in-Chief of the Armed Forces; 2007–present	Incumbent
Preceded by Mohammad Nabi Roudaki	President of the Sacred Defense Sciences and Teachings Research Institute; 2019–present	Incumbent
Academic offices
Preceded by Mohammad-Reza Hafeznia	President of the Iranian Geopolitics Association; 2012–2016; 2018–2020	Succeeded by Mohammad-Hossein Papoli Yazdi
Preceded by Mohammad-Hossein Papoli Yazdi	President of the Iranian Geopolitics Association; 2012–2016; 2018–2020	Succeeded by Hadi Azami
Government offices
Preceded by Hossein Dehghan	Chairman of the Defense and Security Commission of the Strategic Council on Foreign Relations; 2023–present	Incumbent
