= Abbas Aghazamani =

Iranian military officer and diplomat (born 1939)

- عباس آقازمانی
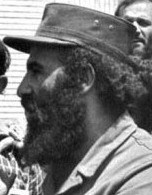
- Aghazamani at the first IRGC parade in Tehran, 1979

Iranian Ambassador to Pakistan
- In office 1981–1984
- President: Ali Khamenei
- Prime Minister: Mohammad-Reza Mahdavi Kani; Mir-Hossein Mousavi
- Supreme Leader: Ruhollah Khomeini
- Preceded by: Mir Mahmoud Mousavi
- Succeeded by: Ahmad Minaei

1st Commander-in-Chief of the Islamic Revolutionary Guard Corps
- In office 2 June 1980 – 27 June 1980
- President: Abolhassan Banisadr
- Prime Minister: Council of the Islamic Revolution
- Supreme Leader: Ruhollah Khomeini
- Preceded by: Abbas Duzduzani
- Succeeded by: Morteza Rezaee

Personal details
- Born: 1939 (age 86–87) Tehran, Pahlavi Iran
- Party: Islamic Nations Party
- Education: University of Tehran

Military service
- Allegiance: Iran
- Branch/service: IRGC
- Years of service: 1979–1981
- Battles/wars: 1979 Kurdish rebellion; Battle of Paveh; Iran–Iraq War

Abbas Aghazamani (Persian: عباس آقازمانی; born 1939), known by his nom de guerre Abu Sharif, is a retired Iranian military officer, diplomat and politician who was one of the founders of the Islamic Revolutionary Guard Corps (IRGC) and briefly served as its commander-in-chief in 1980. He was subsequently Iran's ambassador to Pakistan from 1981 to 1984.

== Early life and activism ==
Aghazamani was born in 1939 in Tehran and trained as a schoolteacher. He became politically active in the 1960s and joined the Islamic Nations Party, an underground Islamist group that sought to overthrow the Pahlavi dynasty; he was arrested by SAVAK in 1965 and imprisoned for about two years. From the late 1960s he received guerrilla training at Palestinian camps in Lebanon, where he adopted the nom de guerre "Abu Sharif" and worked with Fatah. He was a graduate in Islamic law of the University of Tehran.

In 1978 he joined the group protecting Ruhollah Khomeini during his exile at Neauphle-le-Château in France, and returned to Iran shortly before the Iranian Revolution of February 1979.

== Islamic Revolutionary Guard Corps ==
After the revolution Aghazamani helped organize the armed revolutionary forces that were merged in 1979 to form the Islamic Revolutionary Guard Corps. He became a member of its command council and its first operations commander, and is regarded as the corps' "first official operational commander". Appointed commander-in-chief by President Abolhassan Banisadr and confirmed by Khomeini, he held the post briefly in June 1980 before resigning after disagreements with Banisadr; he was succeeded by Morteza Rezaee. During the early Iran–Iraq War he served as a commander on Iran's western front.

== Later life ==
In 1981 Khomeini appointed Aghazamani as Iran's ambassador to Pakistan, a post he held until 1984. He later pursued religious studies at the Qom Seminary and spent extended periods in Afghanistan and Pakistan, where he engaged in religious activities. As of the 2020s he resides in Pakistan.

Military offices
Preceded by Abbas Duzduzani; Acting	Commander of the Islamic Revolutionary Guard Corps; 2 June 1980–27 June 1980	Succeeded by Morteza Rezaee
Diplomatic posts
Preceded by Mir Mahmoud Mousavi	Iranian Ambassador to Pakistan; 1981–1984	Succeeded by Ahmad Minaei
