= Mohammad Bagher Zolghadr =

Iranian politician and military commander (born 1954)

Sardar Mohammad Bagher Zolghadr
- محمدباقر ذوالقدر
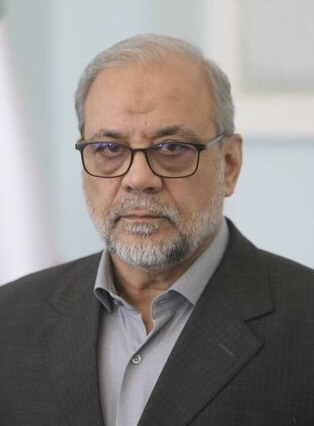
- Zolghadr in 2023

7th Secretary of the Supreme National Security Council
- In office 24 March 2026 – 9 August 2026
- Appointed by: Masoud Pezeshkian
- President: Masoud Pezeshkian
- Supreme Leader: Mojtaba Khamenei
- Preceded by: Ali Larijani
- Succeeded by: Mohsen Rezaei

Member of Expediency Discernment Council
- Incumbent
- Assumed office 20 September 2022
- Appointed by: Ali Khamenei
- President: Ebrahim Raisi; Mohammad Mokhber (acting); Masoud Pezeshkian
- Supreme Leader: Ali Khamenei; Mojtaba Khamenei
- Chairman: Sadiq Larijani

Secretary of the Expediency Discernment Council
- In office 19 September 2021 – 9 May 2026
- Appointed by: Sadiq Larijani
- President: Ebrahim Raisi; Mohammad Mokhber (acting); Masoud Pezeshkian
- Supreme Leader: Ali Khamenei; Mojtaba Khamenei
- Chairman: Sadiq Larijani
- Preceded by: Mohsen Rezaee
- Succeeded by: Abbas-Ali Kadkhodaei
Other posts held
Deputy Judiciary Chief for Strategic Affairs
In office 13 May 2012 – 19 September 2021
President	Mahmoud Ahmadinejad; Hassan Rouhani; Ebrahim Raisi; Mohammad Mokhber (acting); Masoud Pezeshkian
Supreme Leader	Ali Khamenei
Preceded by	Office Established
Succeeded by	Mohammad Sahebkar Khorasani
Social Deputy and Head of Crime Prevention of the Judiciary
In office 2010–2012
President	Mahmoud Ahmadinejad
Supreme Leader	Ali Khamenei
Preceded by	?
Succeeded by	Seyed Alireza Sadra Hosseini
Head of Election Headquarters of Popular Front of Islamic Revolution Forces
In office 2016–2017
President	Hassan Rouhani
Supreme Leader	Ali Khamenei
Preceded by	Office Established
Succeeded by	Vacant
Deputy Minister of Interior for Security Affairs
In office 23 November 2005 – 6 December 2007
President	Mahmoud Ahmadinejad
Supreme Leader	Ali Khamenei
Preceded by	Ali-Asghar Ahmadi
Succeeded by	Abbas Mohtaj
Deputy Minister of Interior
In office 23 November 2005 – 6 December 2007
President	Mahmoud Ahmadinejad
Supreme Leader	Ali Khamenei
Deputy for Basij Affairs of the General Staff of the Armed Forces
In office 2007–2009
President	Mahmoud Ahmadinejad
Supreme Leader	Ali Khamenei
Preceded by	Office Established
Succeeded by	Akbar Ebrahimzadeh
Deputy Commander of the Islamic Revolutionary Guard Corps
In office 13 September 1997 – 30 April 2006
President	Akbar Hashemi Rafsanjani; Mohammad Khatami; Mahmoud Ahmadinejad
Supreme Leader	Ali Khamenei
Preceded by	Yahya Rahim Safavi
Succeeded by	Morteza Rezaee
Chief of Joint Staff of IRGC
In office 1989–1997
President	Akbar Hashemi Rafsanjani
Supreme Leader	Ali Khamenei
Preceded by	Mohammad Forouzandeh
Succeeded by	Hossein Alaei
Commander of Ramadan Headquarters
In office 1985–1988
President	Ali Khamenei
Prime Minister	Mir-Hossein Mousavi
Supreme Leader	Ruhollah Khomeini
Preceded by	Morteza Rezaee
Succeeded by	Ahmad Kazemi

Personal details
- Born: c. 1954 or 1955 (age 70–71) Fasa, Fars province, Pahlavi Iran
- Party: Popular Front of Islamic Revolution Forces
- Other political affiliations: Ansar-e Hezbollah (1991–1995); Mojahedin of the Islamic Revolution Organization (1979–1986)
- Relations: Kazem Gharibabadi (son-in-law)
- Education: University of Tehran (BEc)

Military service
- Allegiance: Iran
- Branch/service: IRGC
- Years of service: 1979–2010
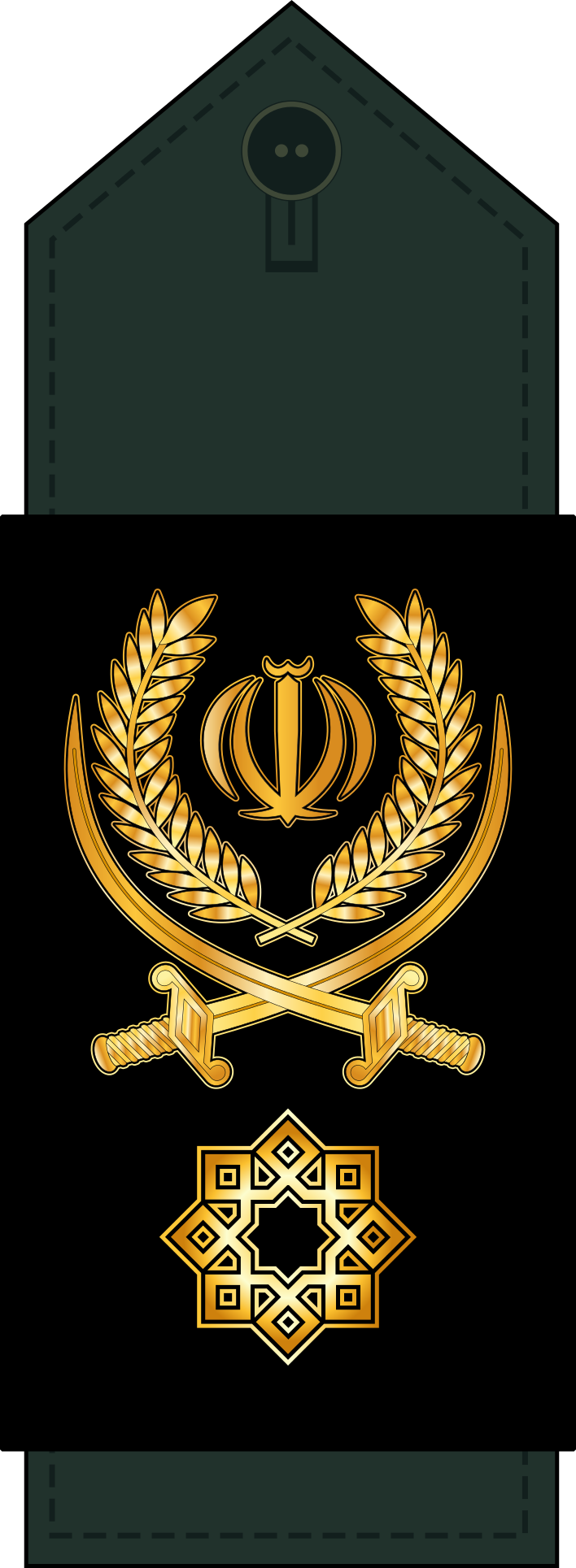
- Rank: Brigadier General
- Battles/wars: Iran–Iraq War

Mohammad Bagher Zolghadr (Note: Persian: محمد‌باقر ذوالقدر, romanized: Mohammad Bâğer Zolqadr) (born 1954) is an Iranian politician and former military officer who serves as a political advisor to the Supreme Leader of Iran. He previously served as secretary of the Supreme National Security Council from March to August 2026 and as secretary of the Expediency Discernment Council from 2021 to 2026.

Before the 1979 Islamic revolution, Zolghadr was active in carrying out attacks against the monarchy, and in 1978 he killed an American engineer and an oil company manager. He served as the commander of the IRGC Irregular Warfare Headquarters, as well as the Ramazan Headquarters, which formed the basis for the Quds Force, the IRGC’s foreign branch that conducts asymmetric warfare outside of Iran. He was later a Brigadier General in the IRGC, with whom he served from 1979 to 2010. He was the Chief of the Joint Staff of the IRGC from 1989 to 1997, and Second-in-Command of the IRGC from 1997 to 2006.

After he helped Mahmoud Ahmadinejad come to power with a "multilayered plan," from 2005 to 2007 he was Deputy Interior Minister for Security Affairs and Police under Ahmadinejad. From 2012 to 2021 he was the deputy for strategic, societal–security and crime prevention affairs in the judicial system of Iran. In March 2026, he was appointed Secretary of the Supreme National Security Council, succeeding Ali Larijani, who was assassinated by an Israeli airstrike during the war.

He is known for his hard-line views, and said on 24 March 2026 that the IRGC should gain more control over the country. The Economist described him as an "IRGC apparatchik".

== Early life and education ==
Mohammad Bagher Zolghadr was born in 1954 in Fasa, near Shiraz, Iran. He obtained a bachelor’s degree in economics from the Faculty of Economics at the University of Tehran, prior to Iran's 1979 Islamic revolution.

== Military career ==
Before the 1979 Islamic revolution, he was a member of the Mansourun guerrilla group, an Islamist militant organization active at the time. In 1978 he, along with Mohsen Rezaei, killed an American engineer and an oil company manager. He is reportedly one of the founders of Ansar-e Hezbollah, a conservative paramilitary organization in Iran.

During the Iran–Iraq War, he co-headed the Islamic Revolutionary Guard Corps' educational division for military training, as well as guerrilla operations. He later served as the commander of the IRGC Irregular Warfare Headquarters, as well as the Ramazan Headquarters, which formed the basis for the Quds Force, the IRGC’s foreign branch that conducts asymmetric warfare outside of Iran.

He was the Chief of the Joint Staff of the IRGC from 1989 to 1997. Zolghadr served as the deputy commander of the IRGC from 1997 to 2005. In 2007, Zolghadr was appointed the deputy chief of the General Staff of the Iranian Armed Forces for Basij-related affairs.

== Political career ==
Following the Iranian Revolution, Zolghadr joined the Mojahedin of the Islamic Revolution Organization and belonged to its right-wing faction, having previously been a member of Mansouroun guerrilla organization along with later fellow IRGC servicemen Rezaei, Shamkhani and Rashid.

After he helped Mahmoud Ahmadinejad come to power with a "multilayered plan," from 2005 to 2007 he was Deputy Interior Minister for Security Affairs and Police under Ahmadinejad. In April 2007, he warned the U.S. that if it were to attack Iran, Iran would fire “tens of thousands of missiles at American targets every day."

Beginning in 2021, Zolghadr led Iran’s Expediency Discernment Council. The council advises Iran’s Supreme Leader.

In March 2026, he was appointed Secretary of the Supreme National Security Council, succeeding Ali Larijani, who had been killed. In August 2026, he resigned from his post and was replaced by Mohsen Rezaei, an advisor for Supreme Leader Mojtaba Khamenei.

== Judicial career ==
In 2010, Zolghadr began serving as an advisor to the Chief Justice Sadiq Larijani, the brother of Ali Larijani. He was appointed the deputy Judiciary chief for strategic affairs on 14 May 2012.

== Personal life ==
Zolghadr is married to Sedigheh Begum Hejazi, who has served as Director-General of the Office of Women and Family Affairs at the Organization of Islamic Culture and Communication. His son-in-law, Kazem Gharibabadi, is an Iranian diplomat who has represented Iran in Vienna at international organizations, including the International Atomic Energy Agency.

== Published works ==
Zolghadr authored Qesse-ye Ghorbat-e Gharbi (Persian: قصه‌ی غربت غربی; English: The Tale of Western Estrangement), published in 1381 (2002–2003) in Iran by Dowrye Aliye Jang. The work, written in Persian, is a short volume (38 pages) that engages with themes related to Western society and culture, framed through a critical and ideological lens.

== See also ==
- List of Iranian officials

== Notes ==
Party political offices
New title Organization established	Head of Election Headquarters of Popular Front of Islamic Revolution Forces; 2016–2017	Vacant
Legal offices
New title	Deputy Judiciary Chief for Strategic Affairs; 13 May 2012 – 19 September 2021	Succeeded by Mohammad Sahebkar Khorasani
Preceded by ?	Social Deputy and Head of Crime Prevention of the Judiciary; 2010 – 2012	Succeeded by Seyed Alireza Sadra Hosseini
Military offices
New title	Deputy for Basij Affairs of the General Staff of the Armed Forces; 2007 – 2009	Succeeded by Akbar Ebrahimzadeh
Preceded by Yahya Rahim Safavi	Deputy Commander of the Islamic Revolutionary Guard Corps; 13 September 1997 – 30 April 2006	Succeeded by Morteza Rezaee
Preceded by Mohammad Forouzandeh as Chief of the General Staff	Chief of Joint Staff of IRGC; 22 September 1989 – 13 September 1997	Succeeded by Morteza Rezaee
Preceded by Morteza Rezaee	Commander of Ramadan Headquarters; 1985 – 1988	Succeeded by Ahmad Kazemi
Government offices
Preceded by Ali-Asghar Ahmadi	Deputy Interior Minister for Security Affairs; 23 November 2005 – 6 December 2007	Succeeded by Abbas Mohtaj
Political offices
Preceded by Mohsen Rezaee	Secretary of the Expediency Discernment Council; 19 September 2021–9 May 2026	Succeeded by Abbas-Ali Kadkhodaei
Preceded by Ali Larijani	Secretary of the Supreme National Security Council; 24 March 2026–9 August 2026	Succeeded by Mohsen Rezaei
