= Karbala Headquarters =

- قرارگاه کربلا
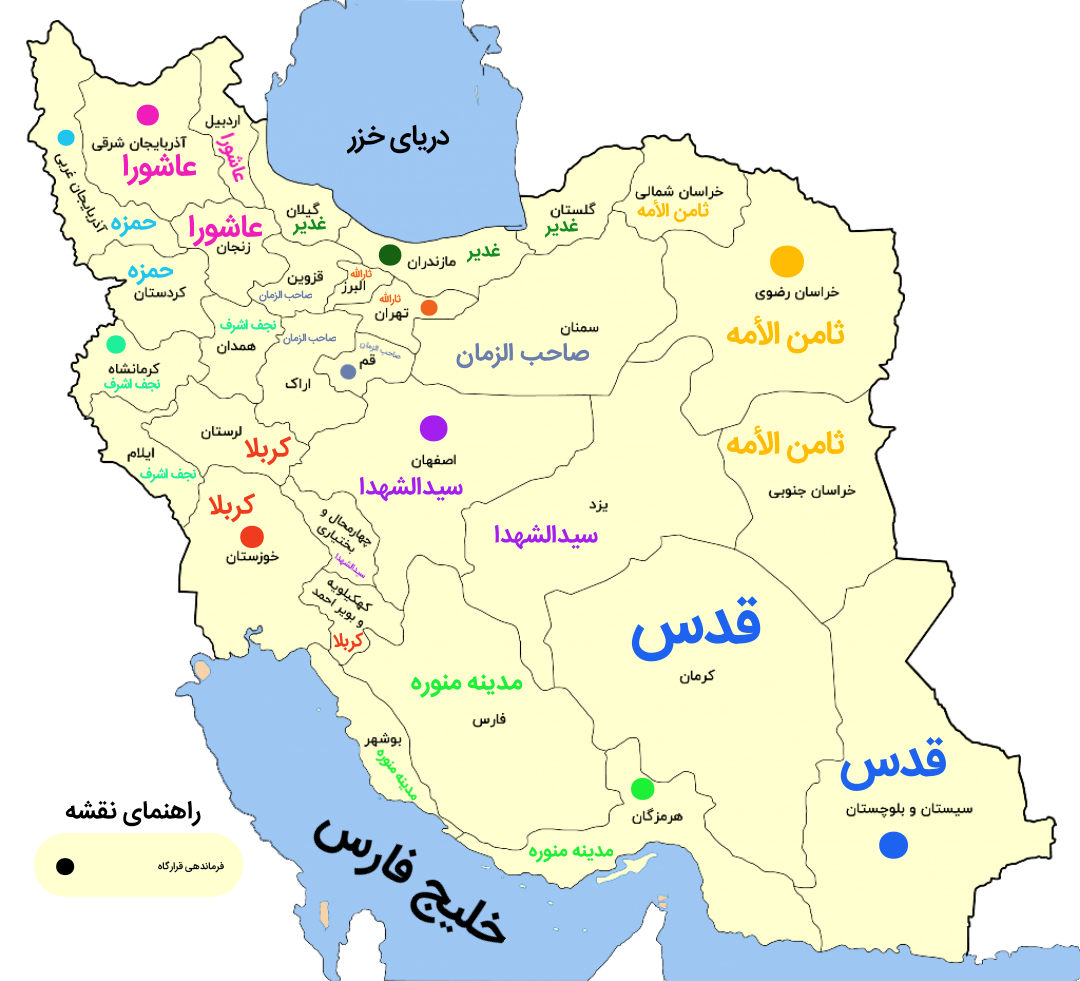
- Islamic Revolutionary Guards Ground Force Headquarters
- Country: Iran
- Branch: Iranian Armed Forces
- Type: Provincial Headquarters of the Islamic Revolutionary Guard Corps
- Size: Headquarters
- Garrison/HQ: Ahvaz, Khuzestan province

Commanders
- Current commander: IRGC Brigadier General Ahmad Khadem Seyyed al-Shohada

The Karbala Headquarters is one of the ten main commands of the IRGC Ground Forces, led by Ahmad Khadem Seyyed al-Shohada. It operates in southwestern Iran and is the oldest IRGC ground forces headquarters, established in 1981 during the early years of the Iran–Iraq War. The Karbala Headquarters oversees the Vali-e-Asr Khuzestan, Abolfazl Lorestan, and Fath Kohgiluyeh and Boyer-Ahmad provincial corps. Key combat units under its command include the 7th Vali-e-Asr Armored Division, the 15th Imam Hassan Behbahan Brigade, the 51st Hazrat Hojjat Ahvaz Armored Brigade, the 64th Artillery and Missile Group, the Hazrat Mahdi Andimeshk Ranger Brigade, the 57th Lorestan Brigade, and the 48th Fath Kohgiluyeh and Boyer-Ahmad Brigade. The headquarters is based at the Golf Barracks in Ahvaz. During the Twelve-Day War, on June 20–21, 2025, the Karbala base was struck several times by Israeli Air Force missile attacks.

== History ==
The Karbala Headquarters was the first operational command center of the Islamic Revolutionary Guard Corps (IRGC), established in 1981 during the early stages of the Iran–Iraq War to coordinate the IRGC’s combat units on the battlefield. Initially, it served as the senior headquarters responsible for coordinating joint operations involving the IRGC, the Iranian Army, and Jihad-e-Sazandegi. Following the creation of the Khatam al-Anbiya Central Headquarters during the Khyber Operation, overall operational command was transferred to the new Khatam base. The Karbala Headquarters then assumed tactical command of the army’s ground forces, while IRGC combat units were reorganized under the Najaf Headquarters. After the Khyber Operation, both the Karbala and Najaf Headquarters were integrated under the Khatam al-Anbiya Central Headquarters, each functioning at a level above division command (operational corps).

The South Karbala Regional Headquarters, also known as the Shahadat (Golf) Base, is located on Shahid Modarres Boulevard in Ahvaz, near the Ramhormoz Road. Before the 1979 Iranian Revolution, the site was a golf club owned by the National Iranian Oil Company, used primarily by employees from southern oil-producing regions and American expatriates. After the revolution, oil company employees briefly occupied the complex to protect nearby oil facilities. Responsibility for this protection was later transferred to the Revolutionary Guards, who converted the former golf club into a military base. With the outbreak of the Iran–Iraq War, the base’s discreet location, proximity to Ahvaz Airport, and natural protection from surrounding terrain made it an ideal command site. It was designated the “Waiting for Martyrs” (Shahadat) Base, serving as the central command and operations hub for IRGC forces in southern Iran—from Dehloran to Ras al-Bisheh.

During the war, the base became a center for strategic planning and coordination. A war room was established to manage intelligence, operations, and troop movements, and it frequently hosted senior officials of the Islamic Republic. Davud Karimi commanded the base during the first six months of the war. Seyyed Yahya Safavi succeeded him for the next six months. From the second year onward, Gholam Ali Rashid served as commander, with Hassan Bagheri as his deputy. Every Wednesday, commanders from the IRGC’s southern operational fronts would meet at the base to share intelligence and discuss war strategies. The first intelligence and operations reports of the conflict—compiled by Hassan Bagheri, who headed the IRGC’s intelligence and operations in the south—were produced here. These reports played a crucial role in shaping the IRGC’s evolving military strategy during the war. Today, the Karbala Headquarters remains one of the ten IRGC Ground Forces regional commands. It oversees the IRGC’s ground operations in the provinces of Khuzestan, Lorestan, Kohgiluyeh, and Boyer-Ahmad, maintaining its historical role as a key center for command and control in southwestern Iran.

== Commanders ==
- Davod Karimi
- Seyyed Yahya Safavi
- Gholam Ali Rashid
- Seyyed Morteza Mortezaei
- Gholamhossein Bashardoost
- Abdolmajid Baghaei
- Ahmad Gholampour
- Amin Shariati
- Mohammad Nabi Rudaki
- Yazdan Moayedinia
- Rahim Noei Aghdam
- Mohsen Kazemeini
- Ahmad Khadem Seyyed al-Shohada

== Israeli attack ==
In the early days of the Twelve-Day War, heavy fighting reached the city of Ahvaz. A nighttime defensive clash that had begun in the western parts of the city spread eastward on June 20 and 21, 2025, during which the command headquarters of the Karbala Base came under multiple Israeli Air Force missile attacks. On the evening of Friday, June 20, at around 3:00 p.m., powerful explosions hit the nearby neighborhoods of Ramadan, Sultan Manesh, Naft, and Koy Niroo—the areas surrounding the Karbala Base headquarters and barracks—following the airstrikes on the facility.
