= List of commanders of the Islamic Revolutionary Guard Corps =

The following individuals have been identified as commanding officers (currently or in the past) of the Islamic Revolutionary Guard Corps (IRGC), which is a branch of the Iranian Armed Forces.

== Commanders-in-chief ==
Javad Mansouri was IRGC's "first unofficial commander" and acting during its "early formative phase". Abbas Aghazamani, however, is considered the "first official operational commander" and was appointed by the commander-in-chief.

No.	Portrait	Commander-in-Chief	Took office	Left office	Time in office	Ref.
–	Javad Mansouri [fa]	Javad Mansouri; Acting	March 1979	May 1979	3 months	
–	Mostafa Chamran	Mostafa Chamran (1932–1981); Acting	Summer 1979	Summer 1979	de facto officeholder	
–	Akbar Hashemi Rafsanjani	Akbar Hashemi Rafsanjani (1934–2017); Acting	August 1979	August 1979	less than a month	
–	Hassan Lahouti [fa]	Hassan Lahouti; Acting	October 1979	November 1979	2 months	
–	Fereydoun Kian	Lieutenant colonel Fereydoun Kian; Acting	late 1979	late 1979	Unknown	
–	Ali Khamenei	Ali Khamenei (1939–2026); Acting	24 November 1979	24 February 1980	92 days	
–	Abbas Duzduzani	Abbas Duzduzani (1942–2018); Acting	1980	1980	Unknown	
1	Abbas Aghazamani	Abbas Aghazamani (born 1939)	2 June 1980	27 June 1980	25 days	
2	Morteza Rezaee	Morteza Rezaee	22 July 1980	20 September 1981	1 year, 60 days	
3	Mohsen Rezaee	Major general Mohsen Rezaee (born 1954)	20 September 1981	19 September 1997	15 years, 364 days	
4	Yahya Rahim Safavi	Major general Yahya Rahim Safavi (born 1952)	19 September 1997	10 September 2007	9 years, 356 days	
5	Mohammad Ali Jafari	Major general Mohammad Ali Jafari (born 1957)	10 September 2007	21 April 2019	11 years, 223 days	
6	Hossein Salami	Major general Hossein Salami (1960–2025)	21 April 2019	13 June 2025 X	6 years, 53 days	
–	Ahmad Vahidi	Brigadier general Ahmad Vahidi (born 1958); Acting	13 June 2025	13 June 2025	0 days	
7	Mohammad Pakpour	Major general Mohammad Pakpour (1961–2026)	13 June 2025	28 February 2026 X	260 days	
8	Ahmad Vahidi	Major general Ahmad Vahidi (born 1958)	1 March 2026	Incumbent	238 days	

== Deputy commanders-in-chief ==
No.	Portrait	Deputy Commander-in-Chief	Took office	Left office	Time in office	Ref.
1	Yousef Kolahdouz	Major; Yousef Kolahdouz (1946–1981)	July 1980	29 September 1981	1 year, 90 days	
2	Ali Shamkhani	Ali Shamkhani (1955–2026)	June 1982	24 September 1989	7 years, 115 days	
3	Yahya Rahim Safavi	Yahya Rahim Safavi (born 1952)	24 September 1989	10 September 1997	7 years, 351 days	–
4	Mohammad Bagher Zolghadr	Brigadier general Mohammad Bagher Zolghadr (born c. 1954/1955)	13 September 1997	30 April 2006	8 years, 229 days	–
5	Morteza Rezaee	Brigadier general Morteza Rezaee	30 April 2006	22 May 2008	2 years, 22 days	–
6	Mohammad Hejazi	Brigadier general Mohammad Hejazi (1956–2021)	22 May 2008	4 October 2009	1 year, 135 days	–
7	Hossein Salami	Brigadier general Hossein Salami (1960–2025)	4 October 2009	21 April 2019	9 years, 199 days	–
8	Ali Fadavi	Commodore; Ali Fadavi (born 1961)	16 May 2019	27 December 2025	6 years, 225 days	–
9	Ahmad Vahidi	Brigadier general Ahmad Vahidi (born 1958)	27 December 2025	1 March 2026	64 days	
10	Mostafa Izadi	Major general Mostafa Izadi (born 1956)	10 August 2025	Incumbent	76 days	

== Supreme Leader Representatives ==
No.	Portrait	Representative	Took office	Left office	Time in office	Ref.
1	Hassan Lahouti [fa]	Hassan Lahouti (1927–1981)	1979	1979	0 years	–
2	Fazlollah Mahallati [fa]	Fazlollah Mahallati (1930–1986)	1980	1981	0–1 years	–
3	Hassan Taheri-Khorramabadi [fa]	Hassan Taheri-Khorramabadi	1981	1982	0–1 years	–
4	Mohammad-Reza Faker [fa]	Mohammad-Reza Faker	1982	1983	0–1 years	–
(2)	Fazlollah Mahallati [fa]	Fazlollah Mahallati (1930–1986)	1983	20 February 1986 †	2–3 years	–
5	Abdollah Nouri	Abdollah Nouri (born 1950)	1989	1990	0–1 years	–
6	Mahmoud Mohammadi-Araghi [fa]	Mahmoud Mohammadi-Araghi	1990	1991	0–1 years	–
7	Mohammad-Ali Movahedi Kermani	Mohammad-Ali Movahedi Kermani (born 1932)	1991	2006	14–15 years	–
8	Ali Saeedi Shahroudi [fa]	Ali Saeedi Shahroudi	2006	2018	11–12 years	–
9	Abdollah Haji Sadeghi [fa]	Abdollah Haji Sadeghi	2018	Incumbent	7–8 years	–

== See also ==
- List of Chiefs of Staff of the Islamic Republic of Iran Army
