= Kazem Gharibabadi =

Iranian diplomat and writer

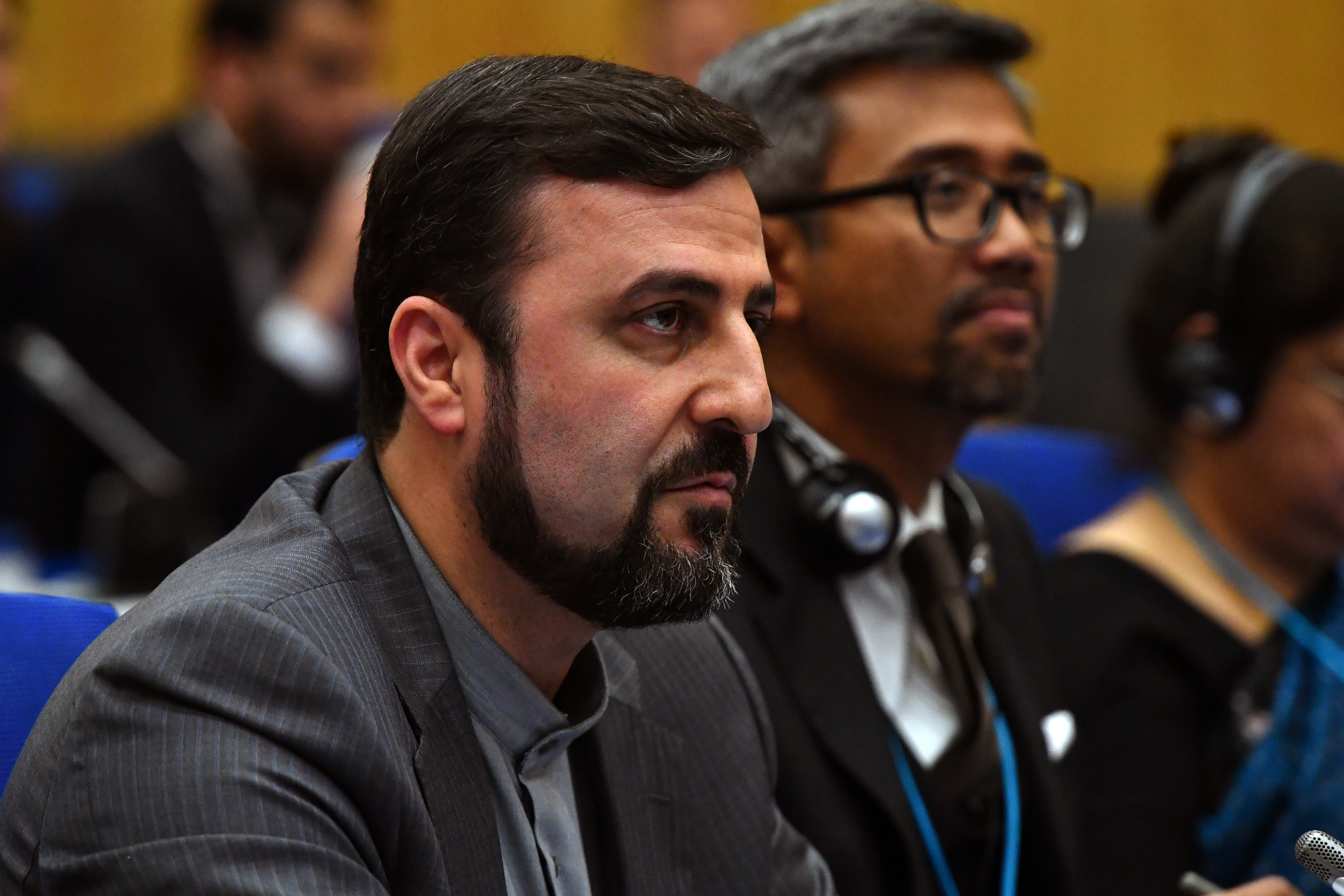
Kazem Gharibabadi in 2019

Kazem Gharibabadi (Persian: کاظم غریب‌آبادی; born 1974) is an Iranian diplomat and legal expert, who has served as his country's Deputy Foreign Minister for Legal and International Affairs since September 2024. He has previously held a number of senior roles in Iran's legal and diplomatic institutions, including as a key representative in discussions concerning Iran's nuclear program.

== Biography ==
=== Education ===
Gharibabadi holds an MA in diplomacy and international organizations and a PhD in public law, both from Allameh Tabataba'i University.

=== Career (1996–2024) ===
From 1996 Gharibabadi held a number of positions relating to foreign affairs, including within the Ministry of Defence and the Supreme National Security Council. He joined the Ministry of Foreign Affairs in 2005, when he was appointed Secretary of Iran's Nuclear Diplomacy Task Force and advisor to the foreign minister on nuclear affairs. Between 2009 and 2013 Gharibabadi served as Iran's Ambassador to the Netherlands, and as Iran's permanent representative to various international organizations based in The Hague. From 2014 he held several roles within the High Council for Human Rights, playing a key role in advocating for Iran's human rights positions on the international stage.

From 2015, Gharibabadi served as Secretary of the Joint Comprehensive Plan of Action (JCPOA) Committee within the Supreme National Security Council. He remained active within Iran's nuclear diplomacy with his appointment as ambassador and permanent representative to various international organizations in Vienna, including the International Atomic Energy Agency (IAEA), in July 2018. In early 2021 Gharibabadi accompanied foreign minister Abbas Araghchi to talks in Vienna aimed at reviving the Joint Comprehensive Plan of Action. After these attempts stalled, Gharibabadi criticized the draft agreement negotiated by Araghchi in an interview with supreme leader Ali Khamenei's website.

After leaving this position in October 2020 Gharibabadi held various high roles within the Iranian Judiciary, including as Vice-President, and was appointed Secretary of the High Council for Human Rights. In these roles, he set out to defend the Iranian government's crackdown against the Mahsa Amini protests in 2022 from international criticism, including at meetings of the United Nations Human Rights Council.

Gharibabadi appeared alongside Mohammad Bagher Ghalibaf during the latter's presidential campaign ahead of the 2024 election, giving rise to rumors of Gharibabadi as a potential foreign minister under Ghalibaf.

=== Deputy Foreign Minister (since 2024) ===
Gharibabadi was appointed Deputy Foreign Minister for Legal and International Affairs in September 2024, making him one of the top negotiators within Iran's nuclear diplomacy. In December 2024, he met with Chinese Vice Foreign Minister Ma Zhaoxu in Beijing to discuss bilateral relations and Iran's nuclear program. On 1 January 2025, he stated that Iran would hold a round of nuclear talks with Britain, Germany and France in Geneva, Switzerland, on January 13 of that year.

In April 2025, during Iran–United States negotiations held in Oman, Gharibabadi was accused on online social media of accidentally placing a gold-plated pen provided by the Omani administration in his pocket. The Iranian ambassador to Oman, Musa Farhang, denied the claim. Reports seen by Iran International suggested that the pen was valued at US$14,000, that Gharibabadi's action had been recorded on video, and that he returned the pen.

== Personal life ==
Gharibabadi is the son-in-law of Mohammad Bagher Zolghadr, a former Islamic Revolutionary Guard Corps general serving as secretary of the Supreme National Security Council since 2026.

== Legal case ==
In late February 2026, a universal jurisdiction case was filed in Switzerland against Gharibabadi for crimes against humanity during the Iranian government crackdown against the Mahsa Amini protests. Lawyers William Bourdon and Philippine Vaganay called for Gharibabadi to be arrested if he visited Switzerland.
