= Supreme National Security Council =

Iranian governmental body (1989–present)

Coordinates: 35.7840°N 51.5308°E

Supreme National Security Council شورای عالی امنیت ملی
- Established: 1989

Leadership
- Chairman: President of Iran, Masoud Pezeshkian since 28 July 2024
- Secretary: Mohsen Rezaei since 9 August 2026
- Seats: 13

Meeting place
- Tehran, Iran

The Supreme National Security Council (SNSC; Persian: شورای عالی امنیت ملی, romanized: Showrā-ye Āli-ye Amniyat-e Mellī), also known as the Supreme Council for National Security, is the national security council of the Islamic Republic of Iran. The council was formed for the protection and support of national interests and Islamic revolution and territorial integrity and national sovereignty of the country. This institution was founded during the 1989 revision of the constitution.

Ali Larijani, secretary of the Supreme National Security Council, was assassinated on 17 March 2026. He was succeeded on 24 March by Mohammad Bagher Zolghadr, then secretary of the Expediency Discernment Council. Zolghadr remained in office until 9 August 2026, when he was succeeded by the current secretary, Mohsen Rezaee.

The Secretary of the Supreme National Security Council is appointed by the President of Iran, currently Masoud Pezeshkian, by presidential decree.

== Functions ==
The responsibilities of the council are defined by the constitution as:

1. Determining the defense and national security policies of the country within the framework of general policies determined by the Supreme Leader.
2. Coordination of political activities, intelligence, social, cultural and economic fields relating to general policies of defense and national security.
3. Exploitation of material and intellectual resources of the country for facing the internal and external threats.

=== Nuclear policy ===
Supreme National Security Council formulates the country's nuclear policy. The nuclear policies formulated by the council would become effective if they are confirmed by the Supreme Leader. The secretary of the Supreme council was the chief nuclear negotiator of Iran until 5 September 2013 when responsibility for nuclear talks was assigned to the ministry of foreign affairs.

== Composition ==
This National Security Council is mandated by Article 176 of the Constitution of the Islamic Republic of Iran to be presided over by the president of the country. The President appoints the Secretary of the Supreme National Security Council through an official decree. The decisions of the Council are effective after the confirmation by the Supreme Leader. Supreme Leader Mojtaba Khamenei and the Supreme National Security Council (SNSC) are at the top of the foreign policy decisions process.

== List of secretaries ==
№	Secretary		Tenure		Political position	Appointed by President	Supreme Leader
№	Name	Picture	Took office	Left office	Political position	Appointed by President	Supreme Leader
1	Hassan Rouhani		12 October 1989	15 August 2005	Pragmatist	Akbar Hashemi Rafsanjani	Ali Khamenei
1	Hassan Rouhani		12 October 1989	15 August 2005	Pragmatist	Mohammad Khatami	Ali Khamenei
2	Ali Larijani		15 August 2005	20 October 2007	Principlist	Mahmoud Ahmadinejad	Ali Khamenei
3	Saeed Jalili		20 October 2007	10 September 2013	Principlist	Mahmoud Ahmadinejad	Ali Khamenei
4	Ali Shamkhani		10 September 2013	22 May 2023	IRGC	Hassan Rouhani	Ali Khamenei
4	Ali Shamkhani		10 September 2013	22 May 2023	IRGC	Ebrahim Raisi	Ali Khamenei
5	Ali Akbar Ahmadian		22 May 2023	5 August 2025	IRGC	Ebrahim Raisi	Ali Khamenei
5	Ali Akbar Ahmadian		22 May 2023	5 August 2025	IRGC	Masoud Pezeshkian	Ali Khamenei
6	Ali Larijani		5 August 2025	17 March 2026	Principlist	Masoud Pezeshkian	Ali Khamenei
7	Mohammad Bagher Zolghadr		24 March 2026	9 August 2026	Principlist	Masoud Pezeshkian	Mojtaba Khamenei
8	Mohsen Rezaei		9 August 2026	Incumbent	Principlist	Masoud Pezeshkian	Mojtaba Khamenei

== Members ==
As of 10 August 2026, following members are:

#	Appointer	Ex officio member	Current officeholder	Position in the Supreme Council
1	Popular election	President	Masoud Pezeshkian	Chairman
2	Indirect election	Speaker of the Parliament	Mohammad Bagher Ghalibaf	Member
3	Supreme Leader	Chief Justice	Gholam-Hossein Mohseni-Eje'i	Member
4	Supreme Leader	Representative of the Supreme Leader of Iran	MG Mohsen Rezaei	Member and Secretary (Note: Secretary of the Council is appointed by the President. Secretary has voting rights only if he is also a member of the Council.)
5	Supreme Leader	Representative of the Supreme Leader of Iran	Saeed Jalili	Member
6	Supreme Leader	Chief of the General Staff	MG Ali Abdollahi	Member
7	Supreme Leader	Chief of the Army	MG Amir Hatami	Temporary Member (Note: Temporary members have voting rights only if the subject under debate in the Council is relevant.)
8	Supreme Leader	Chief of the Islamic Revolutionary Guard Corps	MG Ahmad Vahidi	Temporary Member
9	President	Minister of Foreign Affairs	Abbas Araghchi	Member
10	President	Minister of the Interior	BG Eskandar Momeni	Member
11	President	Minister of Intelligence	Vacant (since March 18, 2026)	Member
12	President	Head of Plan and Budget Organization	Hamid Pourmohammadi	Member
13	President	Minister related with the Subject of Agenda of the Council	Other Cabinet Ministers	Temporary Member

== See also ==
- Politics of Iran
- History of the Islamic Republic of Iran
