= Mohsen Rezaei =

Iranian politician and senior military officer (born 1954)

Sardar Mohsen Rezaei
- محسن رضایی
- Rezaei in 2026

8th Secretary of the Supreme National Security Council
- Incumbent
- Assumed office 9 August 2026
- President: Masoud Pezeshkian
- Supreme Leader: Mojtaba Khamenei
- Preceded by: Mohammad Bagher Zolghadr

Member of Expediency Discernment Council
- Incumbent
- Assumed office 9 September 1997
- Appointed by: Ali Khamenei
- Chairman: Akbar Hashemi Rafsanjani; Ali Movahedi-Kermani (Acting); Mahmoud Hashemi Shahroudi; Sadeq Larijani

Vice President of Iran for Economic Affairs
- In office 25 August 2021 – 11 June 2023
- President: Ebrahim Raisi
- Preceded by: Mohammad Nahavandian
- Succeeded by: vacant

Secretary of the Expediency Discernment Council
- In office 9 September 1997 – 19 September 2021
- Appointed by: Akbar Hashemi Rafsanjani
- Chairman: Akbar Hashemi Rafsanjani; Ali Movahedi-Kermani (Acting); Mahmoud Hashemi Shahroudi; Sadeq Larijani
- Preceded by: Hassan Habibi
- Succeeded by: Mohammad Bagher Zolghadr

Secretary of the Supreme Council for Economic Coordination
- Incumbent
- Assumed office 2021
- Preceded by: Mohammad Nahavandian

Publisher of Mellat-e Ma Newspaper
- In office 2009–2010
- Preceded by: Office Established
- Succeeded by: Abdolhossein Rouhalamini

Chairman of the Board of Directors of the Supreme Assembly of Iranian Elites
- In office 2007–2013
- Preceded by: Office Established
- Succeeded by: Azar Heydarian Kermanshahi

Chairman of the Economic, Commercial, and Administrative Committee of the Expediency Discernment Council
- Incumbent
- Assumed office 1997
- Preceded by: Office Established

3rd Commander-in-Chief of the Islamic Revolutionary Guard Corps
- In office 20 September 1981 – 19 September 1997
- President: Ali Khamenei; Akbar Hashemi Rafsanjani; Mohammad Khatami
- Prime Minister: Mohammad-Reza Mahdavi Kani; Mir-Hossein Mousavi
- Supreme Leader: Ruhollah Khomeini; Ali Khamenei
- Preceded by: Morteza Rezaee
- Succeeded by: Yahya Rahim Safavi

Head of the IRGC Intelligence Department
- In office June 1979 – September 1981
- President: Abolhassan Banisadr
- Prime Minister: Mehdi Bazargan; Mohammad-Ali Rajai; Mohammad-Javad Bahonar; Mohammad-Reza Mahdavi Kani
- Supreme Leader: Ruhollah Khomeini
- Preceded by: Ali Mohammad Besharati
- Succeeded by: Vahid Naseri

Personal details
- Born: Sabzevar Rezaei Mirgha'ed; 9 September 1954 (age 72) Masjed Soleyman, Khuzestan province, Imperial State of Iran
- Party: Resistance Front of Islamic Iran (Spiritual leader)
- Other political affiliations: Mojahedin of the Islamic Revolution Organization (1979–1980)
- Spouse: Masoumeh Khadang (m. 1974)
- Children: 5, including Ahmad
- Education: Iran University of Science and Technology (did not graduate); University of Tehran
- Awards: Order of Fath (1st class) (3 times)
- Website: rezaee.ir
- Nickname: Haj Mohsen

Military service
- Allegiance: Iran
- Branch/service: Islamic Revolutionary Guard Corps
- Years of service: 1980–1997; 2015–present
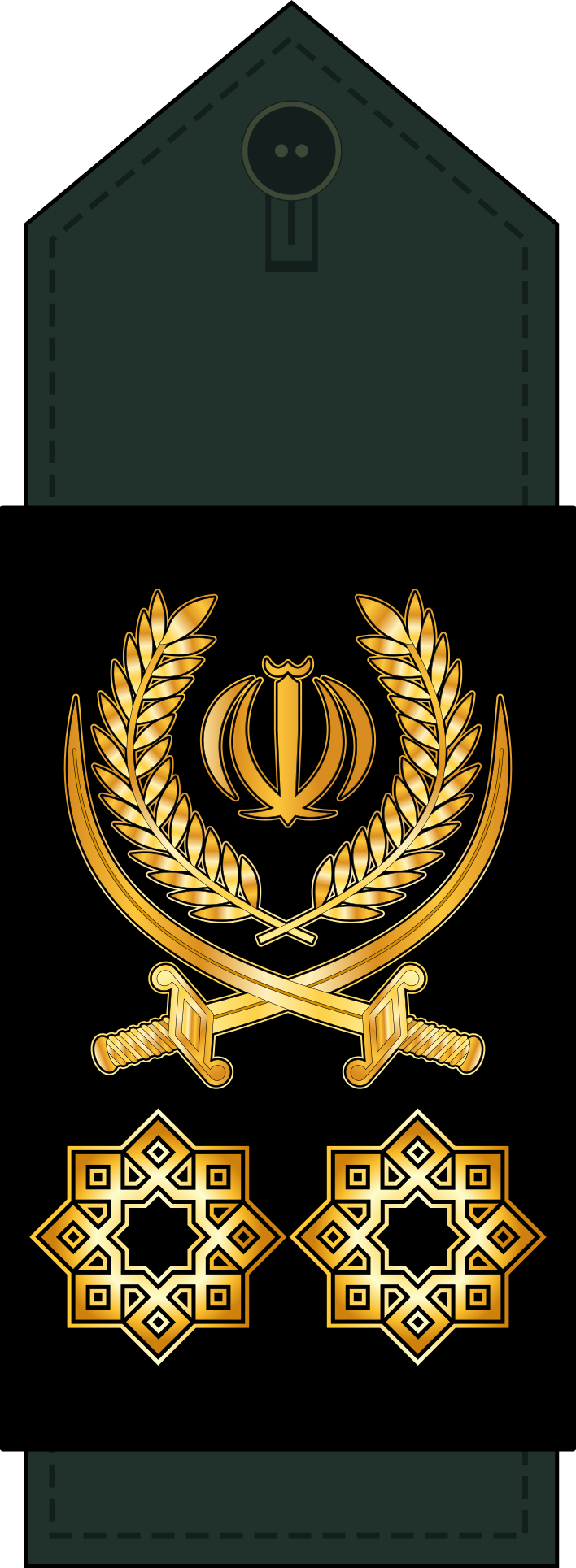
- Rank: Major General
- Battles/wars: Iran–Iraq War; KDPI insurgency (1989–1996); Insurgency in Sistan and Balochistan; Syrian civil war; Iranian intervention in Syria; War in Iraq (2013–2017); Iranian intervention in Iraq; Iran–PJAK conflict; Western Iran clashes; 2019–2021 Persian Gulf crisis; 2024 Iran–Israel conflict; Twelve-Day War; 2026 Iran war

Mohsen Rezaei (Persian: محسن رضایی, born Sabzevar Rezaei Mirgha'ed (Persian: سبزوار رضایی میرقائد); born 9 September 1954) is an Iranian politician and military officer who has served as Secretary of the Supreme National Security Council since August 2026. A principlist affiliated with the Resistance Front of Islamic Iran, he is also a member of the Expediency Discernment Council and secretary of the Supreme Council for Economic Coordination.

Born into a religious family in Masjed Soleyman, Rezaei was a member of the Shia Islamist guerrilla group Mansouroun during the Iranian Revolution. He joined the Islamic Revolutionary Guard Corps (IRGC) in 1980 and served as its commander-in-chief from 1981 to 1997. After leaving the IRGC, Rezaei pursued a political career, unsuccessfully running for president in 2009, 2013 and 2021. He served as secretary of the Expediency Discernment Council from 1997 to 2021 and as vice president of Iran for economic affairs from 2021 and 2023.

Rezaei is subject to sanctions imposed by the United States for alleged involvement in terrorism and nuclear proliferation. Since 2007, he has been wanted by Argentine authorities in connection with the 1994 AMIA bombing, allegations he has denied.

== Early life and education ==
Rezaei was born in Masjed Soleyman on 9 September 1954 to a religious Lur family belonging to the Bakhtiari tribe.

In 1969, Rezaei and his family moved to Ahvaz, where he became involved in political activities opposing the rule of Mohammad Reza Shah Pahlavi. He was subsequently arrested by SAVAK, the Shah's intelligence and security agency, and spent five months in solitary confinement at the age of 17. Following his release, he continued his political activities.

During the 1970s, Rezaei established provincial branches of Mansouroun, a Shia Islamist, anti-monarchy guerrilla group. In 1974, he enrolled at the Iran University of Science and Technology to study mechanical engineering, but discontinued his studies amid an intensified SAVAK crackdown on guerrilla organizations with which he was affiliated. After the Iran–Iraq War, Rezai studied economics at the University of Tehran and received his PhD in 2001.

== Military career ==
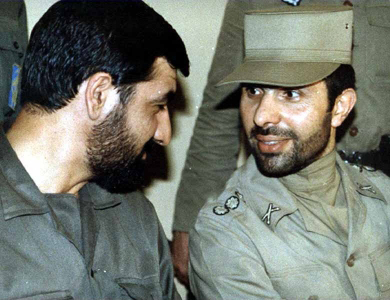
Mohsen Rezaei and Ali Sayad Shirazi

Following the Iranian Revolution in 1979, Mansouroun and six other armed Islamist groups merged to form the Mojahedin of the Islamic Revolution Organization, of which Rezaei became a member. In 1980, Rezaei joined the newly-formed Islamic Revolutionary Guard Corps (IRGC); by September 1981, he had become its commander-in-chief.

During the Iran–Iraq War, Rezaei emerged as a proponent of continuing the war against Iraq and its Western allies indefinitely, even after Iraqi troops had been expelled from Iranian territory. Rezaei faced opposition from within the IRGC, including a 1984 letter in which 90 IRGC commanders urged Supreme Leader Ruhollah Khomeini to restrain his authority. Khomeini instead responded by purging the dissenting commanders.

In 1986, Rezaei was appointed to the Supreme Defense Council. In July of that year, he clashed with Ali Sayad Shirazi, commander of Iran's ground forces, over military strategy. After their rivalry became public, Khomeini summoned both commanders to his residence on 19 July 1986 and urged them to "seek unity". As the prospects of an Iranian victory diminished, Rezaei reconsidered his position and, in 1988, sent a letter to Khomeini arguing that the war could not be won.

In 1997, Rezaei was removed as commander-in-chief of the IRGC and replaced by Yahya Rahim Safavi, reportedly following pressure from supporters of newly elected president Mohammad Khatami. In 2015, Rezaei was reported to have returned to the IRGC.

Following the outbreak of the 2026 Iran War, Supreme Leader Mojtaba Khamenei appointed Rezaei as his military adviser.

== Political career ==
In 1997, Rezaei became secretary of the Expediency Discernment Council. In 2002, he allegedly founded the conservative news website Baztab in response to the growing number of pro-reformist websites.

Rezaei was a candidate in the 2005 Iranian presidential election, but withdrew on 15 June 2005, two days before the election. He did not endorse another candidate, stating that his withdrawal was intended to promote the "integration" and "effectiveness" of the nation's votes.

On 23 April 2009, Rezaei announced his candidacy in the 2009 presidential election, after failing to find another conservative candidate to run against incumbent president Mahmoud Ahmadinejad. In the run-up to the election, Rezaei criticized Ahmadinejad's statements questioning the Holocaust, describing them as "not useful" for Iran's international standing. Following the disputed election and subsequentprotests, Rezaei condemned the trials of political prisoners as unjust.

In October 2012, Rezaei announced his candidacy in the 2013 presidential election. In 2016, he announced that he "has no decision to run for president" in the 2017 presidential election, but later told press in February 2017 that if asked by the Popular Front of Islamic Revolution Forces to stand, he "will think about it".

On 9 August 2026, Supreme Leader Mojtaba Khamenei appointed Rezaei secretary of the Supreme National Security Council, replacing Mohammad Bagher Zolghadr, who was reassigned as a political adviser. The appointment came amid unconfirmed reports and speculation concerning Khamenei's whereabouts and condition.

== Controversies ==
=== Accusations of terrorist activities ===
In 2006, Argentinian Judge Rodolfo Canicoba Corral issued international arrest warrants for Rezaei, six other Iranians, and one Lebanese national in connection with the 18 July 1994 AMIA bombing, a suicide bombing of a Jewish Community Center in Buenos Aires, Argentina, that killed 85 people and injured over 300 others. Since 2007, Rezaei has been subject to an Interpol Red Notice for alleged "Aggravated Murder and Damages" in connection with the 1994 AMIA bombing, which remains the deadliest terrorist attack in Argentine history to date. Rezaei denied the allegations, calling the charges "a sheer lie".

In 1998, Rezaei's eldest son, Ahmad, defected to the United States, where he told U.S. officials that the 1992 Buenos Aires Israeli embassy bombing had been planned in Tehran. He further claimed that he had accompanied his father to Lebanon to witness the training. In 2005, however, Ahmad Rezaei returned to Iran and recanted his statements about his father's involvement in the bombing. He was reported to have left Iran again in 2009. On 13 November 2011, his body was found in a hotel in Dubai. Initial reports suggested that he had been assassinated by a hotel employee at the behest of the Iranian government, but the Dubai Police Force attributed his death to suicide following the consumption of a large quantity of antidepressants.

=== U.S. sanctions ===
On January 10, 2020, Rezaei was added to the U.S. Department of the Treasury's Specially Designated Nationals and Blocked Persons List pursuant to Executive Order 13876, as part of broader sanctions targeting Iranian officials whom the U.S. government accused of advancing Iran's destabilizing objectives.

=== Pakistan nuclear strike claim ===
On 16 June 2025, during the Twelve-Day War, Rezaei claimed on Iranian state television that Iran possessed "undisclosed" military capabilities, and that Pakistan had assured Iran it would launch a nuclear strike on Israel if Israel used nuclear weapons against Iran. However, Pakistan’s defense minister, Khawaja Asif, rejected the claim.

== Personal life ==
Rezaei married in 1974 and has five children, two sons and three daughters. His brother, Omidvar, has served a member of the Islamic Consultative Assembly since 2008.

== Electoral history ==
Year	Election	Votes	%	Rank	Notes
2000	Parliament	539,796	18.41	36th	Lost
2005	President	–			Withdrew
2009	President	678,240	1.73	3rd	Lost
2013	President	▲3,884,412	▲10.55	4th	Lost
2021	President	▼3,412,712	▲11.79	2nd	Lost

== Bibliography ==
- Iran at future horizon
- Fath's orders
- Iran and Middle East
- Look of the Sun
- I want to die like a cloud
- 186 Pilgrim notes
- Regional Iran
- Answer to some questions about War
- Establishment of Badr's Sepah
- Explanation of trade flows on industrial productivity in Iran
- Rights of the accused in the court system
- Hidden Hands
- The third face of economic jihad
- Ahmad Kazemi's biography
- Model for cultural policy and planning
- Who was Ebrahim Hemat?
- The second wave of the Revolution
- Economic Federalism
- Monetary theory, and general equilibrium Atyar

== See also ==
- List of Iranian two-star generals since 1979
- Iranian leaders of the Iran–Iraq War
- Hassan Bagheri

Military offices
Preceded by Ali Mohammad Besharati	Head of the Intelligence Department of the IRGC; June 1979–September 1981	Succeeded by Vahid Nasseri
Preceded by Morteza Rezaee	Commander-in-Chief of the Islamic Revolutionary Guard Corps; 20 September 1981–19 September 1997	Succeeded by Yahya Rahim Safavi
Political offices
Preceded by Mohammad Bagher Zolghadr	Secretary of the Supreme National Security Council; 9 August 2026–present	Incumbent
Preceded by Mohammad Nahavandian	Secretary of the Supreme Council for Economic Coordination; 2021–present	Incumbent
New title	Chairman of the Economic, Commercial, and Administrative Committee of the Expediency Discernment Council; 1997–present	Incumbent
Preceded by Hassan Habibi	Secretary of the Expediency Discernment Council; 9 September 1997–19 September 2021	Succeeded by Mohammad Bagher Zolghadr
Preceded by Mohammad Nahavandian	Vice President of Iran for Economic Affairs; 25 August 2021–11 June 2023	Succeeded by vacant
