= Supreme National Defense University =

Military university in Tehran, Iran

Coordinates: 35.7840°N 51.5308°E

- دانشگاه عالی دفاع ملی
- Seal of the University
- Former name: Officers' School
- Type: Military Academy
- Established: 1991
- Affiliations: Iranian Armed Forces
- Commandant: BG Esmail Ahmadi-Moghaddam
- Students: Senior Officers and Generals
- Location: Tehran, Iran
- Campus: Urban
- Website: sndu.ac.ir

Supreme National Defense University (Note: (Persian: دانشگاه و پژوهشگاه عالی دفاع ملی و تحقیقات راهبردی, romanized: Daneshgah-e 'ali-ye Defa'-e Melli va Tahqiqat-e Rahbordi, lit. 'National Defense University and Institute for Strategic Research'), acronymed DĀʿĀ (Persian: داعا)) is an Iranian university located in Tehran. Subordinate of General Staff of Armed Forces of the Islamic Republic of Iran, the university is dedicated to doctoral-level work on military doctrine, applied defense sciences and management.
