= Islamic Nations Party =

Iranian guerrilla group

- Red flag with eight-pointed star
- Leader: Kazem Mousavi-Bojnourdi (POW)
- Dates active: late 1950s–late 1960s Main phase: 1963–1965
- Headquarters: Tehran, Iran
- Ideology: Islamic socialism; Islamic fundamentalism; Revolutionary socialism; Pan-Islamism; Guevarism; Shariatism
- Political position: Far-left
- Size: ~200
- Wars: Iranian Revolution

Islamic Nations Party or Party of Islamic Nations (Persian: حزب ملل اسلامی, romanized: Ḥezb-e melal-e eslāmi) was an Islamic leftist armed group with clandestine system short-lived during 1960s. It was initially a secret society active against Pahlavi dynasty in late 1950s. It consisted of middle-class youth, mostly highschool teachers and university students.

The organization was reportedly involved in 1963 events and 1965 assassination of Hassan Ali Mansur. However, it is alleged that opening fire on Police before arrest of leading members was its "sole standoff".

After a visit to Iraq, leader Mousavi-Bojnourdi brought two firearms for the planned bank robbery and kidnapping. A rank-and-file member was arrested accidentally and led security forces to a 140-men list of the members. A cache of arms belonging to the party was also discovered in the hills of north Tehran.

55 members of the group were arrested in 1965 and received long-term confinements in 1966 by military tribunal. Four members were executed and death sentence of the leader Mousavi-Bojnourdi reduced to life in prison.

A number of Revolutionary Guards commanders including Javad Mansouri, Abbas Zamani and Abbas Duzduzani were members of the group.
