= Abbas Mohtaj =

Iranian military officer and politician

Sardar Abbas Mohtaj
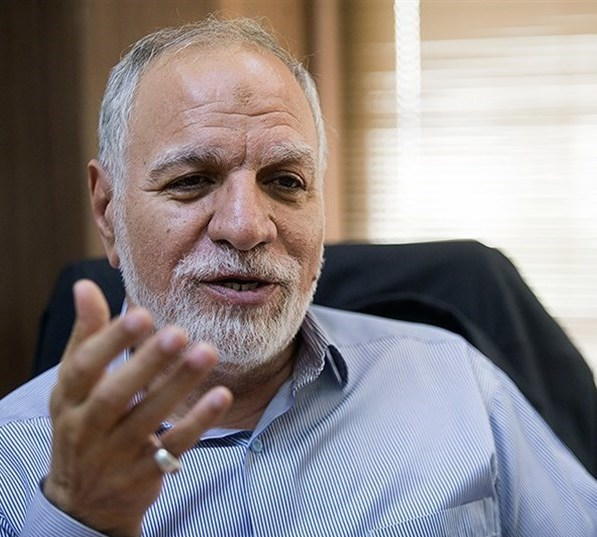
- Abbas Mohtaj in 2019
- Allegiance: Iran
- Branch: Revolutionary Guards
- Service years: 1980–2005; 2013–2016
- Rank: Commodore
- Commands: Islamic Republic of Iran Navy
- Conflicts: Iran–Iraq War

Governor General of Qom
- In office 11 November 2005 – 17 March 2008
- President: Mahmoud Ahmadinejad
- Preceded by: Hamid Tahayi
- Succeeded by: Mohammad Ardakani

Abbas Mohtaj (Persian: عباس محتاج) is an Iranian military officer and politician.

He served in the Islamic Revolutionary Guard Corps during Iran–Iraq War and was moved to the Islamic Republic of Iran Army after the war, holding office as the Commander of the Islamic Republic of Iran Navy between 1997 and 2005. Mohtaj was a government official in the administration of Mahmoud Ahmadinejad from 2005 to 2009, serving as a governor and then a vice minister.

== Military career ==
Mohtaj was deputy chairman of the General Staff of the Revolutionary Guards from 1988 to 1989. He was appointed as the deputy commander of the Ground Forces of the Revolutionary Guards under Mostafa Izadi in 1989. When Ali Shamkhani held office as the commander of Iran's regular Navy and Navy of the Revolutionary Guards simultaneously, Mohtaj was his deputy in the former maritime forces since October 1990 and succeeded Shamkhani as the commander of that military branch in 1997.

Military offices
Preceded by Reza Khorram-Tousi	Chairman of Artesh Cooperation Bonyad; 2013–2016	Succeeded by Büyük Abbaszadeh
Preceded by Ali Shamkhani	Commander of the Islamic Republic of Iran Navy; 1997–2005	Succeeded by Sajjad Kouchaki
Preceded by Unknown	Deputy Commander of Artesh Navy; 1990–1997	Succeeded by Unknown
Preceded by Unknown	Deputy Commander of IRGC Ground Force; 1989–1990	Succeeded by Unknown
Preceded by Unknown	Deputy Chairman of IRGC General Staff; 1988–1989	Succeeded by Unknown
Government offices
Preceded by Mohammad Bagher Zolghadr	Vice Minister of Interior for Security; 2008–2009	Succeeded by Ali Abdollahi
Preceded by Hamid Tahayi	Governor of Qom Province; 2005–2008	Succeeded by Mohammad Nazemi Ardakani
