= IRGC Cooperation Bonyad =

Bonyad concerning the Islamic Revolutionary Guard Corps

IRGC Cooperation Bonyad (Persian: بنیاد تعاون سپاه پاسداران انقلاب اسلامی lit. The Cooperative Foundation of the Revolutionary Guards) is a Bonyad in Iran, under control of Islamic Revolutionary Guard Corps.

== Sanctions ==
The US Treasury Department put sanctions on the foundation in December 2010.
