= Battle of Mehran (1986) =

Operation in Iran-Iraq war

- Part of Iran–Iraq War
Date	May–June 1986
Location	Mehran, Iran
Result	Iranian victory: Iran recaptures Mehran; Iraqi counterattack failed; Saddam Hussein called for the mobilization of the Iraqi Popular Army militia
Territorial changes	Iranians once again liberate Mehran

Belligerents
Iraq	Iran

Casualties and losses
1,000 killed 3,000 wounded 1,200 captured 80 tanks and 6 helicopters lost	3,000 killed 9,000 wounded

In response to the loss of the strategic al-Faw Peninsula during the Iran–Iraq War, the Iraqis pushed into Iran to seize the strategic Iranian city of Mehran to trade for the strategically important territory. Saddam was able to seize the city in May 1986, for the third time. He then offered to trade it for al-Faw, but instead of negotiating, the Iranians recaptured the city in June 1986.

== Background ==
On February 10, 1986, Iran launched a successful surprise amphibious assault, (what became known as the first Battle of Al-Faw), across the Shatt al-Arab (Arvand rud in Persian) waterway and seized the strategic al-Faw Peninsula. The Iraqi units in charge of the defenses were mostly made up of poorly trained Iraqi Popular Army conscripts that collapsed when they were suddenly attacked by the Iranian Pasdaran (Revolutionary Guard) forces.

== The battle ==
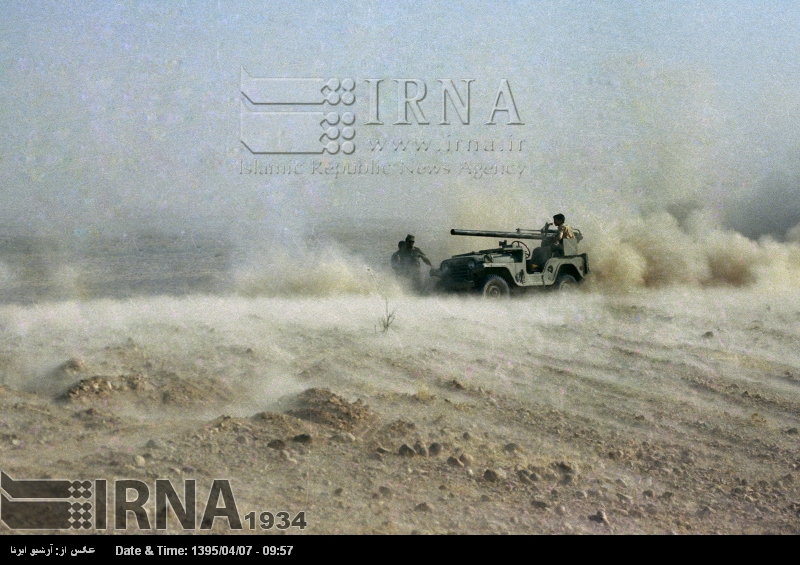
Iranian forces on the outskirts of the city during Operation Karbala 1

Immediately after the Iranian capture of Al-Faw, Saddam declared a new offensive against Iran, Al Defa Al Muthaharraka (Arabic for The Dynamic Defense), designed to drive deep into Iran. The Iranian border city of Mehran, Ilam province on the foot of the Zagros Mountains was selected as the first target. This city was situated on an important road leading into Iran. On May 15–19 the Iraqi Army's II Corps supported by helicopter gunships captured the city. Saddam then offered the Iranians to exchange Mehran for Al-Faw. The Iranians rejected the Iraqi offer. Iraq then continued the attack, attempting to push deeper into Iran. However, Iraq's attack was quickly smashed by Iranian AH-1 Cobra helicopters with TOW missiles destroying an unspecified amount of Iraqi tanks and vehicles.

Iranian troops using mountain warfare built up their forces on the heights surrounding the city. On June 30, they launched Operation Karbala 1, recapturing the area by July 3. Saddam ordered the Republican Guard to retake the city on July 4, but their attack was thoroughly defeated. The Iraqi losses were so heavy the Iranians managed to capture some territory inside of Iraq as well. Iraq's defeats at al-Faw and at Mehran were a severe blow to the prestige of the Iraqi regime. The western powers including the U.S. also became more determined to prevent an Iraqi loss.

== Aftermath ==
After the defeat, Saddam and the Baath Party held an "Extraordinary Congress" and decided on a full mobilization of the Iraqi Popular Army. Enlisting men as old as 42, the regime initiated a total call-up of available manpower in 1986. At the time the government feared that calls for the mobilization would lead to draft riots, but the response was good: young men – even college students – reported without incident. The fact that the public answered the call indicated that Iraqis feared invasion during the war.

== Order of battle ==
=== Iraq ===
Iraqi Army

- 2nd Corps
  - 17th Armored Division
    - 70th Armored Brigade
    - 59th Armored Brigade
    - 705th Infantry Brigade
- 433rd, 417th, 425th Infantry Brigades
- 1st Commando Brigade, Commando Battalion of the 40th Infantry Division

Reinforcements sent:

Republican Guard

- 1st Mechanized
- 4th and 5th Infantry Brigades
- 3rd Special Forces Brigade
- 2nd and 10th Armored Brigades

Iraqi Army

- 35th Infantry Division
  - 71st, 72nd, 3rd Infantry Brigades
- 501st, 113th, 95th, 118th, and 108th Infantry Brigades
- 24th Mechanized Brigade
- 2nd, 3rd, and 5th Commando Brigades, Commando Battalion of the 20th Infantry Division, Commando Battalion of the 2nd Infantry Division
- 65th Special Forces Brigade
- 763rd, 110th, 15th, 766th, 217th, 238th, 53rd, 247th, and 489th Artillery Battalions

=== Iran ===
- Najaf Headquarters
  Commanded by Mostafa Izadi
  - 27th Muhammad Rasulullah Division
    6 infantry battalions, 1 tank battalion
  - 17th Ali ibn Abi Talib Division
    Commanded by Gholamreza Jaafari
    3 infantry battalions, 1 tank battalion
  - 5th Nasr Division
    3 infantry battalions
  - 25th Karbala Division
    Commanded by Morteza Ghorbani
    4 infantry battalions, 1 tank battalion
  - 10th Sayyed-osh-Shohada Division
    3 infantry battalions
  - 41st Sarallah Division
    Commanded by Qasem Soleimani
    4 infantry battalions, 1 tank battalion
  - 21st Imam Reza Independent Brigade
    2 infantry battalions
  - 15th Imam Hassan Independent Brigade
    5 infantry battalions
  - 662nd Beit-ol-Moqaddas Independent Brigade
    2 infantry battalions
  - 38th Zolfaghar Independent Armored Battalion
    1 tank company
  - 2 artillery battalions from IRGC, 4 artillery battalions from Army
- Islamic Republic of Iran Army Aviation

== See also ==
- First Battle of al-Faw
- Republican Guard (Iraq)
