= Sobh-e-No =

Daily newspaper in Iran

Sobh-e-No (Persian: صبح نو, lit. 'New Morning') is a Persian daily newspaper in Tehran, Iran. It has a conservative tendency and is actually a daily close to Iranian Principlists which mostly focuses on cultural, social and political issues.

== History and profile ==
Sobh-e-No was established in May 2016. Farshad Mahdipour is the proprietor of the newspaper, he is also the editor-in-chief of it. He describes Sobh-e-No's policy as a media which tries to give logical analyses about Islamic revolutionary values and while reflects the latest domestic and the world's news, has an effort to present analytical comments about the ongoing political issues.

The paper has been claimed to have ties with “Owj Arts and Media Organization” or be supported by “Mohammad Bagher Ghalibaf,” the previous mayor of Tehran. But Rejecting press claims, Sobh-e-No stressed its independence as a private newspaper. As one of the most active newspapers over the Internet, it is accessed and welcomed in the online social networks: Twitter, Instagram and telegram by a large range of readers.

== Notable works ==
Coinciding with the releasing of Jason Rezaian on 16 January 2016, Sobh-e-No was the only newspaper which published a comprehensive report about his last presence in Tehran Mehrabad International Airport on 15 January 2016 a day before his release. The publication of the report and its vast reflection on social media especially Twitter can be considered as the main cause that Jason Rezaian reacted to it by posting the first page of Sobh-e-No on his Twitter page.
