= Virtual Parliament of Iran =

Iran's virtual parliament

Website
- http://vp.parliran.ir/

Iran's virtual parliament (Persian: پارلمان مجازی ایران) was inaugurated on December 8, 2020, in the presence of Parliament Speaker Mohammad Baqer Qalibaf
