= Morteza Ghorbani =

Iranian brigadier general (born 1957)

Sardar Morteza Ghorbani
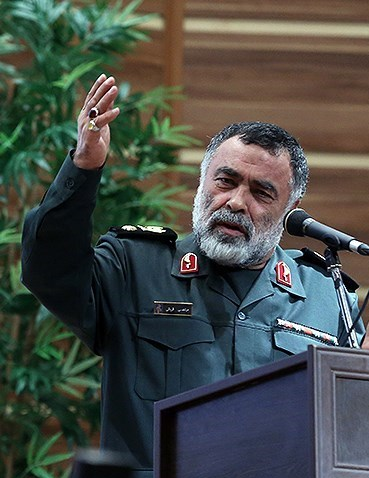
- Born: 1957 (age 68–69); Borkhar، Isfahan، Iran
- Relatives: Shahnaz Ashkian (wife)
- Military career
- Allegiance: Iran
- Branch: IRGC
- Service years: 1979-present
- Rank: Brigadier General
- Unit: NEZSA
- Commands: 25th Karbala Division 5th Nasr Division 9th Badr Division Najaf Ashraf Headquarters 14th Imam Hossein Division
- Wars: Iran–Iraq War Major operations: Samen-ol-A'emeh; Tariq al-Quds; Beit ol-Moqaddas; Dawn 8; Battle of Mehran; Karbala-4; Siege of Basra
- Awards: 1st grade Fath Medal 2nd grade Fath Medal 3rd grade Fath Medal

Advisor to the President of Iran
- In office 1997–2001
- President: Mohammad Khatami
- Preceded by: Create the title
- Succeeded by: Abbas Paknejad Mojtaba Rahmandoust

Morteza Ghorbani (Persian: مرتضی قربانی, born 1957 in Borkhar) is a Brigadier general of the Islamic Revolutionary Guard Corps, currently serving as an advisor to the Chief of Staff of the Armed Forces and a senior advisor to the Commander-in-Chief of the IRGC. He has also been the President of the Iranian Shooting Sport Federation since 2021.

He was a commander of the Revolutionary Guard Corps during the Iran–Iraq War and is the founder and first commander of the 25th Karbala Division and the 5th Nasr Division. Ghorbani was actively involved in all of the IRGC's extensive operations during the Iran–Iraq War, and played a key role in the operations of Fath ol-Mobin, Beit ol-Moqaddas, Muharram, and Wal-Fajr 8. He commanded the 14th Imam Hossein Division from 1991 to 1997. Ghorbani was awarded the Order of Fath three times for his services in the war.

== Awards and recognition ==
- Fath grade 1
- Fath grade 2
- Fath grade 3

== See also ==
- Iranian Shooting Sport Federation
- 25th Karbala Division
- First Battle of al-Faw
- Operation Beit ol-Moqaddas
- Operation Tariq al-Quds
- 5th Nasr Division
- Operation Dawn-4
- Battle of Mehran
- 14th Imam Hossein Division
- Advisor to the President of Iran
- Holy Defense Museum

Military offices
| New title | Commander of 25th Karbala Division; 1981–1982 | Succeeded by Abdol Ali Omrani |
| New title | Commander of 5th Nasr Division; 1982–1984 | Succeeded by Mohammad-Bagher Ghalibaf |
| Preceded by Mohammad Hassan Kusechi | Commander of 25th Karbala Division; 1988–1984 | Succeeded by Mohammad-Bagher Ghalibaf |
| Preceded by Mohammad Reza Naqdi | Commander of 9th Badr Division; 1989–? | Succeeded by ? |
| Preceded by Mohammad-Bagher Ghalibaf | Commander of Najaf Ashraf Headquarters; 1991–? | Succeeded by Hossein Hamadani |
| Preceded by Mohammad Reza Zahedi | Commander of 14th Imam Hossein Division; 1991–1997 | Succeeded by Ahmad Kazemi |
Political offices
| New title | Advisor to the President of Iran; 1997–2001 | Succeeded by Abbas Paknejad |
| New title | Advisor to the President of Iran; 1997–2001 | Succeeded by Mojtaba Rahmandoust |
Non-profit organization positions
| Preceded by Mousavi | Chairman of Holy Defense Museum; 2005–2010 | Succeeded by Mohammad Qhasem Nazer |
Sporting positions
| Preceded by Mehdi Mobini | Chairman of Iranian Shooting Sport Federation present–2021 | Incumbent |
