= Mohammad Ali Jafari =

Iranian general (born 1957))

Sardar Mohammad Ali Jafari
- محمدعلی جعفری
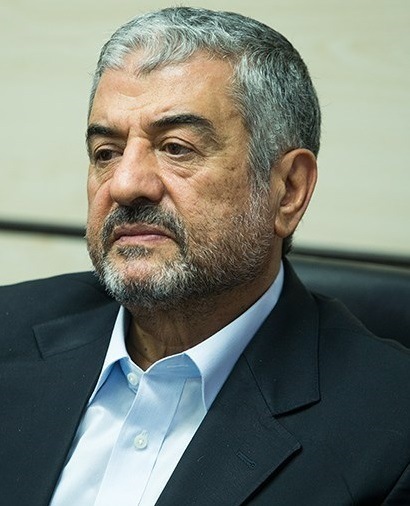
- Jafari in 2019

Commander of the Baqiatallah Cultural and Social Headquarters
- Incumbent
- Assumed office 21 April 2019
- President: Hassan Rouhani; Ebrahim Raisi; Mohammad Mokhber (acting); Masoud Pezeshkian
- Supreme Leader: Ali Khamenei; Mojtaba Khamenei
- Preceded by: Hossein Yekta

5th Commander-in-Chief of the Islamic Revolutionary Guard Corps
- In office 10 September 2007 – 21 April 2019
- President: Mahmoud Ahmadinejad; Hassan Rouhani
- Supreme Leader: Ali Khamenei
- Preceded by: Yahya Rahim Safavi
- Succeeded by: Hossein Salami

Commander of the Basij
- In office 20 September 2007 – 12 July 2008; Acting
- President: Mahmoud Ahmadinejad
- Supreme Leader: Ali Khamenei
- Preceded by: Mohammad Hejazi
- Succeeded by: Hossein Taeb

Head of the IRGC Strategic Center
- In office 2005–2007
- President: Mohammad Khatami; Mahmoud Ahmadinejad
- Supreme Leader: Ali Khamenei
- Preceded by: Office Established
- Succeeded by: Ali Akbar Ahmadian

Commander of Thar-Allah Headquarters
- In office 2000–2005
- President: Mohammad Khatami
- Supreme Leader: Ali Khamenei
- Preceded by: Hossein Nejat
- Succeeded by: Nasser Shabani

Commander of the IRGC Ground Forces
- In office 11 July 1992 – 20 August 2005
- President: Akbar Hashemi Rafsanjani; Mohammad Khatami; Mahmoud Ahmadinejad
- Supreme Leader: Ali Khamenei
- Preceded by: Mostafa Izadi
- Succeeded by: Ahmad Kazemi

Deputy Commander of the IRGC Ground Forces
- In office 1988–1992
- President: Ali Khamenei; Akbar Hashemi Rafsanjani
- Supreme Leader: Ruhollah Khomeini; Ali Khamenei
- Preceded by: Abbas Mohtaj
- Succeeded by: Amin Shariati

Deputy for Operations of the IRGC Joint Staff
- In office 1989–1990
- President: Ali Khamenei
- Prime Minister: Mir-Hossein Mousavi
- Supreme Leader: Ruhollah Khomeini
- Preceded by: Gholam Ali Rashid
- Succeeded by: Ahmad Gholampour

Personal details
- Born: 1 September 1957 (age 69) Yazd, Pahlavi Iran
- Awards: 3rd grade Fath Medal
- Nickname(s): Aziz Jafari; Ali Jafari

Military service
- Allegiance: Iran
- Branch/service: IRGC
- Years of service: 1981–present
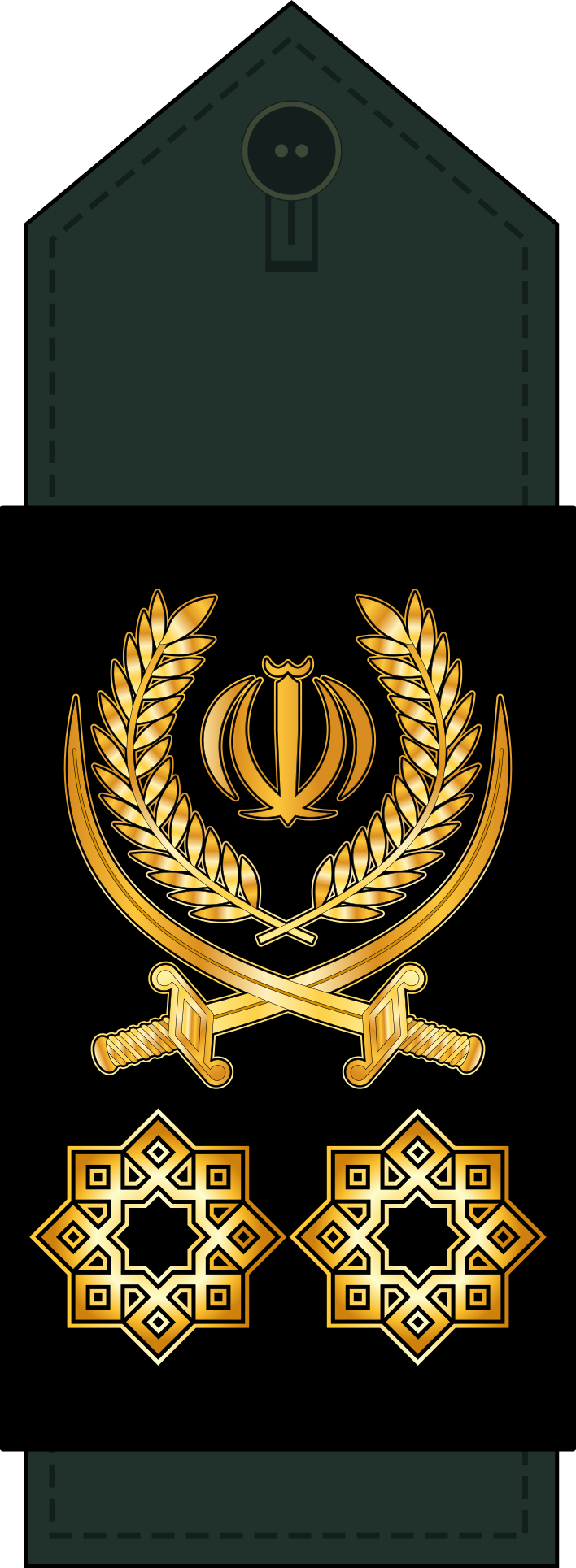
- Rank: Major General
- Unit: Ground Forces
- Commands: Quds Headquarters (1985–1988); Najaf Ashraf Headquarters (1982–1985); 1st Ashura Brigade (1981)
- Battles/wars: Iran–Iraq War (WIA); KDPI insurgency (1989–1996); War in Afghanistan (2001–2021); 2001 uprising in Herat; Insurgency in Sistan and Balochistan; Syrian civil war; Iranian intervention in Syria; War in Iraq (2013–2017); Iranian intervention in Iraq; Iran–PJAK conflict; Western Iran clashes

Mohammad Ali Jafari (Persian: محمدعلی جعفری, born 1 September 1957, also known as Aziz Jafari and Ali Jafari) is an Iranian military officer who was the commander-in-chief of the Iranian Revolutionary Guard Corps (IRGC) from 2007 to 2019. He was appointed by Supreme Leader Ali Khamenei on 1 September 2007, succeeding Major General Yahya Rahim Safavi, and was replaced in 2019 by Hossein Salami.

According to a 2 September 2007 report by Radio Free Europe, Radio Farda, Jafari was close to the conservative subfaction, which included Mohsen Rezaee, the secretary of the Expediency Discernment Council and former commander of the IRGC and Mohammad Bagher Ghalibaf, a former IRGC member and the mayor of Tehran. The replacement of Safavi was thought to be a move to strengthen the conservative faction as a counterweight to the radicalizers around President Mahmoud Ahmadinejad, to whom Safavi was close.

Jafari was seen as a tactician, organizer, and 'technical' military man, according to Radio Free Europe. The EU's official journal said the three Iranian Revolutionary Guard members, Jafari, General Qasem Soleimani, and the Guard's deputy commander for intelligence, Hossein Taeb, were subject to sanctions for providing equipment and support to help the Syrian regime suppress Syrian protesters.

== Biography ==
Jafari was born in Yazd and completed his primary and secondary education there. In 1977 he was admitted to Tehran University, where he studied civil (construction) technology. As a student, he participated in anti-Shah protests in Tehran, and was arrested and sent to jail for this. He represented his university department in the Islamic Organization of Tehran University.

At the start of the Iran–Iraq War Jafari fought with the Basij paramilitary force. In 1981, he became a part of the Revolutionary Guards where he rose to serve as a commander of operative battlefields of south and west during the early 1980s. He also participated as an assistant in the operation of Susangerd, and served as commander of the Ashura Brigade, as well as of the Headquarters of Qods and Najaf.

After the war Jafari returned to university to complete his education, and in 1992 received a degree in civil (construction) technology. In 1992 and 1993, he taught at the War University of the Revolutionary Guards. He was appointed to head "a strategic research center to map out new defensive and military strategies in response to what Iran's leadership has seen as evolving threats in the Middle East", according to Radio Free Europe/Radio Liberty. Jafari is said to have formed many of his ideas on unconventional or asymmetric warfare at the research center.

Prior to his appointment as leader of the guards, he was also the commander of Thar-Allah Headquarters in Tehran. In 1999, according to Radio Farda, Jafari was among 24 IRGC commanders who signed a letter to President Mohammad Khatami, warning him that his liberalizing policies, at a time of civil unrest in Tehran, threatened the country's leadership.

Jafari is a brother-in-law of Mohammad Bagher Zolghadr, a former deputy interior minister.

== Asymmetrical warfare knowledge and ties to Iraq ==
Jafari's work on asymmetric warfare strategies includes the use of Iranian terrain in mobile-defensive operations and relies on lessons and experiences learned in the Iran–Iraq War. He said in Tehran on 3 September 2007 that, given "the enemy's" numerical or technological superiority, the IRGC would use asymmetrical warfare capabilities such as those used by Hezbollah in its 2006 conflict with Israel in Lebanon. Iranian strategy would also reflect the strengths and weaknesses of U.S. forces in Afghanistan and Iraq, he said.

As leader of the IRGC's Center for Strategy, he led the development of the mosaic defence strategy from 2005.

On 2 September 2007, Radio Farda reported Jafari had extensive fighting experience and close relations with the commanders of the former Badr Brigades of the Supreme Council of the Islamic Revolution in Iraq (SCIRI).

== Political views ==
=== Hijab enforcement and public morality campaigns ===
On 8 March 2024, Jafari advocated for the deployment of hijab enforcement agents at all Tehran metro stations. He emphasized coordinated efforts with Tehran's municipal authorities to expand operations aimed at dismiss "improper hijab" behavior.

=== Censorship and media repression ===
Jafari oversaw the IRGC Intelligence Organization, which has been implicated in multiple crackdowns on media and free expression. This resulted in the arrest of several journalists, including Ehsan Mazandarani and Isa Saharkhiz. In addition, In February 2017, further arrests targeted Telegram users and journalists such as Hengameh Shahidi and Morad Saghafi. Jafari stated during a 2014 press conference: "As we have seen, in 1999 the Leader came out strongly against this sowing of doubt, and emphasized the need for the continuing existence of the IRGC for the continuation and advancement of the regime."

=== Crackdowns on civil and political activists ===
Under Jafari's command, IRGC units were involved in mass detentions of students, activists, and lawyers. Events include the “Spider” operation in 2015 and 2016 targeted social media users and models on Instagram under morality charges. In addition, lawyers Qassem Sholeh Saadi and Arash Kaykhosravi were arrested in 2018 during peaceful activism.

=== Israel ===
In 2015, Jafari declared that "The Revolutionary Guards will fight to the end of the Zionist regime." He added that Iran would "not rest easy until this epitome of vice is totally deleted from the region's geopolitics".

In November 2012, Jafari announced that Iran had provided Fajr-5 rocket technology to Hamas.

== Sanctions ==
On 29 September 2010, then–U.S. President Barack Obama imposed sanctions on eight Iranians, including Mohammad Ali Jafari, due to accusations of abusing human rights in 2009.

In 2011, the European Union and the UK imposed sanctions on Jafari for providing equipment and support to suppress protests in Syria.

== See also ==
- List of Iranian two-star generals since 1979
- Bahman Reyhani

Military offices
New title	Commander of the 1st Ashura Brigade; 1981	Succeeded by Amin Shariati as Commander of the 31st Ashura Brigade
New title	Commander of Najaf Ashraf Headquarters; 1982–1985	Succeeded by Mostafa Izadi
Preceded by ?	Commander of Quds Headquarters; 1985–1988; With: Gholam-Hossein Bashardoust (acting; 1986)	Succeeded by Mohammad Hejazi acting
Preceded by Gholam Ali Rashid as Deputy Operations Commander of the Commander-in-Chief of the Islamic Revolutionary Guard Corps	Deputy for Operations of the IRGC Joint Staff; 1989–1990	Succeeded by Ahmad Gholampour
Preceded by Abbas Mohtaj	Deputy Commander of the IRGC Ground Forces; 1988–1992	Succeeded by Amin Shariati
Preceded by Mostafa Izadi	Commander of the IRGC Ground Forces; 11 July 1992–20 August 2005	Succeeded by Ahmad Kazemi
Preceded by Hossein Nejat	Commander of Thar-Allah Headquarters; 2000–2005	Succeeded by Nasser Shabani
New title	Head of the IRGC Strategic Center; 2005–2007	Succeeded by Ali Akbar Ahmadian
Preceded by Mohammad Hejazi	Commander of the Basij acting; 20 September 2007–12 July 2008	Succeeded by Hossein Taeb
Preceded by Yahya Rahim Safavi	Commander-in-Chief of the Islamic Revolutionary Guard Corps; 10 September 2007–21 April 2019	Succeeded by Hossein Salami
Preceded by Hossein Yekta	Commander of Baqiyatallah Cultural and Social Headquarters; 21 April 2019–present	Incumbent
