= Iranian Shooting Sport Federation =

Iranian Olympic shooting authority

ASC
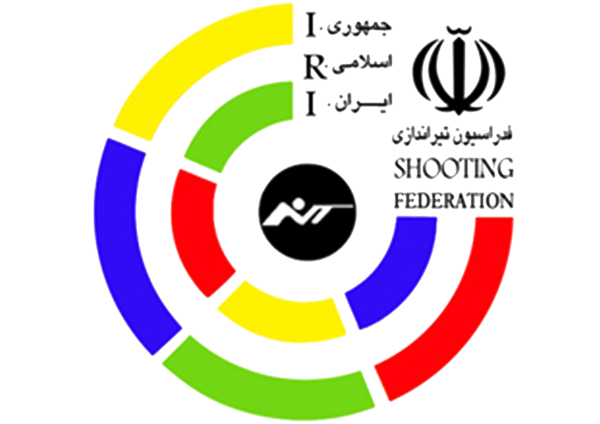
- Founded: 1958; 67 years ago
- Headquarters: Tehran, Iran
- ASC affiliation: 1958
- President: Morteza Ghorbani
- Website: http://www.Irissf.ir

The Shooting Federation of the Islamic Republic of Iran (English abbreviation: IRISSF and International Code: IRI) is the location of the Shooting Sports Office in Iran. The federation is responsible for sending teams and individuals to the Olympics for shooting sports.

== National teams ==
Fixed Target:

- Air Rifle National Shooting Teams
- Air Pistol National Shooting Teams

Clay pigeon shooting:

- Trap National Shooting Teams
- Skeet National Shooting Teams
