= Esmail Qaani =

Iranian general, commander of Quds Force (born 1957)

Sardar Esmail Qaani
- اسماعیل قاآنی
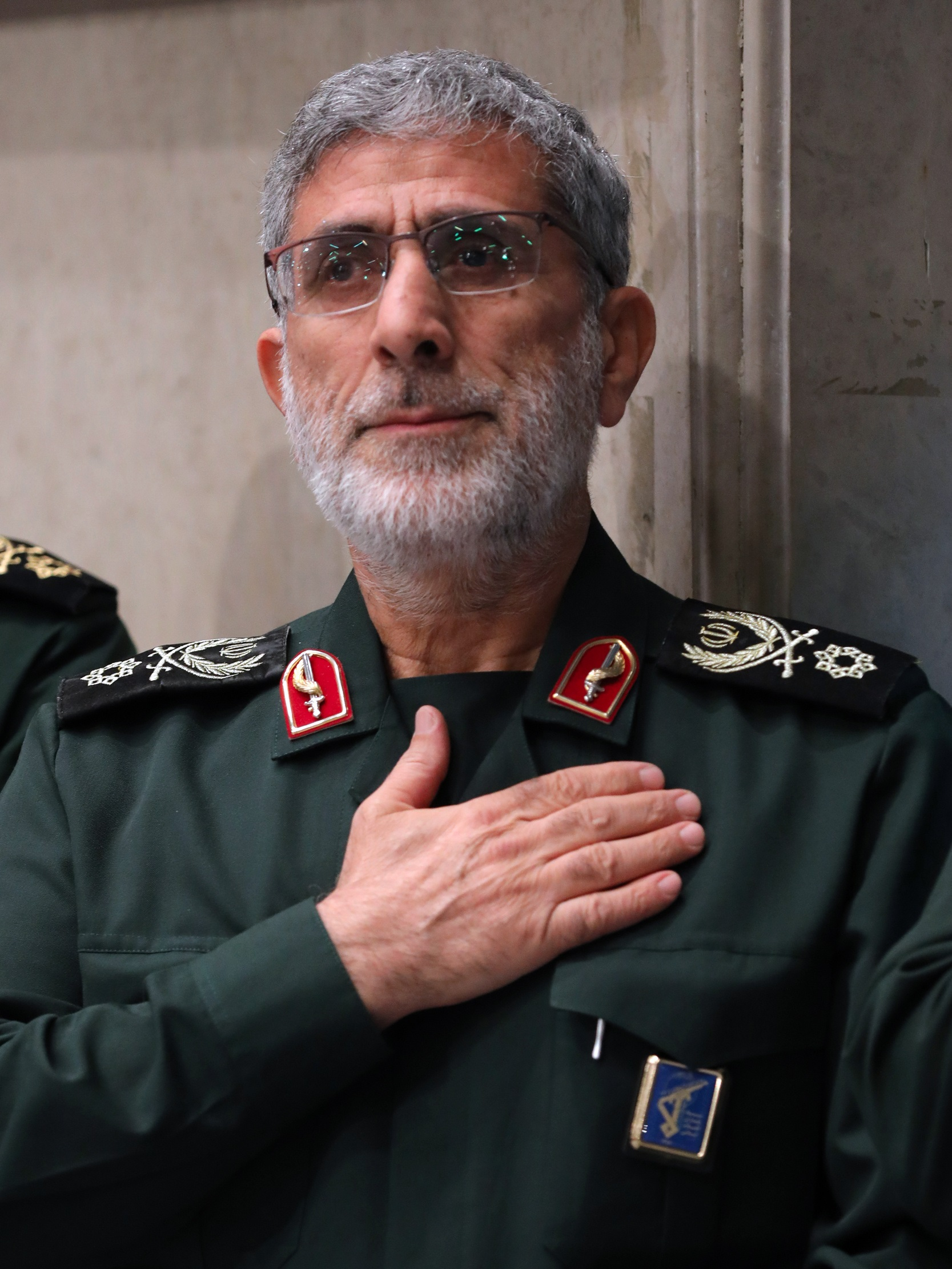
- Qaani in 2020

3rd Commander of the Quds Force
- Incumbent
- Assumed office 3 January 2020
- President: Hassan Rouhani; Ebrahim Raisi; Mohammad Mokhber (acting); Masoud Pezeshkian
- Supreme Leader: Ali Khamenei; Mojtaba Khamenei
- Preceded by: Qasem Soleimani

Deputy Commander of the Quds Force
- In office 21 March 1998 – 3 January 2020
- President: Mohammad Khatami; Mahmoud Ahmadinejad; Hassan Rouhani
- Supreme Leader: Ali Khamenei
- Preceded by: Office Established
- Succeeded by: Mohammad Hejazi

Head of the Intelligence Department of the Joint Staff of the IRGC
- In office 6 May 2006 – 2007
- President: Mahmoud Ahmadinejad
- Supreme Leader: Ali Khamenei
- Preceded by: Gholamhossein Ramezani
- Succeeded by: Seyyed Majid Ahmadi

Deputy Head of the IRGC Intelligence Protection Organization
- In office 2005–2006
- President: Mahmoud Ahmadinejad
- Supreme Leader: Ali Khamenei
- Preceded by: ?
- Succeeded by: ?

Personal details
- Born: 8 August 1957 (age 69) Mashhad, Pahlavi Iran
- Education: Imam Ali Officers' Academy
- Awards: Order of Fath (2nd Class); Iran–Iraq War Veteran Honors; Distinguished Service Medal (Islamic Revolutionary Guard Corps)

Military service
- Allegiance: Iran
- Branch/service: IRGC
- Years of service: 1980–present
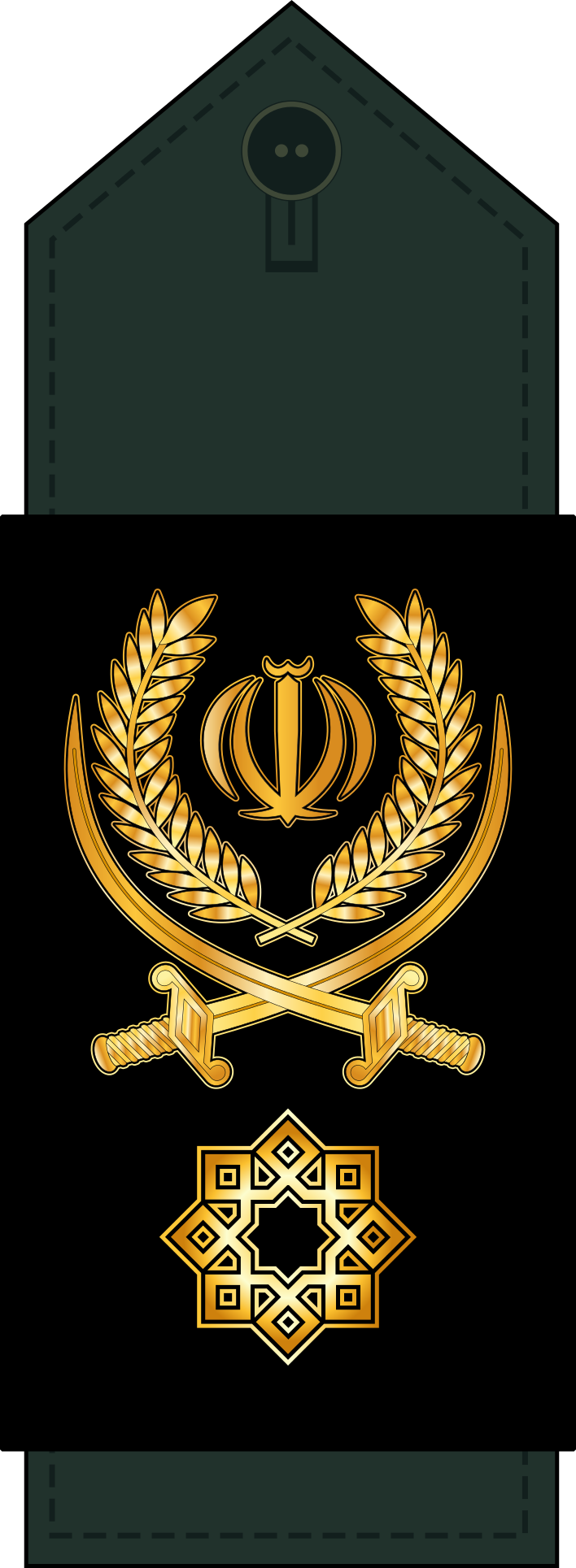
- Rank: Brigadier General
- Unit: Quds Force
- Commands: Deputy Commander Quds Headquarters (?–2005); 5th Nasr Division (?–1987); 21st Imam Reza Armored Brigade (1984–1987)
- Battles/wars: Kurdish Rebellion (1979) (WIA); Iran–Iraq War; Afghan Civil War (1996–2001); Iraq War; Syrian civil war; Iranian intervention in Syria; War in Iraq (2013–2017); Iranian intervention in Iraq; 2019–2021 Persian Gulf crisis; 2024 Iran–Israel conflict; Twelve-Day War; 2026 Iran war

Esmail Qaani (also rendered as Ismail Qaani; Persian: اسماعیل قاآنی, romanized: Esmāʾil Qāʾānī; 8 August 1957) is an Iranian brigadier general in the Islamic Revolutionary Guard Corps (IRGC) who serves as the commander of the IRGC Quds Force, an elite special operations force responsible for extraterritorial operations. Qaani succeeded Qasem Soleimani as Quds Force commander after Soleimani was assassinated in January 2020.

== Early life ==
Qaani was born in Mashhad, a pilgrimage city and the second most populous in Iran. He joined the Islamic Revolutionary Guard Corps (IRGC) in 1980.

== Military career ==
During the Iran–Iraq War, Qaani led the 5th Nasr Division and 21st Imam Reza Armored Brigade. In 1981, he received his military training in Imam Ali Officers' Academy in Tehran. The war was where he first met the late IRGC general, Qasem Soleimani, who was the commander of the 41st Tharallah Division at the time.

After the war, he joined the IRGC's Quds Force and began his activities in Khorasan province, which borders Afghanistan, Turkmenistan and Pakistan. While Soleimani was stationed in the west, Qaani focused on Iranian priorities in the east, such as combating drug smuggling and supporting Afghanistan's Northern Alliance in its battles against the Taliban during the Third Afghan Civil War.

Qaani was accused of a running a network that operated inside southeastern Pakistan for more than a decade until 2015, during his earlier service in the Quds Force. This network's alleged purpose was aimed at suppressing dissent towards the Iranian government from Iranian Balochistan by targeting cross-border terrorist networks as well as Iranian Baloch dissidents living in Pakistani Balochistan and Afghanistan.

In 1998, Qaani was appointed deputy commander of the Quds Force, by chief commander Rahim Safavi, with Qasem Soleimani as commander. As Deputy, Qaani oversaw financial disbursements to paramilitary groups including Hezbollah. An arms shipment intended for the Gambia was intercepted in Nigeria in October 2010.

=== War against the Taliban in Afghanistan ===
After joining the Quds Force, Qaani started military operations in eastern Iran that helped facilitate support for the Northern Alliance.

In the 1990s, he fought against Afghan drug cartels on Iran's border with Afghanistan. On 9 January 2018, Qaani visited a hospital that was being built with Iranian funds in Afghanistan as the envoy of Iran.

=== Syrian civil war ===
On 25 May 2012, two villages in the Houla region of Syria were attacked, resulting in the deaths of 108 people, including 49 children. United Nations investigators concluded that victims had been killed in "two bouts of summary executions" by pro-Assad Shabiha. U.S. State Department spokeswoman Victoria Nuland asserted on 29 May that Qaani alleged in an interview two days earlier that the Quds force helped train Shabiha forces responsible for the Houla attack.

On 27 May, Qaani gave an interview to Iranian Students News Agency (ISNA) stating, "Thanks to Iran's presence in Syria—physically and nonphysically—big massacres were prevented ... if the Islamic republic had not been present in Syria, the massacre of its people would have been multiplied." The interview was deleted from ISNA's site within hours, but copies remained on other news outlets.

According to Meir Javedanfar, an Iranian-Israeli expert on the Middle East, Qaani's statement was "the first time that an IRGC senior officer has admitted that the Quds force is operating in Syria." Joint Chiefs-of-Staff Chairman Hassan Firouzabadi voiced on Press TV that "[w]e do not interfere in Syria's internal affairs but we support Syria as the resistance front against Israel because one of our principles is the issue of Palestine. ... We have encouraged the country's government to implement reforms and listen to its people's demands."

Prior to his appointment as Quds Force commander, Qaani was most famous for recruiting the Liwa Fatemiyoun and Liwa Zainabiyoun Shia fighters operating in Syria He also organized their transport to Iran and training. This was because Qaani had already developed wide networks in the region and had a familiarity with it.

=== Escalation of Iran–United States tensions ===
As early as 2017, Qaani was quoted as having expressed bellicose rhetoric towards President Donald Trump, which was likely motivated by U.S. involvement in the region.

At a ceremony commemorating martyrs on 5 July 2017, he contended that the U.S. had futilely spent $6 trillion on Iraq and Afghanistan in attempts to attack Iran. He ended saying, "America has suffered more losses from us than we have suffered losses from them."

On 13 October 2017, President Trump declined to recertify the Joint Comprehensive Plan of Action (JCPOA), less formally known as the Iran nuclear deal.

On 22 January 2020, the U.S. targeted Qaani with a death threat, "if he followed a similar path by killing Americans." Abbas Mousavi, Spokesperson for the Ministry of Foreign Affairs of Iran said: "These words are an official announcement and a clear unveiling of America's targeted and governmental terrorism".

In January 2020, in the wake of the drone strike that killed his predecessor Soleimani, Qaani stated on Al-Jazeera, "We tell everyone, be patient and see the dead bodies of Americans all over the Middle East."

=== Command of Quds Force ===
In January 2020, the Leader of Iran, Ali Khamenei, appointed Qaani as Commander of the Quds Force after General Qasem Soleimani was killed by a targeted U.S. drone strike near Baghdad International Airport. Khamenei described him as "one of the most prominent military commanders during the Sacred Defense".

Saeid Golkar, a professor of political science at the University of Tennessee in the US and a visiting fellow for Iran policy at the Chicago Council on Global Affairs, believed that, for Khamenei, it was important that the new commander was "loyal" and "committed" to himself and the Revolutionary Guard and was familiar with the Quds Force and management of the forces and Iran's proxies. Qaani fitted that bill.

Iranian expatriate and political expert, Dr. Karim Abdian Bani Saeed, expressed the view that the appointment was hasty and that Qaani's expertise fell short of Soleimani. He noted that, despite his relatively low profile, Qaani had decades of foreign military experience and signaled that his appointment was unlikely to reduce the Quds Force influence upon Iranian foreign policy or change Iranian influence in the region.

=== Renewed tensions with Israel and US ===
In the lead up to the Twelve-Day War, Qaani strongly criticised Trump and the US assuring that Iran is ready and prepared for any military aggression.

== Allegations of espionage and withdrawal from public life ==
In early October 2024, concerns emerged regarding the whereabouts of Qaani. Speculation grew after his absence from major public events, including a prayer service led by Ayatollah Ali Khamenei in honor of Hezbollah leader Hassan Nasrallah. He was seen assisting Hezbollah in Beirut, but no official statement was issued by the IRGC regarding his condition. Israeli and Arab media reported that Qaani might have been injured or killed in an Israeli airstrike in Beirut. Iranian officials did not confirm his status. An October report by Middle East Eye stated that he was being questioned over security breaches. Qaani was rumored to have been under suspicion for a potential intelligence leak that enabled Israel to devastate Hezbollah in 2024. Following the Israeli assassination of Hezbollah leader Hassan Nasrallah, members of the IRGC reportedly questioned Qaani over concerns that he may have been linked to Israeli intelligence activities. According to that report, Qaani was allegedly placed under house arrest and interrogated on accusations of being an Israeli spy. On 15 October however, he appeared at a Tehran funeral ceremony for Abbas Nilforoushan.

== Reported death ==
In June 2025, The New York Times reported via Iranian state media and officials that Esmail Qaani, among others, had been killed in Israeli airstrikes conducted during the early stages of the Twelve-Day War.

This was not the first instance of unverified reports concerning Qaani's death. In October 2024, following an Israeli airstrike in Beirut that killed senior Hezbollah official Hashem Safieddine, speculation arose in regional media outlets suggesting Qaani had also been killed or injured, although no official confirmation was provided. Subsequent reports suggested that Qaani had been questioned by Iranian authorities regarding security lapses following Safieddine's death.

On 24 June 2025, a video on social media showed Qaani participating in a public demonstration in Tehran, thereby refuting reports of his death and confirming that he remained active in public life as of that date.

== Sanctions ==
In March 2012, Qaani was added to the Specially Designated Nationals and Blocked Persons List by the U.S. Department of the Treasury's Office of Foreign Assets Control (OFAC), freezing his presumed assets and prohibiting transactions with U.S. entities. The U.S. targeted Qaani with sanctions for overseeing the distribution of Quds Force funding to regional allies.

In October 2017, the Trump administration announced new sanctions against the Revolutionary Guard as a supporter of terrorist groups. Qaani responded, "We are not a war-mongering country. But any military action against Iran will be regretted... Trump's threats against Iran will damage America... We have buried many... like Trump and know how to fight against America."

In October 2022, Qaani was included in a Canadian sanctions list that included 9 Iranian entities, and 25 senior officials. The sanctions came in reaction to the death of Mahsa Amini, and the persecution of protestors in the widescale protests that ensued.

On 31 May 2024, the EU Council imposed personal sanctions against Qaani, citing his responsibility as the commander of the Quds Forces for providing Iranian weaponry to a wide web of Iran-backed militias and other proxies operating across the Middle East, including the Yemeni Houthi Movement.

== See also ==
- Iranian leaders of the Iran–Iraq War
- List of commanders of the Islamic Revolutionary Guard Corps
- Mohammad Reza Fallahzadeh

Military offices
Preceded by Qasem Soleimani	Commander of Quds Force; 3 January 2020–present	Incumbent
New title	Deputy Commander of Quds Force; 21 March 1998–3 January 2020	Succeeded by Mohammad Hejazi
Preceded by Gholamhossein Ramezani	Head of IRGC intelligence 6 May 2006–2007	Succeeded by Seyyed Majid Ahmadi
Preceded by ?	Deputy Head of IRGC intelligence Protection Organization; 2005–2006	Succeeded by ?
Preceded by ?	Deputy Commander Quds Headquarters ?–2005	Succeeded by Hossein Fattahi
Preceded by Mohammad Bagher Ghalibaf	Commander of the 5th Nasr Division ?–1987	Succeeded by ?
Preceded by Mohammad Bagher Ghalibaf	Commander of the 21st Imam Reza Armored Brigade; 1984–1987	Succeeded by Mohammad-Javad Mahdianpour
