= Hedayat Lotfian =

Iranian retired military officer

Amir Hedayat Lotfian
- هدایت لطفیان

Vice Chief of the General Staff of Iranian Armed Forces for Inspection
- In office 2000–2002
- President: Mohammad Khatami
- Supreme Leader: Ali Khamenei
- Preceded by: Ali Sayad Shirazi
- Succeeded by: Behrouz Soleiman-jah

Chief of the Iranian Police
- In office 15 February 1997 – 27 June 2000
- President: Akbar Hashemi Rafsanjani; Mohammad Khatami
- Supreme Leader: Ruhollah Khomeini; Ali Khamenei
- Preceded by: Reza Seifollahi
- Succeeded by: Mohammad Bagher Ghalibaf

Commander of Hamzah Sayyid al-Shuhada Headquarters
- In office 1985–1992
- President: Ali Khamenei; Akbar Hashemi Rafsanjani
- Prime Minister: Mir-Hossein Mousavi
- Supreme Leader: Ruhollah Khomeini; Ali Khamenei
- Preceded by: Mostafa Izadi
- Succeeded by: Ahmad Kazemi

Military service
- Allegiance: Iran
- Branch/service: Islamic Revolutionary Guard Corps
- Years of service: 1980s–2002
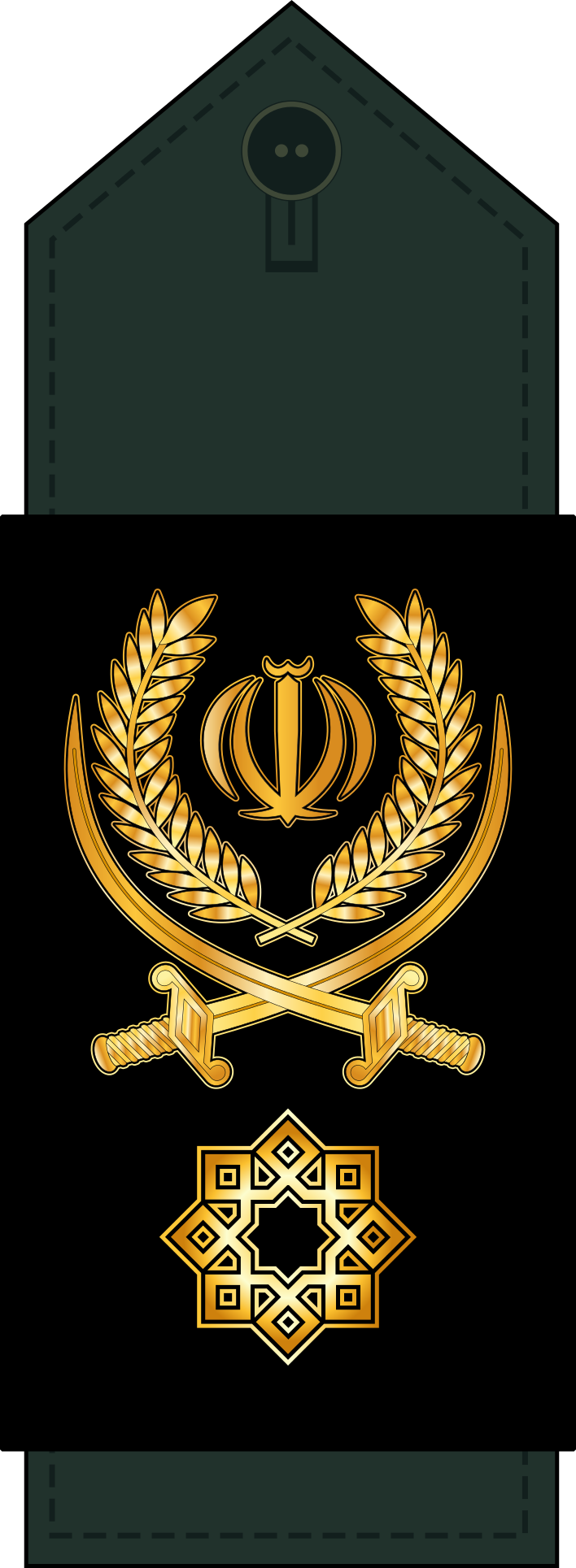
- Rank: Brigadier General
- Unit: Ground Forces
- Battles/wars: Iran–Iraq War

Hedayat Lotfian (Persian: هدایت لطفیان) is an Iranian retired military officer who served as Iran's Chief of police, the chief commander of Law Enforcement Force, from 1997 to 2000.

Police appointments
Preceded by Reza Seifollahi	Commander of the Law Enforcement Force; 1997–2000	Succeeded by Mohammad Bagher Ghalibaf
Military offices
Vacant Title last held by Ali Sayad Shirazi	Vice Chief of the General Staff of Iranian Armed Forces for Inspection; 2000–2002	Succeeded by Behrouz Soleiman-jah
Preceded by Mostafa Izadi	Commander of Hamzah Sayyid al-Shuhada Headquarters; 1985–1992	Succeeded by Ahmad Kazemi
