= Mehdi Rabbani =

Iranian military officer (died 2025)

Sardar Mehdi Rabbani
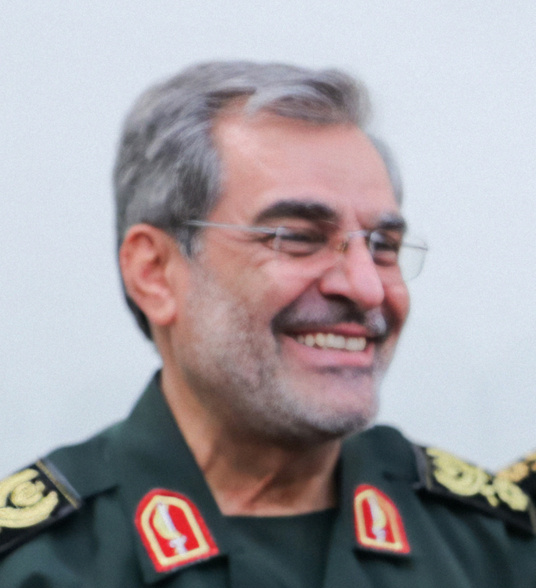
- Born: 1962; Isfahan, Iran
- Died: 13 June 2025 (aged 62–63); Tehran, Iran
- Cause of death: Assassination by airstrike
- Military career
- Allegiance: Iran
- Branch: Islamic Revolutionary Guard Corps
- Rank: Brigadier general (Pasdar)
- Unit: IRGC Ground Forces
- Commands: 4th Basij Division · 5th Nasr Division · Najaf Ashraf Base · Samen-ol-A'emeh Base
- Conflicts: Iran–Iraq War (WIA); Twelve-Day War X
- Awards: Order of Fath (1st Class)

Mehdi Rabbani (Persian: مهدی ربانی; 1962 – 13 June 2025) was an Iranian brigadier general in the Iranian Islamic Revolutionary Guard Corps (IRGC). He served as Deputy Head for Operations of the General Staff of the Armed Forces of the Islamic Republic of Iran from 2016 until his death in 2025, during the start of the Twelve-Day War.

== Career ==
Rabbani began his military career during the Iran–Iraq War as a member of the Iranian Islamic Revolutionary Guard Corps (IRGC). From the mid-1990s until 2001, he commanded the Najaf Ashraf Base. He then served as commander of the Samen-ol-A'emeh Base from 2001 to 2004 while also leading the 5th Nasr Division and acting as the senior IRGC commander in Khorasan Province.

Between 2005 and 2012, he served as Deputy Commander of the Sarallah Headquarters, and from 2011 to 2016, he was the Deputy for Operations of the IRGC. From September 2016 until June 2025, he was Deputy for Operations of the General Staff of the Armed Forces of the Islamic Republic of Iran.

== Death ==
Rabbani was killed on 13 June 2025. His funeral, held on 28 June, was set to take place along with those of all the top commanders killed during the Twelve-Day War.

Military offices
Preceded by	Commander of the 4th Basij Division; 2001–?	Succeeded by Ali Shadmani
Preceded by Nour Ali Shoushtari	Commander of the Najaf Ashraf Base; Until 2001	Succeeded by
Preceded by	Commander of the 5th Nasr Division; 2001–2004	Succeeded by Ghodratollah Mansouri
Preceded by Hossein Hamadani	Commander of the Samen-ol-A'emeh Base; 2001–2004	
Preceded by	Deputy Commander of the Sarallah Headquarters; 2005–2012	Succeeded by Mohsen Kazemeini
Preceded by Mohsen Kazemeini	Deputy for Operations, IRGC; 2011–2016	Succeeded by Mohammadreza Zahedi
Preceded by Ali Shadmani	Deputy for Operations, General Staff of the Armed Forces of the Islamic Republic of Iran; 2016–2025	Vacant
