= 5th Nasr Division =

- Country: Islamic Republic of Iran
- Branch: Islamic Revolutionary Guard Corps
- Size: Division
- Engagements: Iran–Iraq War: First Battle of al-Faw

5th Nasr Division (Persian: لشکر 5 نصر, or lashkar-5-Nasr) is one of the Divisions of the Islamic Revolutionary Guard Corps. It is also known as the Sepah-e Nsar Corps.

== Formation and the Iran–Iraq War ==
The unit was formed from troops of Khorasan province in 1982 during the Iran–Iraq War before the preliminary moves of Operation Dawn. Its first commander was Hassan Bagheri Afshardi. Hassan Bagheri was in charge of the division for only 10 days before being killed in action. At the start of 1983, under the command of Morteza Ghorbani, the division took part in the capture of Mehran during Operation Dawn-3. The division went on to take part in Operations Badr, Memak, Dawn-8, Karbala 4 and Karbala 5. Commanders during this time included Esmail Qaani and Mohammad Bagher Qalibaf.

== Subsequent history ==
After the Iran–Iraq War, the unit was based in Mashhad, near the border with Afghanistan. Alongside the Hekmatyar network, under the leadership of Brigadier Gholamreza Baghban the division played a role in the exfiltration of Osama bin Laden's fighters and family from Afghanistan in the aftermath of the US invasion of Afghanistan in 2001.

== Former commanders ==
- Mohammad Bagher Qalibaf
- Morteza Ghorbani
- Esmail Qaani
- Nur-Ali Shushtari
- Mehdi Rabbani
- Qudratollah Mansouri
- Seyed Hassan Mortazavi
- Mojtaba Ghafoorpour
- Ahmad Shafaei
- Hassan Rajabzadeh
- Amin Rasouli
- Hadi Niyazi, current commander

== See also ==
- Operation Dawn-3.
- Dawn-8,
