= Mostafa Izadi =

Iranian military officer

Sardar Mostafa Izadi
- مصطفی ایزدی
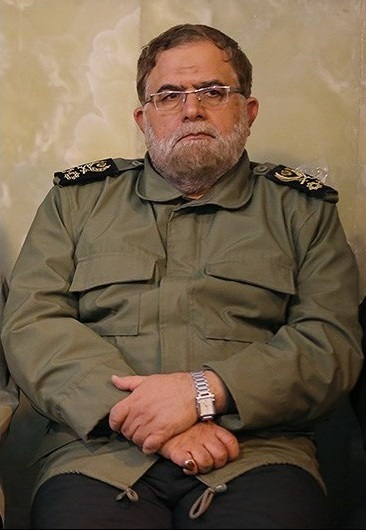
- Izadi in 2016

Deputy Commander-in-Chief of the Islamic Revolutionary Guard Corps
- Incumbent
- Assumed office 10 August 2026
- President: Masoud Pezeshkian
- Supreme Leader: Mojtaba Khamenei
- Preceded by: Ahmad Vahidi

Commander Cyber and New Threats Headquarters of the Khatam al-Anbiya Central Headquarters
- Incumbent
- Assumed office 2016
- President: Hassan Rouhani; Ebrahim Raisi; Mohammad Mokhber (acting); Masoud Pezeshkian
- Supreme Leader: Ali Khamenei; Mojtaba Khamenei

Deputy for Logistics of the General Staff
- Incumbent
- Assumed office 2015
- President: Hassan Rouhani; Ebrahim Raisi; Mohammad Mokhber (acting); Masoud Pezeshkian
- Supreme Leader: Ali Khamenei; Mojtaba Khamenei

Deputy for Strategic Affairs and General Oversight of the General Staff
- Incumbent
- Assumed office 2010
- President: Mahmoud Ahmadinejad; Hassan Rouhani; Ebrahim Raisi; Mohammad Mokhber (acting); Masoud Pezeshkian
- Supreme Leader: Ali Khamenei; Mojtaba Khamenei

Deputy for Planning, Program, and Budget of the General Staff
- In office 1993–2006
- President: Akbar Hashemi Rafsanjani; Mohammad Khatami; Mahmoud Ahmadinejad
- Supreme Leader: Ali Khamenei
- Preceded by: Hossein Amir-Moayyed
- Succeeded by: Saeed Mojarradi

Commander of the IRGC Ground Forces
- In office 24 September 1989 – 11 July 1992
- President: Akbar Hashemi Rafsanjani
- Supreme Leader: Ali Khamenei
- Preceded by: Yahya Rahim Safavi
- Succeeded by: Mohammad Ali Jafari

Deputy for Operations of the IRGC Ground Forces
- In office 1987 – 24 September 1989
- President: Ali Khamenei; Akbar Hashemi Rafsanjani
- Prime Minister: Mir-Hossein Mousavi
- Supreme Leader: Ruhollah Khomeini; Ali Khamenei

Personal details
- Born: 1956 (age 69–70) Najafabad, Pahlavi Iran

Military service
- Allegiance: Iran
- Branch/service: IRGC
- Years of service: 1979–present
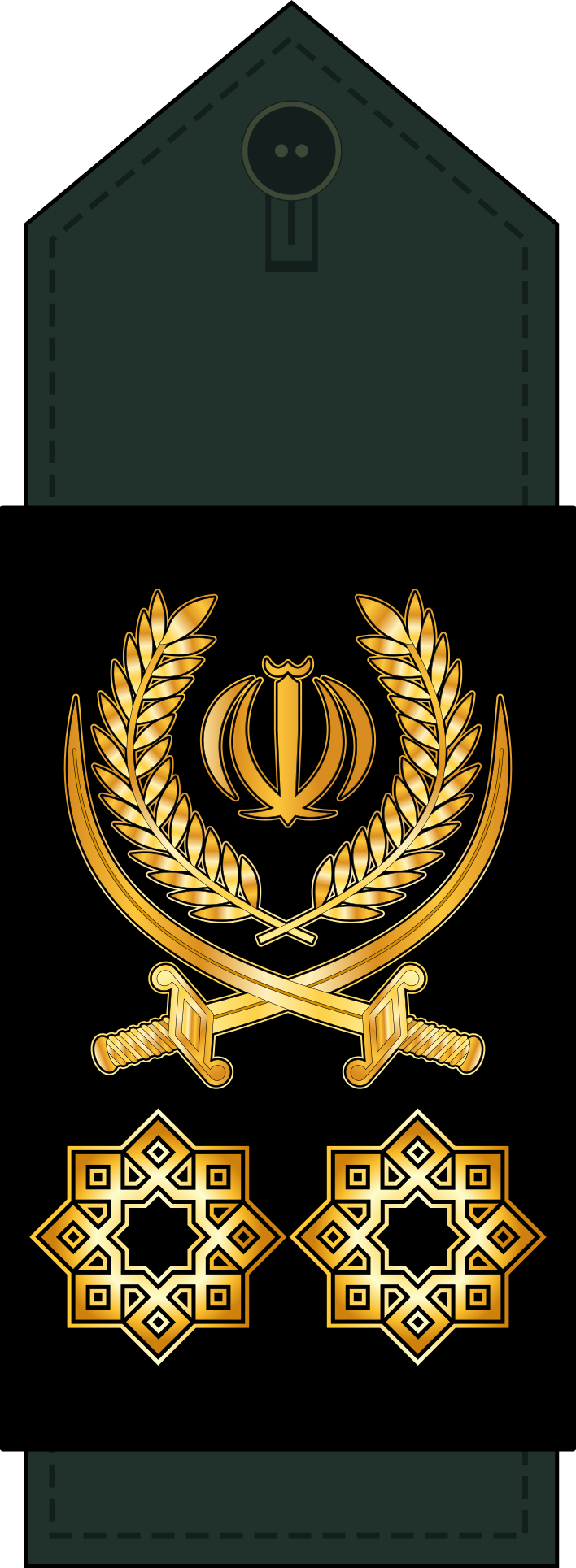
- Rank: Major General
- Unit: Ground Forces
- Commands: Najaf Ashraf Headquarters (1987–1985); Hamzah Sayyid al-Shuhada Headquarters (1985–1983); Commander of the IRGC in Kurdistan province (1982–1983)
- Battles/wars: Iran–Iraq War; KDPI insurgency (1989–1996); Insurgency in Sistan and Balochistan; Syrian civil war; Iranian intervention in Syria; War in Iraq (2013–2017); Iranian intervention in Iraq; Iran–PJAK conflict; Western Iran clashes; 2019–2021 Persian Gulf crisis; 2024 Iran–Israel conflict; Twelve-Day War; 2026 Iran war

Mostafa Izadi (Persian: مصطفی ایزدی) is a senior Iranian military officer in the Islamic Revolutionary Guard Corps (IRGC) who has served as the deputy commander-in-chief of the IRGC since 2026, holding the rank of major general. He previously served as commander of the IRGC Ground Forces.

As of 2015, he served as the Deputy Chief of Staff of the Iranian Armed Forces for Logistics.

In August 2026, he was appointed by Supreme Leader Mojtaba Khamenei as deputy commander of the IRGC.

== See also ==
- List of Iranian two-star generals since 1979

Military offices
Preceded by Ahmad Vahidi	Deputy Commander of the Islamic Revolutionary Guard Corps; 10 August 2026–present	Incumbent
Preceded by ?	Commander Cyber and New Threats Headquarters of the Khatam al-Anbiya Central Headquarters; 2016–present	Incumbent
Preceded by ?	Deputy for Logistics of the General Staff; 2015–present	Incumbent
New title	Deputy for Strategic Affairs and General Oversight of the General Staff; 2010–present	Incumbent
Preceded by Hossein Amir-Moayyed	Deputy for Planning, Program, and Budget of the General Staff; 1993–2006	Succeeded by Saeed Mojarradi
Preceded by Yahya Rahim Safavi	Commander of the Revolutionary Guards Ground Force; 24 September 1989–11 July 1992	Succeeded by Mohammad Ali Jafari
Preceded by ?	Deputy for Operations of the Islamic Revolutionary Guard Corps Ground Forces; 1987–24 September 1989	Succeeded by Ahmad Kazemi
Preceded by Mohammad Ali Jafari	Commander of Najaf Ashraf Headquarters; 1985–1987	Succeeded by Nur-Ali Shushtari
Preceded by Mohammad Ebrahim Sanjaghi	Commander of Hamzah Sayyid al-Shuhada Headquarters; 1983–1985	Succeeded by Hedayat Lotfian
Preceded by Naser Kazemi	Commander of the IRGC in Kurdistan province 1982–1983	Succeeded by ?
