= Operation Spider (Iran) =

The logo published by IRGC's Gerdab.ir alongside the statement

Operation Spider or Project Spider is a surveillance programme by Islamic Revolutionary Guard Corps (IRGC) to monitor Iranian internet users on social media such as Facebook. The operation was publicized in January 2015 with a statement by IRGC's "The Center for Investigation of Organized Crime". The program is said to be expanding to Instagram, Viber, and WhatsApp.

== 2015 Arrests ==
Since September 2014, the IRGC intensified its review of Facebook pages, and that 350 Facebook pages managed by 36 individuals had been identified and 130 of them deleted from Facebook.

In January 2015, 12 Iranian Facebook users were arrested and 24 other citizens were summoned to answer questions about their Facebook activities.

On January 31, a statement by the Center for Investigation of Organized Cyber Crimes was published that stated several Facebook users had been arrested in a surveillance project by the IRGC named "Operation Spider" that is aimed at identifying and rooting out Facebook pages and activities that spread "corruption" and western-inspired lifestyles. The statement also says they "received indirect and covert support from the Western governments and had targeted a remarkable number of Facebook users in the guise of cultural and social pages over a span of two years".

== 2016 arrests ==
In 2016, Operation Spider II was used to detect Iranian models posting images of themselves online not wearing a headscarf. The models were subsequently charged with "promoting western promiscuity". The Iranian models were arrested and forced to give public self-criticism for posting the pictures.
