= Mohammad Bagher Ghalibaf =

Iranian politician (born 1961)

Sardar Mohammad Bagher Ghalibaf
- محمدباقر قالیباف
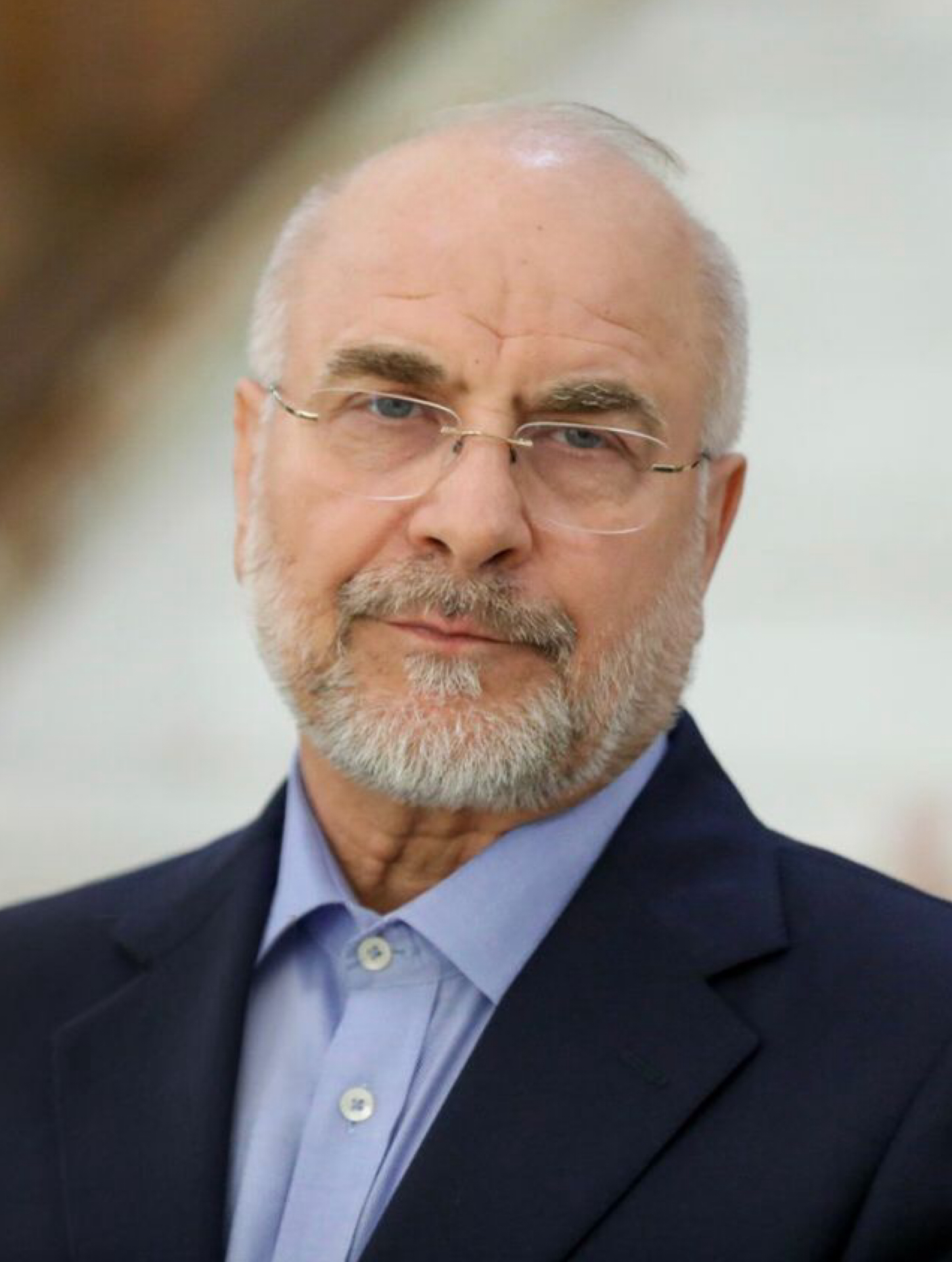
- Ghalibaf in 2025

6th Speaker of the Islamic Consultative Assembly
- Incumbent
- Assumed office 28 May 2020
- President: Hassan Rouhani; Ebrahim Raisi; Mohammad Mokhber (acting); Masoud Pezeshkian
- Deputy: First: Amir-Hossein Ghazizadeh; Ali Nikzad; Abdolreza Mesri; Hamid-Reza Haji Babaee; Second: Ali Nikzad; Abdolreza Mesri; Mojtaba Zonnour; Ali Nikzad
- Supreme Leader: Ali Khamenei; Mojtaba Khamenei
- Preceded by: Ali Larijani

Member of the Parliament of Iran
- Incumbent
- Assumed office 27 May 2024
- Constituency: Tehran, Rey, Shemiranat, Eslamshahr and Pardis
- In office 27 May 2020 – 26 May 2024
- Constituency: Tehran, Rey, Shemiranat, Eslamshahr and Pardis

Member of Expediency Discernment Council
- In office 14 August 2017 – 28 May 2020
- Appointed by: Ali Khamenei
- President: Hassan Rouhani
- Supreme Leader: Ali Khamenei
- Chairman: Mahmoud Hashemi Shahroudi; Sadeq Larijani
- Succeeded by: Ali Larijani

43rd Mayor of Tehran
- In office 14 September 2005 – 27 August 2017
- President: Mahmoud Ahmadinejad; Hassan Rouhani
- Deputy: Issa Sharifi
- Supreme Leader: Ali Khamenei
- Preceded by: Mahmoud Ahmadinejad
- Succeeded by: Mohammad-Ali Najafi

Head of the Central Headquarters for Combating Goods and Currency Smuggling
- In office 8 June 2004 – 1 September 2005
- President: Mohammad Khatami; Mahmoud Ahmadinejad
- Supreme Leader: Ali Khamenei
- Preceded by: Office established
- Succeeded by: Mohammad Reza Naqdi

Chief of the Iranian Police
- In office 27 June 2000 – 28 June 2005
- President: Mohammad Khatami
- Supreme Leader: Ali Khamenei
- Preceded by: Hedayat Lotfian
- Succeeded by: Ali Abdollahi Aliabadi

4th Commander of the IRGC Aerospace Force
- In office 30 October 1997 – 4 April 2000
- President: Mohammad Khatami
- Supreme Leader: Ali Khamenei
- Preceded by: Mohammad Hossein Jalali
- Succeeded by: Ahmad Kazemi

Personal details
- Born: 23 August 1961 (age 65) Torqabeh, Pahlavi Iran
- Party: Progress and Justice Population of Islamic Iran (Spiritual leader)
- Other political affiliations: Coalition Council of Islamic Revolution Forces (2020); Popular Front of Islamic Revolution Forces (2017)
- Spouse: Zahra-Sadat Moshir-Estekhareh (m. 1982)
- Children: 3
- Education: University of Tehran (BSc); Islamic Azad University (MSc); Tarbiat Modares University (PhD)
- Awards: Order of Fath (2nd grade); Order of Fath (3rd grade)
- Website: Official website

Military service
- Allegiance: Iran
- Branch/service: IRGC
- Years of service: 1981–2005
- Rank: Brigadier General
- Unit: Aerospace Force
- Commands: Khatam al-Anbiya Construction HQ (1994–1997); 25th Karbala Division (1988–1994); 5th Nasr Division (1983–1987); 21st Imam Reza Armored Brigade (1982–1984)
- Battles/wars: 1979 Kurdish Rebellion; Iran–Iraq War; Insurgency in Sistan and Balochistan; Iran–PJAK conflict

Mohammad Bagher Ghalibaf (Note: Persian: محمدباقر قالیباف, romanized: Mohammad Bâqer Qâlibâf) (born 23 August 1961) is an Iranian politician, pilot, and former Islamic Revolutionary Guard Corps (IRGC) brigadier general, who has served as Speaker of the Parliament of Iran since 2020. As of April 2026, he has been described as handling the strategic matters of Iran.

Ghalibaf began his military career in 1980 during the Iran–Iraq War. He became chief commander of the IRGC Imam Reza Brigade in 1982, and was then chief commander of the IRGC 5th Nasr Division from 1983 to 1984. After the war, in 1994 he became Managing Director of Khatam al-Anbiya Construction Headquarters, a major engineering firm controlled by the IRGC. From 1997 to 2000, he was the commander of the IRGC Air Force. From 2000 to 2005, he was the chief of the Law Enforcement Force, during which time he was accused of ruthless violent suppression of protestors, arrests of intellectuals and journalists, and imposing a strict morality and hijab edict on the citizens of Iran.

In 2005, Ghalibaf was elected mayor of Tehran by the Islamic City Council of Tehran, a position that he held until 2017. While mayor, he completed numerous high-profile construction projects in Tehran, including Iran's tallest building, the Milad Tower, but was also accused of being implicated in corruption scandals including the below-market-value sale of properties in northern Tehran to regime officials. An Iranian Principlist, he was a member of the Expediency Discernment Council from 2017 to 2020.

In the 2020 Iranian legislative election, the conservative Iranian Principlists regained the majority in the legislature, and Ghalibaf was elected as the new Speaker of the Parliament of Iran. Today Ghalibaf and his family own multiple luxury apartments in Istanbul, Turkey. During the 2025–2026 Iranian protests, he called for the punishment of protestors, whom he called enemies and terrorists. He was described by Time as having a reputation for sycophancy and corruption. Ghalibaf has been a perennial candidate in the Iranian presidential elections, having stood unsuccessfully for the office four times, never garnering more than 17% of the vote.

== Early life and education ==
Ghalibaf was born on 23 August 1961 in Torqabeh, a city near Mashhad, in the province of Razavi Khorasan in north-eastern Iran. His father, Hossein Ghalibaf, was of Kurdish origin, while his mother, Kheirolnessa Boujmehrani, was of Persian origin. His mixed ancestry was typical in Khorasan, a majority Persian region. In 2026, the Iranian opposition media outlet IRBriefing claimed that "Ghalibaf’s mother comes from Khameneh in Iranian-Azerbaijan, the ancestral village of the now-deceased former leader Ayatollah Khamenei", although it was not verified. His early life before the revolution in 1979 was largely undocumented. His father worked as a grocer in Mashhad. He had a brother, Hassan Ghalibaf, who was killed during Iran-Iraq war.

Ghalibaf has a bachelor's degree in human geography from Tehran University, a master's in human geography from Islamic Azad University and a PhD in political geography from Tarbiat Modares University.

As a teenager in the early 1970s, Ghalibaf first showed an interest in religious politics "by attending sermons given by Imam Khamenei and other rebellious, hard-line clerics like Abdolkarim Hasheminejad at a mosque in Mashhad, in north-eastern Iran."

== Military career ==
=== Islamic Revolutionary Guard Corps ===
At the age of 19, Ghalibaf was one of the commanders of the Islamic Revolutionary Guard Corps (IRGC) forces during the Iran–Iraq War. Shortly afterwards he was named commander of the 21st Imam Reza Armored Brigade. At age 22, in 1983 he was commander of the 5th Nasr Division.

After the war he was selected as Deputy Commander of the IRGC Basij Resistance Force and Troops under General Alireza Afshar. Ghalibaf became one of the senior commanders of the IRGC in later years. He received the title of Major General in 1996, after he completed a master's degree in geopolitics.

=== Khatam al-Anbiya Construction Headquarters ===
From 1994 through 1997, he was head of the Khatam al-Anbiya Construction Headquarters, which is the engineering arm of the IRGC. Under his management, the headquarters launched a railway connecting Mashhad to Sarakhs.

=== Revolutionary Guard Air Force ===
In 1997, when Yahya Rahim Safavi took over as the IRGC's new commander-in-chief, Ghalibaf was named Commander of the Aerospace Force of the Islamic Revolutionary Guard Corps. He held the position until 2000.

During his tenure as Commander, there was a clash between the IRGC Air Force and the Artesh-controlled Shiraz Air Base. Brigadier General Shahram Rostami explained that, contrary to explicit orders from the Supreme Commander, the IRGC Air Force attempted to seize part of the air base, which led to a military confrontation between the two forces and the death of an Artesh soldier from the air base. Following this incident, the Judiciary and the General Staff of the Armed Forces of the Islamic Republic of Iran interrogated Rostami, but did not question Ghalibaf, who avoided accountability.

==== Threatening letter to President Khatami ====
As Commander of the IRGC Air Force during the 1999 pro-democracy student protests, Ghalibaf was one of the 24 IRGC commanders who sent a threatening letter to the reformist president Mohammad Khatami, stating that if the protests were not crushed, they would take matters into their own hands. The letter received significant attention, with many interpreting it as a direct threat to the presidency of the Islamic Republic.

== Chief of Police ==
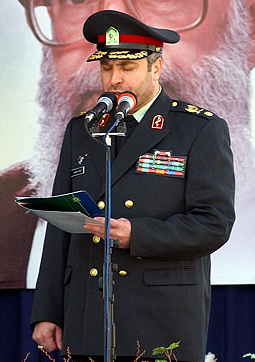
Ghalibaf in 2004 in Amin Police Academy

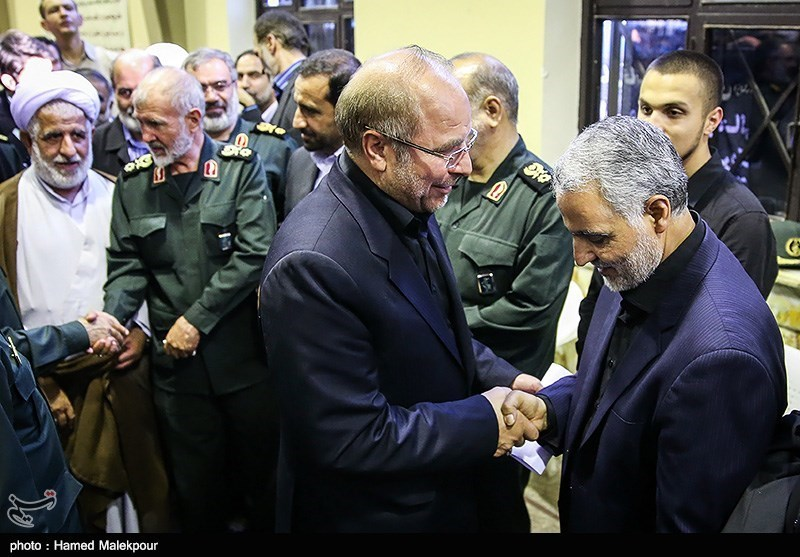
Ghalibaf and General Qasem Soleimani, 2013

Following the 1999 protests, he was appointed Chief of the Law Enforcement Force by the Supreme Leader of Iran, Ali Khamenei, to succeed Brigadier General Hedayat Lotfian. Ghalibaf then initiated some reforms in the forces, including dropping all lawsuits against newspapers, modernization of police equipment and the Police 110 project, establishing an emergency police telephone number.

Secretary of the Supreme National Security Council Hassan Rouhani said that during the 2003 Iranian student protests and the attack on the Tarasht dormitory, Ghalibaf said: "Students should come so we can use gas to finish the job." The Kalameh website releasaed an audio recording of Ghalibaf saying: "I will 'crush' anyone who comes to the dormitory to do these things." On 5 April 2005, Ghalibaf submitted his resignation from the military positions (including the police forces) due to his intention to run for the presidency of Iran.

=== Suppression of protests ===
During the 2013 presidential election debates, the issue of plainclothes officers confronting students during the 2003 Tehran unrest and the attack on the Tarasht dormitory was raised between Ghalibaf and Hassan Rouhani. Rouhani revealed Ghalibaf's intent to suppress the students, quoting him as saying: "Students should come so we can use gas to finish the job." Rouhani emphasized that a more transparent approach would be to either deny permission for protests or make the terms clear from the start.

Additionally, a 15 May 2013 report on the Kalameh website revealed an audio recording of Ghalibaf during a Supreme National Security Council meeting, where he threatened to allow law enforcement forces to enter universities and use force, stating: "I will 'crush' anyone who comes to the dormitory to do these things."

=== Arrest of intellectuals and journalists ===
In 2002 and 2004, the police summoned dozens of intellectuals, journalists, political activists, news website managers, and bloggers—including figures like Aydin Aghdashloo, Houshang Golmakani, Houshang Asadi, Massoumeh Seyhoun, Bahram Beyzai, Younes Shokrkhah, Kaveh Golestan, Nasser Zarafshan, Noshabeh Amiri, Farhad Behbahani, Abbas Kosha, Hanif Mazrouei, Farid Modaresi, and Behrouz Gharibpour—to the precinct office for interrogation or temporary detention. Some, such as journalist and film critic Siamak Pourzand, were held for months. The police also provided Judge Mortazavi with a special detention center in Tehran’s Youth Square for the interrogation of the arrested individuals. Ahmad Masjed-Jamei, the Minister of Culture and Islamic Guidance, along with the Writers' Association of Iran, protested these arrests. A few weeks later, Ghalibaf publicly stated that these individuals had either acted against national security or were involved in promoting cultural vulgarity. He claimed that they had formed a widespread network to distribute obscene films, from which more than 13,000 illicit compact discs were seized.

In 2002, Ghalibaf commented on Siamak Pourzand’s arrest, stating, "Pourzand had engaged in a series of anti-cultural activities that fell outside the framework of the Islamic system. Through connections his ex-wife and daughter had with Reza Pahlavi, he had been supplying Reza Pahlavi with information from inside the country, which led to the matter being raised with Mr. Khatami, the head of the National Security Council."

During this period, the police force was portrayed by reformists as a key component of a parallel intelligence apparatus.

=== Moral Security Plan ===
In October 2002, Ghalibaf announced that he would present the moral security plan and stated: "The law enforcement force, together with the elites of other institutions, is responsible for defining and explaining moral security, and for enforcing its requirements against violators. The will and orders of the Supreme Leader reflect the will of the general public."

In 2004, he commented on moral security, saying: "At times, when discussing improper hijab, the political significance of the issue may outweigh its moral significance. What I want to emphasize is that we should raise our perspective and examine the issue more thoroughly. First and foremost, we need to draw a clear distinction between proper hijab and improper hijab based on the regulations, as this is a fundamental requirement for civic life."

== Mayor of Tehran ==
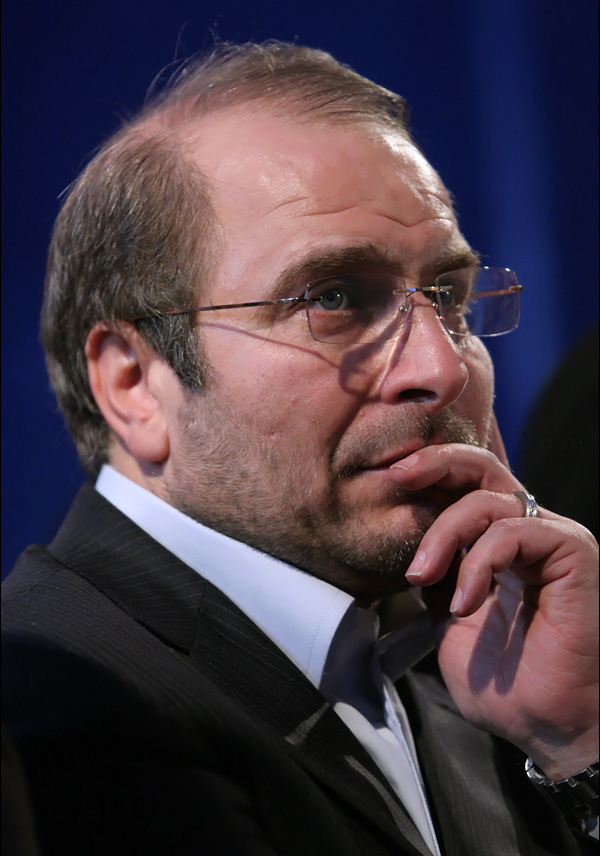
Ghalibaf

When Ghalibaf lost the 2005 presidential election, he was proposed as Mayor of Tehran along with Mohammad Aliabadi and Mohammad-Ali Najafi. On 4 September 2005, he was elected as the next Mayor by the City Council of Tehran to succeed Mahmoud Ahmadinejad who left the office after being elected president. He received 8 out of 15 votes of the council. He was reelected for a second term on 2007 after receiving 12 votes with no opponent.

According to Bloomberg, he used his position as mayor "to foster a reputation as a politician who gets things done." Ghalibaf vowed to expand Tehran Metro by building a new "metro station every month". While Tehran's subway network was indeed rapidly enlarged under Ghalibaf's leadership, the breakneck speed of its expansion caused significant problems for commuters, as the "system ran out of rolling stock to adequately service the new stations." According to reports by Iranian opposition media, the subway expansion project may also have had a military dual use, allegedly serving as cover for the construction of underground bunkers for the political leadership of the Islamic Republic of Iran; it was claimed that "workers who thought they were building metro tunnels for the municipality were in fact unwittingly duped into also constructing the Ayatollahs’ bunkers."

Ghalibaf's signature project as mayor of Tehran was the completion of the long stalled construction works on the skyline defining Milad Tower, which was completed within three years of Ghalibaf taking office.

Ghalibaf sought reelection as Mayor of Tehran as the Iranian principlists' choice in the 2013 local elections. His rivals were Mohsen Hashemi Rafsanjani, Masoumeh Ebtekar, Ali Nikzad and Mohsen Mehralizadeh. He was elected as Mayor for another term on 8 September 2013 after defeating Hashemi in a runoff with 51.6% of the votes.

During Ghalibaf's second term as mayor, a range of pro-business reforms culminated in the construction of numerous new shopping centres and real estate developments. "Iran Mall, the construction of which reportedly began in 2011 when Ghalibaf was mayor, is now the biggest shopping centre in the world."

As mayor, Ghalibaf was accused of being connected to corruption scandals involving the under-market-value sale of properties in northern Tehran to regime officials. During his mayorship he initiated the construction of road tunnels and artificial lakes in affluent north Tehran and was criticized for neglecting the poorer south of Tehran. Some Analysts believe that the prominent discussion, by official media in Iran, of corruption allegations against the Tehran Mayor's Office under Ghalibaf's leadership "may have been a form of institutional blowback: Sour grapes from other factions within the regime who felt threatened by the capital city’s growing financial autonomy and visible prosperity."

== Financial corruption ==
=== Scandal over transfer of municipal properties ===
In September 2016, Shargh newspaper reported on the transfer of municipal properties to certain city managers at heavily discounted prices. Following this, the Memari News website published a letter from the Islamic Inspectorate Organization of the country, revealing the names and details of the discounts offered to dozens of individuals and several cooperatives by the municipality. As a result of this report, the editor of the Memari News website was imprisoned after being sued by Ghalibaf and Mehdi Chamran. The allegations published in the report highlighted the transfer and sale of properties and lands—intended for residential, commercial, administrative, and service use—that belonged to the public property of the Tehran Municipality. These properties, totaling more than 100,000 square meters, were sold to managers, deputies, council members, and several individuals at discounted prices, which was considered a violation. The report emphasized that applying 50% discounts on expert valuations, as well as unrealistic property assessments for individuals outside the municipality, led to a waste of public resources. The average price per square meter of these properties was estimated at two million Iranian tomans, resulting in a loss of over 2,200 billion tomans of public property from the Tehran Municipality.

Former Tehran mayor Mohammad-Ali Najafi announced the transfer of some lands in the Abbas Abad district of Tehran to a military institution, explaining that since the contract had already been signed, the transfer could not be legally blocked. He stated that more than 670 municipal properties had been transferred to individuals and institutions, often at their discretion. Najafi, who was summarizing the investigation report on the performance of his predecessor—Ghalibaf, said that he would report some confidential matters separately to the city council members. Ghalibaf had previously been accused by city council members of financial corruption during his tenure.

In the course of exposing certain violations during Ghalibaf's administration, journalist and Ghalibaf critic Yashar Soltani was imprisoned. Later, the Attorney General of Iran confirmed that 45 individuals had received properties from the municipality "outside the legal framework," though he said that there was no evidence of organized corruption.

=== Two thousand violations in the transfer ===
Mahmoud Mirlohi, a member of the Tehran City Council, emphasized in an interview with Etemad newspaper that the initial report on these properties referred to the illegal transfer of 674 properties. However, subsequent investigations revealed that the number had increased to more than 2,000 properties. The case regarding these astronomical properties remains open. According to Mirlohi, Pirouz Hanachi, the mayor of Tehran, was expected to soon address the behind-the-scenes details surrounding the transfer of 41 properties from the astronomical properties complex.

Mirlohi also stated that, in addition to former Tehran municipality officials, some former members of the city council were involved in the transfer of these astronomical properties. In the interview with Etemad, he further noted that the astronomical properties case has effectively "disappeared" within the judiciary.

=== Repossession of some properties from the IRGC ===
In an interview with Etemad newspaper, Mirlohi also reported that, over the past two weeks, a number of municipal properties that had been "unaccountably transferred to Rasa Tejarat" in connection with the astronomical property case have now been reclaimed. Rasa Tejarat Mobin, which is affiliated with the Revolutionary Guards Cooperative Foundation, has been linked in recent years to a financial case involving the Tehran Municipality. According to members of the Tehran City Council, this company owes the municipality a total of four trillion tomans under its contracts, yet has failed to repay the debt.

=== Financial irregularities in 2014 ===
The report outlines several widespread violations by the Tehran Municipality in 2014, including: “The payment of 60 billion tomans in aid and the granting of land measuring 70,000, 7,000, and 3,000 square meters to the Imam Reza Charity, owned by Ghalibaf’s wife,” “47 secret bank accounts,” “the judiciary’s debt of 229.7 billion tomans to the municipality and its failure to repay it,” “the municipality’s demand of 497 billion tomans from the Revolutionary Guards Cooperative Foundation,” and “the purchase and sale of a metro station.”

=== Accused of concluding fictitious contract for use in election advertising ===
On 15 January 2017, Mohammad Ali Najafi stated: "Mohammad Bagher Ghalibaf, the former mayor of Tehran and a candidate in the 12th presidential election, signed two contracts worth a total of 1.43 billion tomans ($366,000, based on the dollar exchange rate of 3,900 tomans in 2017). Upon further investigation, we found that while this amount was indeed deposited into the account of the aforementioned company, only 173 million tomans were given to the company. The rest of the funds were deposited into another account belonging to the head of the office of one of the former deputy mayors, and this money was later used for election purposes. Meanwhile, the individual listed on the account at the company affiliated with the police admitted in writing that out of the 173 million tomans, only 20 million belonged to him, while the rest was distributed among others.

Paying bribe of 65 billion tomans to prevent investigation

On 16 March 2016, some members of parliament initiated a plan to investigate the Tehran Municipality, but they ultimately failed to secure the necessary votes. Ghalibaf then thanked the parliamentarians for rejecting the investigation.

On 20 July 2020, Mostafa Mir-Salim, a member of parliament from Tehran, revealed that an investigation was planned in 2016 to examine the performance of the Tehran Municipality during Ghalibaf’s tenure as mayor. However, the investigation was halted due to a vote of opposition from parliament members. Mirsalim claimed that a bribe of 65 billion tomans was used to stop the investigation. Before this, Mirsalim had stated that the bribe had been paid to the head of a parliamentary commission. He had submitted documents related to the 65 billion tomans bribe to the judiciary.

=== Issa Sharifi case ===
Throughout Ghalibaf's 12-year tenure as mayor, Issa Sharifi was one of his closest associates, serving as his deputy mayor for 10 years. He also stepped in as acting mayor of Tehran twice when Ghalibaf ran for president. After the composition of the Tehran City Council changed and corruption allegations started to surface regarding the Tehran Municipality, Sharifi left the country. He was arrested upon his return in connection with a case involving "serious financial corruption" during his time as mayor.

=== Plasco Building fire ===
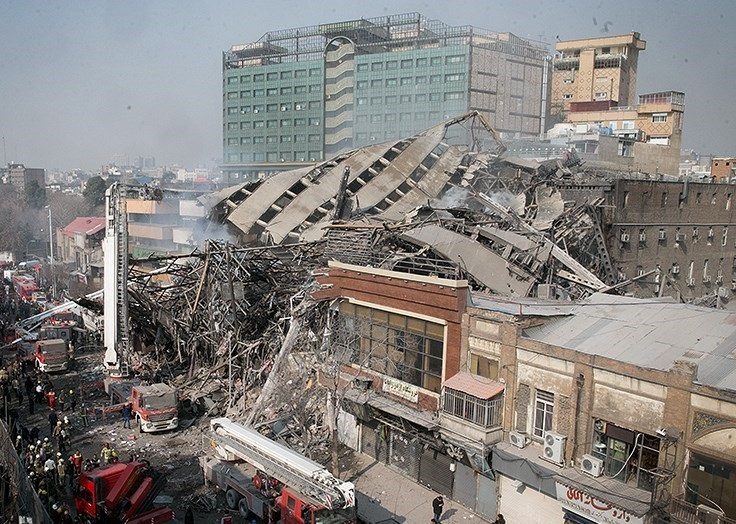
Collapsed Plasco Building

On the morning of Friday, 20 January 2017, a massive fire broke out at the Plasco Building, located at Istanbul Crossroads in central Tehran, which ultimately led to its complete collapse. The fire spread quickly, and firefighters attempted to contain it, but 20 of them lost their lives in the process. Following the incident, the Tehran Municipality, under Ghalibaf's leadership, faced accusations of negligence. Among the widespread criticisms were claims of "inability to manage the crisis," "failure to allocate sufficient budget to the fire department," "issuing only one warning to the Plasco building," and "focusing on removing superficial debris rather than searching for survivors." In response to this, Tehran City Councilman Mohsen Sorkhou described the city's crisis management as "zero."

On 13 February, Ghalibaf presented a report on the incident during an open session of the Parliament of Iran, defending the municipality's actions. He stated: "The fire brigade arrived at the Plasco building in less than two and a half minutes after the fire was reported. We had no equipment issues, and the facilities were adequate." However, his statement was interrupted by Gholam Ali Jafarzadeh, a representative from Rasht, who accused Ghalibaf of lying about the fire brigade's response time.

Interior Minister Abdolreza Rahmani Fazli also provided a different account after the Plasco disaster, stating: "The fire brigade arrived five minutes after the fire started, left due to a lack of equipment, and returned 15 minutes later." In the days following the incident, numerous reports from eyewitnesses, fire officers, and experts highlighted deficiencies and equipment failures, revealing the inaccuracies in Ghalibaf's statements.

Ghalibaf's meeting on 7 February at the Tehran City Council to review the Plasco incident was met with strong criticism from council members. During the meeting, he apologized to the public for his "inefficiency in crisis management" and emphasized that it was the responsibility of the judiciary to judge and adjudicate the Plasco incident.

=== Management record ===
The BBC News Agency, in a summary report of Ghalibaf's management period, highlighted the following issues:

- Withdrew 1.25 billion tomans for the elections through the signing of two contracts.
- Invested the assets of the municipal employees' reserve fund in a corrupt project.
- Increased land subsidence caused by excessive extraction of water from Tehran’s wells.
- The municipality's debt of approximately 50 trillion tomans, which was three times the then-current budget.
- Hired 13,000 people ahead of the presidential elections.

== Speaker of the Parliament ==
In the 2020 Iranian legislative election, the conservative Iranian Principlists regained the majority in the legislature, and Ghalibaf was elected as the new Speaker of the Parliament of Iran.

During the 2025–2026 Iranian protests, he called for punishment against protestors, whom he called enemies and terrorists. He was described by Time as having a reputation for sycophancy and corruption.

=== 2026 Iran war ===
Following the outbreak of war between Israel, the United States and Iran on 28 February 2026, Ghalibaf emerged as one of the most powerful figures in Iran's wartime leadership structure. Ghalibaf was regarded as the de facto co-leader of Iran along with IRGC Brigadier General Ali Larijani, who had headed the Supreme National Security Council since August 2025. Reportedly the IRGC supported Larijani's and Ghalibaf's de facto co-leadership. Larijani was killed two weeks after the war began.

After the killing of Ali Larijani on 17 March 2026, Ghalibaf quietly assumed responsibility for strategic decision making, according to three senior Iranian officials. Iran's government during this period has been described as operating through a diffuse committee structure rather than a clear chain of command, with Ghalibaf handling strategic matters, IRGC commander-in-chief Brigadier General Ahmad Vahidi leading the tactical war effort, and President Masoud Pezeshkian managing day-to-day state functions. Analysts have described the Islamic Republic as operating as a "networked survival machine" with authority spread across overlapping institutions in response to sustained Israeli targeting of Iran's senior leadership. Shortly after taking his position as the head of the Supreme National Security Council, Ghalibaf threatened the US that Iran would target US troops stationed in the region. According to an insider, Ghalibaf acts only with approval from Iran's supreme leader Mojtaba Khamenei.

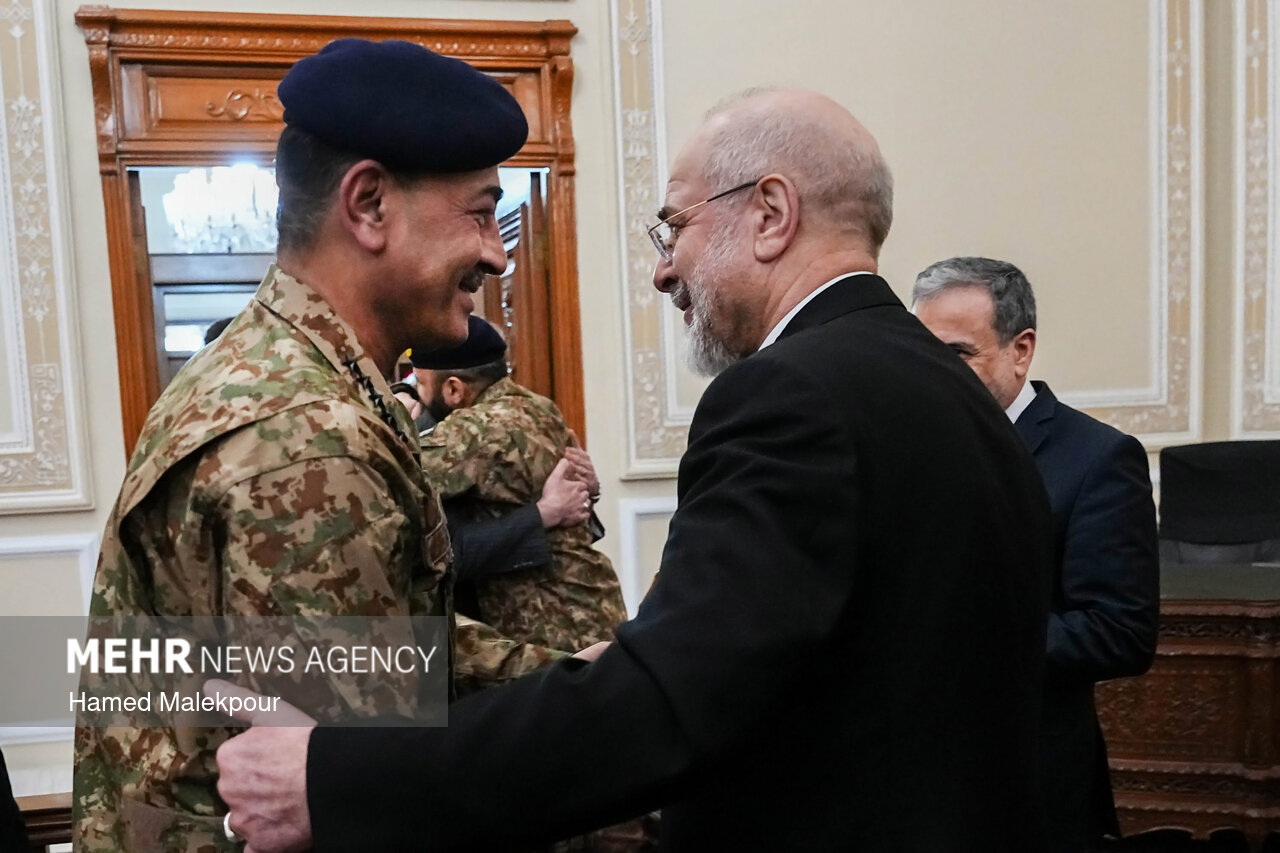
Chief of Pakistani Defence Forces Asim Munir and Ghalibaf, 16 April 2026

On 29 March 2026, Ghalibaf rejected the ongoing negotiations with the United States, saying that Iran could not be forced into submission. On 5 April, he called US President Donald Trump's threats to strike Iranian infrastructure 'reckless.' On 8 April, he said that the two-week 2026 Iran war ceasefire had been violated, and argued that "a bilateral ceasefire or negotiations is unreasonable." On 9 April, he said that "time is running out" for the ceasefire to be viable. On 11 April he led the Iranian delegation in ceasefire talks with a U.S. delegation led by U.S. Vice President JD Vance, hosted by Pakistan in Islamabad. On 21 April, the Institute for the Study of War reported a major disagreement between Ghalibaf and IRGC commander-in-chief Ahmad Vahidi, with Ghalibaf favoring participating in negotiations with the US and Vahidi opposing participation. On 17 May, Ghalibaf was appointed as the special representative for China, proposed by president Masoud Pezeshkian and supported by supreme leader Mojtaba Khamenei. On 13 June, Iranian hardliners chanted against Iranian Foreign Minister Abbas Araghchi and Ghalibaf as they protested the deal with the United States outside the Iran Foreign Ministry office. During the State funeral of Ali Khamenei, Ghalibaf and Araghchi were harassed by mourners.

== Controversies and scandals ==
=== Allegations of corruption ===
==== Yas Holding Company case ====
Ghalibaf has been accused of using his influence as a former IRGC commander to cover up corruption scandals that took place in Tehran during his term as mayor. One such scandal, which took place in 2017, involved the Yas Holding Company, a company whose board is partially made up of IRGC generals. The company was accused of embezzling an estimated 13 trillion tomans (US$3 billion) from Tehran Municipality for overpriced infrastructure projects built by construction companies linked to the IRGC during Ghalibaf's mayorship. In early 2022, a leaked audio recording was published by Radio Farda, which purported to show former IRGC Major General Mohammad Ali Jafari and Brigadier General Sadegh Zolghadr-Nia discussing the Yas Holding Company case, mentioning Ghalibaf's efforts to cover up the scandal by using his connections to the IRGC, by enlisting the support of Hossein Taeb, the head of the IRGC's Intelligence Organization.

==== "LayetteGate," luxury apartments in Istanbul, and seeking Canadian permanent residency ====
In April 2022, photos were published on Twitter that showed Ghalibaf's wife, Zahra Sadat Moshirand, and members of Ghalibaf's family at Tehran Imam Khomeini International Airport, returning from a luxury shopping trip in Turkey with 20 pieces of luggage, which were said to be a layette for their newborn child. The scandal, dubbed LayetteGate or SismuniGate by Iranian Twitter users, led to calls for him to step down as speaker of Parliament, with critics accusing Ghalibaf of being out of touch for his family shopping overseas during an economic crisis, and hypocrisy, pointing to comments made during his 2017 presidential campaign, where he criticized a former minister for traveling to Italy to purchase baby clothes.

The criticism of Ghalibaf's family escalated when further allegations were made by an Iranian journalist based in Turkey that Ghalibaf's wife, daughter and son-in-law had purchased two luxury apartments in Istanbul worth 400 billion rials (US$1.6 million).

Another scandal concerned Ghalibaf's son, Eshagh Ghalibaf, who had made "repeated enquiries" to obtain Canadian permanent residency. When this came to light Iranians joined a petition asking the Canadian government not to grant the younger Ghalibaf a visa. His son reportedly claimed to have $150,000 in funds available to support his application. In February 2024, Canadian Minister of Immigration, Refugees and Citizenship Marc Miller wrote on X: "On Feb. 6th, the permanent residency application of Eshagh Ghalibaf, the son of Iran’s Speaker of Parliament, Mohammad Bagher Ghalibaf, was refused. The Iranian regime has engaged in acts of terrorism and systemic human rights violations. We stand with the people of Iran."

All these scandals, however, did not stop Ghalibaf running for parliamentary election in 2024, and staying as speaker of the house in the Islamic Republic's parliament.

=== Involvement in violent crackdowns on protesters ===
Ghalibaf has a long-documented history of involvement in the violent suppression of civil unrest in Iran, spanning his tenures in the Islamic Revolutionary Guard Corps (IRGC), the National Police (NAJA), and as Speaker of the Parliament.

==== 1999 Student Protests ====
During the July 1999 student protests, Ghalibaf served as the commander of the IRGC Air Force. He was one of 24 high-ranking IRGC commanders who signed a threatening letter to then-President Mohammad Khatami, stating that the military would intervene if the government did not crush the student movement. The resultant violence around the protests saw many people killed, hundreds wounded and thousands arrested.

In a leaked 2013 audio recording, Ghalibaf admitted to personally participating in street-level violence, stating: "Photographs of me are available showing me on the back of a motorbike... beating [protesters] with wooden sticks." He further expressed pride in his role as a "club-wielder" despite his high military rank.

==== 2003 Student Protests ====
In 2003, while serving as the Chief of the National Police, Ghalibaf was involved in the crackdown on renewed student demonstrations at Tehran University. In the same 2013 leaked recording, he boasted of bypassing Supreme National Security Council protocols to order the use of gunfire against protestors. He recounted "raising hell" at a Council meeting to secure permission for police to enter university dormitories and to "shoot" at protesters.

==== 2009 Green Movement protests ====
As Mayor of Tehran during the 2009 Green Movement Iranian presidential election protests, Ghalibaf's administration supported the security crackdown. He later claimed his office was "ranked third" among government institutions for its effectiveness in responding to what officials termed the "sedition." While attempting to project a more "technocratic" image during this period, he defended the use of force as necessary for maintaining order.

==== 2025–26 Iranian anti-regime protests ====
Counties in Iran where protests had been reported as of 6 February 2026 highlighted in orange

Ghalibaf, as Speaker of the Islamic Consultative Assembly of Iran, was a prominent government figure in the state response to the 2025–2026 Iranian protests, which human rights groups and international media organisations described as a brutal crackdown and massacre of demonstrators, resulting in over 12,000 deaths. The killing was carried out on the direct order of Supreme Leader Ali Khamenei, with the explicit knowledge and approval of the heads of all three branches of government, and with an order for live fire issued by the Supreme National Security Council, of which Ghalibaf was a member.

Reports by human-rights advocates note that Iranian authorities deployed lethal force, imposed nationwide internet shutdowns, and arrested tens of thousands of protesters after demonstrations began in late December 2025 and escalated in early 2026, with estimates of civilian deaths ranging widely and described by some commentators as massacres under cover of communication blackouts. Critics and international observers highlighted the role of state institutions in planning and executing the security response. Ghalibaf publicly characterised the government's measures as a "war against terrorists" and defended the actions of security forces, framing the unrest as violent and foreign-influenced, a position that aligned him with hard-line elements of the response. Ghalibaf rejected external criticism and denied systematic abuses, while international bodies called for independent investigations into the security actions taken during the protests. Ghalibaf portrayed protestors as enemies "engaged in terrorist warfare." He said the enemies of Iran use "ISIS style techniques". Ghalibaf called protestors "seditionists" and said their acts were terrorism.

== Party affiliation ==
Ghalibaf is regarded as the spiritual leader behind Progress and Justice Population of Islamic Iran and Iranian Islamic Freedom Party. He is a member of the political alliance Popular Front of Islamic Revolution Forces.

== Presidential campaigns ==
Ghalibaf is often regarded as a perennial candidate in the presidential elections, having stood unsuccessfully for the office four times.

=== 2005 presidential election ===
Ghalibaf was a candidate in the Iranian presidential election of 2005, and was being considered to be supported by some factions of the conservative alliance because of his popularity with both wings. However, in the final days before the election, the major support went to Mahmoud Ahmadinejad. Ghalibaf came fourth in the election. He made a populist appeal during the campaigns.

On 13 October 2008, he announced his support for dialogue with the United States as suggested by then-presidential candidate Barack Obama. According to Ghalibaf, "the world community, the Iranian society and the US society would benefit" from such talks.

=== 2013 presidential election ===
Ghalibaf did not run for presidency in the elections in 2009.

His adviser announced that he would take part in the presidential elections in June 2013 and he officially announced this on 16 July 2012. After registering for the 2013 presidential election, Ghalibaf made controversial remarks about the 8 July 1999 Iranian student protests. He claimed that he had been riding a 1,000-kilometer motorcycle and using sticks to beat protesters on the streets. In his speech during the announcement of his candidacy, he said: “That's two things I still stand on and would seriously consider, first: the Constitution and second: respect the prisoners and detainees."

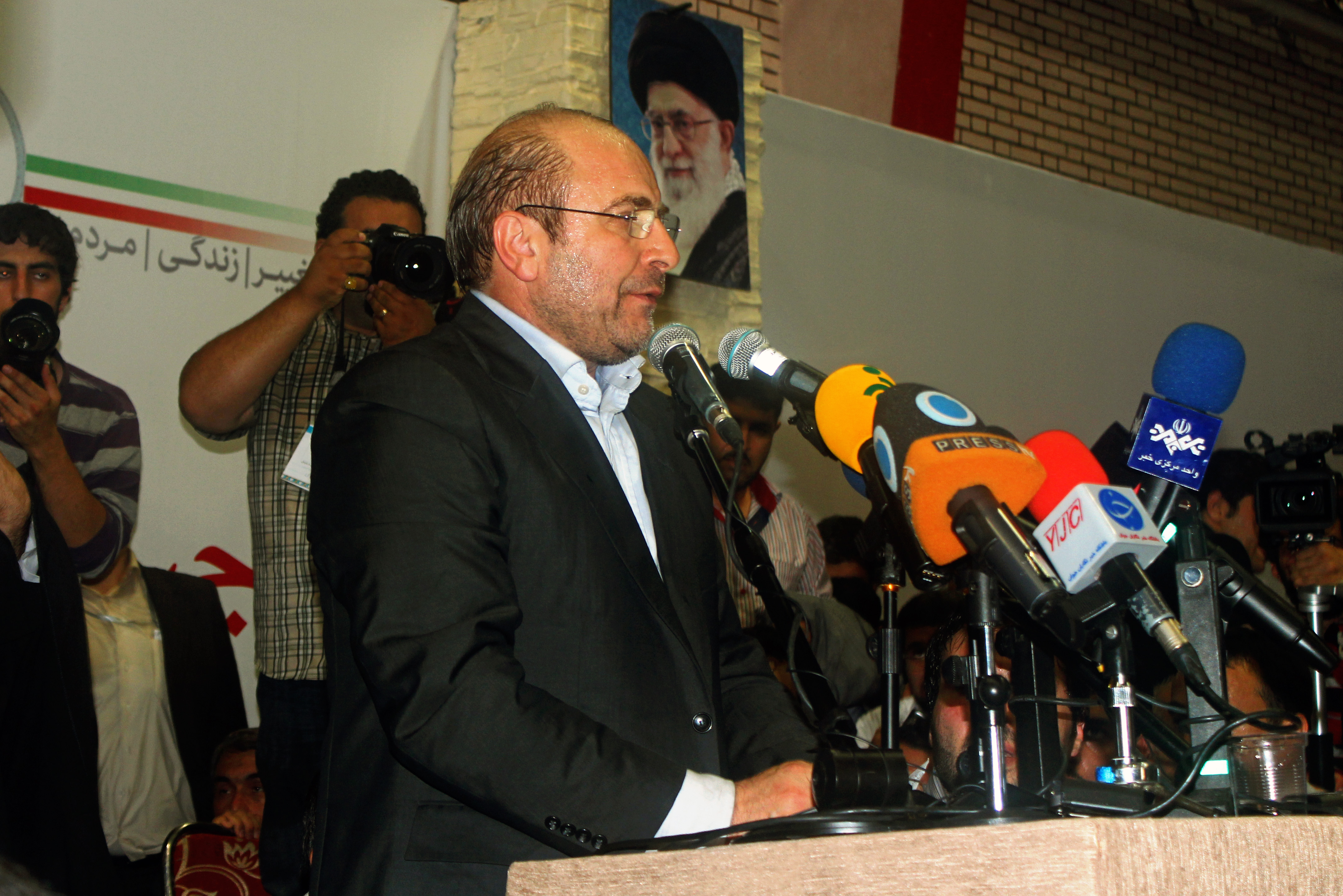
Ghalibaf speech in a 2013 campaign in Mashhad

He set Love and Sacrifice and Jihadi Change as his official slogans. His candidacy was approved by the Guardian Council on 21 May 2013 along with seven other candidates. He was one of the opponents of Akbar Hashemi Rafsanjani's candidacy and said it was better that Rafsanjani not enter the race, as he had served two terms before. He and two other candidates, Ali Akbar Velayati and Gholam-Ali Haddad-Adel, formed a coalition called "2+1". He was endorsed by former candidates, Alireza Ali-Ahmadi and Sadegh Vaez-Zadeh. Ali Larijani, the former chairman of parliament later assassinated in the 2026 Iran War, also supported Ghalibaf in the election.

According to the Guardian in 2013, his moderating streak as Tehran's mayor was evident throughout Ghalibaf's political efforts. Ghalibaf received 6,077,292 votes (16.55%), putting him in second place behind winner Hassan Rouhani, who was elected as the new president. Hours after the announcement of the results, Ghalibaf published a statement congratulating Rouhani on his election as President of Iran and conceding.

=== 2017 presidential election ===
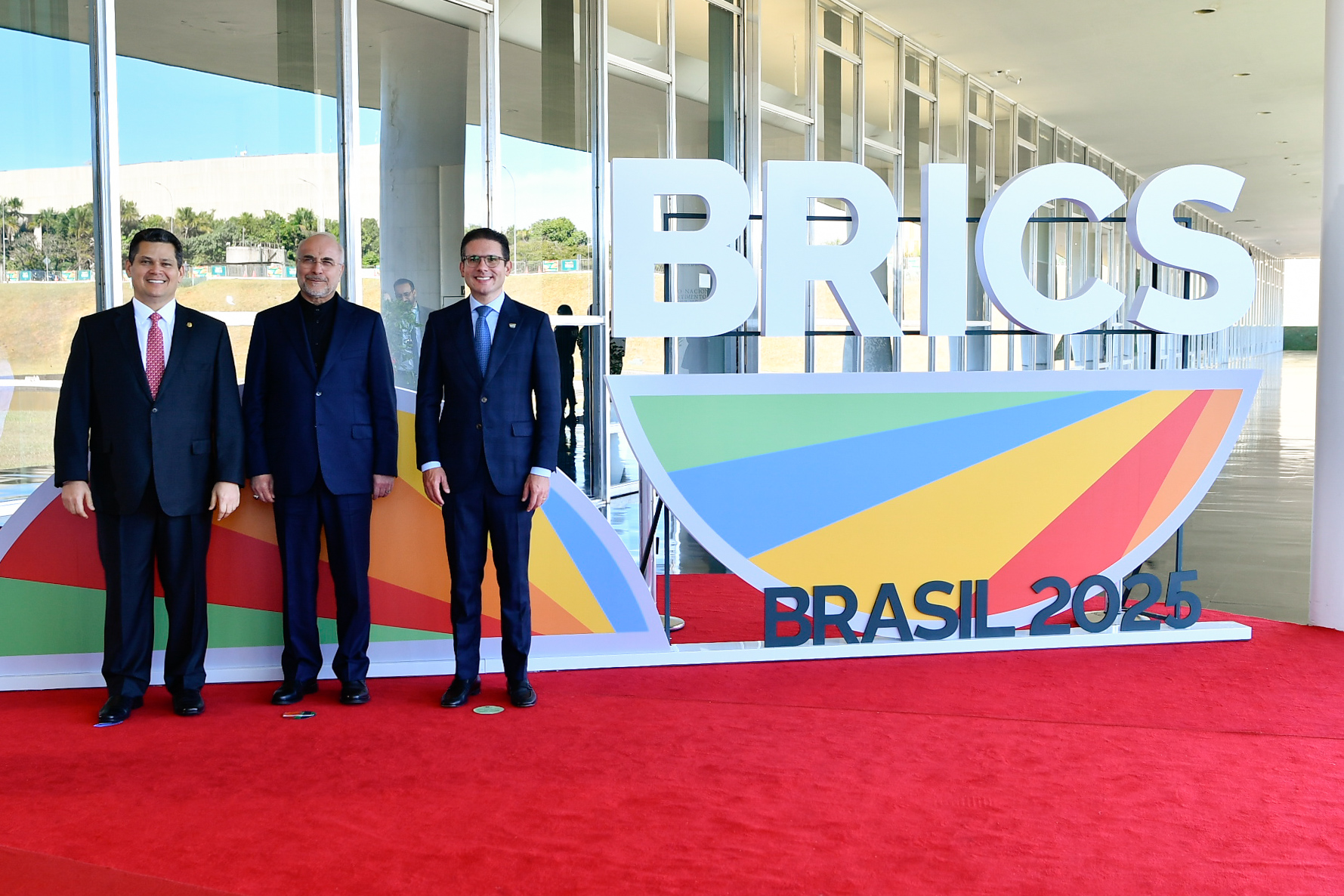
Ghalibaf at the 11th BRICS Parliamentary Forum in Brazil on 4 June 2025

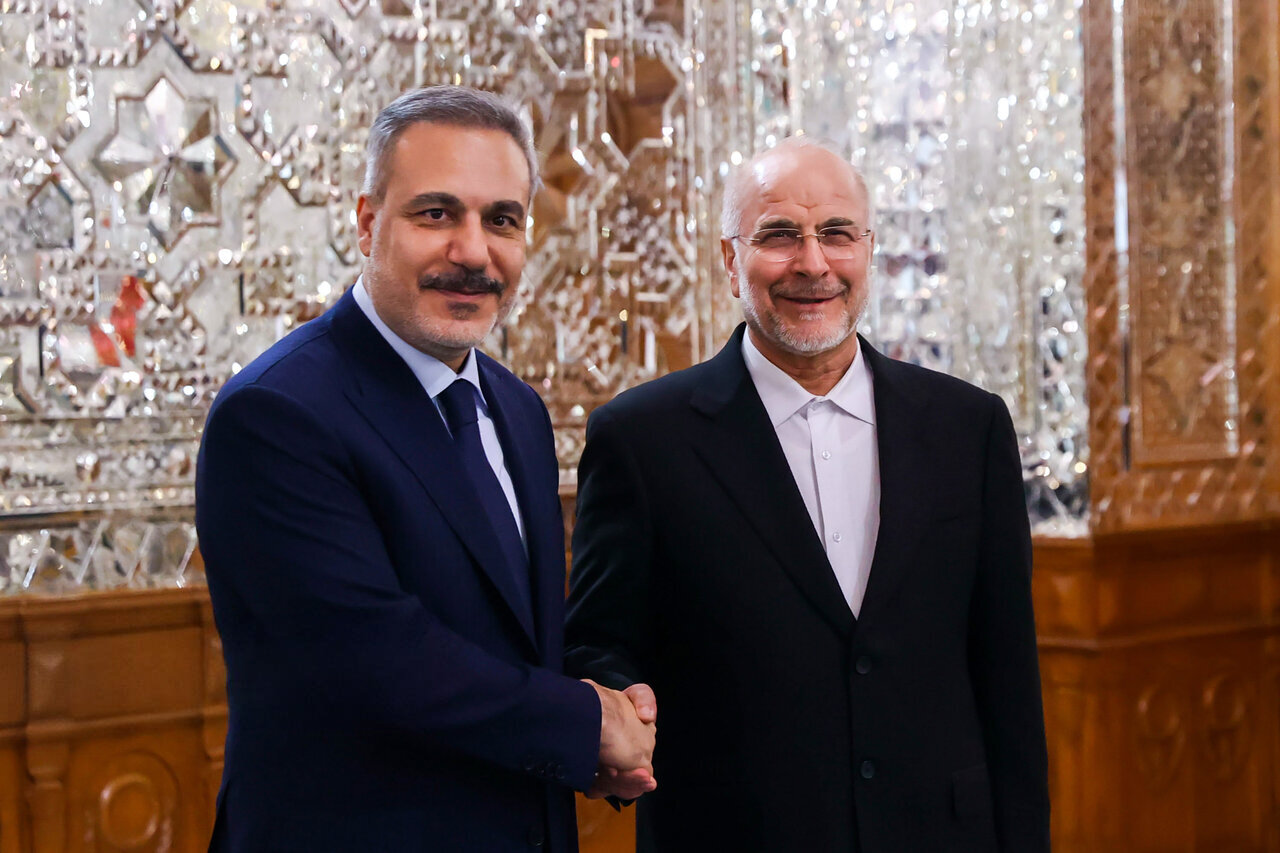
Turkish Foreign Minister Hakan Fidan and Ghalibaf in Tehran on 30 November 2025

Ghalibaf began his third presidential campaign for the Iranian presidency on 15 April 2017. On 15 May 2017, Ghalibaf withdrew.

=== 2024 presidential election ===
Ghalibaf's candidacy for the 2024 Iranian presidential election was approved by the guardian council in June 2024.

Senior IRGC commanders, including Major General Mohsen Rezaee, Rear Admiral Ali Shamkhani (later killed during the 2026 Iran War), and Brigadier General Hossein Dehghan supported Ghalibaf's presidential bid.

== Public image ==
According to the University of Maryland's School of Public Policy report Iranian Public Opinion Soon After the Twelve-Day War released in December 2025, Ghalibaf was viewed "favorably" by 56% (including 13% "very favorably") of the population, up from 55% in the previous year.

== Personal life ==
Ghalibaf married Zahra Sadat Moshir (born 1968) in 1982, his neighbor, when he was 21 years old. When her husband became mayor, Moshir became an adviser and head of women's affairs in the Municipality of Tehran. They have three children, namely Elias, Eshaq and Maryam.

Ghalibaf is also a professor at the University of Tehran, having been teaching political geography since 2003. He is a pilot, certified to fly certain Airbus aircraft.

=== Soleimani friendship ===
Ghalibaf, who commanded the 5th Nasr Division and then the 25th Karbala Special Division of the IRGC in the Iran–Iraq War, developed a long friendship with the then up-and-coming commander of the 41st Tharallah Division, General Qasem Soleimani. In the words of Arash Azizi:

During the war years, the commanders who had distinguished themselves most, had a regional base and a talent for organizing the men of their provinces for the national war effort. Three such men became close comrades and helped build a web of influence that strengthened their respective positions: Mohammad Baqer Qalibaf, Ahmad Kazemi, and Qassem Soleimani. When the war ended, they were respectively 27, 29, and 32 years old. They had respectively led IRGC divisions in Khorasan, Isfahan province, and Kerman province provinces, three of the biggest territorial units in the country which together accounted for much of the country's population.

In the 2013 Iranian presidential election Soleimani reportedly voted for Ghalibaf, who represented IRGC veterans' interests, against moderate candidate Hassan Rouhani, who eventually won.

== Electoral history ==
Year	Election	Votes	%	Rank	Notes
2005	President	4,095,827	13.93	4th	Lost
2013	President	▲6,077,292	▲16.56	2nd	Lost
2017	President	–			Withdrew
2020	Parliament	1,265,287	68.69	1st	Won
2024	Parliament	▼447,905	▼28.53	4th	Won
2024	President	▼3,383,340	▼13.79	3rd	Lost

== Books ==
Ghalibaf has authored books primarily focusing on geopolitics, political geography, and urban governance, including:

- The Logic of Complexity Analysis in Geopolitics: The Governance of Regimes in Geographical Structures (2023, with Majid Gholami).
- A Review of the Concepts of Human Geography (2020, with Mohammad Hadi Pouyandeh).
- Centralization and Decentralization in Iran (2017).
- Iran and the Development-Oriented (2009).
- Local Government (2007).

== Accolades ==
- World Mayor: 8th place (2008)
- Sustainable Transport Award: 2nd place (2011)

== See also ==
- List of Iranian officials

Military offices
Preceded by Mohammad Hossein Jalali	Commander of the Revolutionary Guards Air Force; 30 October 1997–28 June 2000	Succeeded by Ahmad Kazemi
Preceded by Mohammad Vafayi	Commander of the Khatam al-Anbiya Construction Headquarters; 1994–1997	Succeeded by Hassan Danaeifar
Preceded by Morteza Ghorbani	Commander of the 25th Karbala Division; 1988–1994	Succeeded by Unknown
Preceded by Morteza Ghorbani	Commander of the 5th Nasr Division; 1983–1987	Succeeded by Esmail Qaani
Preceded by Mohammad-Mahdi Khadem al-Sharia	Commander of the 21st Imam Reza Armored Brigade; 1982–1984	Succeeded by Esmail Qaani
Police appointments
Preceded by Hedayat Lotfian	Commander of the Law Enforcement Force; 27 June 2000–4 April 2005	Succeeded by Ali Abdollahi; Acting
Political offices
Preceded by Abdolvahed Mousavi Lari as Minister of Interior	Commissioner of the President of Iran; Head of the Headquarters for Fighting the Smuggling of Goods and Currency; 2004–2005	Succeeded by Mohammad Reza Naqdi
Preceded by Ali Saeedlou; Acting	Mayor of Tehran; 14 September 2005–23 August 2017	Succeeded by Mostafa Salimi; Acting
Assembly seats
Preceded by Ali Larijani	Speaker of Parliament of Iran; 2020–present	Incumbent
