= 25th Karbala Division =

- لشکر 25 کربلا
- Active: 1980s–present
- Country: Islamic Republic of Iran
- Branch: Islamic Revolutionary Guard Corps
- Type: Infantry; Special forces
- Size: Division
- Garrison/HQ: Sari, Mazandaran province
- Nickname: "Karbala" (کربلا)
- Engagements: Iran–Iraq War; First Battle of al-Faw; Syrian Civil War; Iranian intervention in the Syrian Civil War

Commanders
- Commander in Chief: Governor-General Mahmoud Hosseinipour
- Notable commanders: Morteza Ghorbani

25th Karbala Division (Persian: لشکر 25 کربلا) was a division of the Islamic Revolutionary Guard Corps. It was first officially formed as the 2nd Karbala Brigade (تیپ 2 کربلا) during the Iran–Iraq War, and was later expanded into a division, briefly becoming the 25th Karbala Special Division to conduct the amphibuous operation on taking the Al-Faw Peninsula.

== History ==
After Operation Samen al-A’immeh in 1981, Revolutionary Guard commanders assigned Morteza Ghorbani to lead Operation Tariq al-Quds. To carry it out, the 25th Karbala Brigade and several other brigades were formed within the Guards’ Combat Organization. At first, most members of the 25th Karbala Brigade came from Isfahan Province, though troops from other regions also joined. During Operation Tariq al-Quds, there were few soldiers from Mazandaran, Gilan, and Golestan, but by Operation Fath al-Mubin (1982), many fighters from these northern provinces had joined, including some Mazandaran commanders who served as battalion leaders. After Fath al-Mubin, the brigade prepared for the Beit ol-Moqaddas Operation later that year, with most of its forces coming from the north. The northern provinces sent about ten infantry battalions, mainly to the 37th Noor, 22nd Beit ol-Moqaddas, and 25th Karbala Brigades. Following this, commanders officially assigned the 25th Karbala Brigade’s recruitment and support to the northern provinces. By the Ramadan Operation (1982), most of the brigade’s personnel came from Mazandaran, Gilan, and Golestan.

From the Beit ol-Moqaddas Operation until the end of the Muharram Operation, Morteza Ghorbani remained in command. Later, the brigade was upgraded to the 25th Karbala Division, with Abdul Ali Omrani appointed as its first commander. Omrani was injured by a mine explosion during a reconnaissance mission before Operation Valfajr in 1983, after which Ali Akbar Yilaghi Ashrafi briefly took command. He too was wounded later that year, and Komeil Kohansal temporarily replaced him. When Omrani recovered, he resumed leadership. Before Operation Valfajr 4 (1983), Mohammad Hassan Koosechi became commander and led the division until after the Badr Operation. In June 1984, before Operation Quds 1, Morteza Ghorbani returned to Mazandaran and reassumed command of the 25th Karbala Division, leading it until the end of the Iran–Iraq War.

== Forming new brigates ==
According to Mohsen Rezaee, after a series of unsuccessful Iranian offensive operations in late stages of the Iran–Iraq War, it was decided to form several new brigades in the IRGC, and one new "special" division. The Karbala Division was later selected to be the special division. A team consisted of Hossein Basir, Mohammad Hassan Tusi, and other commanders were tasked to organize this division, and Morteza Ghorbani was appointed as its commander. Since then, the division was called 25th Karbala Special Division (لشکر 25 ویژه کربلا). The division was employed in the First Battle of al-Faw, which was successful in capturing the strategic Al-Faw Peninsula. According to Iranian sources, Iraqi General Maher Abd al-Rashid had described the unit as a "black scorpion" that should be destroyed, possibly a reference to their black frogman suits during the battle.

== Ghadir Headquarters ==
This division is under the Ghadir Headquarters, whose headquarters are located in the city of Sari, Mazandaran Province. Its first commander was Morteza Ghorbani and its forces were from Mazandaran Province. Currently, Brigadier General Abdullah Salehi of the Revolutionary Guards is in charge of the command of the 25th Karbala Division.

== Sepah-e Karbala ==
The division was merged with a Basij unit in the Mazandaran Province to form the Mazandaran Karbala Provincial Corps during the rearrangement of the IRGC units in 2008.

== Operations ==
This unit participated in 22 operations as an operating unit during the war.

== Battle of Aleppo ==
On May 5, 2016, about 200 members of the 25th Karbala Division from Mazandaran took part in heavy fighting in Khan Touman, defending the city of Aleppo against roughly 2,000 Syrian opposition fighters. The battle resulted in the deaths of 13 members of the 25th Karbala Division.
