= Insurgency in Sistan and Balochistan =

Separatist insurgency in Iran

- Part of the larger insurgency in Balochistan
- Map of Iran with Sistan and Balochistan province highlighted
Date	2004 – present (22 years)
Location	Sistan and Balochistan province, Iran
Status	Ongoing: December 2025, Jaysh al-Adl and other Iranian Balochi separatist groups merge into a newly formed People's Fighters Front, launching an attack on the Iranian Revolutionary Guards Corps; January 2026, PFF voices support for the 2025–2026 Iranian protests and targets Iranian police forces; PFF vows more attacks against Iran amid the 2026 Iran war; Sistan and Balochistan clashes (2026–present)

Belligerents
Iran	Baloch separatists Baloch Islamists

Commanders and leaders
Mojtaba Khamenei (2026–present); Ali Khamenei (2004–2026); Ali Shamkhani (2004–2005); Mostafa Mohammad-Najjar (2005–2013); Ahmad Vahidi (2013–present); Hossein Dehghan (2013–2017); Amir Hatami (2017–2021); Mohammad-Reza Gharaei Ashtiani (2021–2024); Aziz Nasirzadeh (2024-2026); Abdolvahed Mousavi Lari (2004–2005); Mostafa Pourmohammadi (2005–2008); Seyyed Mehdi Hashemi (2008); Ali Kordan (2008); Kamran Daneshjoo (2008); Sadegh Mahsouli (2008–2009); Hassan Firouzabadi (2004–2016); Abdolreza Rahmani Fazli (2013–2021); Hassan Firouzabadi (2004–2016); Mohammad Salimi (2004–2005); Ataollah Salehi (2005–2017); Abdolrahim Mousavi (2017–2026); Nasser Mohammadifar (2004–2005); Mohammad-Hossein Dadras (2005–2008); Ahmad Reza Pourdastan (2008–2016); Kioumars Heydari (2016–2025); Ali Jahanshahi (2025-present); Yahya Rahim Safavi (2004–2007); Ali Jafari (2004–2019); Ahmad Kazemi (2005–2006); Mohammad Reza Zahedi (2006–2008); Mohammad Jafar Asadi (2008–20); Mohammad Pakpour (2009–2026); Mohammad Karami (2025-present); Nur-Ali Shushtari (2004–2009) †; Esmail Ahmadi-Moghaddam (2004–2016); Hossein Ashtari (2016–2023); Ahmad-Reza Radan (2023–present)	Abdolmalek Rigi (2004–2009) (executed); Abdolhamid Rigi (2009–2010) (executed); Muhammad Zahir Baloch (2010–present); Salahuddin Farooqui (2011–2024) †; Mohammad Shafi (2012–2013) †; Abu Hafs al Baloochi (2013–2015) †; Jalil Qanbarzehi (2015–2017) †; Mahmood Baloch; Mullah Akram Naroi †; Abdul Rauf Rigi X

Units involved
Iranian Armed Forces; Artesh (since 1979); Ground Forces; Air Force; Navy; Special forces; NOHED Brigade; 3rd Marine Brigade; IRGC (since 1980); Ground Forces; Aerospace Force; Navy; Basij; Special forces; Saberin Unit; 110th Brigade; Sepah Navy Special Force; Iranian police; Border Guard (since 2000); Ministry of Intelligence; Imperial Iranian Army (until 1979)	Current: People's Fighters Front (2025–present); Jaish ul-Adl (2013–present); Nasr Movement (2010–present); Pada Baloch Movement (2017–present); Mohammad Rasul Allah Group (1970s–present); Ansar Al-Furqan (2013–present); Former: Jundallah (2004–2011); Harakat Ansar (2012–2013); Lashkar-e-Jhangvi (1996–2024)

Strength
Unknown	Jaish ul-Adl: 500–600; Jundallah: 500–2,000 (until 2011)

Casualties and losses
164 killed (security forces and civilians)	Unknown

The insurgency in Sistan and Balochistan is an ongoing low-intensity asymmetric conflict in the Sistan and Balochistan province of Iran, undertaken by several Sunni Baloch militant organizations. These groups have been designated as terrorist organizations by the Iranian government. It began in 2004 and is part of the wider insurgency in the Balochistan region.

== Background ==
=== Motivations of the insurgent groups ===
Analysts believe that the aim of insurgents may differ from separatism to religious motivations, but they are not entirely clear. The leaders of the groups have maintained different positions: from Baloch nationalism to Salafi jihadism.

=== Belligerents ===
==== Iran ====
- Islamic Republic of Iran Army and Islamic Revolutionary Guard Corps, responsible for both military and security actions as part of the Iranian Armed Forces along with the Iranian police.
- Ministry of Intelligence, doing intelligence operations.
- Border Guard Command, engaging border conflicts with insurgent groups.

==== Baloch rebels ====
- Jundallah: founded in 2002, was active since 2005, carrying out armed assaults against Iranian armed forces as well as civilians. Since arrest and execution of its leader Abdolmalek Rigi in 2010, they were responsible for a few bombings in 2011 under command of Muhammad Zahir Baloch.
- Jaysh al-Adl: founded in 2012 by former Jundallah members, there is very little known about the group. The group was founded and led by Salahuddin Farooqui who has opposed Iranian support for Syria in the Syrian Civil War. They have claimed responsibility for dozens of operations since 2013. Jaish-ul-Adl's founder and leader, Salahuddin Farooqui, was killed in a joint-operation by Iran and Pakistan against it in late 2024. Jaysh al-Adl merged into the People's Fighters Front (PFF) in 2025.
- Ansar Al-Furqan: founded by December 2013 merger of Harakat Ansar and Pashtun group Hizb Al-Furqan. They are linked to Al-Nusra Front and are led by Sheikh Abu-Hafs al-Baloochi.
- Baloch Liberation Army: founded in 2000, was active since 2005, carrying out armed assaults against Pakistani armed forces, Paramilitary Frontier Corpsmen, as well as civilians from Iranian and as well as Afghan soil. It was banned by the Iranian government in 2024. Iran and Pakistan have conducted crackdowns and military operations against it.
- Baloch Liberation Front: founded originally in 1964 in Damascus by Jumma Khan Marri, it re-emerged in 2004 after Allah Nazar Baloch took command of the group in 2003. It fought against both Iran and Pakistan in the 1963–1969 insurgency and the 1973 –1977 insurgency. It has conducted attacks on Pakistani Security Forces such as the Army, the paramilitary Frontier Corps and on civilians, from its camps is Iran and Afghanistan. It was banned by the Iranian government in 2024. Crackdowns have occurred against the group in both countries.
- People's Fighters Front (PFF): founded in 2025 as a merger of Jaysh al-Adl, Pada Baloch Movement, Nasr Movement and other militias. They stated to overthrow the "Velayat-e-Faqih regime," which refers to the Islamic Republic of Iran government.

== History ==
In December 2005, a bomb exploded near a car carrying then president Mahmoud Ahmadinejad during an ambush in the province, resulting in the death of one of his bodyguards and another individual.

On 14 February 2007, a car bomb detonated in front of a bus transporting members of Iran's revolutionary guard corps in Zehedan reportedly resulting in the death of 11 and injury of 34 others.

On 29 January 2019, a double-bombing lightly wounded three police officers in Zahedan, the capital of Sistan and Balochistan province. Jaysh al-Adl claimed responsibility.

On 2 February, an IRGC soldier was killed and five others wounded in an insurgent attack on a Basij base in Nik Shahr city. Jaysh al-Adl claimed responsibility for the attack. According to Arab news, the attack was carried out by two people who climbed the walls of the Basij paramilitary base and started shooting. On 13 February, a suicide car bomb attack targeting a bus carrying IRGC personnel on the Khash-Zahedan road killed at least 27 soldiers and wounded 13 more. Jaysh al-Adl claimed responsibility for the attack. According to Haaretz, the head of IRGC Maj. Mohammad Ali Jafari stated, without providing proof, that Israel gave the Emirates and Saudi Arabia the go ahead to conduct the attack. On 21 March, Pakistan announced that it had rescued four Iranian soldiers kidnapped by the Jaysh al-Adl group last year. It did not announce any other details. Jaysh al-Adl had kidnapped 12 Iranian soldiers in October and later released five. Following the announcement, there were still three Iranian soldiers held by the group. On 20 July, two members of the IRGC were killed and another two wounded late at night during a confrontation with gunmen near the border with Pakistan. The confrontation occurred in Keshtegan area of Saravan County, province of Sistan and Balochistan.

On 30 June 2020, Jaysh al-Adl claimed responsibility for a roadside IED blast that injured an IRGC commander on a road in Sistan and Balochistan Province. On 5 August, four police officers were injured when a sound bomb exploded next to their vehicle in Zahedan, capital of Sistan and Balochistan Province, Iran. On 29 September, three Basij members were killed and another was wounded in a drive-by shooting in Nik Shahr county, Sistan-Balochistan province.

On 1 January 2022, the IRGC said in a statement that during clashes with a group of "armed terrorists" in the Kurin region of Sistan and Balochistan province, three Basij members were killed in addition to six "terrorists". On 23 April, the Quds Regional Headquarters of the IRGC announced that a bodyguard was killed after terrorists opened fire at the car of Brigadier General Hosein Almasi was the commander of the 110th Salman Farsi Special Operations Brigade following an ambush at a military checkpoint near Zahedan.

In January 2023, one IRGC soldier was killed in one attack. Two more were killed during another attack on a police office. In March, one ranking intelligence agent killed in hostage taking and patrol attacked undisclosed kills and one Saravan border soldier killed. Government was warned of trouble if water is not supplied. In April, the Saravan Police Chief was killed in an armed attack. His wife was also seriously injured in this attack. In June, five soldiers were killed at the border with Pakistan. In July, Four police killed on ambush. Four attackers and two police officers killed during an attack on a police station.

In January 2024, Iran's security forces attacked the militants' hideout, killing 9 suspected fighters, including Mullah Akram Naroi who had reportedly been involved in an earlier attack on Rask police station. During the 2024 Iran–Pakistan conflict Iran carried out a missile and drone strike against militant groups in Pakistan. Pakistan retaliated with air and drone strikes against militants in Iranian territory.

On 3 April, Militants allegedly belonging to Jaysh al-Adl attacked the Islamic Revolutionary Guard Corps headquarters in Rask and Chabahar counties, part of southern Sistan province. The militants killed 11 security personnel. On 6 November, On November 6, twelve Jaysh al-Adl militants were killed, including the group's leader Salahuddin Farooqui, in a joint operation by Iran and Pakistan. By November 24, the Iranian military reported 76 suspected militants killed.

In December 2025, the People's Fighters Front (PFF) claimed responsibility for an attack on Iranian Revolutionary Guards Corps (IRGC) personnel, killing at least 3 people near Zahedan. In January 2026, during the Iranian protests, a PFF militant killed Mahmoud Haqiqat, the police chief of Iranshahr. During the 2026 Iran war, The PFF's Council of Scholars held Iran responsible for the war and vowed more conflicts against it. Later, Iranian security and military forces repeatedly clashed with PFF fighters in June and September 2026, resulting in casualties on both sides.

== Foreign involvement ==
=== Role of Pakistan ===
Pakistan is Iran's neighbour, sharing the borders of its Balochistan with Sistan and Balochistan. Pakistan's Balochistan province is also suffering from low-level insurgency waged by terrorist and separatist militants against the government of Pakistan. These Pakistani Baloch terrorist and separatist militant groups are allied with Iranian Baloch groups. Iran and Pakistan historically have a strategic alliance fighting these groups. In February 2014 the two states signed a pact sharing responsibility for combating militants operating across the border. According to a former U.S. intelligence officer, Jundallah leader Abdolmalek Rigi was captured by Pakistani officials and delivered to Iran with U.S. support: "It doesn't matter what they say. They know the truth."

=== Allegations of foreign involvement ===
Iran has long accused foreign states supporting insurgency in Sistan and Balochistan. Several sources such as the ABC News, The New York Times, Daily Telegraph and Seymour Hersh have reported that Jundallah has received support from the United States. Israel, Saudi Arabia, United Kingdom and Sweden are other states allegedly sponsoring the group.

Claims of Central Intelligence Agency (CIA) support were debunked by a subsequent investigation showing that the CIA "had barred even the most incidental contact with Jundallah." The rumors originated in an Israeli Mossad "false flag" operation; Mossad agents posing as CIA officers met with and recruited members of Jundullah in cities such as London to carry out attacks against Iran. President George W. Bush "went absolutely ballistic" when he learned of Israel's actions, but the situation was not resolved until President Barack Obama's administration "drastically scaled back joint U.S.-Israel intelligence programs targeting Iran" and ultimately designated Jundallah a terrorist organization in November 2010. Although the CIA cut all ties with Jundallah after the 2007 Zahedan bombings, the Federal Bureau of Investigation (FBI) and United States Department of Defense continued to gather intelligence on Jundallah through assets cultivated by "FBI counterterrorism task force officer" Thomas McHale; the CIA co-authorized a 2008 trip McHale made to meet his informants in Afghanistan. According to The New York Times: "Current and former officials say the American government never directed or approved any Jundallah operations. And they say there was never a case when the United States was told the timing and target of a terrorist attack yet took no action to prevent it." Mashregh News, which has close ties to the IRGC, has accused Qatar of supporting both Jaish ul-Adl and Harakat Ansar Iran, alongside Saudi Arabia. Harakat Ansar Iran has made an appeal on Saudi Arabian websites for funding.
