= Attack on Tasooki =

Terrorist attack in Iran

Attack of Tasooki
- Location: Zabol-Zahedan road, Iran
- Date: March 16, 2006; 9:00 p.m.
- Attack type: Shooting, mass murder, Hostage
- Deaths: 22
- Injuries: 6
- Perpetrator: Jundallah (Iran)

The attack of Tasooki was a terrorist attack against Iran. It took place at 21:00 on 25 Esfand 1384 (March 16, 2006) in Zabol-Zahedan road near the police station. The perpetrators were members of the Baloch religio-political insurgency named Jundallah (Iran). The attack left 22 dead and 7 captured. in that night the forces of jundallah and Abdolmalek rigi attacked several passing vehicles, mostly buses, in the guise of police and killed 21 Shia male passengers in front of their wives and children.

After tying the hands and feet of women and children and leaving them in the street, the Rigi forces took a number of ordinary people and military forces as hostages.

== Jundallah (Iran) ==
Jundallah (Iran) was a group of "Baloch religio-political insurgency" active in Iran from 2004 to 2010. By executing the leader, Abdolmalek Rigi, Jundallah was destroyed. They believed that they could administer justice for the people of Balochestan by using violence. From 2006 to 2014, Jundallah organized 25 assaults in Balochestan.

== Event ==
Tasooki's police station is located near the Iran/Afghanistan border. Due to the presence of terrorist groups and smugglers, policed inspected border crossers. On 16 March 2006, Abdolmalek Rigi led a group of his followers wearing police uniforms. They closed the road and stopped cars en route. They divided passengers into Baloch, Shia and Sunni and others. They then executed the Shia travelers (except of children and women).

22 citizens (including a student, a worker, an employee, a soldier, a reporter and a businessman) were killed. Six were injured and seven taken hostage. The hostages were released after 200 days.

During the attack, government officials were killed and Hasan ali Nouri, the Governor of Zahedan was injured.

Abdolmalek Rigi said that the reason for the attack was that they would have nothing to do with Sunni or Shia until Baloch people were no longer threatened by Iran's government. However six more Baloch from Nootizahi and Shahbakhsh tribe were killed by Iranian security forces. The attack on Tasooki was revenge for those deaths.

== Reaction ==
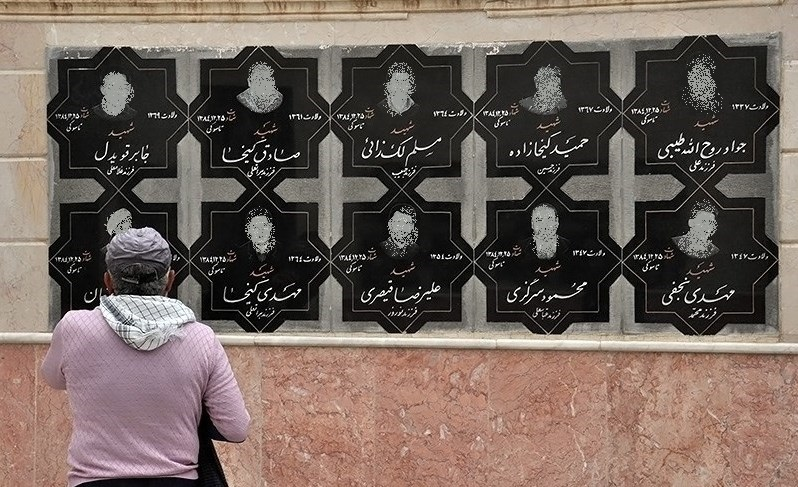
Citizens who were killed during the attack of Tasooki

Iranian government officials labeled the attackers as "rebels" with political motivations. The group requested the Iranian government to release members of Jundallah from prison. Iranian officials claimed that the United Kingdom and United States had supported Jundallah groups. The UK denied the accusation. Following the attack student Reza Lakzaei was held hostage for five months. He described the attack the book Tasooki, Memories of a Hostage.

== See also ==
- 2007 Zahedan bombings
- Baluchi Autonomist Movement
- Persecution of Shia Muslims
- Religious terrorism
- Sistan and Baluchistan Province
- Arrest of Abdolmalek Rigi
