= 2010 Zahedan bombings =

Suicide bombing in Iran

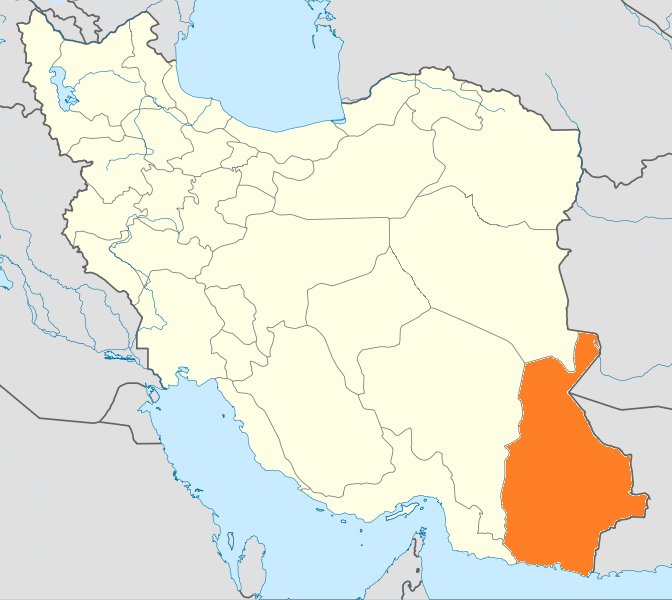
- Sistan and Baluchistan Province highlighted within Iran
- Location: 29°28′59″N 60°51′53″E; Zahedan, Sistan-Baluchestan, Iran
- Date: 15 July 2010 (UTC+4½)
- Target: Shia worshippers
- Attack type: Suicide bombings
- Deaths: 27+
- Injuries: 270+
- Perpetrator: Jundullah

The 2010 Zahedan bombings were two suicide bombings on 15 July 2010 that targeted Shia worshippers in Iran, including members of the Revolutionary Guards. The bombings targeted those celebrating the birthday of a Muslim saint at the Jamia mosque in Zahedan, Sistan-Baluchestan. Responsibility for the attacks was claimed by Jundullah in revenge for the execution of their leader by the Iranian government. Amongst the reactions and national and supranational condemnations, Iran blamed the United States and Israel for facilitating the attack.

== Background ==
In the months before the attack, Iran captured and executed the leader of Jundullah Abdolmalek Rigi and his brother Abdolhamid Rigi. In retaliation, Jundullah vowed revenge for his execution.

This attack was also similar to another attack in the same city the previous year, which also targeted a mosque and killed several high-ranking Revolutionary Guards. The group have carried out many more attacks against the Guards in the province.

== Attacks ==
The attacks occurred as worshippers were celebrating the birthday of Imam Hussein, the grandson of the Prophet Mohammed.

Iran's deputy interior minister said "a suicide operation was carried out in the Jamia mosque, which left several martyrs [victims killed] and several wounded. The first explosion took place behind a checkpoint and a number of Revolutionary Guard members were killed and injured because of it." Hossein Ali Shahriari, a Zahedan member of parliament, said that two suicide attacks occurred one after another, with the first one carried out by a bomber dressed as a woman. "The attacker, dressed in women's clothing, was trying to get in the mosque, but was prevented. When people came to rescue those hit in that blast, another bomber blew himself up. Three to four have been killed at least in the first attack."

In addition to the 27 killed, eleven people were in critical condition. The Minister of Health, Marzieh Vahid Dastjerdi, said a specialized medical team has been dispatched to the city to rush aid to the victims.

== Investigations ==
Two days after the attack, Iranian police arrested 40 people for "creating disturbances". Deputy police chief, General Ahmad Reza Radan, said the police had arrested people who "intended to create insecurity in the city of Zahedan after the bombing."

== Responsibility ==
In an email to Al-Arabiya, Jundallah said the attacks were a response to the execution of its leaders and also threatened more such attacks.

== Reactions ==
Domestic reactions

- Iran declared three days of mourning. Supreme leader Ayatollah Ali Khamenei sent a condolence message to the people of the province and also said

"In our region... the blind and savage terrorism is born out of the evil policies of the United States, Britain and their state and non-state mercenaries. All Muslims are required to combat and confront this evil and sinister offspring which is the epitome of corruption on earth and of waging war against God. [This] bloody incident [was carried out by] devious, bigoted Wahabis with the support and plotting of foreign spy organizations. The Shiite and Sunni thinkers in all Islamic and Arab countries should define the wicked intentions of the enemies which is to instigate sectarian terrorism for all and prevent them (Muslim nations) from the great danger of religious unrest. [Iran was the] target of the spy services of the US and Zionist regimes, and Britain [who wanted to] push it into religious unrest and into a Shiite-Sunni conflict. But the Islamic republic will not allow the agents of global arrogance to incite division among Muslim brothers."

President Mahmoud Ahmadinejad upped the ante a few days later saying "No grouping other than US-backed terrorist groups which are devoid of human feelings can commit such acts." Adding that though "We are friends with the Pakistani nation, ... but the Pakistani government should be held accountable. The puppeteers pulling the strings in this show will get nothing. Such aggressive policies will only fuel public hatred." He also called on the Foreign Ministry to follow up on the attack with the Pakistani government; and instructed his office to lodge a complaint within "international circles" based on "existing documents" and NATO and Israel's cooperation with the terrorists. Ali Mohammad Azad, the governor of Sistan-Baluchestan province, blamed "the intelligence services of arrogant powers" (often a euphemism for the West). The Interior Minister, Mostafa Mohammad Najjar, said "The terrorist act by the Zionists had a number of objectives, including creating division between Shias and Sunnis." The deputy interior minister, Ali Abdollahi, said "This blind terrorist act was carried out by the mercenaries of the world['s] arrogance (the Western powers). The agents of this crime were trained and equipped beyond our borders and then came into Iran." The deputy commander of the Revolutionary Guards, General Hossein Salami, said the victims "were martyred by the hands of mercenaries of the US and UK." Yadollah Javani, the head of IRGC's political bureau, said the attack points to the involvement of terrorist groups under the auspices of the United States, Israel and some other Western countries seeking to create sectarian division. Massoud Jazayeri, the deputy head and a senior IRGC commander said "Jundollah has been supported by America for its terrorist acts in the past ... America will have to await the fallout of such criminal and savage measures." Foreign Ministry Spokesman Ramin Mehmanparast also took issue with the West saying "Western countries had better stop supporting terrorists instead of giving them shelter on their soil and strengthening them."

An Iranian Sunni cleric, Molavi Nazir Ahmad Salami, condemned the attack and urged vigilance against creating a rift between Shias and Sunnis. He said

The terrorist bombings were carried out in front of Zahedan's Grand Mosque with the aim of undermining Shia-Sunni unity and solidarity among the brave border-guarding people of the region and thus people should be on alert. This bestial crime left yet another stain of disgrace on the dark record of the global arrogance.

Hossein-Ali Shahriari, the Zahedan representative to the Majlis, tendered his resignation telling the Speaker Ali Larijani that he was resigning due to the inability of authorities to maintain security in his constituency. Two more representatives from the province, Abbas-Ali Noura and Peyman Forouzesh also resign for the same reason.

On 17 July, tens of thousands of mourners amassed in Zahedan for the burial of the dead.

International organizations

- European Union condemned the attack.
- United Nations Secretary General Ban Ki-moon said "This senseless act of terrorism at a place of worship makes it all the more reprehensible." While the Security Council condemned the attack in the "strongest terms" and called for those responsible to be brought to justice. "The members of the Security Council express their condolences to the families of the victims, as well as to the people and the Government of Iran."

Other states

- (Afghanistan) Afghan President Hamid Karzai issued a statement expressing deep grief and "this awful terrorist crime an attack against God's house and emphasized the effective struggle and regional fight against terrorism."
- Canadian Foreign Affairs Minister Lawrence Cannon issued a statement condemning "the deadly suicide bombings that claimed the lives of more than 25 people at the Jamia mosque." The minister expressed condolences, on behalf of all Canadians, to the families of those killed. He concluded by stating Canada's hope that "the perpetrators of these violent acts will be brought to justice".
- Jordan King Abdullah II of Jordan condemned the bombings.
- (Lebanon) Lebanese opposition party leader Hassan Nasrallah of Hezbollah said "We extend the deepest condolences to the Leader of the Islamic Revolution and to the government and people of the Islamic Republic as well as to the relatives of the victims." An Hezbollah statement also said they considered the attack a crime "as part of the arrogant campaign against the Islamic Republic of Iran, through terrorist groups and organizations that have been raised by western intelligence, as the latter taught them combat techniques that know no mercy, indiscriminate of age or gender." It added that the group were confident that Iran would overcome such "criminal aggressions, as it should bring the murderous terrorist organizations to an end on one hand, and severs any American-Western attempt to use these criminals in realizing its arrogant targets inside the Islamic Republic."
- United Kingdom Foreign Office Minister Alistair Burt condemns the attack saying "The UK strongly condemns this atrocity. In targeting a busy mosque, the bombers claimed the lives of peaceful worshippers and passers by. Our thoughts are with the families of the 22 people who have lost their lives so far, and the many more injured."
- United States President Barack Obama condemned the "outrageous terrorist attacks" saying "The murder of innocent civilians in their place of worship is an intolerable offense, and those who carried it out must be held accountable. Together, the people of the world must condemn and oppose all forms of terrorism, and support the universal right of human beings to live free from fear and senseless violence." Secretary of State Hillary Clinton issued a statement condemning the terrorist attack and extending sympathy to the families and loved ones of those injured and killed. Clinton also called for the perpetrators of the attack to be held accountable for their actions. She also added that due to the spate of attacks preceding this in Uganda, Pakistan, Afghanistan, Iraq, and Algeria was a reason for "global community's need to work together to combat terrorist organisations that threaten the lives of innocent civilians all around the world." The statement came after Iranian accusations of American support for Jundullah following the arrest of Abdolmalek Rigi and accusations of having kidnapped Shahram Amiri. During a press briefing at the State Department on 16 July, spokesman PJ Crowley came under fire for his confusing messages in relation to condemnation of the bombings and Amiri when a reporter asked about American intentions in regards to "trying to screw someone who screwed you guys".
- Ministry of Foreign Affairs Spokesperson Nguyen Phuong Nga said
  "Vietnam strongly condemns the terror attack in Iran on July 15, in which many people were killed and injured. We would like to extend our heart-felt condolences to the Iranian government and families of the victims. We hope the perpetrators will be properly punished."

== See also ==
- 2007 Zahedan bombings
- Islamic terrorism
- Shi'a–Sunni relations
