= 2019 Khash–Zahedan suicide bombing =

Terrorist attack in Iran

Coordinates: 28.881629°N 60.678916°E

- Location: Kurin District, Sistan-Baluchestan, Iran
- Date: 13 February 2019 (UTC+3½)
- Target: IRGC
- Attack type: Suicide car bombing
- Deaths: 28 (including the perpetrator)
- Injuries: 13
- Perpetrator: Jaish ul-Adl

On February 13, 2019, a suicide bombing on the Khash–Zahedan road in Sistan and Baluchestan Province of Iran killed at least 27 Revolutionary Guards and wounded another 13. It was one of the deadliest terrorist attacks in Iran in years. The Salafi jihadist militant organization Jaish ul-Adl ("Army of Justice") said it carried out the bombing.

== Bombing ==
The bomber targeted a bus transporting military personnel on the Khash–Zahedan road (Road 95) in Sistan and Baluchestan province, near the border with Pakistan. The area is a refuge for militant separatist groups and drug smugglers. The bomber detonated a car full of explosives near the bus, killing 27 Revolutionary Guards and injuring 13. The soldiers were coming back to their cities after carrying out the border mission by the bus.

Jaish al-Adl, a separatist militant group, and involved in some of the recent terrorist activities in southeast Iran, took responsibility for the attack. In October 2018, eleven Iranian border Guards were kidnapped by the group, with only five of them later released.

The Senior Revolutionary Guards commander of Iran claimed that the suicide bomber was a Pakistani national and one other member of the militant cell that planned the attack was also Pakistani. Furthermore, he claimed that three other members of militant cells were Iranian nationals from Sistan and Baluchestan. Out of those three Iranians, two were arrested.

== Reactions ==
Ali Khamenei, Supreme Leader of Iran declared that "It is evidently certain that the perpetrators of this crime are connected to the intelligence services of some of the countries inside as well as outside the region." Iranian president, Hassan Rouhani claimed that the United States of America was behind the attack on Iranian Revolutionary Guards bus. He also vowed revenge against Jaish Al-Adl.

Iran's Foreign Minister Mohammad Javad Zarif linked the suicide bombing targeting the country's elite Revolution Guard to an ongoing, U.S.-sponsored Mideast meeting in Warsaw. Zarif tweeted Wednesday night: "Is it no coincidence that Iran is hit by terror on the very day that #WarsawCircus begins? Especially when cohorts of the same terrorists cheer it from Warsaw streets & support it with Twitter bots?"

Iran's Deputy Foreign Minister Abbas Araghchi met with India's External Affairs Minister Sushma Swaraj and referring to both the 2019 Khash–Zahedan suicide bombing and the 2019 Pulwama attack, he stated: "Iran and India suffered from two heinous terrorist attacks in the past few days resulted in big casualties. Today in my meeting with Sushma Swaraj the Indian FM, when she had a stopover in Tehran, we agreed on close cooperation to combat terrorism in the region. Enough is enough!"

Iranian Major General Mohammad Ali Jafari alleged that the United States and Israel ordered Saudi Arabia and the United Arab Emirates to carry out the attack. He also asked Pakistan to conduct a crackdown against the armed group Jaish al-Adl before Tehran "takes it revenge." Pakistan offered Iran cooperation in investigating the bombing and expressed sympathy for the victims of the attack. A Pakistani delegation was due to travel to Iran.

Bahram Qassemi, Iran's Foreign Ministry spokesman declared "Tehran will avenge the attack" and said it would not tolerate what it saw as Pakistan's "inability to stop cross-border attacks in Iran." Ali Larijani, Iran's parliament speaker blamed Pakistan for the attack, saying that the attack was "planned and carried out from inside Pakistan". Muhammad Beghari, the military commander of Iran, told Pakistan to "either confront the terrorist groups or allow Iranian forces in."

== Mourning ==
The mourning for the victims was held one day after the attack in Isfahan, Iran. The bodies of the victims were flown to Isfahan where press representatives and the affected families were waiting. The mourning ceremony was widely covered by media in Iran and the interview with families of the victims went viral in Iranian social media.

== See also ==
- 2010 Zahedan bombings
- 2009 Zahedan bombing
- 2007 Zahedan bombings
- Ahvaz military parade attack
- Sistan and Baluchestan insurgency
