= 2009 Pishin bombing =

Terrorist attack in Iran

Pishin bombing
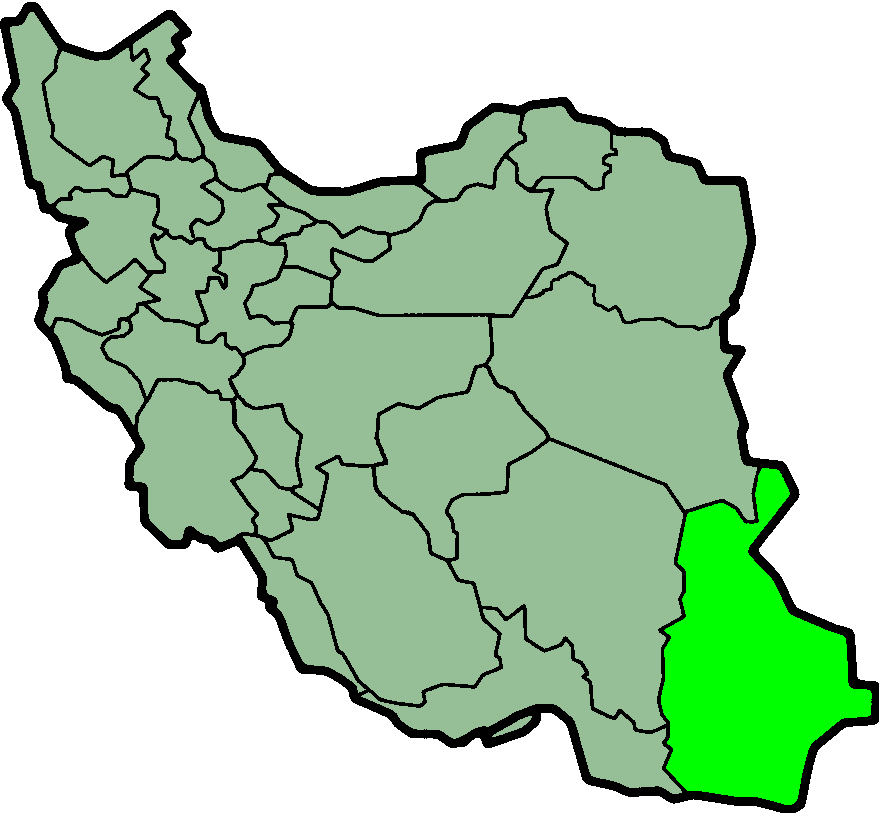
- Location of Sistan and Baluchestan Province within Iran
- Location: 26°5′13″N 61°45′37″E; Pishin in Sistan and Baluchestan Province
- Date: October 18, 2009 (UTC+04.30)
- Attack type: Suicide bombing
- Weapon: Suicide Bomb
- Deaths: 43
- Injuries: 150
- Perpetrator: Jundallah

The 2009 Pishin bombing occurred on October 18, 2009, when a suicide bomber detonated explosives at a meeting in the southeastern Iranian town of Pishin in Sistan and Baluchestan Province. The attack killed at least 43 people including several notable Islamic Revolutionary Guard Corps (IRGC, or Revolutionary Guards) commanders, and injured a further 150.

Among those killed were Noor Ali Shooshtari, the deputy commander of the Revolutionary Guard's ground forces, Rajab Ali, the commander in Sistan-Baluchestan, the commander for the town of Iranshahr and the commander of the Amir Al-Momenin unit. About 10 senior tribal figures were also among the dead. The Revolutionary Guard leaders killed were buried two days later in a military funeral. The funeral was attended by thousands of mourners. Forty-three people were killed, and another died in the hospital.

Iran blamed the United States for involvement in the attacks, as well as Saudi Arabia and the United Kingdom for their support of the Jundallah terrorist group. The United States denied involvement. President Mahmoud Ahmadinejad vowed a "swift response" to the attacks; the Islamic Republic News Agency (IRNA) quoted him as saying, "The criminals will soon get the response for their inhuman crimes." The incident was condemned by the United Nations Security Council.

The chargé d'affaires of Pakistan was summoned by the Iranian Foreign Ministry as the attack was thought to have been launched from Pakistani soil. Iran accused Pakistani agents of involvement in the incident and called on Pakistan to apprehend the attackers. An Iranian delegation demanded Pakistan handover Jundullah chief Abdolmalek Rigi. This decision came after Pakistan's Interior Minister Rehman Malik denied Rigi was on Pakistani soil. Pakistan handed over to Iran the brother of the Jundullah leader Abdolmalek Rigi. Iran's police chief held Pakistan responsible for the attack.

Several suspects were later arrested by Iran.

== Reaction ==
Iran – The Government and Media of Iran blamed the United States, the United Kingdom, and Israel for the attack.

Pakistan – Interior Minister Rehman Malik said, "we can even point out his [Abdul Malik Rigi's] exact location in Afghanistan".

== See also ==
- 2007 Zahedan bombings (a previous Jundallah attack that targeted the Revolutionary Guards)
