= Baluchi Autonomist Movement =

Baloch guerrilla movement in Iran

The Baluchi Autonomist Movement (BAM) was an ethnic Baluchi guerrilla movement in Iranian Balochistan during the 1980s. The movement was supported by the Iraqi government. The BAM's main demands were limited autonomy and economic concessions for Iranian Baluchis. After the Iran–Iraq War, the BAM members fled to neighboring Arab Persian Gulf nations, which led to the dissolution of the group. The group had maintained links with Baloch militants and insurgents in Pakistan. However, unlike the Pakistani Baloch militants/insurgents the Baluchi Autonomist Movement didn't have any military success of any sort.

Many groups have later claimed to be the Baluchi Autonomist Movement's successors, including Jundallah (Iran), Hizbul Furqan, Jaish al-Adl, Ansar Al-Furqan.

== See also ==
- Jundallah
- Iran–Iraq War
- People's Mujahedin of Iran
