= Mahabad parade bombing =

2010 terrorist attack in Iran

- Location: Mahabad, West Azerbaijan, Iran
- Date: September 22, 2010 (UTC+4½)
- Target: Military parade
- Attack type: Bombing
- Deaths: 12
- Injuries: 35–75

The Mahabad parade bombing was a bombing that took place on September 22, 2010 in the Iranian city of Mahabad, West Azerbaijan Province. The bombing occurred during a military parade, which came at the 30th anniversary of start of the Iran–Iraq War. As a result of the bombing 12 civilians were killed and at least 35 wounded. According to the Los Angeles Times, the number of wounded was 75, 12 of them badly injured. The number of wounded victims had reached 81, reported by medics, according to France 24. Vahid Jalalzadeh, the provincial governor said that most of the people affected by the attack were women and children, according to the guardian. According to the CS monitor, It was reported that the bomb was placed out of sight, close to the seats of senior Iranian military personnel.

No group claimed responsibility for the attack, however the local governor blamed the attack on "counter-revolutionary groups". Later, Abdolrasoul Mahmoudabadi, the commander of the Iranian Revolutionary Guard in the province, attributed the bombing to former officers of the Iraqi Ba'ath party and American mercenaries.

== Aftermath ==
In the following cross-border raid on Iraq, which took place several days later, the Iranian Revolutionary Guards and Basij militias allegedly killed 30 "perpetrators of deadly bombing at a military parade in western Iran". According to Aljazeera, Iran News Agency reported that three people were arrested whom are linked to bombing in the city of Mahabad.

== See also ==
- 2007 Zahedan bombings
- Terrorism in Iran
