= Jaysh al-Adl =

Sunni Islamist-jihadist Baloch militant group in Iran

- Logo of the group
- Leaders: Salahuddin Farooqui (2012 – 2024) †; Amir Naroui †; Hashem Nokri †
- Founded: 2012
- Dates active: 2012–2025
- Dissolved: 2026
- Merged into: People's Fighters Front
- Country: Iran; Pakistan
- Active regions: Iran; Sistan and Baluchestan; Pakistan; (Balochistan, Pakistan) Balochistan
- Ideology: Baloch nationalism; Sunni Islamism; Jihadism (Sunni); Separatism; Sectarianism; Anti-Iranian sentiment; Anti-Shia
- Status: Dissolved
- Size: 500
- Wars: Insurgency in Balochistan: Sistan and Baluchestan insurgency

Jaysh al-Adl (Balochi: جيش‌ العدل, lit. 'Army of Justice') was a Sunni Islamist and Jihadist Baloch militant organization that conducted its operations in the Sistan and Baluchestan province in Southeastern Iran alongside the Iran–Pakistan border. In December 2025, Jaysh al-Adl and other Baloch nationalist organizations announced merging into a single united organization, the People's Fighters Front (PFF).

The Foreign Ministers of China, Iran, Pakistan, and Russia have said that the group was based in Afghanistan. Jaysh al-Adl's ideology included Deobandi jihadism and Salafi jihadism. The group had claimed responsibility for several attacks against military personnel in Iran. The group had asserted that it was a separatist group fighting for independence of Sistan and Baluchistan and greater rights for the Baloch people. The group also maintains ties with Ansar al-Furqan, which was another Iranian Baloch armed group operating in Iran. Salahuddin Farooqui was the head of Jaysh al-Adl until his death in a joint Pakistani-Iranian operation in 2024. His brother, Amir Naroui, was killed by the Taliban-led Islamic Emirate of Afghanistan. Jaysh al-Adl had strongly denounced Iranian intervention in the Syrian civil war.

The group was founded in 2012 by members of Jundallah, a Sunni militant group that had been weakened following Iran's capture and execution of its leader, Abdolmalek Rigi, in 2010. Its first major attack took place in October 2013. Jaiyh al-Adl was a designated terrorist organization by Iran, China, Pakistan, Japan, New Zealand, Russia, and the United States.

In the wake of the Twelve-Day War, Jaysh al-Adl reportedly called on the people of Balochistan to join the group. Iranian state media had alleged that Saudi Arabia and the United States were key backers of the group.

== Attacks ==
=== First attacks ===
On 25 August 2012, 10 members of the IRGC were killed in an attack.

On 25 October 2013, the group claimed responsibility for killing 14 Iranian border guards in the city of Saravan. The group claimed that the attack was in retaliation of 16 Iranian Baloch prisoners who were on death row. The prisoners were convicted of drug trafficking and extremism. As result of the attack, Iranian officials hanged 16 prisoners on 26 October 2013. Weeks later, on 6 November, two attackers opened fire on Musa Nuri's vehicle in the city of Zabol, province of Sistan and Balochistan. At least two people were killed in the attack, including Nuri, the Zabol city prosecutor, and his driver. Jaysh al-Adl claimed responsibility for the attack, as well as for the hanging of the prisoners days before. Nine days later, militants attacked a patrol of the border guard, killing fourteen guards and wounding six more.

On 2 December of the same year, militants attacked an outpost in Saravan, killing one guard and wounding four, in response to the execution of 16 terrorists. Two weeks later, a roadside mine detonated against members of the Iranian Revolutionary Guard Corps (IRGC) in the city of Saravan, Sistan and Balochistan province, killing three soldiers. Jaysh al-Adl claimed responsibility for the attack even in retaliation for the hanging of the 16 militiamen.

=== Intensification of attacks ===
On 2 February 2014, terrorist abducted five Iranian border guards in Sistan and Baluchistan, being transferred to Pakistan. One of the hostages was killed sometime in March 2014, while the other four were released on 4 April 2014. Jaysh al-Adl claimed responsibility for the kidnappings.

On 9 October, Iran's state news agency reported that three members of Iranian security forces were killed by Jaysh al-Adl. According to the news agency, the militants had called the police emergency line and once the members of security forces reached the area, they were attacked by militants belonging to Jaysh al-Adl. Previously, one Iranian soldier was killed and two pro-government militiamen were wounded in an attack that was blamed on Jaysh al-Adl.

On 6 April 2015, eight Iranian border guards were killed in a cross-border attack from Pakistan. Four days later, Jaysh al-Adl attacked an Islamic Revolutionary Guard Corps (IRGC) patrol, killing two officers in the attack. On 4 November of the same year, an explosive device detonated near a police vehicle in the Qasre Qand area, injuring four officers.

It was not until 6 January 2017, when the Group opened fire on an IRGC patrol in Jakigour, Sistan and Balochistan, killing one soldier and wounding three more. On 26 April 2017, the group claimed responsibility for an ambush that killed at least nine Iranian border guards and injured two others. The Iranian border guards were patrolling the Pakistan–Iran border when they were attacked.

On 11 March 2018, four Jaysh al-Adl attackers (including two suicide bombers), killing all the attackers and wounding two Iranian soldiers. In April of the same year, an explosive device near a police post in Mirjaveh, killing three Iranian officers and three terrorists. On 26 June, terrorists again attacked an IRGC post in Mirjaveh, killing three terrorists and four soldiers in the attack. On 16 October, Jaysh al-Adl attack again in Mirjaveh poisoned and kidnapped 12 security personnel, and taken to Pakistan. Five hostages were freed on 15 November 2018, and four more hostages were freed on 22 March 2019. Jaysh al-Adl claimed responsibility for the kidnappings. In December 2018, the group took responsibility for a suicide bombing in the port city of Chabahar, killing two police officers and wounded forty-two others.

On 29 January 2019, the group took responsibility for a double bombing in Zahedan which wounded three police officers.

On 2 February 2019, Jaysh al-Adl claimed responsibility for the attack on Basij paramilitary base in south eastern Iran according to Tasnim News Agency. The attack left one paramilitary soldier dead and wounded five other.

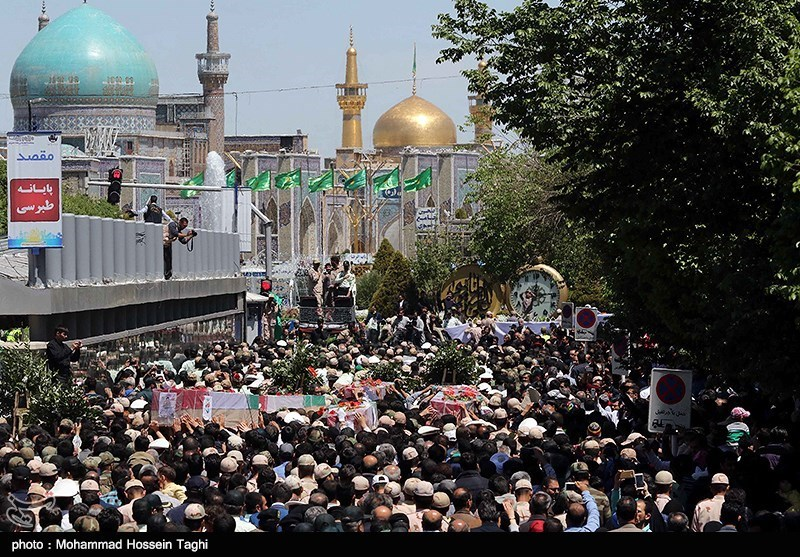
Funeral of Mirjaveh martyrs in Mashhad who were killed during Mirjaveh terrorist incident by Jaysh al-Adl

On 13 February 2019, a suicide bombing in Iran targeting a bus carrying IRGC personnel killed 27 people.

==== 2023 ====
On 30 June 2023, an explosive device detonated against an Islamic Revolutionary Guard Corps (IRGC) convoy in Kurin, Zahedan, Iran, injuring one soldier. Jaysh al-Adl later claimed responsibility for the attack.

On 8 July 2023, the group claimed responsibility for the attack on a police station in Zahedan killing two police officers. All four armed perpetrators died at the scene.

On 15 December 2023, the group conducted an attack targeting a police station in Rask, Sistan and Baluchistan Province and killing 11 police officers.

==== 2024 ====
On 17 January 2024, just a day after Iran's missile attack on Pakistan, Jaysh al-Adl claimed to assassinate three IRGC officials including Colonel Hossein-Ali Javdanfar who was a IRGC commander for Sistan-Baluchistan Corps of Quds force.

On 4 April 2024, just three days after an Israeli airstrike destroyed the Iranian consulate building in Damascus, IRNA reported that the group targeted several military headquarters in the southern Iranian province of Sistan and Baluchestan, killing 16 Iranian soldiers (including troops from both the IRGC and Artesh). It was also reported that 18 militants were killed. Jaysh al-Adl, in a statement, announced that the purpose of this attack was to counter the Iranian government's plan titled "Makran Coastal Development Plan", which through the Islamic Republic of Iran's government was building planned settlements on the coast of Baluchistan and planning to move 7 million Shias settlers from the Fatemiyoun and Zainabiyoun brigades (primarily from Pakistanis in Iran and Afghans in Iran respectively) to the coastal area of Balochistan and settle them.

On 18 July 2024, An Iranian police officer was killed and two others injured in an armed attack in Iran's southeastern province of Sistan and Baluchistan, local police said on Friday.According to Iran's semi-official Mehr news agency, a group of gunmen in a sedan opened fire at a patrol unit in the city of Saravan late on Thursday, leaving several injured.

On 13 September 2024, at least 3 soldiers of the Iranian Border Guard Command were killed in an ambush in the Mirjaveh city of the south eastern province of Sistan Balouchestan near Pakistan-Iran border by the Jaysh al-Adl. The fatal casualties included an officer and two soldiers namely Second Lieutenant Mohammad Amin Narouei, Private Parsa Soozani, and Private Amir Ebrahimzadeh. One civilian present at the scene was also injured in the attack. The Jaysh al-Adl terrorist group, which was known for its violent activities and operates from neighboring Pakistan, had claimed responsibility for the assault. Following the recent incident, Iran's First Vice President Mohammad Reza Aref extended his condolences to the Iranian people and the families of the martyrs.

On 30 September 2024, at least 6 policemen were killed in separate attacks across different cities of the Iranian province of Sistan and Baluchestan. In one incident, an Iranian border guard was killed and 2 others sustained injuries in a clash with unidentified armed persons in the Parud intersection of the Rask district of Sistan and Baluchistan. In a similar incident, another Iranian Police personnel of the Ranger unit was shot dead by unidentified armed persons in the city of Khash. In another attack, an Iranian Foraja personnel sustained injuries when unidentified armed persons targeted a Domak police station in Zahedan, the capital city of Sistan and Baluchistan province. Similarly, an Iranian border guard was killed when unidentified armed persons targeted Makki station in Hirmand County. According to Iranian state media, Jaysh al-Adl claimed responsibility for all the attacks.

On 2 October 2024, a report published by the Friday Times on the growing amounts of Terrorism in Pakistan reported that "[the] Iran-based militant group Jaishul-Adl has been suspected of being involved in certain attacks in Balochistan, further complicating the security situation [in Pakistan]".

On 26 October 2024, 10 policemen were killed when a police convoy was attacked in Sistan and Baluchestan. Jaysh al-Adl claimed responsibility.

On 10 November 2024, five soldiers of the IRGC were killed in an ambush. The militants attacked a watchtower in Sirkan area of Saravan near the Iranian-Pakistani border on Sunday evening, killing five members of the IRGC's Basij paramilitary forces, Mansour Bijar, the governor-general of Sistan-Baluchistan, told the state-run television.

=== 2025 ===
On 22 August 2025, five police officers were killed in an ambush when two vehicles, a Hilux and an IKCO Samand, were travelling in the Daman area of Iranshahr County. Armed individuals opened fire on the vehicles, causing them to stop; following a brief exchange of gunfire, the armed individuals stole weapons belonging to the security forces. Eyewitnesses said that more casualties occurred, and a major number of security reinforcements flooded roads around the county.

== Losses ==
On 29 September 2018, Iranian authorities announced that they have killed four and injured two fighters belonging to Jaysh al-Adl in an ambush in Saravan. According to the authorities, the dead included group's second-in-command, Hashem Nokri.

On 26 December 2020, Iranian authorities hanged Abdulhamid Mir Baluchzehi on charges of killing two Iranian Revolutionary Guards in 2015. According to Iranian authorities, Mir Baluchzehi was a principal member of Jaysh al-Adl.

On 3 January 2021, Hassan Dehvari and Elias Qalandarzehi were hanged by Iranian authorities on charges of abduction, bombing, murder of security forces and civilians, and of working with the extremist Jaysh al-Adl. The pair were arrested by Iranian authorities in April 2014.

On 30 January 2021, Iran hanged Javid Dehghan, the former leader of Jaysh al-Adl, for the murder of two Islamic Revolutionary Guard Corps (IRGC) members in Sistan and Baluchestan Province.

On 10 August 2021, Tasnim News Agency reported that a clash took place between Taliban and Jaysh al-Adl in Afghanistan. Amir Naroui along with a leader of the Taher Shahouzi group and five Taliban fighters were killed in the clash. Amir Naroui was a prominent leader of Jaysh al-Adl and the brother of Salahuddin Farooqui.

On 16 January 2024, Iran claimed to have targeted Jaysh al-Adl's headquarters with ballistic missiles and drones in Pakistan's restive southwestern Baluchistan province. Pakistan condemned Iran for launching airstrikes that Tehran claimed targeted bases for a militant group. Islamabad angrily denounced the attack as a "blatant violation" of its airspace and said it killed two children. Two days later, Pakistan carried out strikes on separatist targets in Iran. Pakistani foreign ministry said hideouts used by BLA and BLF were successfully struck in the operation.

On 5 November 2024, a joint operation between Pakistan and Iran killed 12 militants, including Salahuddin Farooqui, the group's leader. The second and third in command were also among the dead.

On 8 November 2024, Iran's Islamic Revolutionary Guard Corps (IRGC) intensified its crackdown in Sistan and Balochistan, killing more militants of Jaysh al-Adl.

On 27 August 2025, the IRGC announced that they launched a joint intelligence based counterterrorism operation with police in the Sistan and Baluchestan following an 22 August ambush on police in which five officers were killed by Jaysh al-Adl, According to the statement, 13 militants belonging to Jaysh al-Adl were killed in clashes and a number of others arrested.

== Merger ==
In December 2025, Jaysh al-Adl, Nasr Movement, Pada Baloch Movement, Muhammad Rasul Allah Group and other militias announced the formation of a single united organization called the "People's Fighters Front" (PFF), or Jabheh-yi Mubarizin-i Mardumi (JMM in Balochi and Persian).
