= Abdolhamid Rigi =

Iranian terrorist (1979–2010)

- Born: c. 1979; Sistan and Balochistan, Iran
- Died: May 24, 2010 (aged 30–31); Zahedan, Sistan and Balochistan, Iran
- Cause of death: Execution by hanging
- Military career
- Allegiance: Jundallah (Soldier of God)
- Service years: 1998–2005
- Rank: Brother of Commander-in-chief
- Conflicts: Balochistan conflict

Abdolhamid Rigi (Persian: عبدالحمید ریگی; also spelt Abdul-hamid Rigi or Abdulhamid Rigi; c. 1979 – May 24, 2010) was the elder brother of the leader of Jundallah, Abdolmalek Rigi. Like his brother, he was a member of the militant Sunni Islamist organization, which is widely recognized as a terrorist group. He was executed by hanging in prison on May 24, 2010.

== Detention ==
Rigi was arrested by Pakistani forces and transferred to Iranian officials in 2008 with 13 other militants. He was tried through the Iranian judiciary system, and was convicted of membership in the terrorist group, Jundallah (God's Soldiers); insurgency; smuggling; participating in the bombing and killing of civilians and police, including the Revolutionary Guards; as well as being mohareb (at war with God). He was sentenced to death through capital punishment.

== Death sentence ==
Rigi was supposed to have been executed in 2009 with others, but was only executed on May 24, 2010, by hanging in Zahedan's jail in front of his victims' relatives.

After the execution, his parents-in-law were interviewed. They said Rigi was a "brutal criminal". They also asked for the cooperation of Pakistan to return his children to Iran.

== Film ==
The Iranian film When the Moon Was Full, written and directed by Narges Abyar in 2019, which won several awards at the Fajr International Film Festival, tells the story of AbdolHamid Rigi and his wife.

== See also ==
- 2009 Zahedan explosion
- When the Moon Was Full
