= Harakat Ansar Iran =

Sunni militant organization

- Harakat Ansar Iran
- Leaders: Mohammad Shafi †; Abu Hafs al Baloochi †
- Dates active: 2012–2013
- Active regions: Sistan and Baluchestan Province, Iran
- Ideology: Salafist jihadism anti-Islamic Republic of Iran
- Wars: Sistan and Baluchestan insurgency

Harakat Ansar Iran (Persian: حرکت انصار ایران, lit. 'Movement of the Partisans of Iran') was a Sunni militant organization active from 2012 to 2013 in the Sistan and Baluchestan insurgency. It is a designated terrorist organization by Iran and Japan. It was one of two militant groups, along with its ally Jaish ul-Adl, which split from Jundallah after the arrest of its leader in 2010.

Harakat Ansar was initially led by Mohammad Shafi who was killed in Pakistan. After his death, Hesham Azizi a.k.a. Abu Hafs al Baloochi became the leader. According to Mashregh News, the group received support from Saudi Arabia and the Taliban.

The group later dropped "Iran" from their name, calling themselves Harakat al-Ansar (Arabic: حرکة الانصار), which uses Arabic rather than the former Persian name. The group merged with Hizbul-Furqan and formed Ansar Al-Furqan in late 2013.
