= Ansar Al-Furqan =

Jihadist Arab and Baloch militant organization

- Ansar Al-Furqan uses the Black Standard
- Leaders: Hesham Azizi † (2013–2015); Jalil Qanbarzehi † (2015–2017); Muhammad Dhahir Baluch (2017–present)
- Dates active: 2013–present
- Headquarters: Unknown
- Active regions: Sistan and Baluchestan province Khuzestan province
- Ideology: Sunni Islamism; Jihadism; Anti-Khomeinism
- Status: Active (low-level)
- Size: Unknown
- Wars: Sistan and Baluchestan insurgency Arab separatism in Khuzestan

Ansar Al-Furqan (Arabic: انصار الفرقان, lit. 'Partisans of the Criterion') is a Sunni Islamist militant organization active in the Sistan and Baluchestan insurgency, as well as Arab separatism in Khuzestan.

The group was established in December 2013 by a merger of Harakat al-Ansar (Arabic: حرکةالانصار) and Hizbul-Furqan (Arabic: حزب‌الفرقان). The organization is a designated terrorist organization by Iran, Pakistan and China.

== Attacks ==
According to Terrorism Research & Analysis Consortium, the organization has ties to Al-Qaeda, Katibat al Asad Al 'Islamia, Jeish Muhammad, the Al-Nusra Front, Hay'at Tahrir al-Sham and Jaish-ul-Adl.

On June 13, 2016, militants attempted to carry out an attack in Khash, Sistan and Baluchestan, leaving five terrorist and an officer dead in the ensuing clash. During the 2017–18 Iranian protests, Ansar Al-Furqan claimed responsibility for bombing an oil pipeline in Ahvaz, a city located in Iran's Khuzestan province.

They also took responsibility for 2018 Chabahar suicide bombing which killed two policemen and injured around 48 people. Days later, Iranian authorities arrested ten suspects in carrying out the attack.

On January 25, 2024, they claimed that it fired small arms targeting a police station in Zahedan, Sistan and Baluchistan Province.
