= 2009 Zahedan bombing =

Terrorist attack in Iran

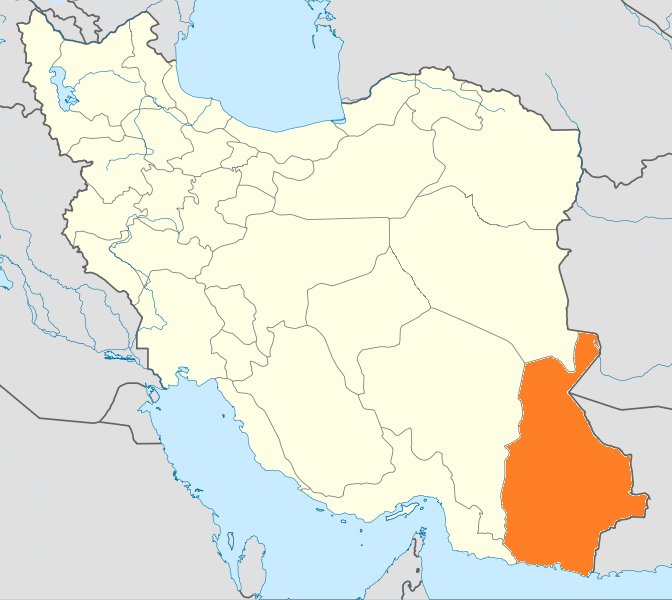
- Sistan and Baluchistan Province shown within Iran
- Location: 29°28′59″N 60°51′53″E; Zahedan, Iran
- Date: 28 May 2009
- Deaths: 30
- Injuries: 60
- Perpetrator: Jundullah

The 2009 Zahedan bombing was an explosion on 28 May 2009, that occurred during Maghrib prayers in Zahedan killing 30 people and wounding 60. There was no immediate claim of responsibility. The governor of Sistan and Baluchestan reported that "a group of terrorists were arrested as they were trying to escape from the province".

== Background ==
Zahedan is the capital of Sistan and Baluchestan province, shares a border with Pakistan and is the scene of frequent clashes between Iranian police and drug dealers, and militants and terrorists such as Jundallah. In 2007, there was another bombing in the same region that killed eleven people.

== Motive ==
This explosion probably was carried out by a group seeking to start a war between Shiite and Sunni Muslims. One day after the attack, Abdel Raouf Rigi, described as a spokesman for the Jundallah group, told Saudi-owned TV channel Al-Arabiya that a suicide bomber had targeted a secret meeting of Iran's elite Revolutionary Guards inside the Amir al-Momineen mosque.

On May 30, 2009, three men convicted of smuggling the bombing material and explosives from Pakistan to Iran were publicly executed by hanging near the mosque. All three men were already in detention when bombing occurred and had been tried for a string of bombings claimed by Jundallah in past. A spokesman for the Sistan-Baluchestan provincial judiciary said the three people "confessed to illegally bringing explosives into Iran and giving them to the main person behind the bombing".

== Attack ==
The Fars news agency quoted witnesses saying the incident had been a suicide attack. The bomb was suspected to have been put in a briefcase on the men's side of the mosque. The bomb is estimated to have been activated around the time for evening prayer, when the mosque was packed with worshippers on a public holiday. Amir al-Mohmenin mosque is an important shia mosque in Zahedan.

== Attribution ==
Ayatollah Ahmad Khatami stated that he believed the United States and Israel had a hand in the attack. He specifically accused the US of supporting Sunni rebels operating on the border with Pakistan, who are also linked the Al-Qaeda. He also stated "Although those who planted the bomb are the malicious and non-believer Wahabbis and Salafis, the real masterminds are others. Those who planned the crime wanted to undermine the Supreme Leader’s move to help build closer bonds between Shiites and Sunnis during his recent visit to Kurdestan. It is clear that our Shiite and Sunni brothers are vigilant about the plots of the enemies who wish to create discord among them". After three of the attackers were arrested, Khatami announced "According to the information obtained they were hired by America and the agents of the arrogance". Interior minister Sadegh Mahsooli also accused Israel and the US of supporting the terrorists. Jalal Sayah, deputy governor of Sistan and Baluchestan Province, accused the United States of sponsoring terror and hiring mercenaries to attack Iran. Iranian speaker of parliament Ali Larijani, three days after the terror attack claimed that Iran has intelligence reports regarding the United States links with certain terrorist groups operating against Iran and accused United States, of commanding them and trying to start a civil war between Shia and Sunni segments of Iranian society. Regarding the investigation of bombing, he said that Iran would want Pakistan to cooperate fully and not become a mere part of the designs against Iran.

The US denied the accusation, replying "We do not sponsor any form of terrorism anywhere in the world. Never have, never will."

== Reaction ==
- United States – White house Spokesmen Robert Gibbs said "The United States strongly condemns the recent terrorist attacks inside Iran, the American people send their deepest condolences to the victims and their families. No cause justifies terrorism, and the United States condemns it in any form, in any country, against any people." US State Department spokesman Ian Kelly stated "We condemn this attack in the strongest possible terms, and extend our sympathies to the families injured and killed, We note with concern a recent trend of bombings of Shiite mosques in Iraq and Pakistan as well as in Iran and strongly condemn any kind of sectarian driven violence."

== Jundallah ties to Al Qaeda and U.S. Military Intelligence ==
According to many sources, Jundallah has ties to al-Qaeda. Iran has been critical of the U.S. and U.K. governments for supporting Jundallah. Several sources such as the ABC News, Daily Telegraph, and journalist Seymour Hersh have also reported that Jundullah has received support from the United States against Iran.

== See also ==
- Jundallah
- Abdolmalek Rigi
- Ahvaz bombings
- 2007 Zahedan bombings
- July 2010 Zahedan bombings
