= Arrest of Abdolmalek Rigi =

The arrest of Abdolmalek Rigi, the leader of Jundallah group, took place on 23 February 2010 through an international operation by Iranian security forces. Rigi was extracted from a passenger jet on his way from Dubai, United Arab Emirates, to Bishkek, Kyrgyzstan. The Iranian Ministry of Intelligence had tracked Rigi's movements for five months before arresting him.

== Abdolmalek Rigi ==
Abdolmalek Rigi (Persian: عبدالمالک ریگی) was the leader of Jundallah, a militant group based in the Sistan and Baluchestan Province, Iran.

== Arrest operation ==
There are two conflicting versions of Rigi's arrest. According to the Iranian government, after visiting an American military base in Afghanistan on 23 February 2010, Rigi, with a forged Afghan passport, was a passenger of a flight which traveled from Dubai, United Arab Emirates to Bishkek, Kyrgyzstan. When the plane arrived at the Persian Gulf, Iranian fighter jets interrupted its route towards Bishkek airport. The Iranian jets were told to land in Iranian territory and added that "several foreign passengers were forcibly removed." Therefore, the plane landed in Bandar Abbas International Airport. Iranian forces then identified Rigi and arrested him. Other people boarded the plane and Iran's government gave gifts to the passengers to apologize for the delay. After his arrest, Iranian TV showed Rigi with hands tied being escorted by four masked Iranian commandos. Also, Fars News Agency broadcast a video of Rigi's arrest.

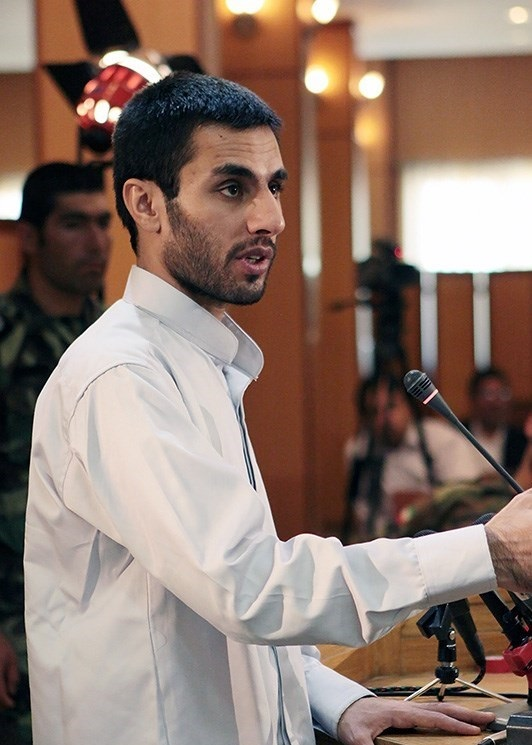
Abdolmalek Rigi in the Islamic revolutionary court after arrest by Iranian intelligence forces.

According to a former U.S. intelligence officer, on the other hand, Rigi was captured by Pakistani officials and delivered to Iran with U.S. support: "It doesn't matter what they say. They know the truth." The US has denied the Iranian version and denounced all claims that western intelligence organizations have supported Jundullah.

== In the popular media ==
Al Jazeera Satellite Channel announced that Rigi was arrested in Pakistan while Mostafa Mohammad-Najjar, interior minister, said: "Abdolmalek Rigi was arrested outside Iran while he was traveling somewhere and was transferred to Iran." He said to Press TV that Rigi was arrested Tuesday on a flight from Dubai to Kyrgyzstan. Also, Najjar claimed that the capture showed the supreme skill of Iran's Ministry of Intelligence.

According to PBS, an informed source claimed Rigi was arrested by a Pakistani intelligence agency, while Moslehi announced that no other intelligence services helped in the arresting operation, and that Iranian intelligence forces had tracked his movements for five months and then arrested him. Pakistan declared it had co-operated with Iran in arresting Jundullah members but did not specifically mention Rigi.

Al-Alam announced Rigi had been arrested along with three members of the Jundullah group.

Al Arabiya television depicted this arrest as a serious blow for the Jundullah group.

A website affiliated with Jundullah claimed that Rigi was arrested by was arrested by the intelligence services of the United States, Pakistan and Afghanistan, and then moved to Iran. This website further claimed that Iran was too weak to manage Rigi's arrest.

== Rigi's post-arrest statements ==
In post-arrest statements, Rigi claimed that the US promised to provide military equipment and a military base near borders of Iran. Iranian state television broadcast Rigi's declarations about American support to the Jundullah group. He stated that: "The Americans said Iran was going its own way and they said our problem at the present is Iran not Al-Qaeda and not the Taliban, but the main problem is Iran. We don't have a military plan against Iran. Attacking Iran is very difficult for us (the US). They (Americans) promised to help us (Jundullah) and they said that they would co-operate with us, free our prisoners and would give us military equipment, bombs, machine guns, and they would give us a base." He declared that he had had a meeting with a senior person at the Manas US military base in Kyrgyzstan.

== Post-arrest reactions ==
=== Iran ===
After Rigi's arrest, Iranian officials declared the capture a victory over America, Britain and Israel, which it claimed had supported him and his group. Heydar Moslehi, intelligence minister of Iran, stated that: "We have clear documents proving that Rigi was in co-operation with American, Israeli and British intelligence services." He also stated that Rigi had been in a US military base 24 hours before his arrest. Mohammad-Hassan Aboutorabi Fard, Iran's deputy Parliament speaker, said: "The arrest showed that Iran has great power to cut off the hands of criminals and defuse plots of the arrogant powers as well as those made by the US and its mercenaries."

=== United States ===
After Rigi's arrest, US officials denied any link with Rigi and his group.

=== Britain ===
The British government said, "Abdolmalek Rigi is a terrorist responsible for despicable attacks which have killed many innocent Iranians. The United Kingdom has always condemned such actions."
