= Mohammad Jorjandi =

Iranian cybercrime and cybersecurity expert

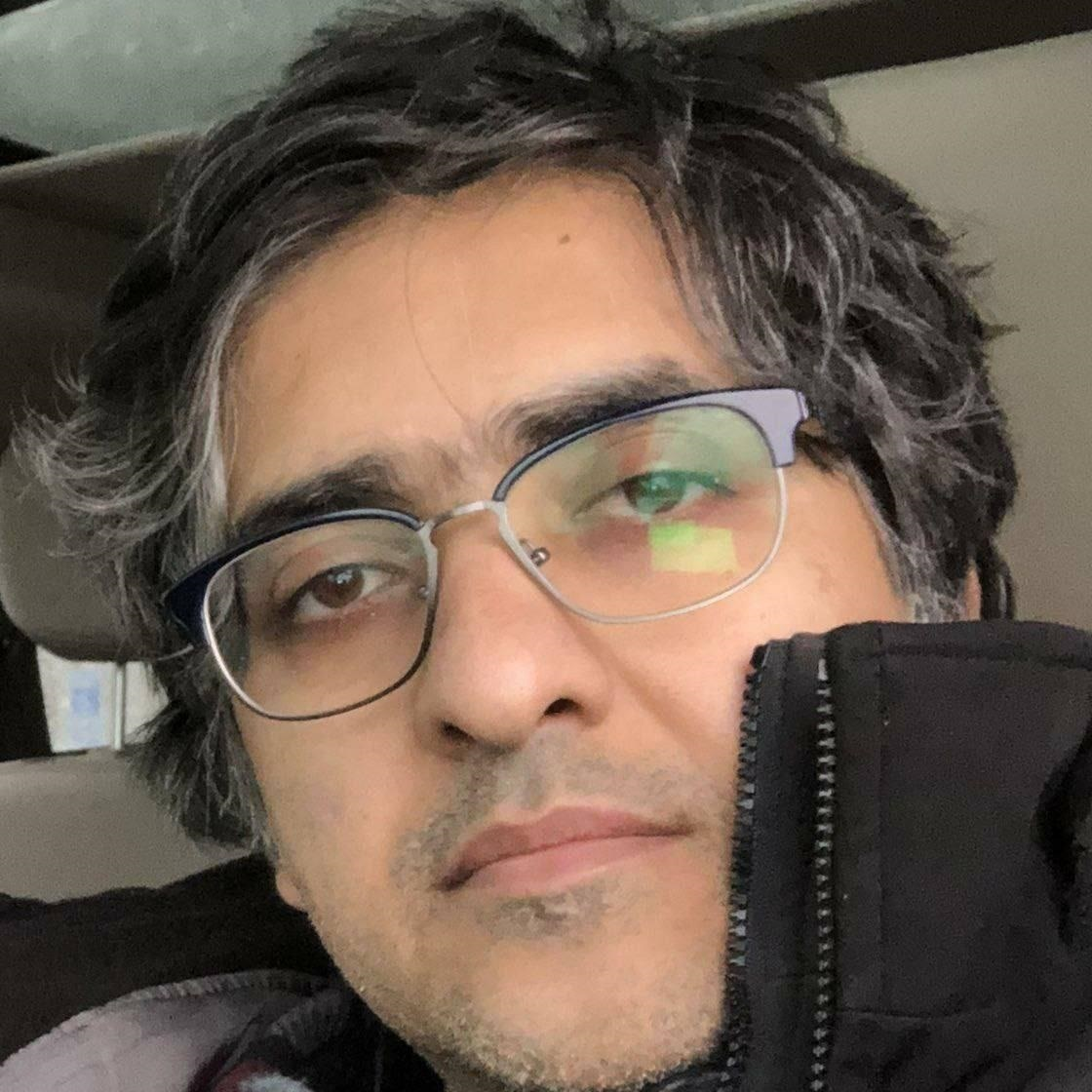
- Born: November 21, 1980 (age 45); Zahedan
- Other names: hregy, s7az2mm
- Occupations: Cybercrime expert, Cybersecurity expert
- Notable work: Webamooz, Independent Iranian Cybercrime Investigators

Instagram information
- Page: webamoozir
- Followers: 209 thousand (April 25, 2025)

YouTube information
- Channel: Mohammad Jorjandi
- Subscribers: 44.1 Thousand (April 25, 2025)
- Views: 5.88 Million (April 25, 2025)
- Website: https://ScamMinder.com

Mohammad Jorjandi (Persian: محمد جرجندی; born 21 November 1980) is a cybercrime expert. He was the director of the Shabgard security group. He was hired by the Central Bank of Iran as the director of Kashef (Bank Emergency Network Security Control Center). He immigrated to the United States from Iran in 2015. After his immigration, he started studying cyber security, a branch of cybercrime, and created a social media called "Webamooz", to investigate cybercrimes in Iran. Jorjandi published large cases of cybercrimes committed in Iran in Webamooz, including a YouTube channel and Instagram. He was one of the first people to investigate the illegal gambling network in Iran and ever since he has attracted people's attention to himself and his media. He has been invited as an expert in different programs in BBC Persian, VOA and Iran International.

In October 2026, the Committee to Protect Journalists issued a statement condemning digital harassment Jorjandi was receiving on online platforms such as Instagram and Telegram. This included smears alleging that he was an intelligence operative; a money launderer; and a sanctions evader.
