= Yadollah Javani =

Iranian politician

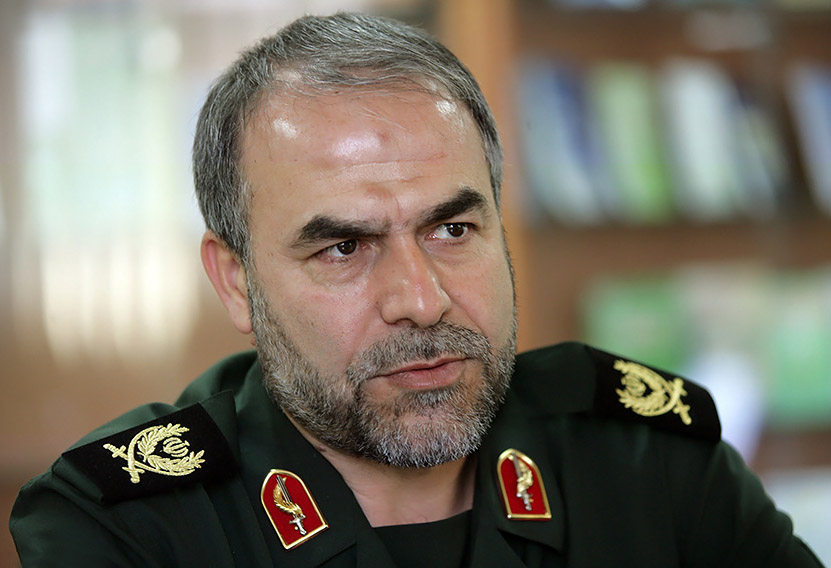

Yadollah Javani is a Brigadier General and the head of the political bureau of the Islamic Revolutionary Guard Corps, the powerful and influential branch of Iran's military, founded after the Iranian revolution.

Javani has been notable for his firm stand against protests following the 2009 Iranian presidential election. Before the election, Javani had stated that a "velvet revolution" would be "quashed before it is born." Javani has attacked opposition leaders, who claimed the election was fraudulent, of causing the unrest as well as killing civilians in the Basij forces. "In this election, for the first time, certain candidates claimed fraud and by causing unrest killed and injured many, including 8 members of the Basij." According to outlookseries.com, the official Iranian IRNA news agency reports that Javani has called for the prosecution of opposition leaders Mir Hossein Moussavi, former President Mohammed Khatami, and defeated presidential candidate Mehdi Karroubi, for inciting violence.
