= Muhammad Dhahir Baluch =

Leader of Jundallah

Mohammad Dhahir Baluch (Persian: محمد ظاهر بلوچ) is the former leader of Jundallah. Dhahir Baluch led Jundallah from February 2010 to 2012. According to the Islamic Republic News Agency, he is the main suspect of the bombings in Zahedan on 16 July 2010 and the Chabahar bombings. He is wanted by the Iranian judiciary.
