= Daman Castle =

Castle in Sistan and Baluchestan Province, Iran

Daman castle
- قلعه دامن

General information
- Type: Castle
- Location: Iranshahr County, Iran

Daman castle (Persian: قلعه دامن) is a historical castle located in Iranshahr County in Sistan and Baluchestan Province, The longevity of this fortress dates back to the Qajar dynasty.
