= Jundallah (Iran) =

Iranian separatist group (2003–2011)

- جندالله
- Insignia of Jundallah
- Leaders: Abdolmalek Rigi (executed); Muhammad Dhahir Baluch (2010–2012)
- Dates active: 2003–2012
- Active regions: Sistan and Baluchestan Province
- Ideology: Anti-Shi'ism; Baloch nationalism; Separatism
- Size: 200–2,000
- Wars: Insurgency in Balochistan: Sistan and Baluchestan insurgency

Jundallah (Arabic: جندالله, lit. 'Soldiers of God'), also known as the People's Resistance Movement of Iran (PRMI), was a Sunni Jihadist militant organization based in Sistan and Baluchestan, a province in southeast Iran. The group shared its name with another Baloch group, Pakistan's Jundallah, which was active in Pakistani Balochistan as part of the same insurgency, the Insurgency in Balochistan. Iran's Jundallah claimed to have been fighting for the "equal rights of Sunni Muslims in Iran".

The organization was founded in 2003 by Abdolmalek Rigi, an ethnic Balochi. Rigi was captured and executed at Evin Prison in Tehran in 2010. It was believed to have between 700 and 2,000 fighters however stated by Abdolmalek Rigi, they (Jundallah) only had an active force of 200. Jundallah commanders claim the group had killed up to 400 Iranian soldiers.

Jundallah had been officially designated as a terrorist organization by Iran, Japan, New Zealand and the United States. The U.S. Department of State said that, "Jundallah, which was designated as an FTO and SDGT in 2010, began using the new name Jaysh al-Adl and associated aliases in 2012." It has been linked to and taken credit for numerous acts of terror, kidnappings and the smuggling of narcotics. According to many sources, the group was linked to Al-Qaeda.

== Background ==
Jundallah was thought to have begun in 2003 and it is known for attacks against high-profile Iranian targets, both military and civilian. Its origin and structure remain unclear. It had been suggested that it might be an offshoot of Baluchi Autonomist Movement, which was created and supported by Saddam Hussein along with other militant groups like Mujahideen-e Khalq, to wage a proxy war on Iran during the Iran–Iraq War. There appears to be at least another militant organization with the name of Jundallah operating independently in Pakistan.

Iran accuses the United States and other foreign elements of backing Jundallah, possibly from Pakistani territory with Islamabad's support, despite Pakistan's alleged history of cooperation with Iran to suppress trans-border militants, whereas Jundallah denies any connections to al-Qaeda or the Taliban, as well as foreign governments such as the United States and Great Britain. The United States also denies any support or involvement with this group.

In an 17 October 2008 interview aired on Al-Arabiya TV, its leader Abdolmalek Rigi stated the group had given "over 2,000 men" military, political and ideological training but that the number of its members "in the mountains does not exceed 200." It had also been alleged that Jundallah is involved in smuggling Iranian diesel fuel to Afghanistan and Pakistan, the price of which is more than five times cheaper than the diesel fuel in Afghanistan and Pakistan. The diesel fuel is then bartered with opium, which is smuggled into Iran from Afghanistan and Pakistan to be sold in Iran.

== Terrorist designation ==
Though the United States State Department under Hillary Clinton considered designating Jundullah as a terrorist organization in 2009, it wasn't until 3 November 2010, that it designated Jundallah as a Foreign Terrorist Organization, noting that Jundallah "had engaged in numerous attacks resulting in the death and maiming of scores of Iranian civilians and government officials. Jundallah uses a variety of terrorist tactics, including suicide bombings, ambushes, kidnappings and targeted assassinations." Iran hailed the decision.

== Views and goals ==
Jundullah have been referred to as separatists by various media, and Iranian leaders have stated that Jundullah is proxy group used by the enemies of Iran to destabilise the Islamic Republic. The group's (now dead) leader Abdolmalek Rigi, however, always denied the organization had any separatist agenda, or foreign links, claiming that they "merely fight for equal rights for Sunni Muslims" in predominantly Shi'a Iran.

In an interview with Rooz (an Iranian online newspaper), Rigi declared himself an Iranian and stating Iran was his home, and that he merely aimed at improving the lives of Sunni Baluchis in a democratic Iran. Dan Rather's US cable channel HDnet's television news magazine Dan Rather Reports, also interviewed Rigi and showed a video of Rigi personally cutting off his brother in-law Shahab Mansouri's head. In the same interview, Rigi described himself as "an Iranian" and denied that his goal is to form a separate Baluch state. He claimed that his goal is to "improve conditions for ethnic Baluchis", and that his group is "fighting exclusively for the rights of Sunni Muslims in Iran".

In an 17 October 2008, interview aired on Al-Arabiya TV, Abdolmalek stated, "the only thing we ask of the Iranian government is to be citizens. We want to have the same rights as the Iranian Shiite people. That's it." He described his group as an Islamic awakening movement but denied any ties with Al Qaeda or the Taliban. He also told the interviewer that despite the fact that "many of us have been martyred ... we are prepared to reach an understanding with the Iranian government, Insha Allah."

== International sponsorship ==
=== United States and Israel ===
A report by Brian Ross and Christopher Isham of ABC News in April 2007 alleged that Jundallah "had been secretly encouraged and advised by American officials" to destabilize the government in Iran, citing U.S. and Pakistani tribal and intelligence sources. The report alleges that U.S. Vice President Dick Cheney discussed the activity of the group against Iran during his visit to Pakistan. In a blog, the network stated that the support was believed to have started in 2005 and been arranged so that the U.S. provided no direct funding to the group, which would require congressional oversight and attract media attention, drawing parallels between American support for Jundallah and U.S. involvement in Nicaragua.

The report was denied by Pakistan official sources, but ABC stood by their claim despite the denial. Alexis Debat, one of the sources quoted by Ross and Isham in their report alleging U.S. support for the Jundullah, resigned from ABC News in June 2007, after ABC officials claimed that he faked several interviews while working for the company. Ross went on to say the Jundullah story had many sources, adding, "We’re only worried about the things Debat supplied, not about the substance of that story." According to Ross, ABC had found nothing that would undermine the stories Mr. Debat worked on. However, he acknowledged that as the stories of fabrications continue to roll in, the network "at some point had to question whether anything he said can be believed."; this caused the network, in 2007, to send a second team of producers to Pakistan investigating the original reports.

Gholamali Haddadadel, Iranian parliament speaker in 2007, told reporters that Jundallah is part of pressure tactics used by United States to subdue Iran, and hoped with Pakistani help, Iran would be able to defeat Jundallah.

On 2 April 2007, Abdolmalek Rigi appeared on the Persian service of Voice of America, the official broadcasting service of the United States government, which identified Rigi as "the leader of popular Iranian resistance movement" and used the title of "Doctor" with his name. This incidence resulted in public condemnation by the Iranian-American community in the U.S., many of whom are opponents of the Iranian government, as well as Jundallah.

Investigative journalist Seymour Hersh revealed another report in July 2008 that alleged that US congressional leaders had secretly agreed to former president George W. Bush's US$400 million funding request, which gives the US a free hand in arming and funding terrorist groups such as Jundullah militants.

Three days after the 2009 terror attack against Zahidan mosque, Iranian speaker of parliament Ali Larijani claimed, that Iran had intelligence reports regarding the United States links with certain terrorist groups operating against Iran and accused the United States of commanding them. He also said that the United States is trying to start a civil war between Shia and Sunni segments of Iranian society. Regarding the investigation of the terrorist act he added that Iran would want Pakistan to cooperate fully and not become a mere part of the designs against Iran.

According to a 2007 article in The Daily Telegraph, Jundallah is just one part of a Black Operation Plan involving psychological operations and other covert operations to support dissents among minorities (Baloch, Arab, Kurds, Azeris, etc.) in Iran, which along with tactics of military posturing, risky maneuvers and occasional conciliatory gestures are designed to improve United States bargaining position in any future negotiation with Iran. Furthermore, these Black Operations build upon a coordinated campaign consisting of disinformation, placement of negative newspaper articles, propaganda broadcasts, the manipulation of Iran's monetary currency and international banking transactions.

Iranian Interior Minister Mostafa Pour-Mohammadi had said United States intelligence operatives have been meeting and coordinating with Anti-Iranian militants in Afghanistan as well as encouraging drug smuggling into Iran. A former Chief of Army Staff of the Pakistan Army General Aslam Beg had accused the Coalition Forces in Afghanistan of training and supporting Jundallah against Iran.

After Rigi was arrested on 23 February 2010, Iran's intelligence minister Heydar Moslehi at a press conference in Tehran claimed that Rigi had been at a US base in Afghanistan 24 hours before his arrest. At a press conference, he flourished a photograph which he said showed Rigi outside the base with two other men, though he gave no details of where the base was, or how or when the photograph was obtained. Photographs were also shown of an Afghan passport and identity card said to have been given by the Americans to Rigi. Moslehi also alleged that Rigi had met the then NATO secretary-general, Jaap de Hoop Scheffer, in Afghanistan in 2008, and had visited European countries. He said agents had tracked Rigi's movements for five months, calling his arrest "a great defeat for the US and UK". On 25 February Iranian state television broadcast a statement by Rigi stating he had had American support and that

"The Americans said Iran was going its own way and they said our problem at the present is Iran… not al-Qaeda and not the Taliban, but the main problem is Iran. We don't have a military plan against Iran. Attacking Iran is very difficult for us (the US). They [Americans] promised to help us and they said that they would co-operate with us, free our prisoners and would give us [Jundullah] military equipment, bombs, machine guns, and they would give us a base."

BBC News carried a report on the statements, noting that "It is not possible to say whether Abdolmalek Rigi made the statement freely or under duress." The US had denied having links with Rigi's group, Jundullah. Reuters also reported that Geoff Morrell, Pentagon press secretary, dismissed claims by the Iranian government that Mr. Rigi had been at an American military base just before his arrest. Morrell called the accusations of American involvement "nothing more than Iranian propaganda." According to a former U.S. intelligence officer, Rigi was captured by Pakistani officials and delivered to Iran with U.S. support: "It doesn't matter what they say. They know the truth."

On 3 November 2010, the U.S. Department of State officially designated Jundallah as a Foreign Terrorist Organization, thereby making it a crime for any person in the United States or subject to the jurisdiction of the United States to knowingly provide material support or resources to Jundallah.

In January 2012, an article by Mark Perry questioned the validity of the previous allegations, asserting that the U.S. Central Intelligence Agency (CIA) "had barred even the most incidental contact with Jundallah." The rumors originated in an Israeli Mossad "false flag" operation; Mossad agents posing as CIA officers supposedly met with and recruited members of Jundullah in cities such as London to carry out attacks against Iran. President George W. Bush "went absolutely ballistic" when he learned of Israel's actions, but the situation was not resolved until President Barack Obama's administration "drastically scaled back joint U.S.-Israel intelligence programs targeting Iran" and ultimately designated Jundallah a terrorist organization in November 2010. Although the CIA cut all ties with Jundallah after the 2007 Zahedan bombings, the Federal Bureau of Investigation (FBI) and United States Department of Defense continued to gather intelligence on Jundallah through assets cultivated by "FBI counterterrorism task force officer"; the CIA co-authorized a 2008 trip McHale made to meet his informants in Afghanistan. According to The New York Times: "Current and former officials say the American government never directed or approved any Jundallah operations. And they say there was never a case when the United States was told the timing and target of a terrorist attack yet took no action to prevent it."

On 9 November 2014, The New York Times published an article on the front page of its Late Edition, which states that an FBI counterterrorism task force officer by the name of Thomas McHale "had traveled to Afghanistan and Pakistan and developed informants inside Jundallah's leadership, who then came under the joint supervision of the FBI and CIA."

=== United Kingdom ===
Iranian authorities also accused the United Kingdom of supporting Jundallah.

In a BBC production "Panorama: Obama and the Ayatollah", a terrorist organisation which had carried out acts of terror leading to death of civilians and children in Iran is briefly mentioned but not named, with the official prosecution files and their Interpol warrants blacked out in video. The international warrants call for their arrest under international anti-terrorism laws, which had not happened and Tehran blames western governments particularly the British government for protecting them from an international arrest.

=== Pakistan ===
Jundallah is also actively involved and conducts terrorist attacks having linked up with other banned religious groups since the start of 2011. Pakistan had worked with Iran especially during the time of the Shah in fighting many of the separatist groups in Balochistan. Pakistan's assistance in the capture and arrest of Jundallah's leader. Despite denials, a few Iranian MPs have often even castigated Pakistan's efforts in tackling the Baloch-based insurgency. Hossein Ali Shahriari, Zahedan's representative in parliament, rhetorically asked, "Why does our diplomatic apparatus not seriously confront the Pakistani government for harboring bandits and regime's enemies? Why do security, military and police officials not take more serious action?". It had been claimed, Jundallah can not operate with at least some degree of support from within Pakistan and that elements from within Pakistani security establishment, particularly ISI with financial support of Saudi Arabia and its supplementation through the largest opium black market in the world have woven a complicated web of drug smugglers and terrorists to project power in the region and beyond. General Hasan Firoozabadi of Iranian Army said, one of the main bases of Jundallah had been identified and pointed out to Pakistan and Iran is awaiting for Pakistan's action on the matter. In a rare criticism Iranian Intelligence minister after the Saravan attack claimed Pakistan is not meaningfully cooperating with Iran on the issue of Jundallah.

At least some Iranian analysts believe this huge transnational web comprising economic, political and military dimensions is ultimately being run by CIA (Special Activities Division), aiming to topple or at least weaken Iranian government; with Pakistan just being a pawn much like the earlier United States support for Mujahedin against Soviet Union with collaboration of Pakistan. These analysts believe the ideological element supporting Jundallah and similar groups come from religious madrassah's of Pakistan supported religiously and financially by the United States and Saudi Arabia.

=== Saudi Arabia ===
Iran considers Jundallah as a group connected to Taliban and their opium revenues, as well as receiving financial and ideological support directly from Saudi Arabia in collusion with other hard-line elements within Pakistan and Afghanistan. Others alleged that United States had long supported Low intensity conflict and assassinations with Saudi money, especially against nationalists, socialists, and Shias.

American journalist Dan Rather had traveled to Pakistan, United Arab Emirates, Sweden, and France investigating Jundallah and its funding sources. On the US cable channel HDnet's television news magazine Dan Rather Reports, he indicated that support comes from Balochis in Sweden where Radio Baloch FM is broadcast from Stockholm.

== Timeline ==
=== 2005 Attack on Iranian President ===
The motorcade of Iranian president Mahmoud Ahmadinejad was ambushed during his visit to Balochistan province, in which at least one of his bodyguards was killed and others injured.

=== 2006 Tasooki Attack ===
On 16 March 2006, four days before Iranian new year, Jundallah blocked a road near Tasooki and killed 21 civilians. A thirteen-year-old student on his way to new year holidays was caught in the crossfire.

=== 2007 Zahedan Bombing ===
On 14 February 2007, a car bomb and gunfire directed at a bus killed 18 members of the Islamic Revolutionary Guard Corps. Guards commander Qasem Rezaei said, "This blind terrorist operation led to the martyrdom of 18 citizens of Zahedan" and attributed the attack to "insurgents and elements of insecurity." Jundallah claimed responsibility for the attack on 15 February.

Iranian security forces also arrested five suspects, two of whom were carrying camcorders and grenades when they were arrested, while the police killed the main "agent" of the attack. Among the arrestees was Said Qanbarzehi, a Balochi, who was hanged in Zahedan prison on 27 May 2007. He had been sentenced to death at the age of 17 along with six other Balochi men—Javad Naroui, Masoud Nosratzehi, Houshang Shahnavazi, Yahya Sohrabzehi, Ali Reza Brahoui and Abdalbek Kahrazehi (also known as Abdalmalek)—in March 2007, despite the absolute international prohibition on the execution of child offenders. Two days later on Friday, 16 February 2007, Jundallah bombed a girls school in city of Zahedan and the leader of the group took responsibility.

=== Mass abduction ===
Jundallah militants kidnapped 21 Iranian truck drivers near Chabahar on 19 August 2007 and brought them to Pakistan. Pakistani forces later freed all of them.

=== Police abduction ===
In June 2008, 16 police officers in Saravan were abducted and brought into Pakistan. Jundullah claimed responsibility and subsequently demanded the release of 200 militants from the Iranian government. Some sources claim that one of the hostages was released in September 2008, while others assert that all 16 were killed by Jundullah in December.

=== Saravan Bombing ===
In a rare suicide bombing in Iran, a car bomb was driven into a security building in Saravan, on 29 December 2008. The explosion killed four Iranians.

=== Saravan Ambush ===
On 25 January 2009, 12 members of the Revolutionary Guards were ambushed and killed by Jundallah near Saravan.

=== Zahedan Mosque Blast ===
A bomb blast on 28 May 2009 rocked a mosque in the south-eastern Iranian city of Zahedan as mourners participated in a ceremony marking the death of the daughter of the prophet of Islam, which killed 25 people and injured 125 others, less than 3 weeks before the Iranian 2009 presidential elections. The Iranian government promptly accused the United States of having financed and orchestrated the attack in order to destabilize the nation in the leadup to its presidential election. Two days after the attack, three men were publicly hanged for smuggling the explosives used in the attack into Iran from Pakistan. The trio were already in prison at the time of attack and had been tried for previous attacks by Jundallah including the 2007 Zahedan bombings. Interior Minister Sadegh Mahsouli said in a statement posted on the Internet that "those who committed the Thursday bombing are neither Shia nor Sunni. They are Americans and Israelis." Abdel Raouf Rigi, the spokesman for Jundallah, claimed responsibility on a Saudi Arabian state owned TV channel, Al-Arabiya.

=== 2009 Pishin Bombing ===
On 18 October 2009, 42 people were killed in a suicide bombing in the Pishin District of Sistan-Baluchistan, including at least 6 officers in Iran's Revolutionary Guards, including the deputy commander of the Guards' ground force, General Noor Ali Shooshtari, and the Guards' chief provincial commander, Rajab Ali. Jundallah claimed responsibility.

=== Capture of Abdolmalek Rigi ===
On 23 February 2010, Iran captured Abdolmalek Rigi. Heydar Moslehi, Iran's minister of intelligence, claims Rigi was at an American military base in Afghanistan prior to his capture and was arrested on a flight from Dubai to Kyrgyzstan, but this had been disputed. Other accounts report that Rigi was apprehended in Pakistan and turned over to Iranian authorities.

On 26 February, Rigi appeared on Iranian TV, claiming that the U.S. promised him financial and military aid to fight the Iranian government, which the U.S. denied. He was executed on 20 June 2010 in the Evin Prison in Tehran.

== Activities following Rigi's execution ==
In the wake of Rigi's capture and execution, Al-Arab claimed that Jundallah named Muhammad Dhahir Baluch as his replacement.

=== 2010 Zahedan bombings ===
On 16 July 2010, 27 people were killed in a double suicide bombing at the Jamia mosque in Zahedan. The blasts, timed 20 minutes apart to maximize injuries, are believed to have killed several members of the Revolutionary Guard.

=== December 2010 Chah Bahar bombings ===
Two bombs near a mosque in south-eastern Iran which killed an estimated 39 people at a Shia mourning ceremony. The Fars news agency said there were four bombers: two of them detonating explosives attached to their belts, a third was shot at by Iran's intelligence service; and the fourth was arrested. Iran blamed Pakistan and its intelligence services, the ISI, for the attacks.

=== Offshoots ===
The Baluch militant groups Jaish ul-Adl and Harakat Ansar Iran recruited many members of Jundallah in their continued violent campaign against the Iranian state.

==== October 2012 Chah Bahar bombing ====
According to Voice of Russia, a suicide bomber attacked a mosque in south eastern Iran on 19 October 2012, killing one person and wounding several more worshippers who gathered for their Friday prayer. A Sunni group claimed responsibility for the attack, saying "We, the Mujahideen of Harakat Ansar Iran, proudly bring you the news of our first successful operation from our new series of operations code named Ra'ad (operation storm). In this operation, approximately 20 officers of the Iranian Revolutionary Guards (Pasadaran) were killed by an explosive-rigged van in the city of Chabahar, Iran, while one brother Mujahid, Hamza Saravani, was martyred."

== In literature ==
The Scriptwriter is the first English language novel written about Jundallah by a writer from the Pakistan/Iran region.

== See also ==
- Allegations of CIA assistance to Osama bin Laden
- Arrest of Abdolmalek Rigi
- Attack on Tasooki (2006)
- Baloch
- Baluchi Autonomist Movement
- CIA activities in Iran
- Iran–Iraq War
- Irregular Warfare
- List of designated terrorist organizations
- Opium production in Afghanistan
- Persecution of Shia Muslims
- Religious terrorism
- Sistan and Baluchistan Province
- Special Activities Division
