= Abdolmalek Rigi =

Iranian militant (1979–2010)

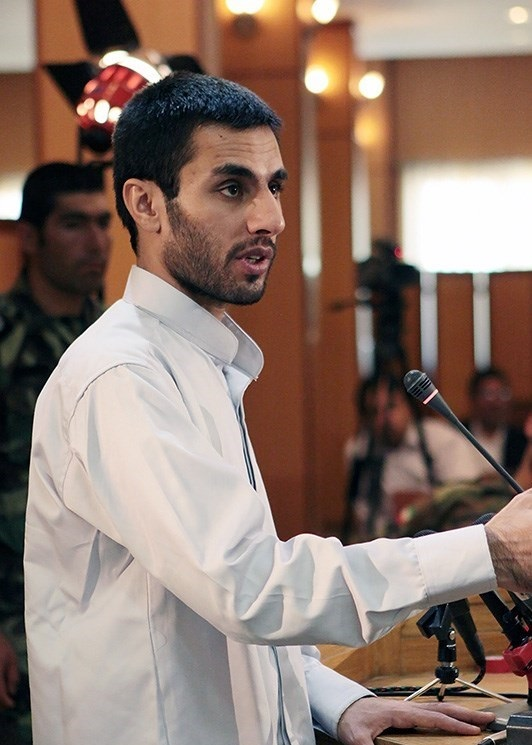
- Rigi on trial in Islamic Revolutionary Court, 18 June 2010
- Born: c. 1979; Sistan and Balochistan Province, Iran
- Died: 20 June 2010 (aged 31); Evin Prison, Tehran, Iran
- Cause of death: Execution by hanging
- Burial place: Khavaran cemetery, Tehran
- Military career
- Allegiance: Jundallah (Soldiers of God)
- Service years: 1998–2010
- Rank: Commander-in-chief
- Conflicts: 2005 Attack on Iranian President; 2007 Tasooki Attack; 2007 Zahedan bombing Chah Bahar kidnappings Saravan bombing Saravan ambush 2009 Pishin bombing

Abdolmalek Rigi (Note: /ˌɑːbdəlmɑːˈlɛk ˈriːɡi/ AHB-dəl-mah-LEK REE-ghee; also spelt Abdul-Malek Rigi or Abdulmalik Rigi; Balochi: عبدالمالک ریگی) (c. 1979 – 20 June 2010) was an Iranian Baloch militant who was the leader of Jundallah, a Sunni Islamist militant group based in the Sistan and Balochistan province in southeastern Iran.

In 2010, he was captured and executed by the Iranian government.

== Early life and education ==
Born in 1979, Abdolmalek Rigi was from the Rigi tribe who are ethnic Baloch. Prior to founding Jundallah, while a teenager, Rigi was convicted of assault with a knife, for which he served time in prison.

== Alleged activities ==
Starting in 2007, there has been considerable controversy over their support and international ties. Jundallah is believed by a number of experts to be linked to Al-Qaeda. There are also claims that Jundallah has had contact with the U.S. government and receives funding from Baluchi Iranians abroad.

Dan Rather's U.S. cable channel HDnet's television news magazine Dan Rather Reports, interviewed Rigi and showed a video of Rigi personally cutting off his brother in-law's head. In the same interview, Rigi described himself as "an Iranian" and denied that his goal was to form a separate Baluch state. He claimed that his goal was to "improve conditions for ethnic Baluchis", and that his group was "fighting exclusively for the rights of Sunni Muslims in Iran".

According to a former hostage, Rigi never slept in one place for two consecutive nights and did not shake hands with other people without wearing gloves. He was also reported to emulate Al-Zarqawi in his conduct and videos of hostage executions. The Iranian newspaper Kayhan incorrectly reported on 7 April 2005 that Rigi had been killed in an operation on the border to Afghanistan. A video surfaced on 11 April 2005, showing Rigi alive. Rigi's brother Abdolhamid Rigi accused his brother of working with Americans against Iran. Iranian authorities claimed that Rigi had murdered an Iranian general and carried out terrorist attacks in Iran. These allegations led to his arrest in February 2010.

== 2010 arrest ==
There are two conflicting versions of Rigi's arrest. According to the Iranian government, on 23 February 2010, Rigi was aboard a flight from Dubai, United Arab Emirates to Bishkek, Kyrgyzstan, travelling with a forged Afghanistan passport. When the plane was crossing the Persian Gulf, Iranian fighter jets intercepted it. The Iranian jets ordered the pilot to land in Iranian territory and "a number of foreign passengers were forcibly removed." When the plane landed at Bandar Abbas International Airport, Iranian forces identified Rigi and arrested him. After his arrest, Iranian TV showed Rigi, with hands tied, being escorted by four masked Iranian commandos.

According to a former U.S. intelligence officer, on the other hand, Rigi was captured by Pakistani officials and delivered to Iran with U.S. support: "It doesn't matter what they say. They know the truth."

== Execution ==
On 20 June 2010, Iranian and international media reported that Rigi had been hanged in Evin Prison in Tehran. The Islamic Republic News Agency stated that the execution was carried out following a decision of the Tehran revolutionary tribunal. It quoted a court statement saying: "The head of the armed counter-revolutionary group in the east of the country was responsible for armed robbery, assassination attempts, armed attacks on the army and police and on ordinary people, and murder." His execution was described as a "severe blow" to Jundullah.

Rigi was buried in Khavaran cemetery in southeast Tehran.

An Iranian drama film, When the Moon Was Full, written and directed by Narges Abyar, was released in 2019. It is based on the story of Rigi's brother and sister-in-law.

== See also ==
- 2009 Zahedan explosion
- 2010 Zahedan mosque bombings
