= 2007 Zahedan bombings =

Terrorist attack in Sistan-Baluchestan province, Iran

2007 Zahedan bombing
- Location: Zahedan, Iran
- Date: 14 February 2007; 6:30am (UTC+3.30)
- Attack type: Car bombing (first attack); School bombing (second attack)
- Deaths: 18 (car bombing)
- Injuries: 31 (car bombing) 1 (school bombing)
- Perpetrator: Jundallah (responsibility claimed)

The 2007 Zahedan bombings occurred from 14–17 February in Zahedan, Sistan-Baluchestan Province, Iran. The first bombing occurred at 6:30 a.m. on February 14 when a car filled with explosives stopped in front of a bus carrying Revolutionary Guards in Ahmadabad district. The car exploded, killing 18 and injuring 31 members of the Islamic Revolutionary Guard Corps. Jundallah claimed responsibility.

== First bombing ==
A car filled with explosives stopped in front of a bus full of Revolutionary Guards in Ahmadabad district, Zahedan, Sistan-Baluchestan Province at 6:30 a.m. on 14 February 2007. The car, parked in the middle of the road, forced the bus to stop. The car's driver and passengers then got out of the car and used motorbikes to leave the scene while they shot at the bus. A few seconds later the bombs exploded, killing 18 Guards. A number of Zahedan residents demonstrated in the streets, holding the coffins of the victims of the first bombing, chanting "death to hypocrites." Guards commander Qasem Rezaei said, "This blind terrorist operation led to the martyrdom of 18 citizens of Zahedan." Rezaei attributed the attack to "insurgents and elements of insecurity." Majid Razavi, an Interior Ministry official, said Iranian police arrested a suspect within an hour of the bombing. Five days later, the authorities announced the execution of Nasrollah Shanbezehi. He was hanged in public at the site of the bombing. He was said to have been tried and sentenced by a branch of the Revolutionary Court after his televised confession. In one of the pictures of his execution, where the noose is being placed around his neck, a bruise is clearly visible above his right eye. In his confession, he reportedly said that he had joined PRMI\Jundallah three months previously, solely for financial reward, but other sources say that he was arrested because he was taking a picture of the bus with his mobile phone.

Jundallah claimed responsibility for the attack on 15 February. The Iranian government has arrested five suspects, two of whom were carrying camcorders and grenades when they were arrested, while the police killed the main "agent" of the attack. Among the arrestees was Said Qanbarzehi, a Balochi, who was hanged in Zahedan prison on 27 May 2007. He had been sentenced to death at the age of 17 along with six other Balochi men—Javad Naroui, Masoud Nosratzehi, Houshang Shahnavazi, Yahya Sohrabzehi, Ali Reza Brahoui and Abdalbek Kahrazehi (also known as Abdalmalek) – in March 2007, despite the absolute international prohibition on the execution of child offenders. Balochi sources suggest that the seven may have been arrested because of their family ties to those suspected of involvement in the February bus bombing. According to Sistan-Baluchistan Provincial Television, 15–17 March 2007, Said Qanbarzehi and the six others all confessed to a number of crimes that allegedly took place in Sistan-Baluchistan province. Some reports suggest that those who confessed were tortured, including by having bones in their hands and feet broken, by being branded with a red-hot iron, and by having an electric drill applied to their limbs, shredding their muscles.

Following publication of an interview in ‘Ayyaran newspaper, which has since been closed down on the order of Hojjatoleslam Nekunam, on 17 March 2007 Hossein Ali Shahriari (Zahedan's representative in parliament), stated that there were around 700 people awaiting execution in Sistan-Baluchistan province, whose sentences had been confirmed by the Supreme Court.

=== Reaction ===
Brigadier General Mohammad Jaffari said on 15 February that the government had arrested 68 people in connection with the bombing. The spokesman for Javier Solana, the Secretary-General of the Council of the European Union, said, "We condemn the car bomb attack on Wednesday in Zahedan. Acts of terrorism can never be justified. The perpetrators must be brought to justice. We extend our condolences to the loved ones of the victims and to the Iranian government." The United Nations Security Council condemned the bombing through a press statement, saying that nothing justifies terrorism. Peter Burian, Slovakia's ambassador to the United Nations and President of the Security Council, said, "They underlined the need to bring to justice the perpetrators, organizers and sponsors of this terrorist attack, as with all terrorist attacks." United Nations Secretary-General Ban Ki-moon condemned the attack and gave his condolences to the Iranian government and the families of the victims. The Georgian Foreign Ministry also condemned the bombing.

== Second bombing ==
Jundallah militants set off a percussion bomb in a girls school on 17 February shortly after the funeral for those killed in the first bombing. Hasan Ali Nouri, governor of Zahedan, said the bomb was a "sound bomb explosion." It wounded one person. Militants then shot at an electricity plant, successfully cutting off power, before fleeing to a house in Zahedan.

Fars news agency, which is an Iranian state run agency, reported "The insurgents began shooting at people after the explosion. Clashes are continuing between police and the armed insurgents. Police have cordoned off the area."

The Iranian government summoned Pakistani ambassador Shafkat Saeed. Foreign ministry spokesman Mohammad Ali Hosseini said, "The Pakistani ambassador was summoned to the foreign ministry to give explanations. Discussions were undertaken and a committee was formed between the two countries to reinforce border security." The investigation and the confessions show that foreigners are implicated in these actions.

== See also ==
- Abdolmalek Rigi
- Iran–Pakistan barrier
- 2008 Shiraz bombing
- Attack of Tasooki
