= Zahedan =

City in Sistan and Baluchestan province, Iran

Zahedan زاهدان
- City
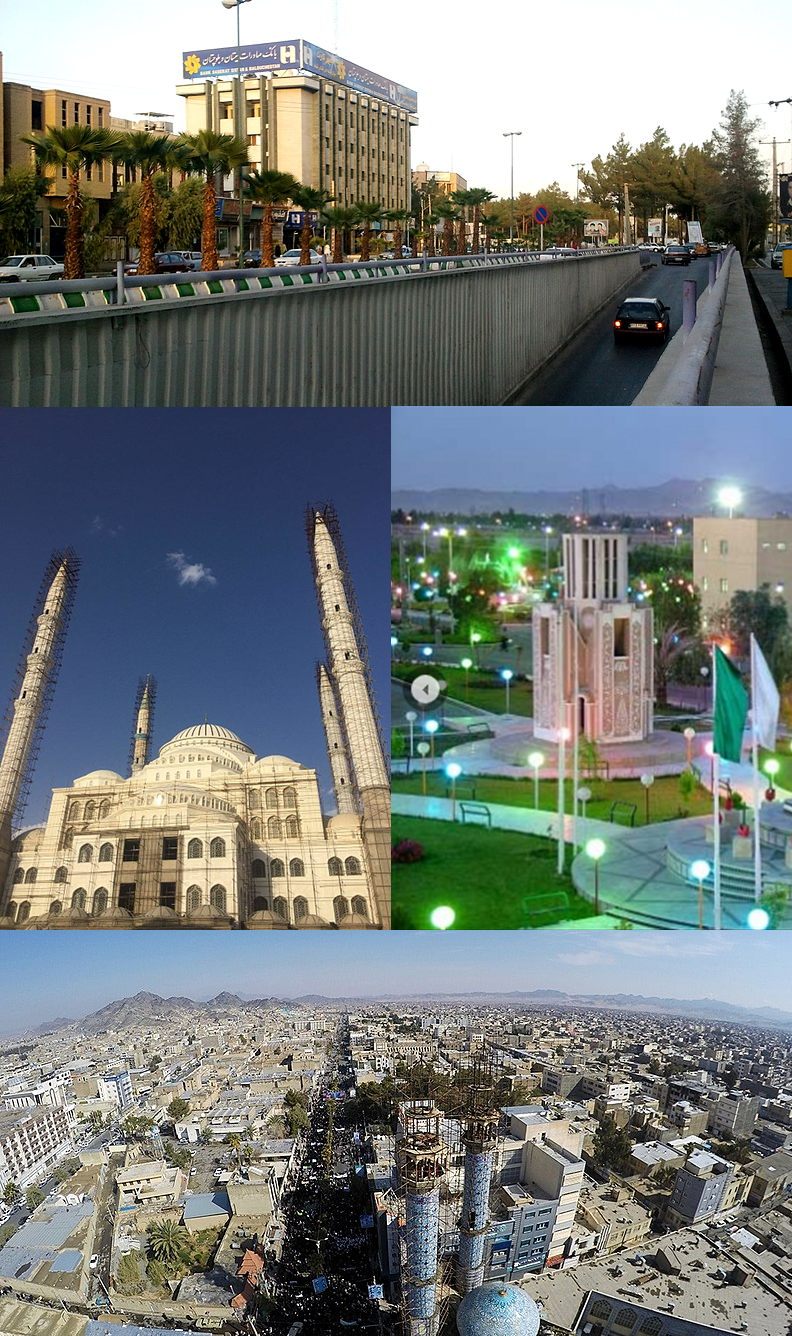
- Photomontage of Zahedan

- Seal

- Location within Iran
- Coordinates: 29°30′09″N 60°51′21″E
- Country: Iran
- Province: Sistan and Baluchestan
- County: Zahedan
- District: Central

Government
  - Mayor: Mohammad Amir Barahuyi
- Elevation: 1,352 m (4,436 ft)

Population (2016)
  - Urban: 587,730
- Time zone: UTC+3:30 (IRST)
- Area code: +98-54
- Climate: BWh
- Website: zahedan.ir

Zahedan (Balochi and Persian: زاهدان; [zɒːheˈd̪ɒːn]) (Note: Also romanized as Zâhedân and Zaahedaan; also known as Zâhedâne Yek and Zāhidān; formerly known as Dowzdâb (دوزداب), Dozdâb (دزداب), or Dozdâp (دزداپ), and renamed Zâhedân by Reza Shah Pahlavi during the late 1920s) is a city in the Central District of Zahedan County, Sistan and Baluchestan province, Iran, serving as capital of the province, the county, and the district. It is near the borderlands between Iran and Pakistan in an area inhabited by Baloch people.

== Etymology ==
The earlier name of the city was Duzzap (Persian: Duzdab, literally 'water stolen'), which it had received due to the abrupt floods into the valley. The name was later changed to Zahedan during Reza Shah's visit in 1929. As per a tradition, Reza Shah misinterpreted the traditional attire of the Sikh inhabitants of the town for ascetics (zahed), hence the renaming, who had a significant presence in the town since the extension of North Western State Railway from Nushki to Duzdab in 1919, after the brief British Indian takeover during World War I.

== History ==
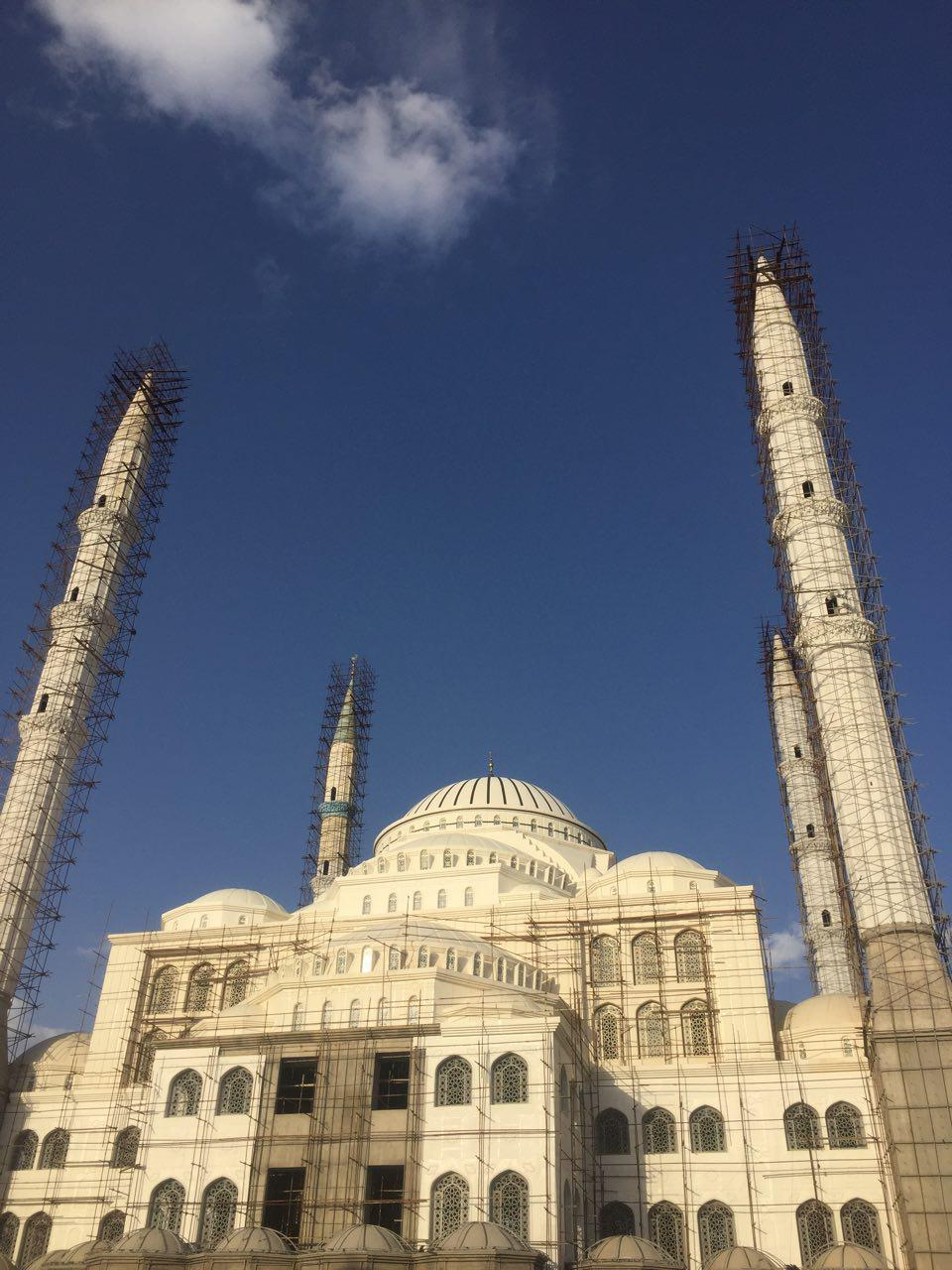
Makki Mosque

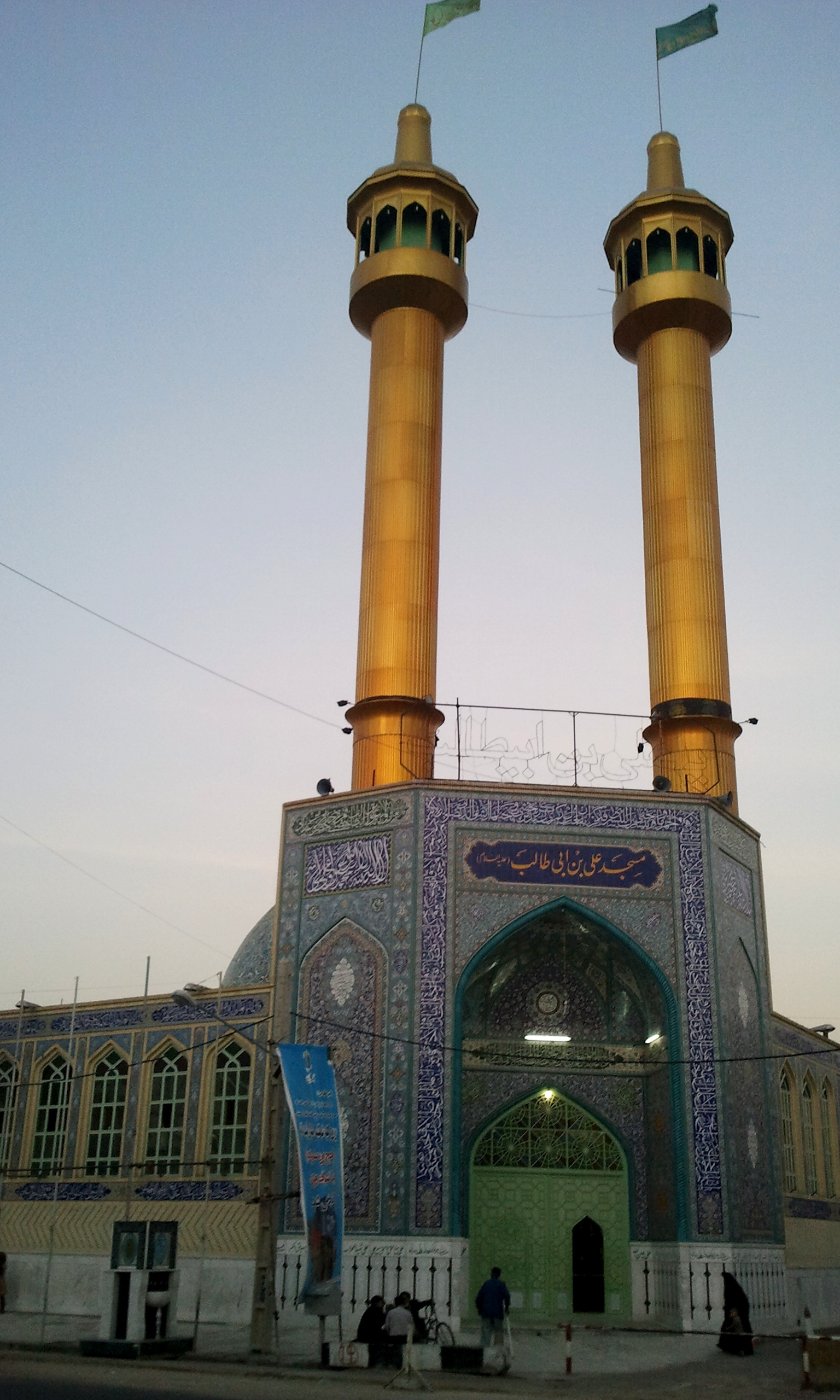
Ali Ibn Abi Talib Mosque

Mention of Zahedan first appears in sources in August 1849. However, the city first truly started to grow during the early 20th century. It was a small oasis town until the beginning of 20th century. In the early years after World War I, the town had a population of 5,000, of which 3,000 came from the British Indian Empire. During World War I it became the westernmost terminal (Zahedan railway station) of North Western State Railway, which reached as far as Quetta in the northern part of what was then British Baluchistan. By the time of 1941 Anglo-Soviet invasion of Iran, it had become the second largest city in eastern Iran after Mashhad, largely owing to the British imperial interests. The town also became a centre of activities of Sikh traders; they built a gurdwara and opened a school which taught in Punjabi. Most of them had come from Jhelum District.

The city was the site of a deadly crackdown in October 2022, with dozens citizens killed by pro-governmental forces. Over 90 people were killed. Two senior police officials were fired in the aftermath of the crackdown. On 28 October, there were protests in Zahedan and security forces fired on protestors, killing 98 and injuring 14.

On 3 November 2022, the Shi'i cleric and Khamenei loyalist Sajjad Shahraki was assassinated in Zahedan. The next day, there were widespread protests in the city; Revolutionary Guards and other armed forces opened fire on protestors.

== Demographics ==
=== Population ===
While the surrounding area boasts numerous ancient sites, Zahedan itself primarily developed in the 20th century. It transitioned from a small village to the provincial administrative center in the 1930s. Its population reached 17,500 by 1956, and increased more than fivefold to 93,000 by 1976. After 1980, large numbers of refugees fleeing the Soviet invasion of Afghanistan helped triple the population of Zahedan to more than 281,000 by 1986, a number which has since doubled again.

At the time of the 2006 National Census, the city's population was 552,706 in 109,488 households. The following census in 2011 counted 560,725 people in 134,088 households. The 2016 census measured the population of the city as 587,730 people in 146,717 households.

== Geography ==
=== Location ===
Zahedan is connected by rail to nearby Pakistan and is near to Afghanistan. It is about 41 km (25 mi) south of the tripoint of the three countries and at an altitude of 1,352 m (4,436 ft) above sea level and 1,605 km (997 mi) from the Iranian capital of Tehran.

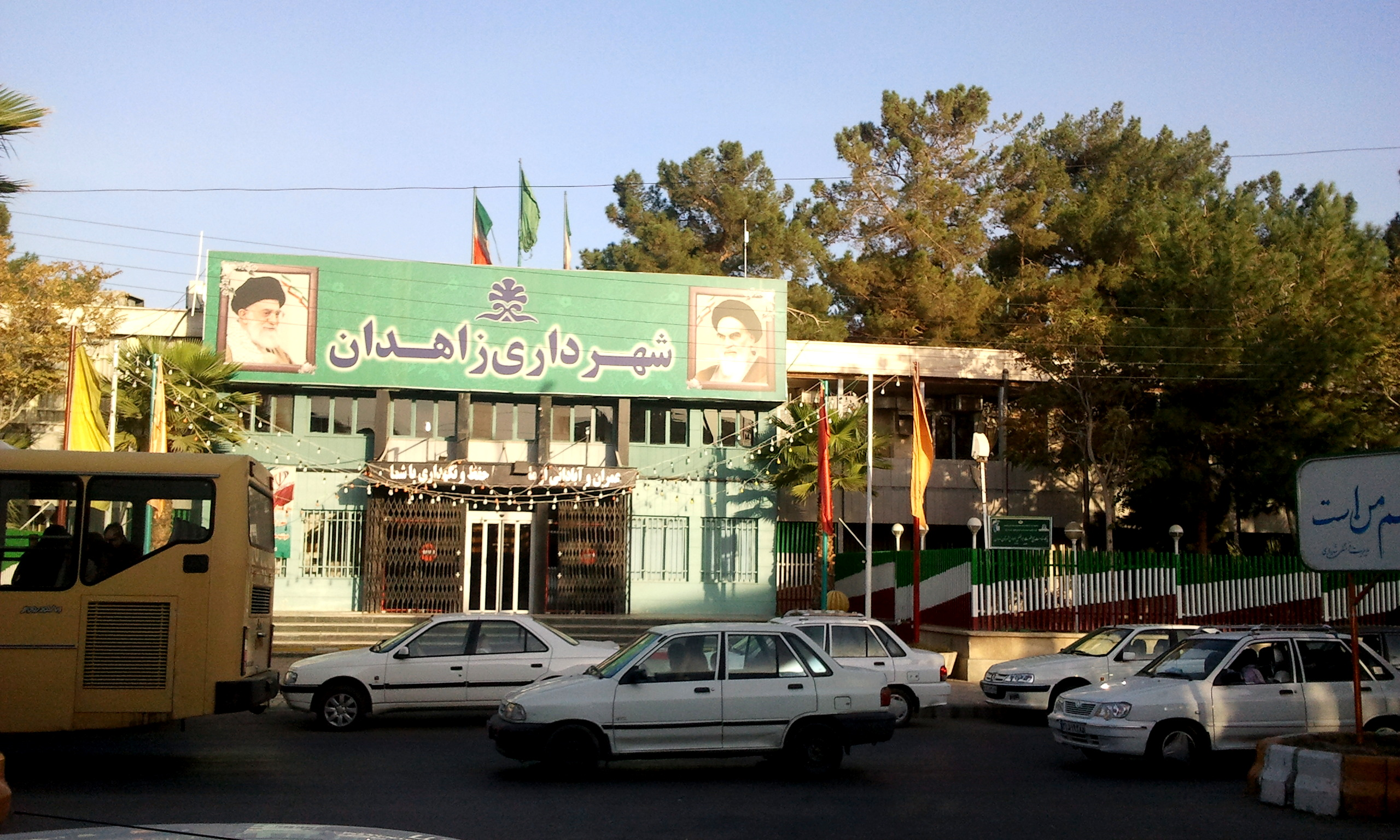
Zahedan Municipality

=== Climate ===
Zahedan has a hot arid climate (Köppen: BWh, Trewartha: BWhk). Precipitation is very low, and mostly falls in winter.

Zahedan experiences very hot summers: there are 84.7 afternoons per year with maximum temperature above 35 °C (95 °F), of which 7 have a daily maximum above 40 °C (104 °F). Winters feature pleasant afternoons but chilly mornings, with minimum temperatures below 0 °C (32 °F) for 43.7 days annually. Zahedan also experiences 81.3 days a year with haze.

Climate data for Zahedan (1991–2020, extremes 1961–present)
Month	Jan	Feb	Mar	Apr	May	Jun	Jul	Aug	Sep	Oct	Nov	Dec	Year
Record high °C (°F)	27.0 (80.6)	29.8 (85.6)	34.5 (94.1)	37.4 (99.3)	41.0 (105.8)	43.4 (110.1)	43.0 (109.4)	43.2 (109.8)	41.0 (105.8)	36.4 (97.5)	32.6 (90.7)	28.6 (83.5)	43.4 (110.1)
Mean daily maximum °C (°F)	14.8 (58.6)	17.7 (63.9)	22.4 (72.3)	28.4 (83.1)	33.1 (91.6)	36.4 (97.5)	37.4 (99.3)	36.0 (96.8)	32.9 (91.2)	28.2 (82.8)	21.9 (71.4)	17.1 (62.8)	27.2 (80.9)
Daily mean °C (°F)	7.5 (45.5)	10.5 (50.9)	15.3 (59.5)	21.1 (70.0)	25.9 (78.6)	29.2 (84.6)	30.3 (86.5)	28.2 (82.8)	24.0 (75.2)	18.9 (66.0)	13.0 (55.4)	8.6 (47.5)	19.4 (66.9)
Mean daily minimum °C (°F)	0.8 (33.4)	3.7 (38.7)	8.4 (47.1)	13.2 (55.8)	17.5 (63.5)	19.9 (67.8)	20.8 (69.4)	18.1 (64.6)	13.7 (56.7)	9.6 (49.3)	4.9 (40.8)	1.0 (33.8)	11.0 (51.7)
Record low °C (°F)	−22.0 (−7.6)	−14.0 (6.8)	−7.0 (19.4)	−1.0 (30.2)	1.4 (34.5)	10.8 (51.4)	12.0 (53.6)	8.0 (46.4)	2.0 (35.6)	−4.0 (24.8)	−11.0 (12.2)	−16.0 (3.2)	−22.0 (−7.6)
Average precipitation mm (inches)	16.5 (0.65)	12.4 (0.49)	13.9 (0.55)	8.6 (0.34)	3.6 (0.14)	1.2 (0.05)	1.0 (0.04)	0.2 (0.01)	0.1 (0.00)	4.0 (0.16)	3.9 (0.15)	12.5 (0.49)	77.9 (3.07)
Average precipitation days (≥ 1.0 mm)	2.7	2.1	2.5	1.8	1	0.2	0.1	0	0.1	0.5	0.8	1.3	13.1
Average snowy days	0.7	0.4	0.1	0	0	0	0	0	0	0	0	0.3	1.5
Average relative humidity (%)	48	43	37	28	21	16	16	16	17	25	35	42	29
Average dew point °C (°F)	−4.6 (23.7)	−3.5 (25.7)	−2.0 (28.4)	−0.4 (31.3)	0.2 (32.4)	−0.4 (31.3)	0.8 (33.4)	−1.3 (29.7)	−3.9 (25.0)	−3.5 (25.7)	−4.1 (24.6)	−5.7 (21.7)	−2.4 (27.7)
Mean monthly sunshine hours	231	221	240	267	307	329	344	342	316	298	262	229	3,386
Mean daily daylight hours	10.5	11.2	12	12.9	13.6	14	13.8	13.2	12.3	11.5	10.7	10.3	12.2
Average ultraviolet index	4	6	9	11	12	12	12	12	10	8	5	4	9
Source 1: NOAA NCEI (1961–1990 extremes)
Source 2: Weather Atlas

Climate data for Zahedan (1955–2010)
Month	Jan	Feb	Mar	Apr	May	Jun	Jul	Aug	Sep	Oct	Nov	Dec	Year
Record high °C (°F)	27.0 (80.6)	29.8 (85.6)	34.0 (93.2)	38.0 (100.4)	41.0 (105.8)	43.0 (109.4)	43.0 (109.4)	43.0 (109.4)	41.0 (105.8)	38.0 (100.4)	31.0 (87.8)	28.0 (82.4)	43.0 (109.4)
Mean daily maximum °C (°F)	14.3 (57.7)	17.0 (62.6)	21.9 (71.4)	27.7 (81.9)	32.5 (90.5)	36.2 (97.2)	37.0 (98.6)	35.8 (96.4)	32.5 (90.5)	27.8 (82.0)	21.8 (71.2)	16.7 (62.1)	26.8 (80.2)
Daily mean °C (°F)	7.2 (45.0)	10.2 (50.4)	15.0 (59.0)	20.1 (68.2)	24.5 (76.1)	27.5 (81.5)	28.6 (83.5)	26.6 (79.9)	22.7 (72.9)	18.2 (64.8)	12.8 (55.0)	8.8 (47.8)	18.5 (65.3)
Mean daily minimum °C (°F)	0.2 (32.4)	3.1 (37.6)	7.9 (46.2)	12.4 (54.3)	16.3 (61.3)	18.9 (66.0)	20.0 (68.0)	17.5 (63.5)	12.9 (55.2)	8.5 (47.3)	3.8 (38.8)	1.0 (33.8)	10.2 (50.4)
Record low °C (°F)	−22 (−8)	−14 (7)	−7 (19)	−1 (30)	1.4 (34.5)	10.8 (51.4)	11.0 (51.8)	8.0 (46.4)	2.0 (35.6)	−4 (25)	−11 (12)	−16 (3)	−22 (−8)
Average precipitation mm (inches)	21.1 (0.83)	17.3 (0.68)	15.7 (0.62)	10.6 (0.42)	4.5 (0.18)	0.8 (0.03)	1.3 (0.05)	0.5 (0.02)	0.1 (0.00)	2.2 (0.09)	4.0 (0.16)	11.2 (0.44)	89.3 (3.52)
Average rainy days	5.0	4.3	5.0	4.0	2.6	0.5	0.5	0.1	0.2	1.0	1.5	2.7	27.4
Average snowy days	0.6	0.3	0.1	0	0	0	0	0	0	0	0	0.3	1.3
Average relative humidity (%)	54	47	40	32	26	21	21	21	22	29	38	48	33
Mean monthly sunshine hours	215.1	209.2	224.9	251.6	304.5	316.8	330.7	333.8	308.1	294.0	252.9	217.3	3,258.9
Source: NOAA (1961–1990)

== Economy ==
Zahedan is the main economic center of the region and home to many small- and medium-scale industries. Its main products include cotton textiles, woven and hand-knotted rugs, ceramics, processed foods, livestock feed, processed hides, milled rice, brick, reed mats and baskets.

Zahedan also serves as a significant regional trade hub due to its proximity to the borders of Pakistan and Afghanistan. The Taftan border crossing, located east of Zahedan, is the main artery connecting Iran with Pakistan's Balochistan province, facilitating the movement of goods and people and playing a key role in regional commerce. Strategically located along routes linking Central Asia and Persian Gulf ports to the south, the city has benefited from regional trade. Despite its strategic location, the region remains among the least economically developed in Iran, facing challenges related to underdevelopment and regional inequality.

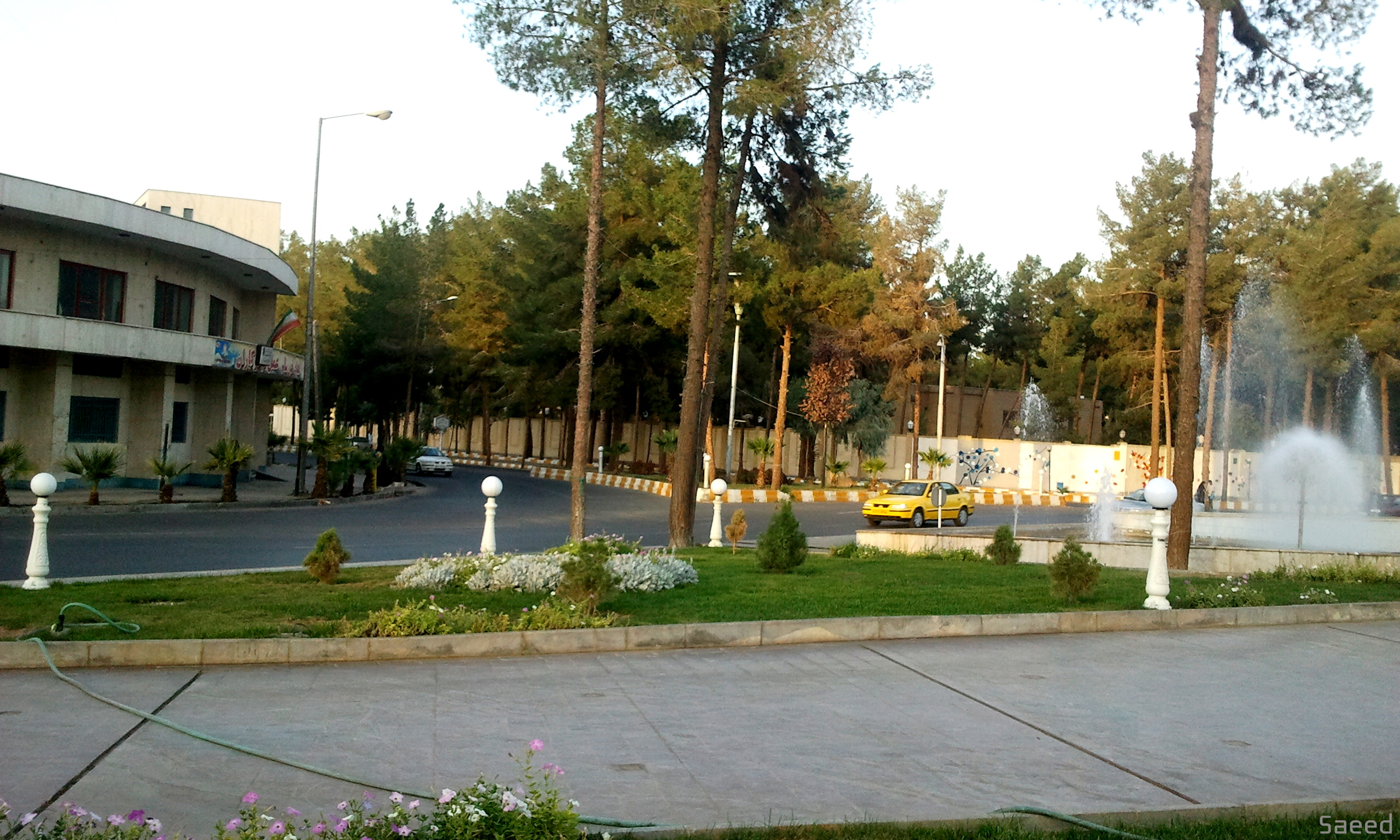
Street view, Zahedan

== Transport ==
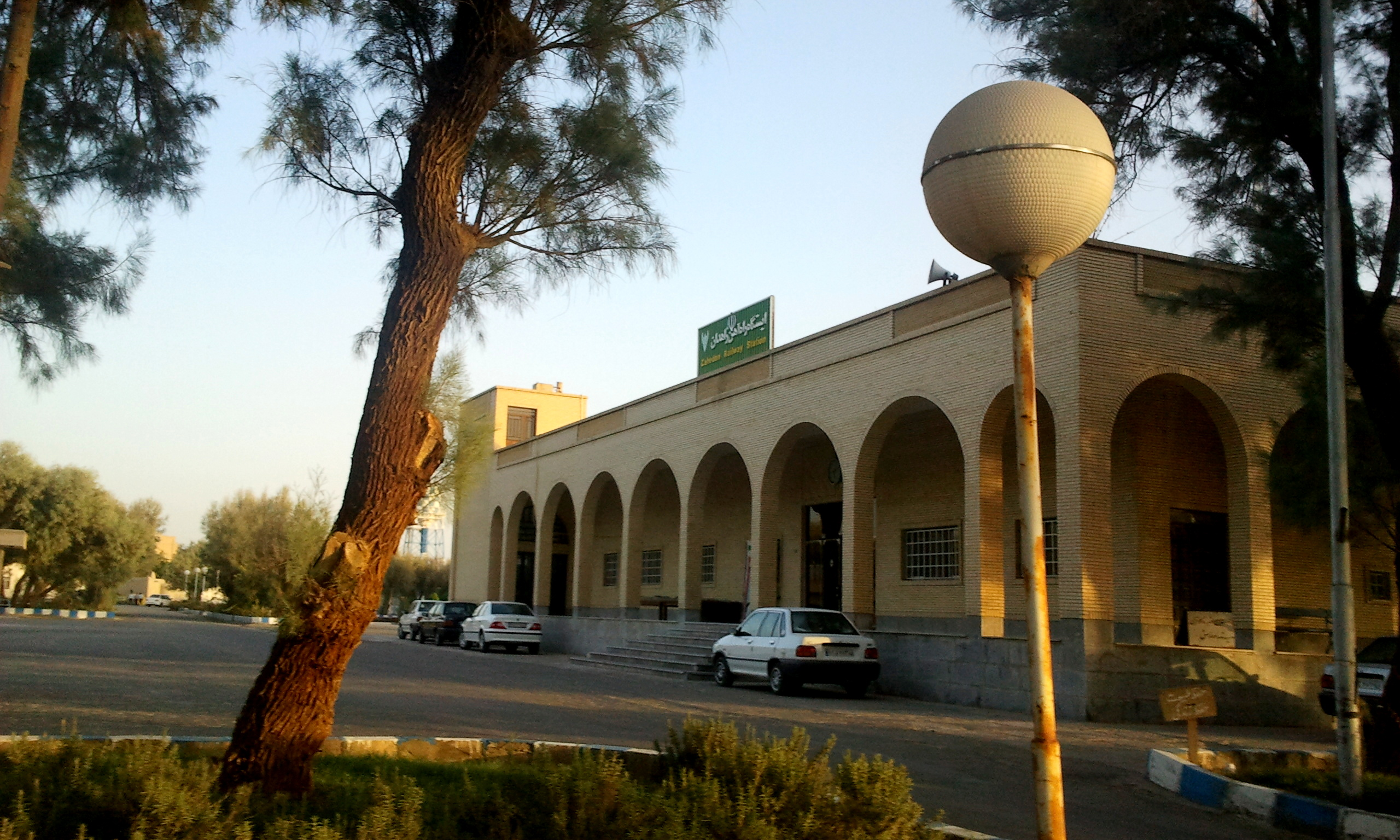
Zahedan railway station

Zahedan is served by Zahedan International Airport.

Highway 95 links Zahedan to Tehran and Mashhad in the north and the port of Bandar Chabahar on the Sea of Oman in the south, and Highway 84 to the Pakistani city of Quetta in the east and to Kerman in the west.

For decades the 5 ft 6 in (1,676 mm) broad gauge (Indian subcontinent system) railway exists from Zahedan station to/from Quetta's station in Pakistan, the Quetta–Taftan Railway Line. Beyond this, west, a standard gauge line was completed from Zahedan to Kerman linking the city with the rest of the Iranian rail network. This flowed from a 18 May 2007 MOU for rail co-operation (of Pakistan and Iran) under which the line was to be completed by December 2008. It was completed with an opening ceremony on 19 June 2009. This means that Zahedan hosts the break of gauge between the Islamic Republic of Iran Railway's standard gauge tracks of the Trans-Iranian Railway and Pakistan Railway's broad gauge aforementioned.

=== Chabahar–Zahedan railway ===
Iran railway network in 2020, Zahedan–Bam–Mirjaveh railway is complete and operational

In May 2016, during Indian Prime Minister Narendra Modi's trip to Iran, agreement was signed to develop two terminals and five berths at Port of Chabahar and to build a new railway between Chabahar and Zahedan, as part of North–South Transport Corridor, by Indian Railways's public sector unit Ircon International. Ten years later, this proposal is still under study and consideration, a via Kerman connection to the port of Chabahar.

In July 2016, India began shipping US$150 million of tracks to Chabahar to build the US$1.6 billion line, for which India pledged additional US$400 million and Iran has also allocated US$125 million in December 2016, thus taking the total allocation to US$575 million (out of US$1.6 billion needed) by the end of 2016.

== Sports ==
In April 2008 the 70 billion IRR (about 2.5 million USD) Zahedan Stadium was built with a seating capacity of 15,000 people. It was inaugurated on 18 April 2008 with a friendly football game between Honarmandan (Artists) and a local team.

== Education ==
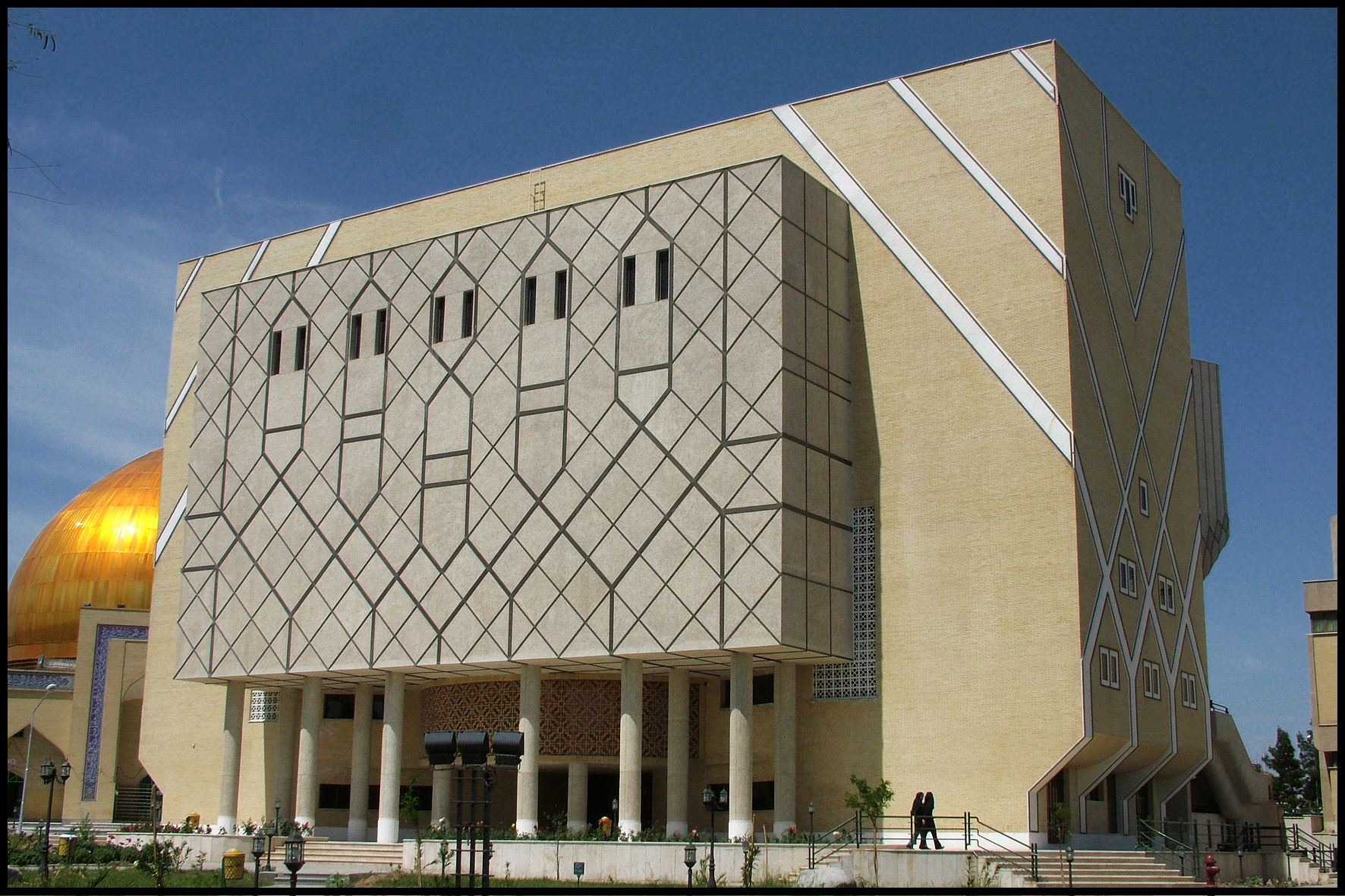
University of Sistan and Baluchestan's Amphitheater in Zahedan.

Zahedan is the home of the Islamic Azad University of Zahedan, the Zahedan University of Medical Sciences and the University of Sistan and Baluchestan. Besides, the largest Sunni seminary, Darululoom Zahedan, is located in Zahedan. There are some other religious Sunni schools in the city and the vicinity.

== Notable people ==
- Mohammad Jorjandi, cybercrime expert

== See also ==
- 2022 Zahedan massacre
- 2007 Zahedan bombings
- 2009 Zahedan bombings
- July 2010 Zahedan bombings
- 2019 Khash–Zahedan suicide bombing
- Zahedan travel guide from Wikivoyage

== Sources ==
- Bosworth, C.E. (2002). "Zāhidān". In Bearman, P. J.; Bianquis, Th.; Bosworth, C. E.; van Donzel, E. & Heinrichs, W. P. (eds.). The Encyclopaedia of Islam, Second Edition. Volume XI: W–Z. Leiden: E. J. Brill. p. 387. ISBN 978-90-04-12756-2.
- Dudoignon, Stéphane A. (2017). The Baluch, Sunnism and the State in Iran: From Tribal to Global. Oxford University Press. ISBN 978-0-19-065591-4.
