= 2023 Afghanistan–Iran clash =

Cross-border armed clashes

- Part of the spillover of the Afghan conflict
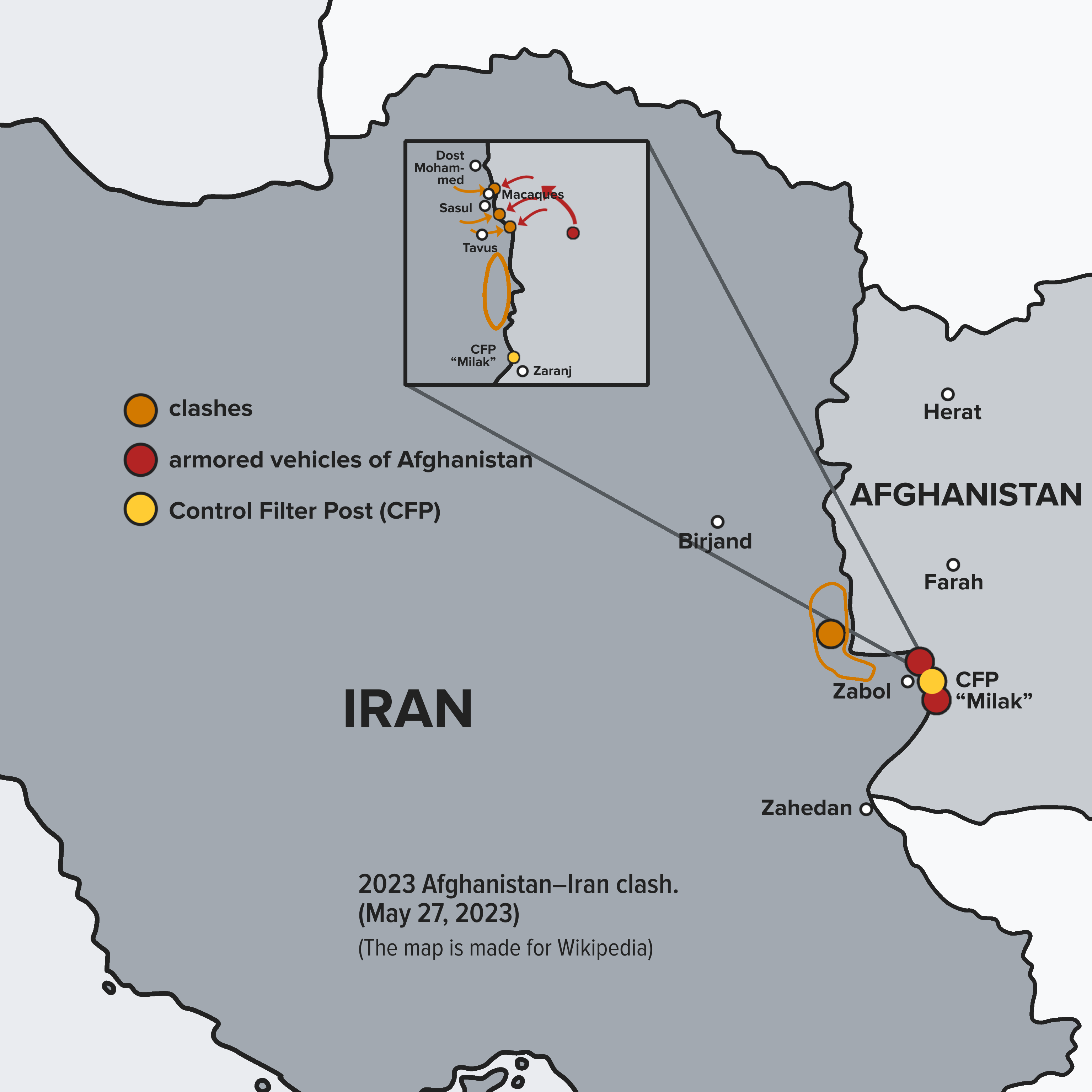
- Location of the fighting
Date	27 May 2023
Location	Afghanistan–Iran border
Result	status quo ante bellum: Border crossings reopened

Belligerents
Afghanistan	Iran

Units involved
Afghan Armed Forces; Islamic National Army	Police Command; Border Guard Command

Casualties and losses
1 killed Several killed (Iranian claim)	1 killed (Afghan claim); 1 killed, 2 injured (Iranian claim)

On 27 May 2023, the Armed Forces of the Islamic Emirate of Afghanistan and Iranian border guards clashed along the Afghanistan–Iran border between the Afghan Nimruz Province and the Iranian Sistan and Baluchestan province. After a brief clash, the two sides de-escalated the situation.

== Background ==
=== Iran's rights to the Helmand water ===
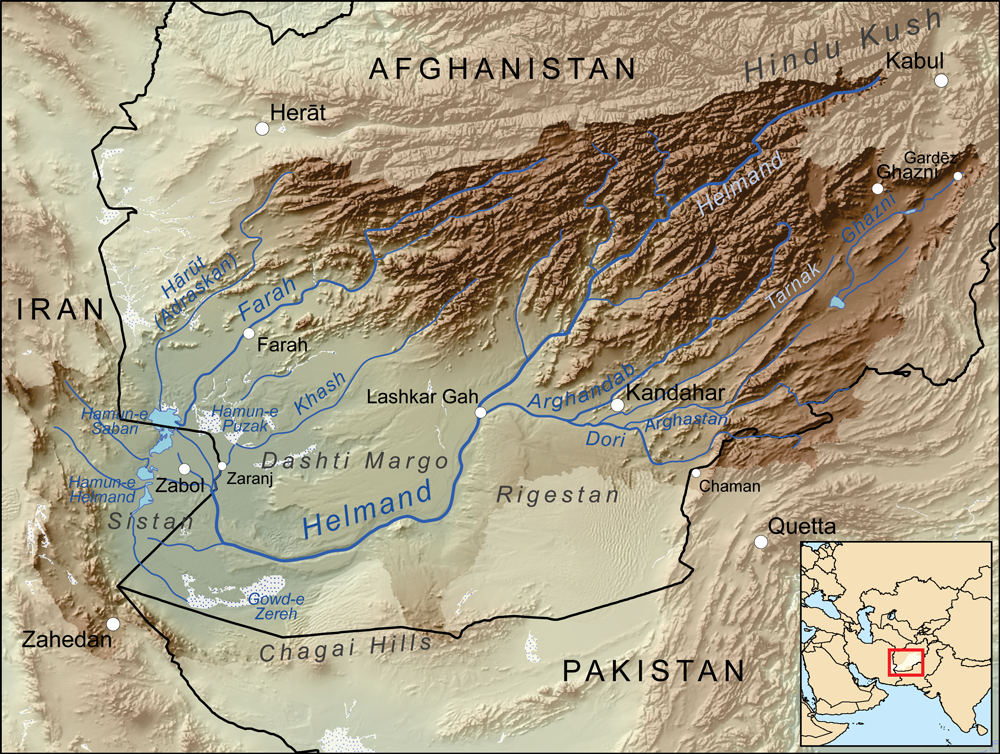
Map showing the Helmand River drainage basin

Iran and Afghanistan have been fighting over water rights in the Helmand River since the 1870s. Disputes flared up again after the river changed course in 1896. In 1939, the two countries signed an accord to share water rights, but it was never ratified. According to a 1973 treaty, Iran was supposed to receive a share of 820 million cubic meters of the river each year. In 1979, when relations between the Democratic Republic of Afghanistan and the newly formed Islamic Republic of Iran soured, Hafizullah Amin announced that the DRA was not bound by old treaties with Iran. Amin's statements provoked a sharp response from Iran which claimed Afghanistan was using Soviet backing to assert themselves in the region. During Ashraf Ghani's presidency, Afghanistan began building a number of new dams, such as the Salma Dam across the Harirud river and the Kamal Khan Dam across the Helmand river. According to historian Mustafa Hamid, the Kamal Khan dam was designed to complicate relations between Iran and Afghanistan, and did not benefit Afghanistan. Water sharing arrangements with Iran have been ongoing since the Taliban came to power.

On 18 May 2023, Iranian president Ebrahim Raisi warned the Taliban not to violate Iran's water rights, urging them to implement the 1973 treaty.

=== Iran–Taliban relations ===
Relations between Iran, a primarily Shiite country, and the Taliban, dominated by Sunni fundamentalists, have historically been highly volatile. During the Taliban's rule of Afghanistan between 1996 and 2001, 10 Iranian diplomats and an Iranian journalist from the consulate in Mazar-i-Sharif were executed, in an incident condemned by the Taliban. This led to a military mobilization by Iran, which was resolved with the mediation of the United Nations. During the 2001 U.S. Invasion of Afghanistan, Iran cooperated with the U.S. forces and Iranian special forces supported the Northern Alliance during the Herat uprising.

After George W. Bush's 2002 "axis of evil" speech, Iran improved its relations with the Taliban. During the war, the U.S., UK, and the Islamic Republic of Afghanistan accused Iran of providing sanctuaries and material support to the Taliban. In 2017, the Islamic Republic of Afghanistan accused Iran of aiding the Taliban in their offensive against the Afghan government forces in western Afghanistan and claimed that Iran had tried to destroy a dam in Herat province. Iran has denied all accusations of providing support to the Taliban.

In mid-2021, the Taliban, allegedly supported by Iran, reestablished its rule over Afghanistan following the U.S. withdrawal from the country. On 1 December 2021, the 2021 Afghanistan–Iran clashes occurred between the Islamic Emirate of Afghanistan and the Islamic Republic of Iran. Both sides called it an accident.

== Clashes ==
Official statement issued by both sides as to how the clashes took place differed significantly, with each side blaming the other. Inayatullah Khwarazmi, spokesperson for the Afghan Ministry of Defence, stated: "Unfortunately, today once again in the border areas of Kang district of Nimroz province, there was a shooting by Iranian soldiers, [and] a conflict ... broke out." Ghasem Rezaei, the deputy chief of Iranian law enforcement, stated: "Without observing international laws and good neighbourliness, Taliban forces started shooting at the Sasuli checkpoint ... drawing a decisive response."

According to Iran's Tasnim News Agency, the clashes began when a group of armed drug smugglers attempted to cross into Iran, and Iranian forces fired on them. Local Afghan forces, unaware of what was happening, assumed that the Iranian forces were attacking them, and a clash ensued. Afghan forces then attempted to attack the border villages of Sasuli, Hatam, and Makaki, and were repelled.

Iranian border guard forces made use of artillery during the clashes but denied claims regarding the use of missiles.

== Aftermath ==
Iran reopened the border with Afghanistan at the Abrisham bridge on 28 May, which had been closed previously due to the clashes.

The Iranian Embassy in Kabul and Afghan officials established contact afterwards to look into the incident. Iranian general Kioumars Heydari and deputy chief of Iranian law enforcement Ghasem Rezaei also held a joint meeting with Afghan officials in Zabol city, discussing how to prevent such incidents in the future. On 29 May 2023, after the end of the clashes, Iranian Interior Minister Ahmad Vahidi described the situation on the Iranian-Afghan border as follows:

"At present, we have no problem. The border crossing is open for travels and is tranquil".

Afghan officials called for diplomacy as the solution to problems, claiming that the problems at the border had been addressed, with Afghanistan's foreign ministry adding that the country has no intention of conflict with Iran. Zia-Ahmad Takal, deputy spokesman for the Ministry of Foreign Affairs, stated:

"We don’t want relations with our neighboring countries to deteriorate ... The Islamic Emirate of Afghanistan is never in favor of escalation".

Members of the Afghan prime minister's political commission also called for good relations with Iran, in response to the clashes. Additionally, Afghanistan's chargés d'affaires in Islamabad Sardar Ahmad Khan Shakib stated:

"The Afghan Taliban never wants its relations with its neighbors to be influenced, and according to the Islamic principles, we will not take any steps to violate the rights of our neighbor Iran".

== See also ==
- Afghanistan–Pakistan border skirmishes
- Afghanistan–Pakistan clashes (2024–present)
- Afghanistan–Iran relations
- Afghanistan–Iran water dispute
- 2009 Afghanistan–Iran clash
- Iran–Pakistan border skirmishes
- 2024 Iran–Pakistan conflict
- 2025 Afghanistan–Pakistan conflict
- Twelve-Day War
- 2021 Afghanistan–Iran clashes- border clash between Afghanistan and Iran
