= Afghanistan–Iran clash =

Afghanistan–Iran clash may refer to:

- 2009 Afghanistan–Iran clash
- 2021 Afghanistan–Iran clashes
- 2023 Afghanistan–Iran clash
