= Afghanistan–Iran relations =

- Afghanistan: Iran

Diplomatic mission
- Afghan Embassy, Tehran: Iranian Embassy, Kabul

Relations between Afghanistan and Iran were officially established in 1935 during Zahir Shah's reign and the Pahlavi dynasty's Reza Shah Pahlavi, though ties between the two countries have existed for millennia. As a result, many Afghans speak Persian, as Dari (an eastern dialect of Persian) is one of the official languages of Afghanistan, and many in Afghanistan also celebrate Nowruz, the Persian New Year.

Relations were negatively affected by the 1978 Saur Revolution and 1979 Iranian Revolution and issues related to the Afghan conflict (i.e. PDPA, Mujahideen, Afghan refugees, and the Taliban), as well as Iran's water dispute and the growing influence of the United States in the Islamic Republic of Afghanistan. According to Deutsche Welle in 2018, an increase in Taliban activity in the border between Iran and Afghanistan suggests a possible cooperation between the Iranian forces and the Talibans. In a 2018 report by the Reuters, Afghan forces at the time accused Iran of presenting the Taliban with arms and money, but Iran denied the accusations. In July 2019, the Iranian government passed a law that provides Afghan nationals with a new chance to get Iranian residency. Afghans with specific scientific and professional achievements and those who have Iranian spouses and children are among those who are qualified to benefit from the law. After the Taliban returned to power in 2021, despite some differences, relations between the two countries have further developed.

== Historical context ==
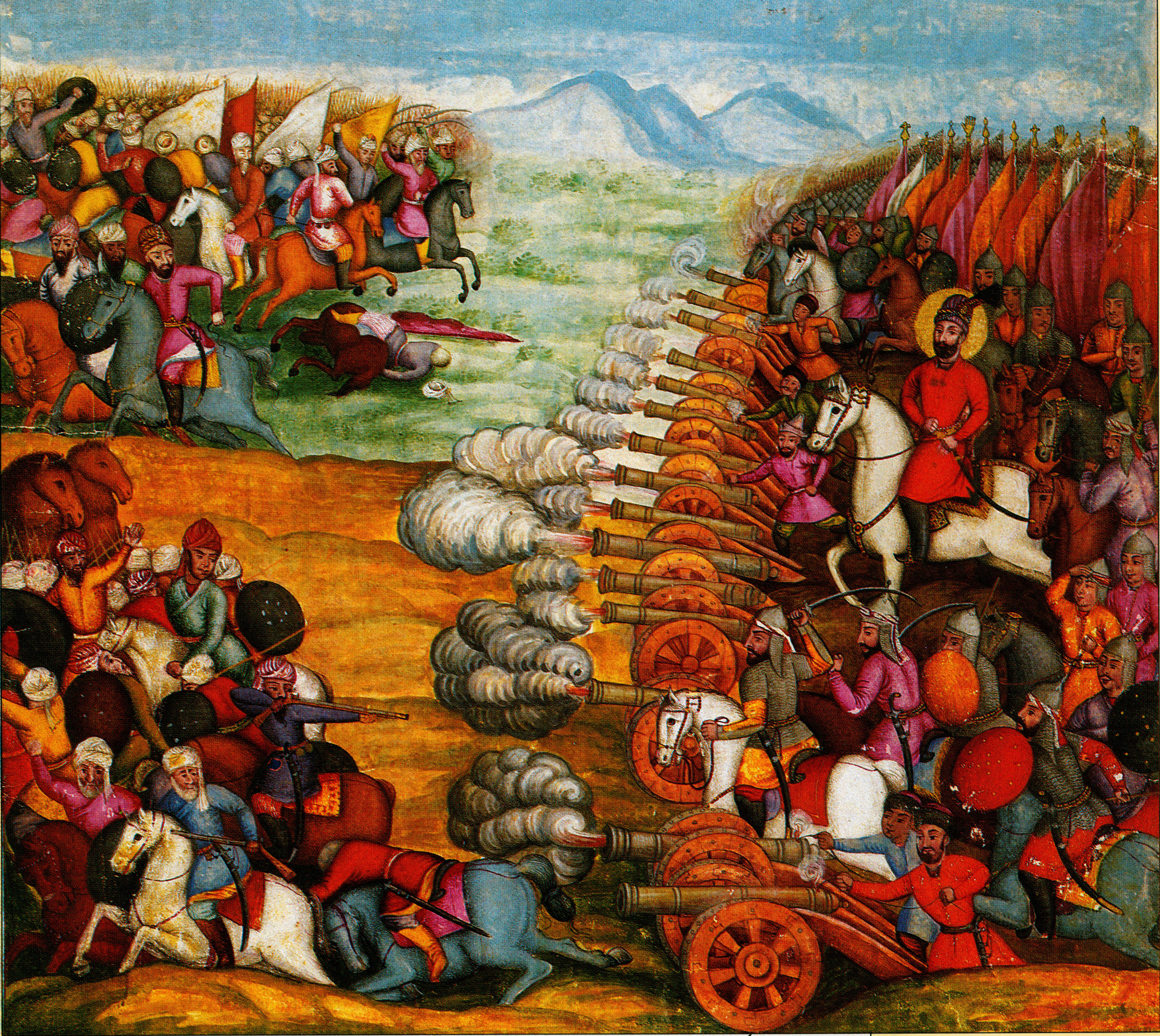
Painting of Battle of Damghan, illustrating Persian decisive artillery fire against the Afghans in 1729

Afghanistan shares a relatively long history with Iran (called Persia in the West before 1935) and it was part of many Persian Empires such as Achaemenid and Sasanian dynasties. In fact the regions which encompass the modern state of Afghanistan were considered an integral part of Iran (Persia) by the 11th century poet Firdawsi in his Shahnameh, Zabulistan was even considered the homeland of the Iranian hero Rostam.

When the Safavid dynasty was founded in Persia, part of what is now Afghanistan was ruled by the Khanate of Bukhara and Babur from Kabulistan. The first Iranian Safavid Shah Shah Ismail I quickly expanded his empire in all directions, in which he also conquered large parts of nowadays Afghanistan. For centuries they ruled the region and the Safavids did not have any problems at first ruling the easternmost territories of their empire, but their policy towards non-Shia subjects became worse and worse over time. Wars began between the Shia Safavids and the larger Sunnis, particularly in the Old Kandahar region. By the late 17th century, the Safavids were heavily declining. They had appointed their Georgian subject Gurgin Khan as governor of Kandahar in order to forcibly convert the Afghans from Sunni Islam to Shia Islam, resulting in widespread oppression and violence.

It remained this way until the rise of Mirwais Hotak, a well-respected Sunni Ghilzai Pashtun tribal chief. Mirwais succeeded in defeating the declining Safavids in a succession of battles and declared southern Afghanistan a completely independent country. His son Mahmud conquered Persia for a short time in 1722, while it was ridden by civil strife and foreign interests from the Safavids' archrivals, the Ottomans and the Russians, and soon afterward, the Safavid dynasty ended.

Despite those events, there are cultural ties between the two nations extending thousands of years. As a result, an eastern dialect of Persian, Dari is one of the official dialects of Afghanistan. Many in Afghanistan celebrate Nowruz, a pre-Islamic Iranian spring celebration celebrated in many countries and regions in the world, the main representative being Balkh a province in the north of Afghanistan.

== Contemporary era ==
Afghanistan signed a treaty of friendship with Iran in 1921, when the country was ruled by King Amanullah Khan and Iran was still under the Qajar dynasty. According to the Daily Pioneer, because of the ongoing agreement between Iran and Afghanistan, their relationship has yet to be manipulated by any third party and will remain so in the future.

In an attempt to diversify the Republic of Afghanistan’s ties with the outside world, President Daoud Khan built upon Shah Mohammed Reza Pahlavi’s increasing interest in Afghan affairs by seeking Iranian assistance to fund Afghanistan’s seven-year economic plan. Signs of Imperial Iran’s interest in Afghanistan was allegedly apparent since the 1973 Afghan coup d'état, which saw the overthrow of King Mohammad Zahir Shah and the monarchy, the republican Afghan regime raised concerns about the Soviet Union’s influence in Afghanistan, therefore Iran was encouraged by the United States to offset Soviet influence by expanding economic and political ties with Afghanistan. After the coup occurred, Mohammed Reza Pahlavi gave financial assistance to Prince Ahmad Shah Khan, who lived in exile in the U.S. state of Virginia. Iran offered a two-billion-dollar economic aid program over a ten-year period to Afghanistan. Simultaneously, Iran’s SAVAK participated in channeling covert aid to underground anti-Daoud Islamic groups to fight against Soviet influence in Afghanistan. Iran intended to block the expansion of Soviet power not only in Afghanistan, but the entire region. In the coming years, the Afghan government cracked down on pro-Soviet leftist groups such as the PDPA, and forged closer ties with Iran and other Islamic countries in the region.

=== Saur Revolution and Iranian Revolution ===
On 27 April 1978, Afghan Army units affiliated with the People's Democratic Party of Afghanistan (PDPA) launched an armed uprising against the Afghan President Daoud Khan. Two days after the assassination of Daoud Khan, the Shah of Iran told American presidential candidate George H. W. Bush that he viewed the Khalqist seizure of power as example of the Soviet Union's attempt to encircle Iran. On 22 August, the Khalqist faction of the PDPA led by Nur Muhammad Taraki and Hafizullah Amin launch a purge against the Parcham faction. Taraki blamed what he called a conspiracy involving China, the United States, Pakistan, Saudi Arabia and Iran. On 19 December 1978, Hafizullah Amin requested 20 million rubles in assistance to expand the AGSA and establish a "military intelligence network for the DRA in Iran, Pakistan, and some Arab countries". In February 1979, the Shah of Iran was overthrown as part of the Iranian Revolution which replaced the pro-Western but secularist Shah with the anti-American but theocratic Ayatollah Khomeini. Initially the PDPA-Khalq government wished to have good relations but after Khomeini issued a public condemnation of the Saur Revolution causing relations to sour immensely between the Shi'a Islamist government of Iran and the Pashtun dominated Marxist–Leninist atheist government of Afghanistan. On 15 March 1979, an uprising was launched in Herat city. In a phone call between Premier of the Soviet Union Alexei Kosygin and General Secretary of the PDPA, Nur Muhammad Taraki, Taraki claimed that 4,000 Iranian soldiers had entered Herat dressed as civilians asking the Soviets to send soldiers from the Central Asian republics in Afghan uniforms to help them counteract Iranian interference. In June 1979, a uprising was launched by the ethnic Hazara Shia minority in Chindawol, Kabul. The uprising was brutally crushed and over 2,000 participants were arrested and executed.

=== Post-1979 ===
In December 1979, the Soviet Union sent around 100,000 troops to Afghanistan to assist the PDPA government against a nationwide mujahideen insurgency. The mujahideen were made up of various groups that were trained by Pakistan, Saudi Arabia, and the United States. The "Tehran Eight", a Shi'a mujahideen coalition took control of parts of Hazarajat in 1979 in opposition to the Communist occupation or other Sunni mujahideen groups, and had ties to the Iranian government. After the death of Khomeini in 1989, the Iranian government encouraged many of the Shi'a groups to combine and establish the Hezb-e Wahdat, hoping that they would be included in international negotiations. Between the Soviet Union's withdrawal in February 1989 and the fall from power of president Najibullah in April 1992, Iran supported the PDPA government. In the words of historian Barnett Rubin, "Iran saw the Soviet-backed Kabul government as the main force blocking the takeover of Afghanistan by Sunni Wahhabi parties backed by these three countries [Pakistan, Saudi Arabia, and the United States]. Although it continued to support Shia parties politically, it did not support their making war on the Najibullah government." In the meantime, over a million Afghan refugees were allowed to enter Iran.

In the early 1990s, following the collapse of Najibullah’s Communist regime in 1992 and amid mounting economic and social strains within Iran, including rising unemployment, Afghan refugees increasingly became targets of systematic harassment by Iranian authorities. This included the denial of access to public education for Afghan children, the confiscation of identity documents, and widespread deportations, often accompanied by physical abuse and extortion, especially for those without legal status.

In an effort to manage the growing refugee population and formalize their presence, Iranian authorities issued over 500,000 temporary registration cards to undocumented or newly arrived Afghans in 1993. However, the majority of these permits were revoked by 1996, once again exposing many refugees to the risk of detention and forced removal.

Following the emergence of the First Taliban regime and their harsh treatment of Afghanistan's minorities, Iran stepped up assistance to the Northern Alliance. Relations with the Taliban deteriorated further in 1998 after Taliban forces seized the Iranian consulate in the northern Afghan city of Mazar-i-Sharif and executed Iranian diplomats.

=== War in Afghanistan (2001–2021) ===
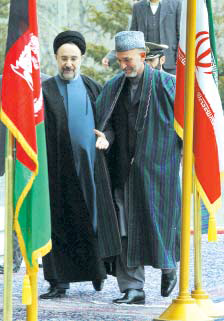
Hamid Karzai (right) and Mohammad Khatami (left), 25 February 2002 in Tehran

Since late 2001, the Afghan government under Hamid Karzai installed after the has engaged in cordial relations with both Iran and the United States, even as relations between the United States and Iran have grown strained due to American objections to Iran's nuclear program. Iran was an important factor in the overthrow of the Taliban and has since helped revive Afghanistan's economy and infrastructure. It re-opened the Iranian Embassy in Kabul and its associated consulates in other Afghan cities. In the meantime, Iran joined the reconstruction of Afghanistan. Most of its contributions are aimed at developing the Afghan Shi'a communities, especially the ethnic Hazaras and Qizilbash. Iran also has influence on political parties represented by ethnic Tajiks, which includes Abdullah Abdullah's Coalition for Change and Hope and others. On the contrary, many Afghan politicians and experts claim that both Iran and Pakistan are working to weaken Afghanistan.

Besides Afghan lawmakers, leaders in the United States and many NATO officials also believe that Iran is meddling in Afghanistan by playing a double game. Iran usually denies these accusations. For a number of years many senior ISAF officials and others have been accusing Iran of supplying and training the Taliban insurgents.

"We did interdict a shipment, without question the Revolutionary Guard's core Quds Force, through a known Taliban facilitator. Three of the individuals were killed... Iranians certainly view as making life more difficult for us if Afghanistan is unstable. We don't have that kind of relationship with the Iranians. That's why I am particularly troubled by the interception of weapons coming from Iran. But we know that it's more than weapons; it's money; it's also according to some reports, training at Iranian camps as well."

— General David Petraeus

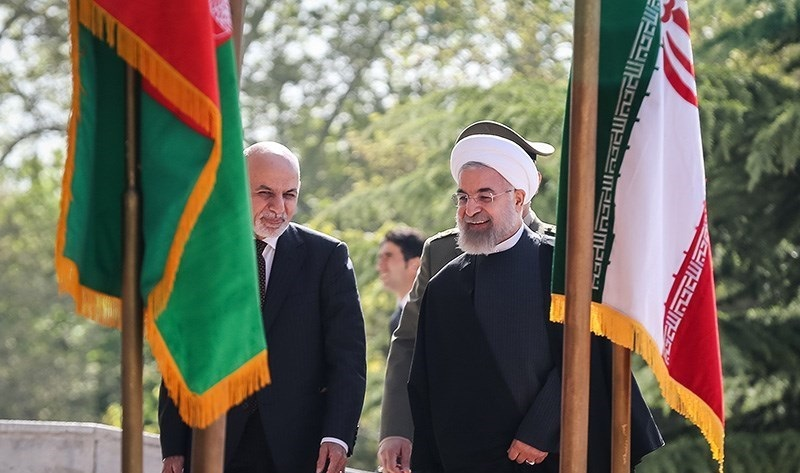
Presidents of Iran and Afghanistan Hassan Rouhani (right) and Ashraf Ghani (left) meet in Tehran, 19 April 2015.

The government of Iran is strongly against the American military presence in Afghanistan. Iranian officials often criticize specifically the American military in Afghanistan:

"The Americans will have the same success in Afghanistan as in Vietnam. Years ago the Soviet Union made exactly the same mistake. Many people were killed and it finally pulled out. History repeats itself. We know Afghanistan. We know that Afghanistan will never submit to foreign armies."

— Ali Larijani, July 2010

Ties between Afghanistan and Iran became further strained in recent years due to Iran's toughened immigration policy, hastening the repatriation of many Afghan asylum seekers. A number of Afghans were executed by hanging in public for crimes punishable with death in Iran (murder, rape, smuggling large amount of drugs, and armed robbery), which sparked angry demonstrations in Afghanistan. Between 2010 and 2011, Afghan and Iranian security forces were involved in border skirmishes in Afghanistan's Nimroz Province. In July 2011, Iran decided to cut off electricity exports to Afghanistan's Nimroz Province. In March 2012, Najibullah Kabuli, leader of the National Participation Front (NPF) of Afghanistan, accused three senior leaders of Iran's Revolutionary Guards of plotting to assassinate him. Some members of the Afghan Parliament accuses Iran of setting up Taliban bases in several Iranian cities, and that "Iran is directly involved in fanning ethnic, linguistic and sectarian tensions in Afghanistan."

"Currently, the Revolutionary Guards recruit young people for terrorist activities in Afghanistan and try to revive the Hezb-i-Islami Afghanistan led by Gulbadin Hekmatyar and Taliban groups"

— Syed Kamal, a self-confessed agent for Iran's Revolutionary Guards and member of Sipah-i-Mohmmad

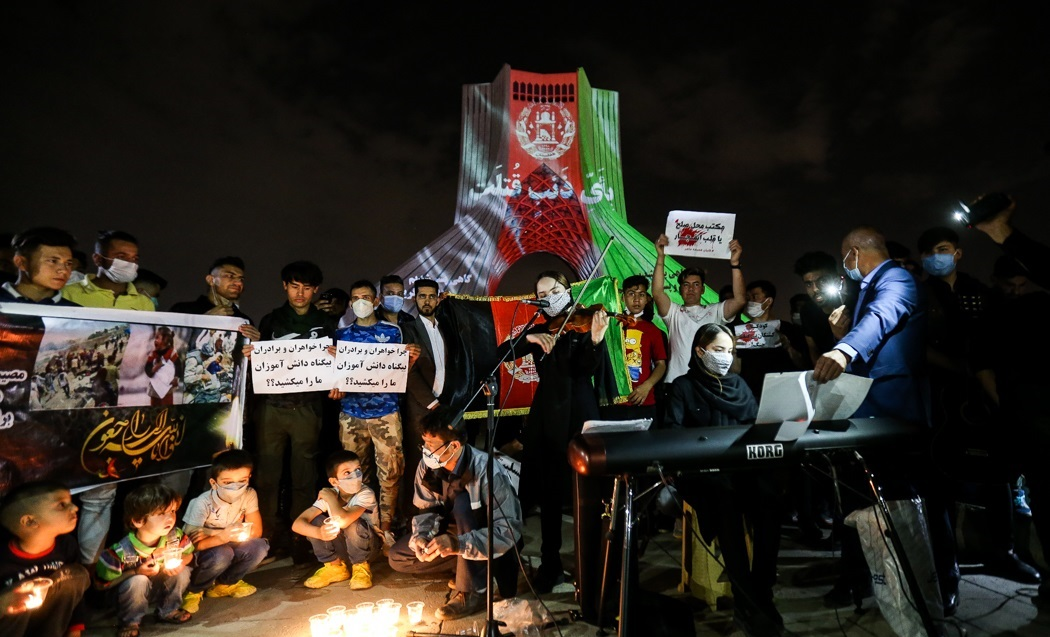
The Azadi Tower in Tehran was lightened with the Afghan flag to show solidarity with victims of the 2021 Kabul school bombing.

According to Saudi Arabia, Afghan Senate members certified the existence of documents which affirm that the Taliban collected endorsements from both Iran and Russia. Thus members of the Taliban are located in the cities of Mashhad, Yazd and Kerman in Iran. Moreover, the Governor of the state of Farah in Afghanistan, Asif Ning, also confirmed this in an interview with the Dari-speaking Freedom Radio stating: "They are living in the cities of Yazd, Kerman and Mashhad. They eventually return to Afghanistan to vandalize. At the time being, a number of senior members of the Taliban leaders are living in Iran", adding that "[t]he bodies of Taliban fighters killed in recent clashes were delivered to their families in Iran".

Afghanistan has an embassy in Tehran and a consulate in Mashad. In order to prohibit Afghans coming into the country that will bring issues related to the Afghan Civil War with them, as of 2007, Iran charges Afghans over US$100 for a one-month regular visa and a business visa costs them over US$3,000. Before 2007, the visa was issued with only $35 fee.

Fars News Agency reported that Ali Shamkhani, a member of Iran's Supreme National Security Council, had talks with the Afghan Taliban when he was visiting Kabul on 26 December 2018. According to The Washington Post, Iran's military had taken over some of the security operations at the Iran and Afghanistan border in 2018, in anticipation of the US withdrawal. In 2020, the Taliban publicly condemned the U.S. killing of the Iranian Quds Force commander Qasem Soleimani, expressing "deep regret over his martyrdom" and describing Soleimani as a "great warrior".

=== Second Islamic Emirate era (2021–present) ===
After the Taliban re-capture of Kabul in August 2021, Iran says its embassy in Kabul remains open, but it "strongly" condemned the Taliban's Panjshir offensive, with Iranian Foreign Ministry spokesman Saeed Khatibzadeh describing it as "by no means acceptable in terms of international law and humanitarian law.” The city of Tehran would even officially name a street "Panjshir Alley" in protest. Iranian strategists were dismayed by the prospect of a strong Taliban government in Afghanistan, recalling the hostilities with the First Islamic Emirate during 1996-2001 and its support of American invasion in 2001. The Deobandism of the Sunni Taliban is also perceived by the Iranian government as a direct threat to its Shia Khomeinist ideological ambitions. Hence, Iran has yet to officially recognize the Islamic Emirate. Since the Taliban victory, Afghan-Iranian relations has been marked by deepening border clashes and simmering tensions over mutual differences issues related to water policy, trade and Afghanistan's sidelining of pro-Iran elements from political power.

Different political factions in Iran have very different attitudes towards the Taliban taking power in Afghanistan. Mahmoud Ahmadinejad, an influential former Iranian President, even accused the United States of leading a "satanic and anti-human plot" to put the Taliban back in power in order to influence "all regional countries" such as Iran and also accused Afghanistan's neighboring country Pakistan, as well as Russia, and China, being co-conspirators who "trampled on [Afghan] people's lives, basic rights, and their right to self-determination to secure their own interests." Ali Shamkhani, secretary of Iran's Supreme National Security Council (SNSC), publicly insisted on an "inclusive" Taliban government which refrains from "use of military means" and instead of will fulfill obligations of "dialogue to meet the demands of ethnicities and social groups" among the people in Afghanistan. In September 2021, commander of the Quds Force Esmail Qaani, said that past sectarian conflicts have shown that the Taliban government was "no friend of Iran". In October 2021, Iranian Foreign Ministry spokesman Saeed Khatibzadeh stated that Iran supports "the right of all communities in Afghanistan to live a dignified life, including the Shiite community" and urged the Taliban to establish what he described as "an inclusive government" in Afghanistan. Khatibzadeh also said that Iranian government has been "in contact with all parties in Afghanistan", and that it was "too early to talk about recognizing any Afghan government". However, Ali Akbar Velayati, an advisor to Supreme Leader Ali Khamenei, described the Taliban-led Islamic Emirate of Afghanistan as part of the Axis of Resistance, with Iran at its core, a coalition of nations seeking "resistance, independence, and freedom." The prominent Principlist daily publication in Iran, Kayhan, also referred to the Islamic Emirate of Afghanistan as a member of the Axis of Resistance.

Since 2021, some sources have claimed that Iran has provided economic and military assistance to the NRF as a counterweight to the Islamic Emirate. Anti-Taliban commanders of the NRF like Ahmed Massoud and Amrullah Saleh are hosted in Iran. On 1 December 2021, violent clashes erupted between Afghanistan and Iran leading to casualties on both sides. On 3 January 2022, the Iranian government re-iterated its opposition to recognise the Taliban government until it embraced ethnic and demographic diversity. Regular series of border clashes between Iranian Border Guards and Afghan armed forces erupted during numerous intervals in the year 2022. However, Iran has maintained a degree of cooperation with Afghanistan since the Taliban came back to power, and the Taliban were even invited to several celebrations related to the anniversary of Iranian Islamic Revolution.

On 12 April 2022, Iran summoned the Afghan envoy to Tehran on Tuesday, according to Iranian state TV, a day after demonstrators flung rocks at Iranian diplomatic offices in Kabul and Herat over what they dubbed the Islamic Republic's "mistreatment of Afghan refugees." Afterwards Iran has confirmed allowing Taliban diplomats at Afghanistan's Embassy in Tehran, insisting, however, that the decision is not meant to pave the way for official recognition of the Taliban as a de jure government.

In June 2022, a magnitude 5.9 earthquake killed over 1,150 people and caused widespread destruction in southeastern Afghanistan. Iran immediately dispatched two cargo planes carrying first aid supplies to its neighbor after the disaster.

Iran's Islamic Revolutionary Guard Corps, which is said to have maintained close ties to the Taliban, has dominated relations between the two Islamic theocratic governments. IRGC member Hassan Kazemi Qomi has been appointed as Iran's ambassador to Afghanistan. The Taliban's nominee for Chargé d'Affairs was accredited by Iran on 26 February 2023, and the Afghan embassy in Tehran was handed over.

In May 2023, a border clash broke out again between the two sides. Senior officials from the two countries called for de-escalation after an apparently deadly clash over a river water-sharing dispute, though the local Taliban commander, Abdul Hamid Khorasani, threatened to "conquer" Iran if this continues.

On 26 January 2025, a delegation led by Iran's foreign minister visited Kabul and was welcomed by Amir Khan Muttaqi. This was the first visit by a senior Iranian official since 2017. Foreign minister Abbas Araghchi also met with Afghan acting prime minister Hasan Akhund and defense minister Mohammad Yaqoob to discuss tensions along their shared border, the treatment of Afghan refugees in Iran and water rights.

Since the beginning of 2025, Iran expelled 1.1 million Afghans, 600,000 of them in June alone. In March 2025, Iran ordered all undocumented Afghans estimated a about 4 million to leave voluntarily by July 6 or face forced removal. The outcome of the Twelve-Day War escalated matters for the Afghans as the Iranian government cited national security concerns, including unsubstantiated allegations of Afghan involvement in espionage for Israel, as justification for this unprecedented expulsion. Children made up around 25% of deportees, many of whom wree separated from family and lost their belongings. On arrival, returnees faced extreme heat over 40°C, overcrowded centers, and limited aid. Humanitarian groups and the UN have condemned the deportations as unlawful, noting many are involuntary and that conditions in Afghanistan remain unsafe.

On 15 February 2026, as the US military strengthens its deployment in the Middle East before the 2026 Iran war, the Taliban's chief spokesperson, Zabihullah Mujahid, said in an interview with the Islamic Republic of Iran's Pashto-language radio service that Afghans would be prepared to cooperate and support the Iranian people if the United States attacked Iran and Iran asked them to.

== Bilateral trade ==
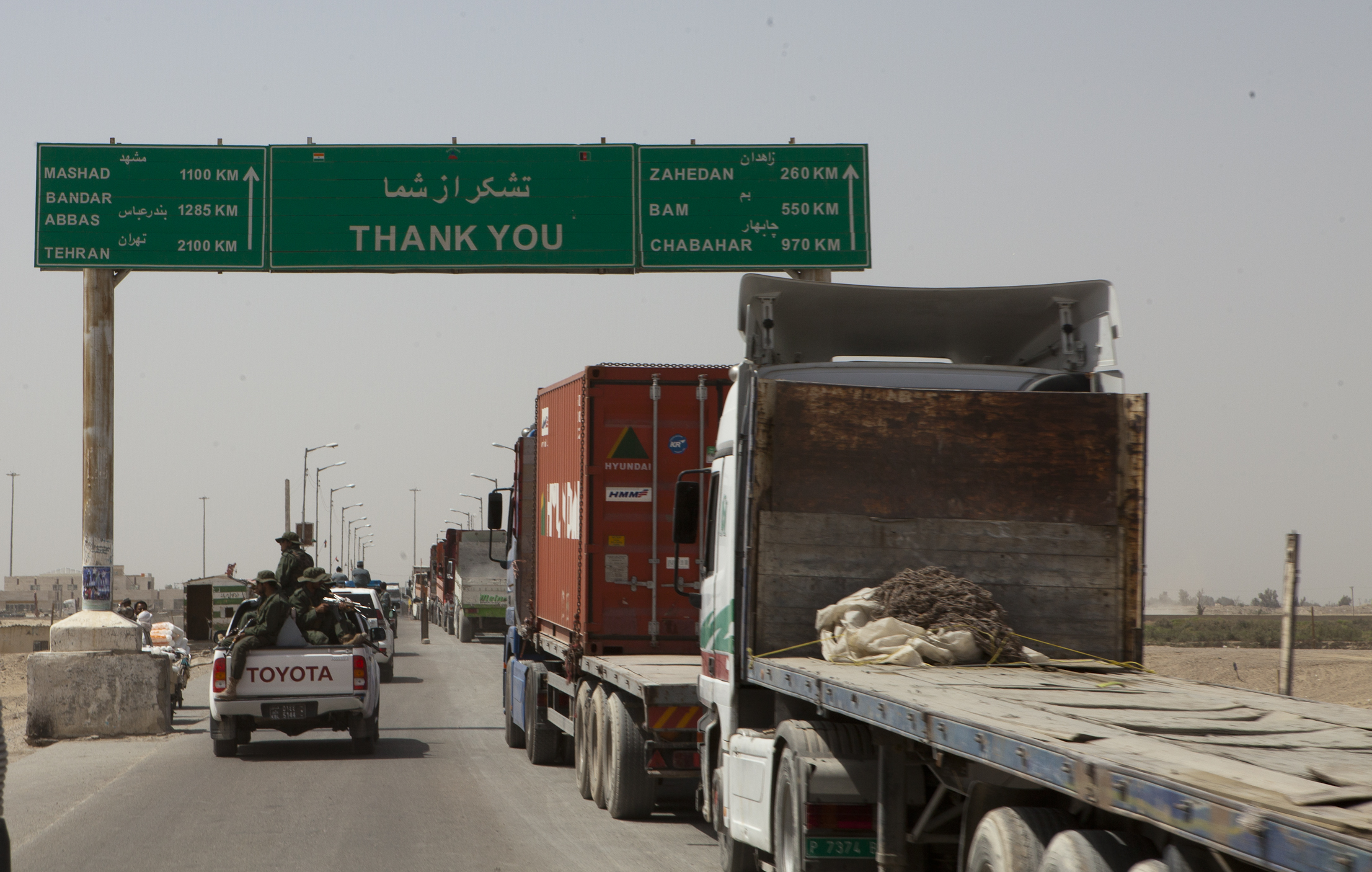
Delaram–Zaranj Highway in Zaranj, in the Nimruz Province of Afghanistan, near the border with Iran

Trade between the two nations has increased dramatically since the overthrow of the Taliban government in late 2001. Iran and Afghanistan plan on building a new rail line connecting Mashhad to Herat. In 2009, Iran was one of the largest investor in Afghanistan, which is mainly in the construction of roads and bridges as well as agriculture and health care.

According to the chairman of Afghanistan Chamber of Commerce and Industries, Iran's exports to Afghanistan in 2008 stood at $800 million. IRNA quoted Mohammad Qorban Haqju as saying that Iran imported $4 million worth of products like fresh and dried fruits, minerals, precious stones, and spices from the neighboring country. He said that Iran exported oil products, cement, construction material, carpets, home appliances, and detergents. Iran imported nuts, carpets, agricultural products as well as handicrafts from Afghanistan. Afghanistan imports 90 percent of its needs, except agricultural products.

Afghanistan is a major opium producer. Afghanistan produces 90% of the world's heroin. Some of these drugs are smuggled into Iran and from there to European countries. Afghanistan and Iran have been persuaded to cooperate with each other in reciprocal beneficial ways due to worsening economic conditions, according to The Diplomat.

Afghanistan and Iran are major trading partners since they share an extensive border region. As part of the trade corridor with Central Asia, Afghanistan exports to Iran increased to over US$40 million in 2013 (mostly in form of agricultural products), but then declined to below US$20 million in 2019. Iranian exports to Afghanistan, mostly in form of petroleum products, steadily increased to over US$2.8 billion in 2018. In 2021 after the US exit from Afghanistan, the Taliban announced that it would resume fuel imports from Iran. With its trading power and mineral wealth, Iran is seen as a major factor for Afghanistan's economic recovery.

In July 2023, During the first four months of the current Iranian year, Iran's exports to Afghanistan through the Dowqarun border increased by 8% in weight and 7% in value, totaling 150,126 tons worth $44.5 million, while transited goods to Afghanistan from other countries reached 170,829 tons worth $596.2 million.

In late February 2024, the Taliban-led government of Afghanistan announced an investment of $35 million in the Chabahar port in southern Iran. According to The Diplomat, cooperation between Afghanistan and Iran can provide the Taliban regime with more policy options and reduce its dependence on Pakistan.

== Iran's rights to the Helmand water ==
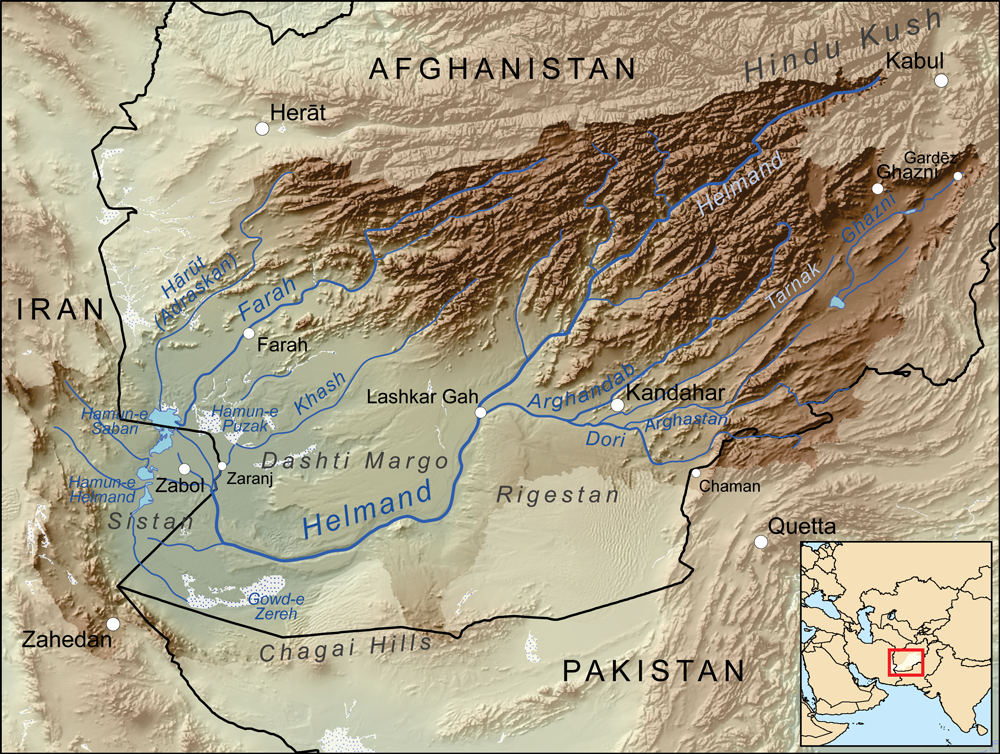
Map showing the Helmand River drainage basin

Disputes over the Helmand water occurred in the 1870s, flaring again after the river changed course in 1896. In 1939, the kings of the two countries signed an accord to share water rights, which was signed but never ratified. With a 1973 treaty between the prime ministers of both nations which Iran was supposed to receive a share of 820 million cubic meters of the river each year, but it again was not ratified. Prior to 1979, the year in which Iran underwent the Iranian Revolution and Afghanistan was invaded by the Soviet Union, the issue of water rights of the Helmand River were an issue of great importance between the two nations. During Ashraf Ghani's presidency, Afghanistan began building dams, such as the Salma Dam across the Harirud River and the Kamal Khan Dam in Helmand province, to store water and increase hydropower generation. Afghan officials have been discussing water sharing with the Iranians since the Taliban came to power.

Early May 2023, Iran emphasized technical cooperation and research in the field of exploration through the water commissioners of both parties, and demanded a "detailed" investigation of Helmand's water situation, and provided Iran with a quota in accordance with the treaty. It added that Iran reserved the right to take action against Afghanistan's "unacceptable" non-compliance with Iran's water rights treaty. Afghan acting foreign minister Amir Khan Muttaqi, and his Iranian counterpart Hossein Amir Abdullahian, held talks on expanding cooperation in several areas, including borders and water allocation. The Taliban-led political council met on 28 May, and approved the 1973 water treaty agreement, calling it the "best solution". Cabinet members also called for good relations with Afghan neighboring countries, especially Iran.

== See also ==
- Afghanistan–Iran border
- Anti-Afghan sentiment in Iran
- Afghans in Iran
- 1998 murder of Iranian diplomats in Afghanistan
