= Makaki =

Makaki may refer to:

- Makaki (Afghanistan), a refugee camp
- Makaki, Iran, a village
