= Sasuli =

Sasuli (Persian: ساسولي) may refer to:

- Sasuli, Dust Mohammad
- Sasuli, Jahanabad
