= Iran–Pakistan border skirmishes =

Iran-Pakistan border skirmishes
- Part of Insurgency in Balochistan and Sistan and Baluchestan insurgency
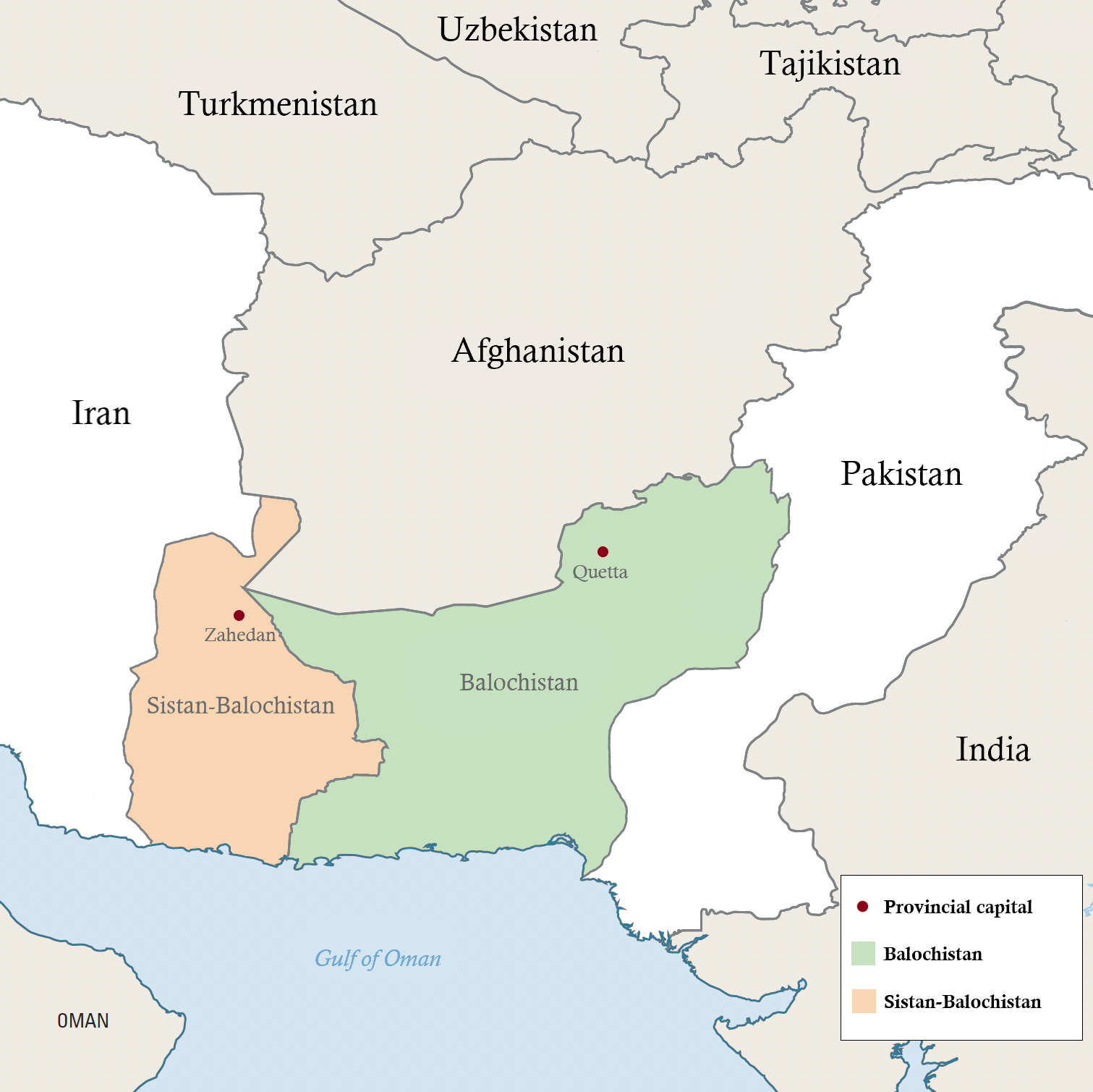
- Map of the Sistan and Balochistan province of Iran and the Balochistan province of Pakistan
Date	2014–2024
Location	Iran-Pakistan border
Status	Ceased hostilities

Belligerents
Iran	Pakistan	Islamist Baloch groups (Note: Iran has repeatedly struck Pakistani territory to crack down on Jaysh al-Adl members who attack Iranian security personnel through cross-border operations. Pakistan cooperates with Iran in suppressing Jaysh al-Adl.)
		Baloch Nationalist groups (Note: Baloch separatist groups against Pakistan engage in cross-border attacks on Pakistani security personnel from Iranian territory. Iran fights alongside Pakistan in suppressing these groups.)

Units involved
Islamic Republic of Iran Armed Forces; Artash; IRGC; Police; (no border) Border Guard command	Ministry of Defence; Pakistan Armed Forces; Pakistan Army; Pakistan Air Force; (Pakistan) Ministry of Interior; Civil Armed Forces; Frontier Corps; South Balochistan Corps	Jaysh al-Adl; Ansar Al-Furqan BLA; BLF

A series of occasional skirmishes have occurred along the Iran–Pakistan border between Iran and Pakistan since 2014. Both countries have sometimes accused each other of funding militant groups against each other, particularly related to Baloch nationalism. The skirmishes occur as part of the wider Insurgency in Balochistan.

Iran had accused Pakistan of sheltering and supporting groups such as Jaysh al-Adl, who actively engage in insurgency against the Iranian government. On the other hand, Pakistan has accused Iran of sheltering and supporting groups such as the Balochistan Liberation Army (BLA) and Balochistan Liberation Front (BLF), who actively engage in Insurgency in Balochistan against the Pakistani government with the goal of creating an independent Balochistan.

Despite these allegations, both countries have significantly cooperated with each other to combat Baloch militancy and ensure regional stability.

== Background ==
Pahlavi Iran was the first nation to recognize Pakistan upon the latter's independence in August 1947, and both nations have historically enjoyed cordial relations. During the Cold War, both nations were aligned with the United States against the Soviet Union and were part of mutual defence agreements such as the Central Treaty Organization. Iran also aided Pakistan in the latter's conflicts with India, supplying military equipment against India. For example, during the Indo-Pakistani war of 1971, Iran provided heavy military, moral, and diplomatic support to Pakistan, largely because it feared that a weak Pakistan would in turn encourage the rise of Baloch and Kurdish nationalism in Iran, ultimately destabilizing the country. Iran also provided substantial economic aid to Pakistan through its position as a rapidly developing country and one of the most powerful nations in the world.

In the aftermath of the Iranian Revolution in 1979, relations between the two nations changed. Ideological differences from the fact that Iran is a predominantly Shia Islamic republic while Pakistan is a predominantly Sunni Islamic republic. Despite these differences, Iran and Pakistan continued to maintain a friendly relationship as Pakistan became one of the first nations in the world to recognize the new Iranian government and offered its moral and diplomatic support to Ruhollah Khomeini, Iran's first supreme leader. Pakistan also supported Iran during the Iran–Iraq War with military aid that was initially purposed for use by the Afghan mujahideen during the Soviet–Afghan War.

=== Baloch insurgency ===
Both Iran and Pakistan have supported each other against Baloch militant groups that threaten to destabilize both of their administrations over Sistan and Baluchestan province and Balochistan province, respectively. The two countries have launched joint operations against groups such as Jundallah, Jaysh al-Adl, and the BLA. In 1973, Iran provided substantial support to Pakistan during the latter's operation in Balochistan against Baloch separatists. Pakistan has also aided Iran in capturing Jundullah militants and turning them in to Iran for trial and punishment. For instance, Abdolmalek Rigi, Jundullah's leader, was captured by Pakistani security forces in 2010 and given to Iran.

However, Iran and Pakistan have accused each other of failing to act against Baloch militant groups and possibly even sheltering and funding these groups. Iranian officials have often criticized that Pakistan's efforts against Jundullah and other anti-Iranian Baloch groups are not sufficient and should be questioned. Some officials even suggest that Jundullah relies on Pakistani funding and cannot survive without support from Pakistan's Inter-Services Intelligence (ISI). Pakistan also accuses Iran of not doing enough to combat the presence of the BLA and the BLF in the country, both of whom create serious security threats to Pakistan's interests in Balochistan. This mistrust has resulted in several border skirmishes between the two nations largely caused by the desire to unilaterally combat the issue of militancy in the region.

== Timeline of skirmishes ==
=== 2014 ===
16 May - According to the commissioner of Pakistan's Makran division, Iranian border guards opened fire on Pakistani territory, killing one Pakistani national and injuring another. Pakistan lodged a formal complaint with Iran.

17-18 October - According to Pakistani security officials, Iranian border guards crossed the international border and attacked a Pakistani Frontier Corps (FC) vehicle, killing one FC soldier and injuring three others. Iranian guards also crossed into Pakistani territory and seized the town of Nok Kundi, holding the residents hostage for six hours. Both countries subsequently exchanged mortar fire. Pakistan's ministry of foreign affairs summoned Iran's ambassador to Pakistan in protest of the clashes and demanded an investigation. The Pakistani government also demanded evidence from Iran that Pakistan is "involved in activities against Iran."

28 December - The Pakistan Levies informed Dawn, a Pakistani English language newspaper, that Iranian border guards fired 42 rockets into Pakistani territory out of panic after armed men killed three Iranian officials at a checkpoint along the border. The rockets landed in Zamoran in Kech district, and injured 7 civilians.

=== 2015 ===
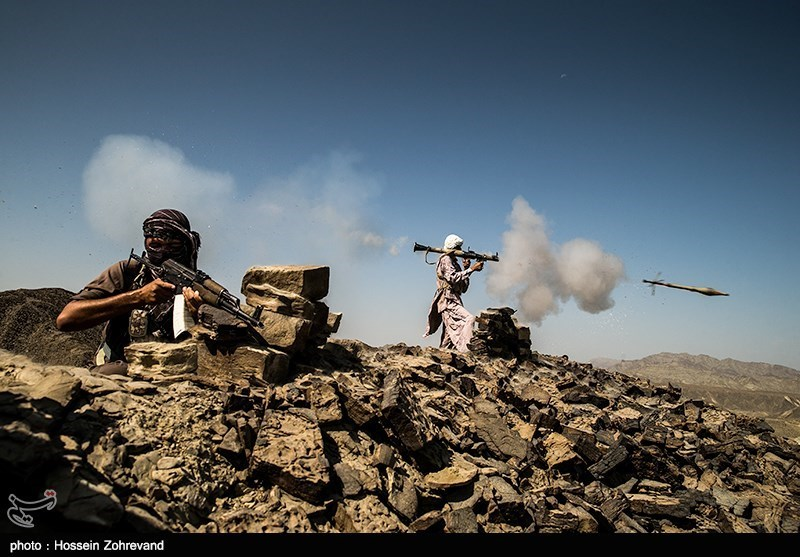
Iranian border guard rangers fire near the Pakistani border

July 2015 - According to a Pakistan Levies official, Iranian border guards fired four mortar shells across the border into Panjgur district, prompting the Levies to reinforce border security. There were no reported casualties.

=== 2017 ===
21 May - Iranian border guards fired five mortar shells in Pakistan's Chagai district, landing one kilometre into Pakistani territory causing panic among local villagers.

19 June - The Pakistan Air Force shot down an Iranian Shahed 129 unmanned aerial vehicle (UAV) that was flying in Panjgur district. The UAV was shot down by a JF-17 aircraft after it was flying 3-4 kilometres in Pakistani territory. The drone was the first air-to-air kill for the JF-17, and it marked the first time an Iranian drone was spotted in Pakistan. Iran had increased its reliance on drones for surveillance along its borders to monitor cross-border movements.

=== 2021 ===
28 September - According to Pakistani officials, Sepoy Maqbool Shah of the Frontier Corps was killed by a "terrorist" attack from Iranian territory along the Pakistani border. Another soldier was injured.

=== 2023 ===
18 January - Pakistani officials stated that four soldiers were killed along the Iranian border Panjgur district from a "terrorist" attack when militants crossed from Iranian territory and ambushed a security convoy on patrol. The Inter-Services Public Relations (ISPR), the media wing of the Pakistan Armed Forces, stated that the government had requested Iran to take action against terrorists using Iranian territory against Pakistan.

1 April - Pakistani officials announced that four soldiers were killed in a "terrorist attack" in Kech district during a routine patrol after militants crossed from the Iranian border. The ISPR announced that the Pakistani government contacted the Iranian government to launch effective action against cross-border "terrorist activities."

1 June - Pakistani officials declared that two soldiers were "martyred" in an attack on a security checkpoint along the Iranian border in Kech district. Pakistani forces subsequently launched a "sanitation operation" to eradicate remaining militants in the area, and Iranian officials were contacted to help thwart any militant escape into Iran.

=== 2024 ===
16 January - Iran carried out several missile strikes on Pakistani territory, claiming that it was targeting Jaysh al-Adl. Iranian State TV claimed that IRGC launched precision and drone strikes on two Jaysh al-Adl strongholds in Koh-e-Sabz in Pakistani Balochistan. Pakistan stated that two children were killed and four others were injured. In response to the attacks, Pakistan recalled its ambassador from Tehran and vowed that it has the "right to respond to this illegal act." Jaish-ul-Adl confirmed that its fighters and their family members were among the dead.

18 January - In response to Iran's strikes two days earlier, Pakistan launched Operation Marg Bar Sarmachar (Urdu: آپریشن مرگ بر سرمچار, lit. 'Death to Insurgents') in Saravan, Iran, launching strikes with fighter jets, loitering munitions, drones, and multiple rocket launchers on what it claimed to be strongholds of the BLA and BLF. The strikes marked the first attack on Iranian soil by a foreign country since the Iran–Iraq War. Iran claimed that 9 foreign nationals were killed in the attack, and the BLA acknowledged that its members were killed in the operation. A day later, Anwaar ul Haq Kakar, caretaker prime minister of Pakistan, announced that both countries agreed to de-escalate. Hossein Amir-Abdollahian, Iranian foreign minister, visited Pakistan on 28 January to restore the friendly ties between the two countries.

== Cessation of hostilities ==
In late 2024, both countries agreed to work together and cooperate to put down the Baloch Insurgency. Pakistan designated Jaysh al-Adl as a terrorist organization following with Iran doing the same to both BLA and BLF and with both countries ceasing support for each other's respective insurgents. In late 2024, Pakistan and Iran did a joint operation against Jaysh al-Adl, signalling an end to clashes between the two countries.

== See also ==
- Iran–Pakistan relations
- List of wars involving Iran
- List of wars involving Pakistan
- Foreign relations of Iran
- Foreign relations of Pakistan
- Iran-Saudi Arabia proxy conflict
