= Afghanistan–Iran water dispute =

Competing claims to shared rivers

The Afghanistan–Iran water dispute revolves around competing claims to shared transboundary rivers, particularly the Helmand and the Harirud. These rivers are vital for agriculture, livelihoods, and urban water supply in both countries. However, decades of mismanagement, prolonged droughts, and unilateral water infrastructure projects have turned these essential water sources into flashpoints of political and social tension. Since the takeover of the Taliban in Afghanistan in 2021, the dispute has escalated, intertwining hydropolitics with border skirmishes, environmental degradation, and the forced repatriation of Afghan migrants from Iran.

== Historical background ==
The Helmand River originates in Afghanistan's Hindu Kush mountains and flows southwest into Iran's Sistan basin, historically sustaining the Hamoun wetlands. Tensions over water allocation date back to the 19th century and became particularly acute during the 20th century. Following decades of failed negotiations, Kabul and Tehran signed the Helmand River Water Treaty in 1973, which allocated Iran a guaranteed flow of 22 cubic meters per second, plus an additional 4 cubic meters per second as a goodwill gesture - around 820 million cubic meters annually. The treaty also established monitoring at the Deh Rawood gauging station in Afghanistan to verify deliveries. However, disputes have persisted over whether the treaty applies in drought years, and both sides have accused the other of non-compliance.

In contrast, the Harirud River, which flows westward into Iran and Turkmenistan, has never been subject to a trilateral allocation treaty. Iran and Turkmenistan jointly operate the Doosti Dam, which supplies drinking water to Mashhad, Iran's second-largest city, but Afghanistan retains upstream control without binding international constraints.

== Dam construction and environmental impacts ==
Afghanistan has sought to strengthen sovereignty over its water resources through dam-building projects. The Kamal Khan Dam has been a major source of tension. Afghan officials describe it as vital for irrigation and hydropower, while Iran contends that its operation restricts Helmand flows in violation of the 1973 treaty. More recently, the Pashdan Dam near Herat has sparked controversy in the Harirud basin. Iranian authorities argue that its impoundment has accelerated the drying of the Doosti reservoir, threatening Mashhad's water security.

The ecological consequences have been profound. In Iran's Sistan and Baluchestan province, the drying of the Hamoun wetlands has fueled dust storms, devastated agriculture, and driven migration. Remote-sensing studies confirm that drought and upstream regulation have contributed significantly to wetland desiccation. Afghanistan itself has been hard-hit by recurrent droughts and erratic rainfall, which limit its ability to release water downstream even in the absence of political constraints.

== Escalations and border tensions ==
In May 2023, armed clashes between Iranian and Afghan border guards resulted in fatalities, underscoring the fragility of bilateral relations. Although both governments moved quickly to de-escalate, the episode demonstrated how resource disputes can fuel frontier instability.

Later that year, Iran dispatched a technical team to Deh Rawood to verify Helmand flows. Afghan authorities maintained that the river was running far below “normal” levels due to drought, while Iran accused Kabul of manipulating releases and withholding water.

== Current state (2025) ==
As of mid-2025, the dispute remains unresolved. Iran claims that it has received only around 100 million cubic meters of Helmand water this year, far short of the 820 million cubic meters stipulated under the treaty, while Afghanistan insists that drought conditions justify reduced deliveries under the treaty's provisions for abnormal years. At the same time, Iran is experiencing one of its most acute national water crises, with record heat, shrinking reservoirs, and government warnings of severe shortages across major cities. Against this backdrop, Afghan dam construction—both Kamal Khan on the Helmand and Pashdan on the Harirud—has heightened Iranian fears of resource insecurity.

== See also ==
- Water scarcity in Iran
- Afghanistan–Iran relations
