= Abdul Hamid Khorasani =

Afghan Taliban military general

- Native name: عبدالحمید خراسانی
- Born: Anaba District, Panjshir, Afghanistan
- Allegiance: Islamic Emirate of Afghanistan (Taliban)
- Rank: Commander
- Conflicts: Republican insurgency in Afghanistan; 2023 Afghanistan–Iran clash Afghanistan–Pakistan border skirmishes 2026 Afghanistan–Pakistan war

Abdul Hamid Khorasani (Persian: عبدالحمید خراسانی) is an Afghan Taliban military general. He was initially associated with the Panjshir resistance to the Taliban but defected in 2021 and killed several National Resistance Front (NRF) figures in the republican insurgency in Afghanistan.

Khorasani is known for his fierce rhetoric against perceived opponents of the Taliban, including Iran, Pakistan and Tajikistan.

== Life ==
Born in Anaba District, Khurasani was raised in Khair Khāna neighborhood in Kabul.

=== Islamic Republic of Afghanistan ===
Khurasani began his career by becoming a police officer and later he was fired from the position. He then led the Nahzat-e-Islami Muqawomat movement. Ministry of Interior Affairs put him on the wanted list for murder, extortion, hostage-taking, and drug smuggling, an accusation that he denied. On 9 January 2019, the police tried to arrest him by laying siege to his house but the attempt failed. Afghan security forces arrested Khurasani on 25 June 2019 in Kabul for attempting violence attack in a demonstration. During imprisonment, he established a contact with Haqqani network. Shortly after, he was released and expressed regret for his action. Afterward, he posted a video on YouTube and Twitter, saying:

I would die but not surrender to the Taliban's. Panjshir is my home and every Talib that steps here will die.

=== Taliban rule ===
In 2021, Khurasani joined the Taliban and was appointed as the security chief for Panjshir Province. He survived the NRF assassination attempt on 29 January 2022. Afterward, he released a video that threatened NRF if they still carried out attacks. In February 2022, he led the Taliban operation against NRF by searching and occupying caves and mountaintops in Panjshir Valley. However, the Taliban fired Khorosani as security chief for Panjshir Province in March 2022 after releasing video that urged Hibatullah Akhundzada to dismiss Maulvi Qadratullah as Panjshir governor. He was replaced by Atiqullah Sediqi. He later worked at the Taliban's intelligence department in Kabul.

During this time, he was also a controversial figure who uttered harsh words on social networks by publishing audio and video. For example, he said in a leaked audio tape last year that the Taliban arrested three of his people on the charge of wearing a pakul hat that is mostly a symbol of Tajiks. Afghan media also announced last year that the Taliban arrested his brother and four bodyguards on charges of arms smuggling.

In March 2023, he was appointed as the chief of Ahmad Aba District. After the 2023 Afghanistan–Iran clash, he warned Iran on Twitter and threatened to capture Tehran. In June, he fell to coma due to an accident.

In March 2024, during the Afghanistan–Pakistan border skirmishes, Khurasani warned that Pakistan 'shall be eradicated from the face of the planet' if ordered by Hibatullah Akhundzada.

Khurasani released an audiotape to Fasihuddin Fitrat calling for the trial and punishment of the Taliban members who were responsible for killing demonstrators during the 2024 Badakhshan protest and threatening to leave the group if justice was not delivered. He also criticized Taliban national linguistic policies.

Khurasani was arrested on 29 August 2024 on the order of Hasan Akhund due to "negligence and reckless speech." He was released on 9 September after being detained for 11 days.

== Personal life ==
In May 2024, Khurasani got married for the fourth time. However, some of the Taliban members criticized him for having an extravagant wedding ceremony.
