= Sasuli, Jahanabad =

Sasuli ساسولي
- Village
- Location within Iran
- Coordinates: 31°01′17″N 61°46′21″E
- Country: Iran
- Province: Sistan and Baluchestan
- County: Hirmand
- Bakhsh: Central
- Rural District: Jahanabad

Population (2006)
  - Total: 600
- Time zone: UTC+3:30 (IRST)
  - Summer (DST): UTC+4:30 (IRDT)

Sasuli (Persian: ساسولي, also Romanized as Sāsūlī; also known as Shahrak-e Sāsūlī) is a village in Jahanabad Rural District, in the Central District of Hirmand County, Sistan and Baluchestan Province, Iran. At the 2006 census, its population was 600, in 122 families.
