= 2009 Afghanistan–Iran clash =

2009 Afghanistan–Iran clashes
- Part of the spillover of the Afghan conflict
- Map of Afghanistan's Nimruz province where the clashes took place
Date	23 April 2009
Location	Nimroz province, Afghanistan–Iran border
Result	Status quo ante bellum

Belligerents
Islamic Republic of Iran	Islamic Republic of Afghanistan

Commanders and leaders
(Iran) Unknown	(Islamic Republic of Afghanistan) General Saifullah Hakim

Units involved
Border Guard Command	Afghan Border Police

Casualties and losses
1 soldier killed 1 soldier captured	None

On 23 April 2009, a clash erupted between the border guards of Afghanistan and Iran in Nimroz Province near the Afghanistan–Iran border. One Iranian border guard was killed in the clash and another border guard was captured by the Afghan border police. According to General Saifullah Hakim, the head of Afghanistan's border police in Nimroz, the clash was caused by the incursion by the Iranian border guards into Tang District of Nimroz Province. Iran's Press TV also confirmed that a clash took place between the border guards of two countries and one Iranian soldier was killed while another was captured in the clash.

The two countries had also clashed in 2007 and 2008 and would later clash again in 2021 and 2023.

== Background ==
Afghanistan and Iran share a long and porous border, which is used by smugglers to traffic drugs into Iran. Many Afghans also illegally cross the border to enter Iran. The activity of the smugglers along the Afghanistan–Iran border has been a source of bilateral tensions between the two countries. Border clashes between the border guards of the two countries are common in the area.

== Clash ==
General Saifullah Hakim, the head of Afghanistan's border police in Nimroz, told Radio Free Europe/Radio Liberty that the Iranian border guards had ignored the warnings issued by the Afghan forces after they illegally crossed the border into Afghanistan and entered the Tang district of Nimroz. In the resulting shootout with Afghan border police in Tang District, one Iranian border guard was killed, and another was captured. Hakim said that had been acknowledged by the Iranian officials and that the detained soldier, along with the body of the deceased soldier, would be returned to Iran. Iran's Press TV also reported the death of one Iranian soldier and the capture of another by the Afghan border police.

== Previous clashes ==
On 8 March 2007, one Afghan and one Iranian border guard were killed in an armed clash along the border of the two countries. The clash also left one border guard injured on both sides.

On 20 April 2008, an armed clash between the border guards of the two countries left one Afghan civilian dead and two Iranian officers wounded.

== See also ==
- 2021 Afghanistan–Iran clashes
