= Deh-e Hatam =

Deh-e Hatam ده حاتم
- village
- Location within Iran
- Coordinates: 31°06′12″N 61°48′48″E
- Country: Iran
- Province: Sistan and Baluchestan
- County: Hirmand
- Bakhsh: Central
- Rural District: Dust Mohammad

Population (2006)
  - Total: 187
- Time zone: UTC+3:30 (IRST)
  - Summer (DST): UTC+4:30 (IRDT)

Deh-e Hatam (Persian: ده حاتم, also Romanized as Deh-e Ḩātam) is a village in Dust Mohammad Rural District, in the Central District of Hirmand County, Sistan and Baluchestan Province, Iran. At the 2006 census, its population was 187, in 40 families.

== 2023 clashes ==
Border clashes took place on the Afghanistan-Iran border in May 2023, during which Deh-e Hatam came under attack by Taliban forces, though the attack was repelled.
