= Makaki (Afghanistan) =

Makaki is a refugee camp for internally displaced Afghans which was established in Afghanistan's Nimruz Province, near the Iranian border, by the Iranian Red Crescent around 2001. At the time of its establishment, Makaki was located in Taliban-held territory until the Northern Alliance gained control of the area in November 2001. The Mile 46 camp in the same region was in Northern Alliance territory.
