= 2021 Afghanistan–Iran clashes =

Cross-border armed clashes

- Part of the spillover of the Afghanistan conflict
- Map of Afghanistan's Nimruz Province, along the Iranian boundary of which the clashes took place
Date	1 December 2021
Location	Afghanistan–Iran border
Result	Status quo ante bellum (Note: Afghanistan captures several checkpoints, later withdrew.)

Belligerents
Afghanistan	Iran

Units involved
Islamic Emirate Armed Forces: 215 Azam Corps	Border Guard Command

Casualties and losses
- Both sides denied suffering any casualties while media reports claimed casualties on both sides

The 2021 Afghanistan–Iran clashes took place between the Islamic Emirate Armed Forces and the Iranian Border Guard Command along checkpoints on the Afghanistan–Iran border. The clashes occurred on the 1st of December, the cross-border fighting saw troops of the Islamic Emirate of Afghanistan capture several checkpoints on the Iranian side of the international border. The clashes ended later that day after the two sides promptly came to an agreement that saw the Taliban force withdraw from all captured Iranian territory. Iran and the Islamic Emirate of Afghanistan subsequently referred to the incident as a "misunderstanding" and denied suffering any casualties, although USA alleged casualties on both sides.

== Background ==
Relations between Iran, a primarily Shiite country, and the Taliban, dominated by Sunni fundamentalists, have historically been highly volatile. During the Taliban's rule of Afghanistan between 1996–2001, 10 Iranian diplomats from the consulate in Mazar-i-Sharif, were executed by the Taliban. This led to a military mobilization by Iran, which was resolved with the mediation of the United Nations. During the 2001 U.S. Invasion of Afghanistan, Iran cooperated with the U.S. forces and Iranian special forces supported the Northern Alliance during the capture of Herat.

During the 2001–2021 War in Afghanistan Iran improved its relations with the Taliban, during the war the U.S. and the Islamic Republic of Afghanistan accused Iran of providing sanctuaries and material support to the Taliban. In 2010, an Iranian Quds Force officer, who described as a "key Taliban weapons facilitator" was captured by NATO forces in Afghanistan. In 2017, the Islamic Republic of Afghanistan accused Iran of directly aiding the Taliban in their offensive against the Afghan government forces in western Afghanistan and claimed that Iran had tried to destroy a dam in Herat province. Iran has denied the accusations of providing support to the Taliban.

In the summer of 2021 the Taliban reestablished its rule over Afghanistan following the U.S. withdrawal from the country. In November 2021, National Resistance Front of Afghanistan's leader Ahmad Massoud and former warlord Ismail Khan met in Iran as part of their attempts to strengthen the Afghan opposition.

== Clashes ==
On 1 December 2021, clashes took place between the border guards of the two countries on the Afghanistan-Iran border. The semi-official Iranian news agency Tasnim, said that the clashes had started after the Taliban forces opened fire on Iranian farmers who had crossed the border wall between the two countries, which prompted the Iranian soldiers to intervene with heavy and medium weapons as well as artillery fire. During the ensuing clashes the Taliban fighters launched an attack on the Dahraes border checkpoint and overran it along with multiple other checkpoints in the Iranian territory. According to media reports, an unspecified number of combatants were killed on both sides during the clashes, while both sides denied suffering any casualties in the incident. The clashes ended later in the day after the two sides came to an agreement and the Taliban withdrew from all captured territory.

== Reactions ==
=== Afghanistan ===
Taliban spokesman Zabiullah Mujahid said that "a misunderstanding at the local level" had triggered the clash between the border guards of two countries. Mujahid added that "the situation was now under control with the understanding of both sides" and that the Taliban leaders in the area have been issued the "necessary instructions" to prevent such misunderstandings from happening again. The Taliban also did not report any casualties on their side.

=== Iran ===
Iran’s foreign ministry spokesman, Saeed Khatibzadeh, said in a statement that a "misunderstanding between border residents" had caused the fighting, without naming the Taliban. The semi-official Iranian news agency Fars, made no mention of the Taliban, saying smugglers may have been at fault. The news website also claimed there were no casualties.

== See also ==
- 2023 Afghanistan–Iran clash
- 2009 Afghanistan–Iran clash
