= Iran–Pakistan border =

International border

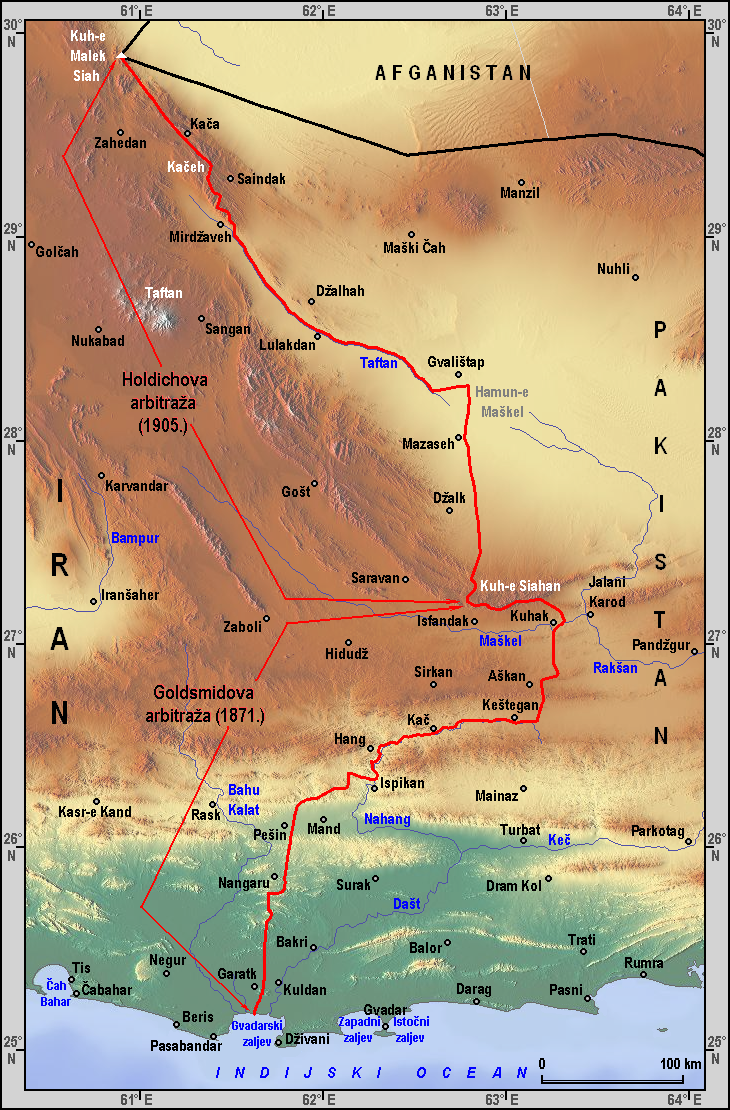
- Map showing the international boundary between Iran and Pakistan in red

Characteristics
- Entities: Iran; Pakistan
- Length: 909 kilometres (565 mi)

History
- Established: 1871 (first agreement); 1905 (current state) (British Empire and Qajar Iran)
- Notes: See Iran–United Kingdom relations for historical demarcation details

The Iran–Pakistan border (Persian: مرز ایران و پاکستان; Urdu: ایران پاکستان سرحد), is the international boundary that separates Iran and Pakistan. It demarcates the Iranian province of Sistan and Baluchestan from the Pakistani province of Balochistan, and spans 909 kilometres (565 miles) in length.

== Description ==
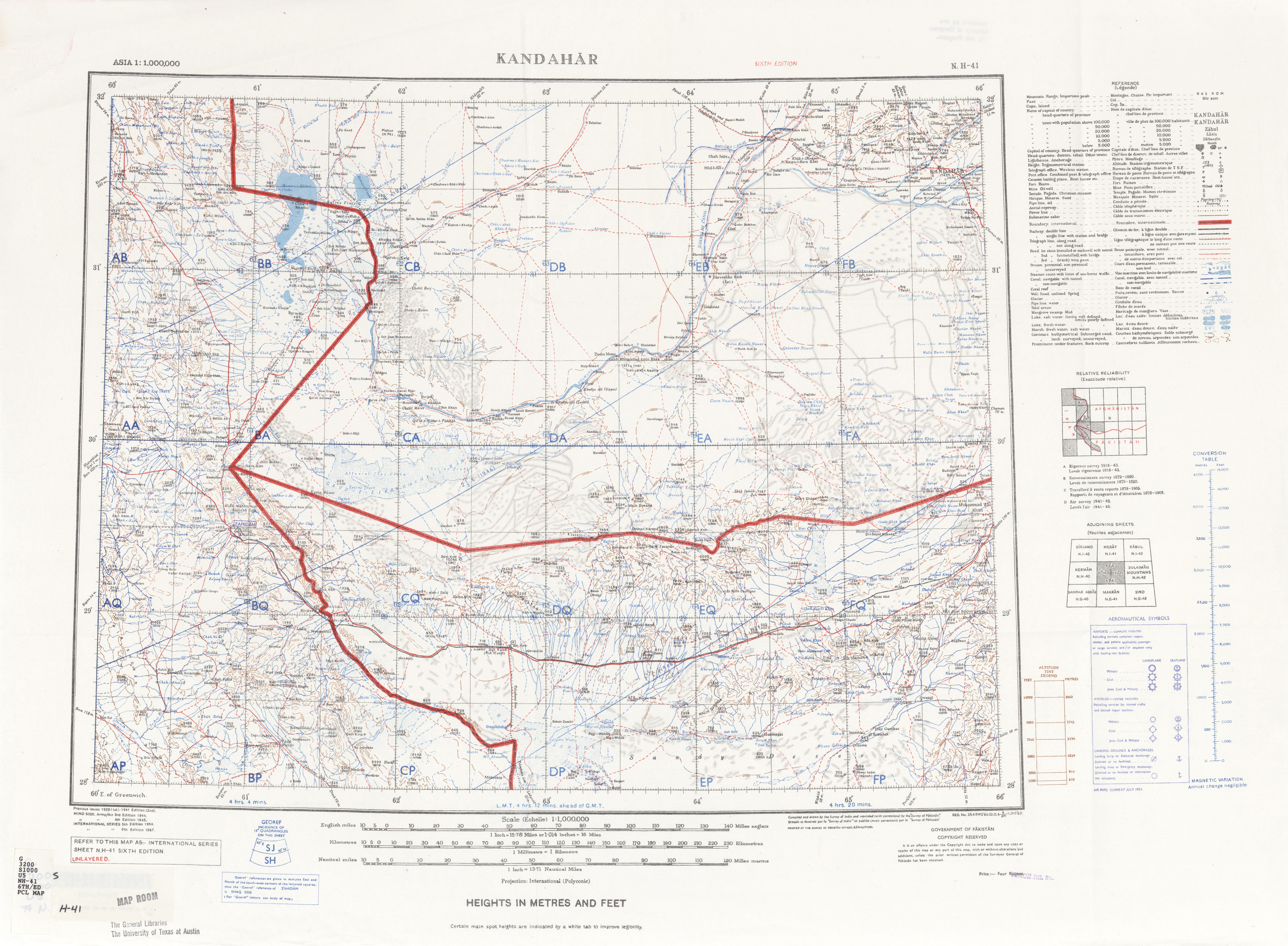
Map showing the international borders of Iran, Pakistan, and Afghanistan leading to a trijunction

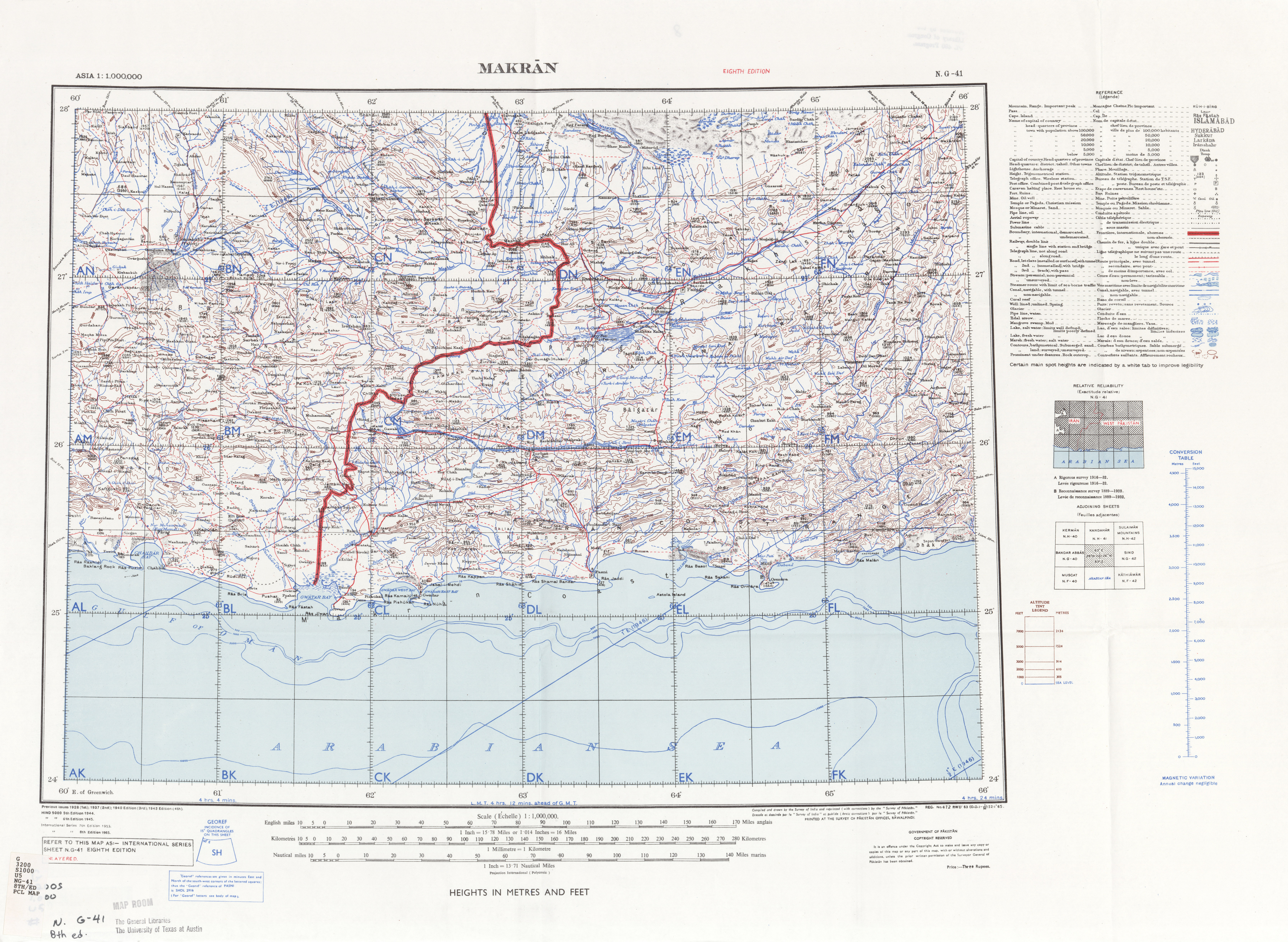
Map showing the southern end of the Iran–Pakistan border ending at the Gulf of Oman

The border begins at the tripoint with Afghanistan at the Kuh-i-Malik Salih mountain, then follows a straight line going southeast, then a series of mountain ridges, seasonal streams, and the Tahlab River southwest to the vicinity of Hamun-e Mashkel lake. The boundary then veers sharply southwards via a series of straight lines, then east along some mountains to the Mashkil River, which it follows southwards, before reaching the Nahang River which it follows westwards. It leaves the Nahang and then goes overland via various mountain ridges and straight-line segments southwards to Gwatar Bay in the Gulf of Oman.

== History ==
The modern boundary cuts through the region known as Balochistan, an area long contested between various empires centred in Iran (Persia), Afghanistan, and Pakistan. From the 18th century onwards, the British gradually took control of most of South Asia, including what is now Pakistan, bringing it into close proximity with lands traditionally claimed by Iranian empires. In 1871, the British (representing the Khan of Kalat) and Qajar Iran agreed to define their mutual frontier; a boundary commission surveyed the area the following year but did not mark the border on the ground. Some minor alignment issues stemming from this were tidied up via another joint treaty in 1905.

In 1947, the British departed, and Pakistan gained independence and British India ended.Iran and Pakistan confirmed their mutual border by treaty in 1958–59, fully mapping the border area and demarcating it on the ground with pillars.

In June 2023, there was a terrorist attack at the Iran-Pakistan border. Some Pakistan border patrol officers were killed. A few days before that, there was another terrorist attack at the border and 5 Iranian border patrol officers were killed.

On 16 June 2025, Pakistan indefinitely closed the border with Iran amid the Twelve-Day War.

== Border barriers ==
=== Iranian fencing project (2011) ===
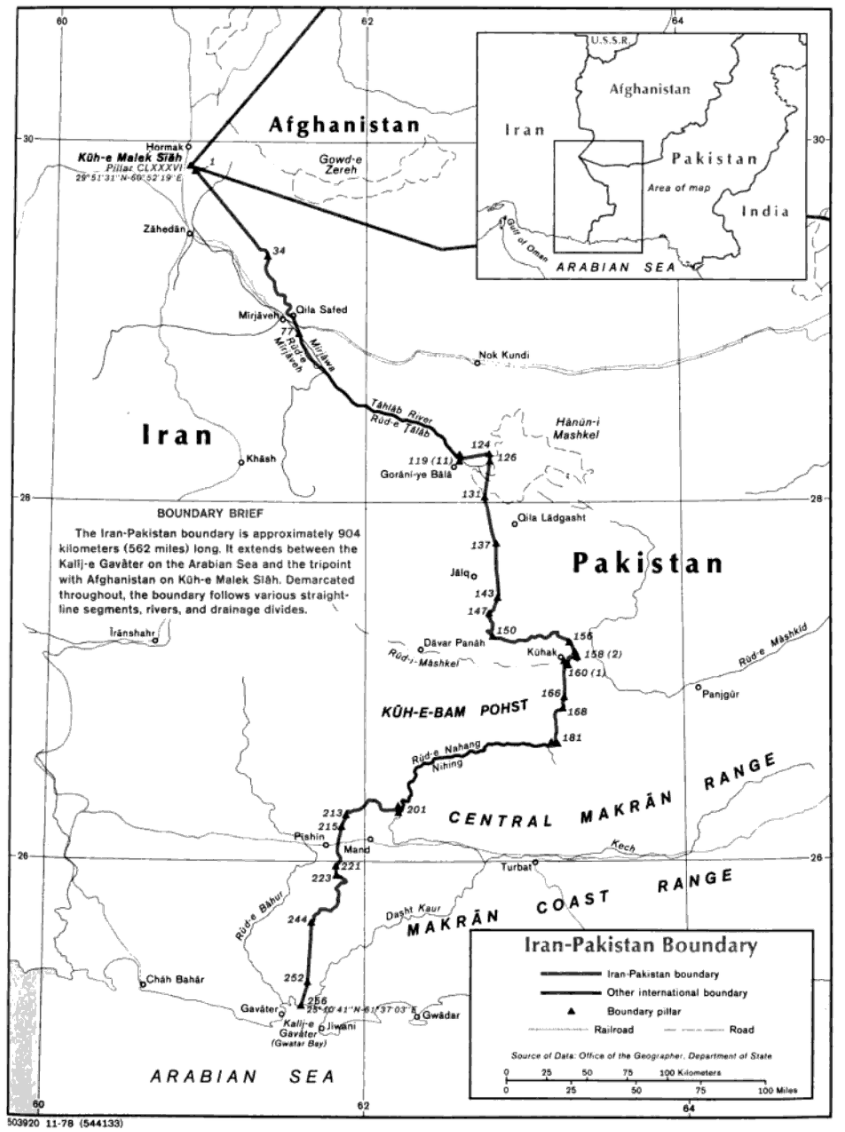
Brief map of the Iran–Pakistan border

The 3 ft (91.4 cm) thick and 10 ft (3.05 m) high concrete wall, fortified with steel rods, will span the 700 km frontier stretching from Taftan to Mand. The project will include large earth and stone embankments and deep ditches to deter illegal trade crossings and drug smuggling to both sides. The border region is already dotted with police observation towers and fortress-style garrisons for troops. Iran and Pakistan do not have border disputes or other irredentist claims, and Pakistan's Foreign Ministry has stated, "Pakistan has no reservation because Iran is constructing the fence on its territory."

=== History and stated purpose ===
The wall is being constructed to stop illegal border crossings and stem the flow of drugs, and is also a response to terror attacks, notably the one in the Iranian border town of Zahedan on 17 February 2007, which killed 13 people, including nine Iranian Revolutionary Guard officials. However Pakistani Foreign Ministry spokeswoman Tasnim Aslam denied any link between the fence and the bomb blast, saying that Iran was not blaming these incidents on Pakistan.

=== Reactions to the barrier ===
The Foreign Ministry of Pakistan has stated that Iran has the right to erect border fencing in its territory. However, opposition to the construction of the wall was raised in the Provincial Assembly of Balochistan. It maintained that the wall would create problems for the local people whose lands straddle the border region. They apprehended the barrier would further divide politically and socially the local population and impede trade and social activities. An opposition leader in the provincial assembly in 2007 said the governments of the two countries should take the people of the area into confidence, and demanded a stop to the construction of the barrier.

=== Pakistani fencing project (2019) ===
In 2019, Pakistan announced its intention to fence its border with Iran. In May 2019, Pakistan allocated $18.6 million to fund the border fencing project. In September 2021, Pakistan approved an additional $58.5 million for border fencing. As of mid-2021, Pakistan had completed 46% of the border fencing and aimed to finish the project by December 2021. As of January 2022, Pakistan had fenced 80% of the border. The Interior Ministry confirmed plans to fence the remaining border sections.

== Border crossings and markets ==
External videos
- Strict exchange of words between Iranian Revolutionary Border Guards and Pakistan Frontier Corps (FC) Balochistan

On the Pakistani side, the Frontier Corps oversees border security and immigration. In Iran, the Iranian Revolutionary Guards are responsible for border security.

Pakistan and Iran share four official border crossings. Taftan and Gabd serve both pedestrians and trade, while Mand and Chadgi are exclusively for trade. Since Iran drives on the right, and Pakistan on the left, the border crossings require road traffic to change sides.

Additionally, both countries have agreed to establish six joint-border markets to enhance trade. Initially, three markets will open at the border points of Kuhak-Chadgi, Rimdan-Gabd, and Pishin-Mand areas. The remaining three markets will be established in the second phase. Currently, the first three border markets out of six have been constructed and are operational at Gabd, Mand, and Chadgi.

Border gate at Taftan

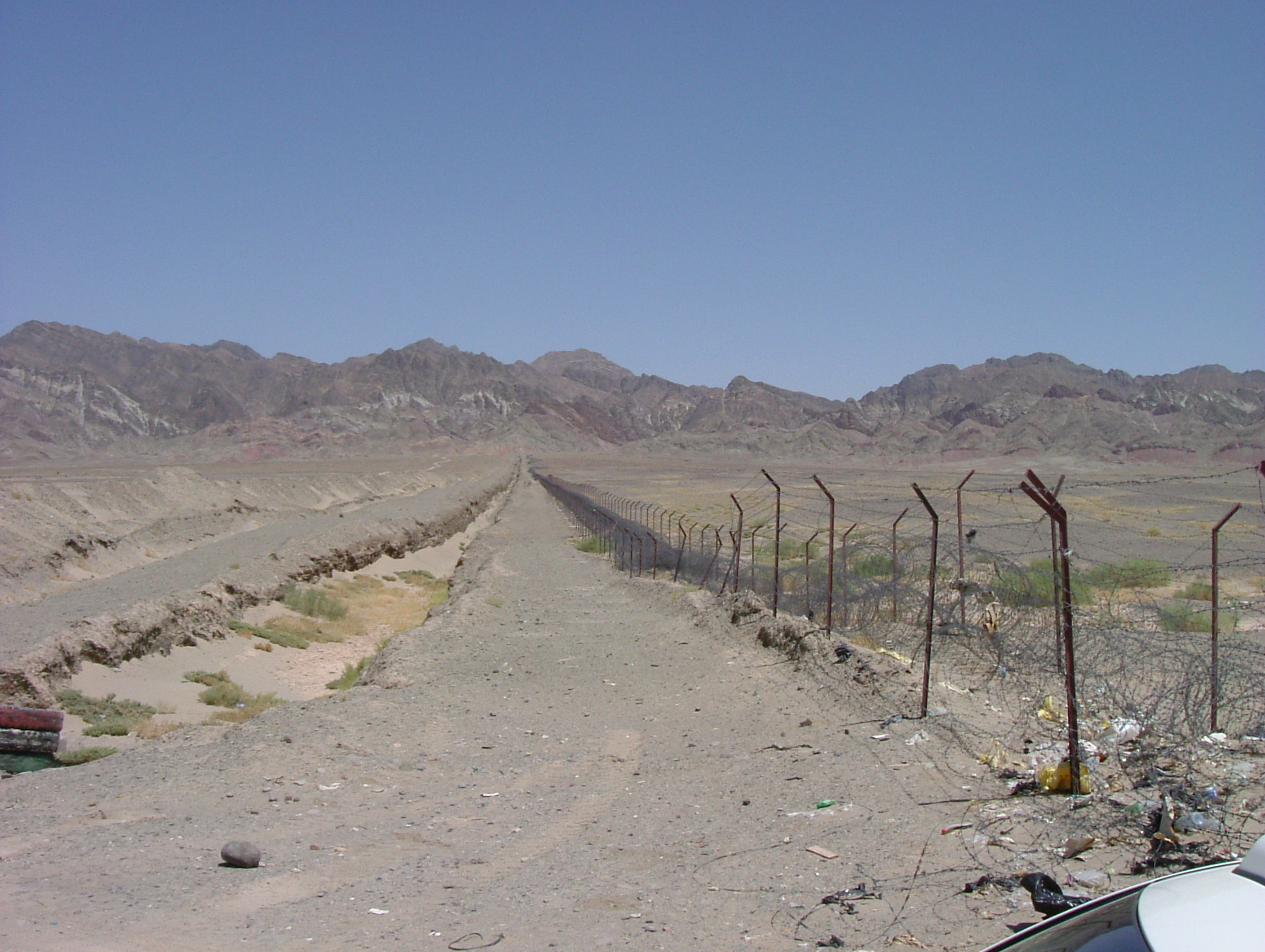
Fence along the border near the Iranian city of Zahedan in 2006

=== Road ===
Border crossings/markets
| # | Crossing | Counterpart | Road | Province | Opened | Purpose | Status |
|---|---|---|---|---|---|---|---|
| 1 | Taftan | Mirjaveh | N-40 - Road 84 | Balochistan-Sistan Balochistan | | Miscellaneous | Operational |
| 2 | Gabd (Gwadar) | Chabahar (Rimdan) | N-10 - Bahukalat Protected Area Road | Balochistan-Sistan Balochistan | 20.12.2020 | Miscellaneous | Operational |
| 3 | Mand | Pishin | Turbat - Road 92 | Balochistan-Sistan Balochistan | 21.04.2021 | Trade | Operational |
| 4 | Chadgi | Kuhak | Pishin-Kurumb road | Balochistan-Sistan Balochistan | | Trade | Operational |

=== Rail ===
- Taftan / Mirjaveh, on the line between Quetta and Zahedan

== Settlements near the border ==
=== Iran ===
- Lar Marud
- Zahedan
- Kacheh Rud
- Mirjaveh
- Ladiz
- Narreh Now
- Jaleq
- Kalleh
- Fahreh
- Murt
- Esfandak
- Kavari
- Pishin
- Kushak

=== Pakistan ===
- Sohtagan
- Qila Ladgasht
- Washap
- Sar-i Parom
- Girbum
- Sohrag
- Abdui
- Taftan
- Sirag
- Kurumb
- Jiwani

== See also ==
- Iran-Pakistan border skirmishes
- Iran–Pakistan relations
