= Sasuli, Dust Mohammad =

Sasuli ساسولی
- village
- Location within Iran
- Coordinates: 31°06′32″N 61°48′23″E
- Country: Iran
- Province: Sistan and Baluchestan
- County: Hirmand
- Bakhsh: Central
- Rural District: Dust Mohammad

Population (2006)
  - Total: 568
- Time zone: UTC+3:30 (IRST)
  - Summer (DST): UTC+4:30 (IRDT)

Sasuli (Persian: ساسولی, also Romanized as Sāsūlī; also known as Deh-e Sāsūlī and Sālsūlī) is a village in Dust Mohammad Rural District, in the Central District of Hirmand County, Sistan and Baluchestan Province, Iran. At the 2006 census, its population was 568, in 115 families.

== 2023 clashes ==
Border clashes took place on the Afghanistan-Iran border in May 2023, during which Sasuli came under attack by Taliban forces, though the attack was repelled.
