= Border Guard Command (Iran) =

Iran's Customs and Borders Protection Command

Border Guard Command فرماندهی مرزبانی

Agency overview
- Formed: 2000

Jurisdictional structure
- National agency: Iran
- Operations jurisdiction: Iran
- General nature: Gendarmerie
- Specialist jurisdictions: National border patrol, security, integrity; Coastal patrol, marine border protection, marine search and rescue; Water ways, bodies, coastal areas; Customs, excise, gambling

Operational structure
- Agency executive: Brigadier general Aliakbar Javidan
- Parent agency: Law Enforcement Force (Iran)

The Border Guard Command (Persian: فرماندهی مرزبانی جمهوری اسلامی ایران , romanized: Fərmândēhi-ē Mərzbâni Jomhūri-ē Ēslâmi-ē Irân), commonly known as FARAJA Border Guard (Persian: مرزبانی فراجا), is a subdivision of the Law Enforcement Force (FARAJA) and Iran's sole agency that performs border guard and border control duties for land borders, and coast guard duties for maritime borders. The unit was founded in 2000. Between 1991 and 2000, border control was the responsibility of the Security deputy of FARAJA. Prior to 1991, border control was the responsibility of the Gendarmerie.

== History ==
In 2023 FARAJA borderguard command decided to deploy manpower, electronic optical systems, and cameras throughout the east border to enhance defenses.

FARAJA controls 97% of the borders through 16 provinces, three percent of the borders belong to other Islamic Republic military services (IRGC).

Amongst other barriers, the command has built a pipe barrier on the Iraqi border. Along the border with Pakistan and Turkey the barrier includes walls and barricaded borders.

== Gallery ==
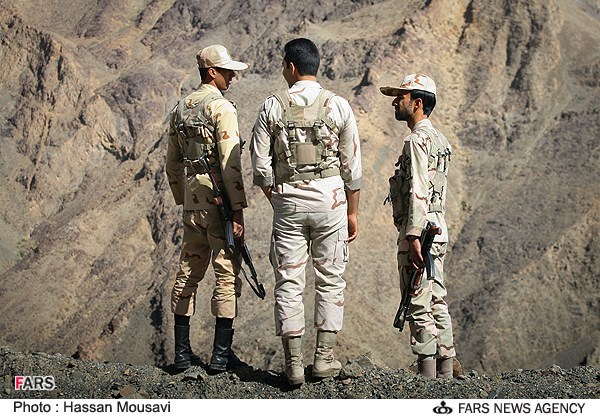
NAJA border guard in Sistan and Balochestan province

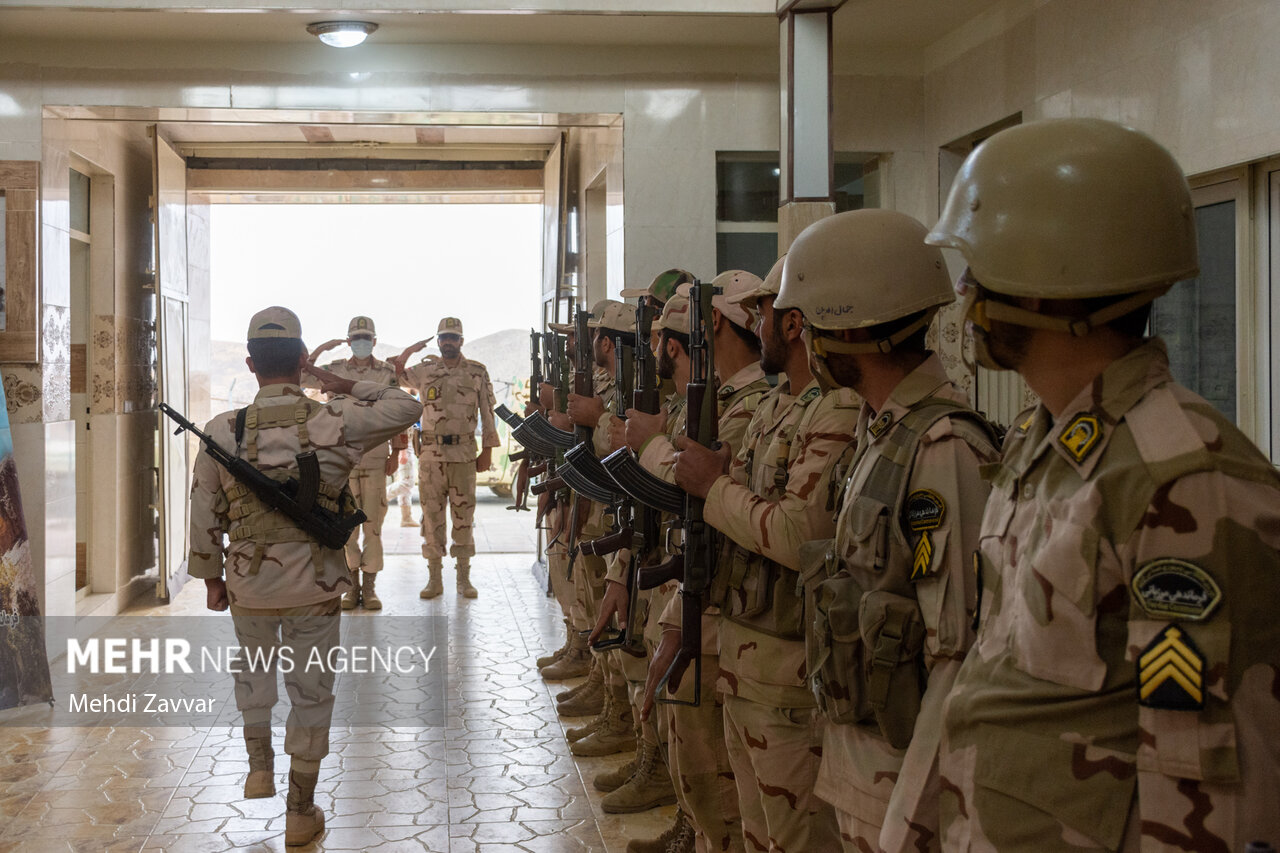
NAJA Border guards in Sardasht, Iran.

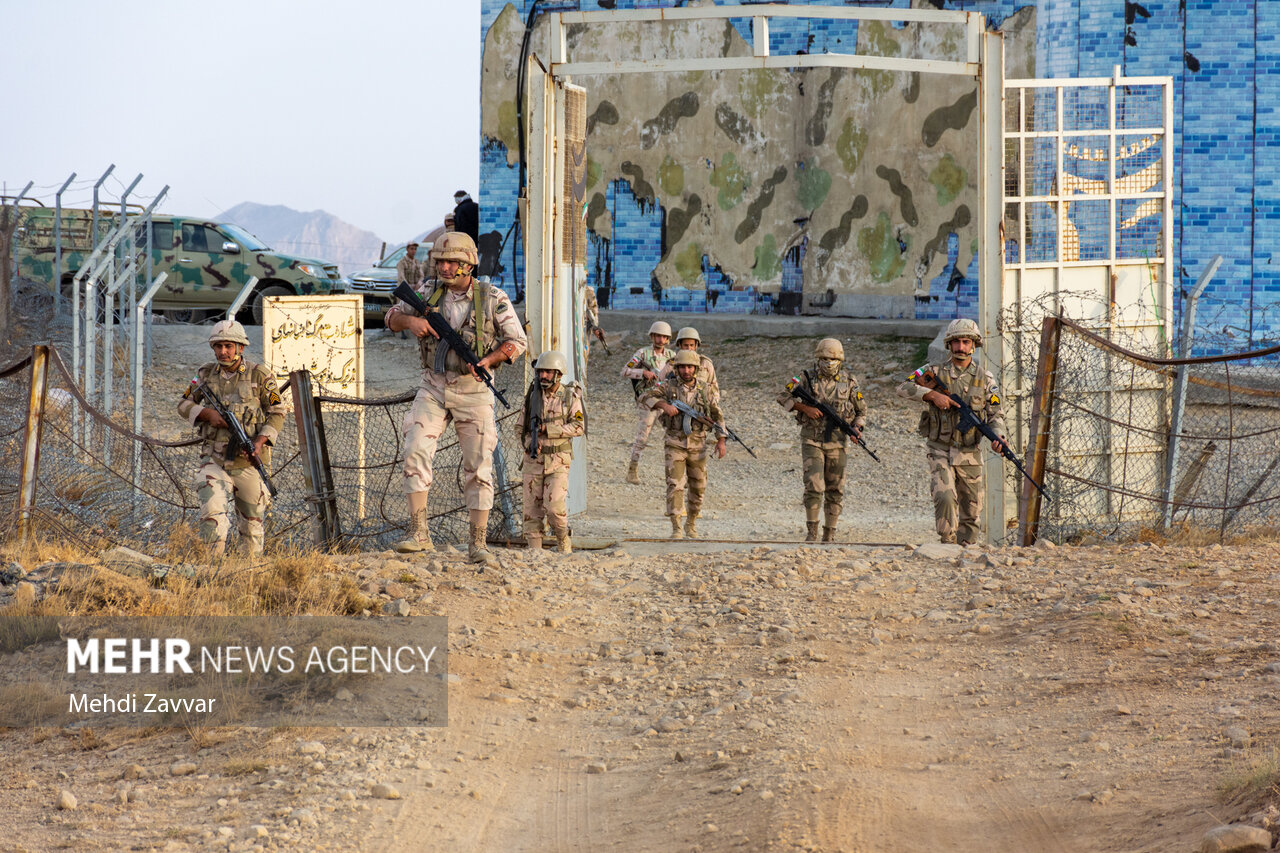
Iranian border guards patrol Sardasht on the border with Iraq.

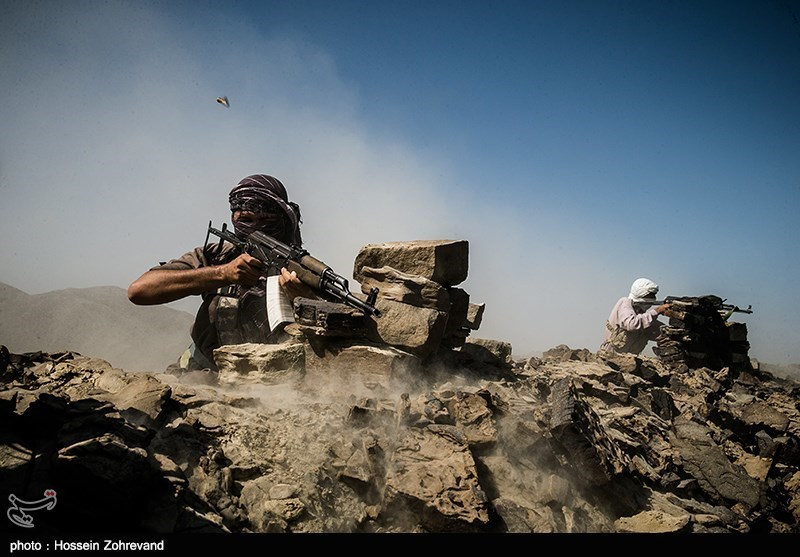
NAJA border guard rangers engage militants on the Iran-Pakistan border

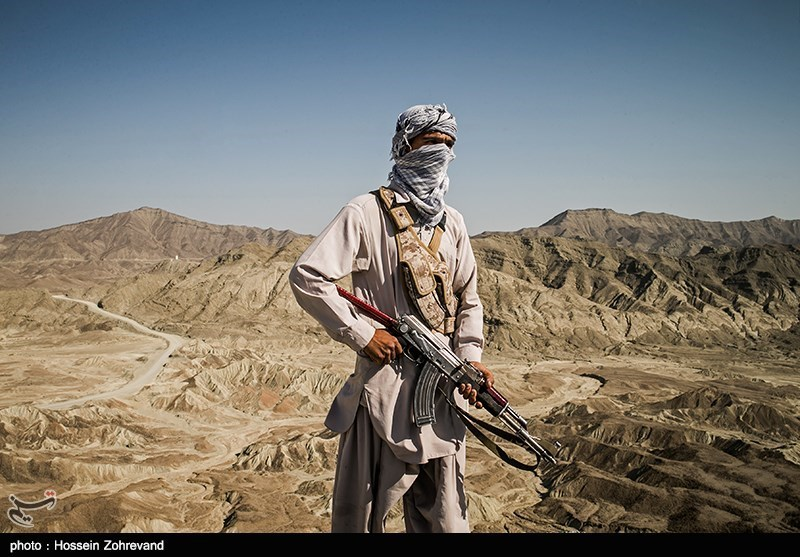
A NAJA border guard ranger on the Iran-Pakistan border keeping watch

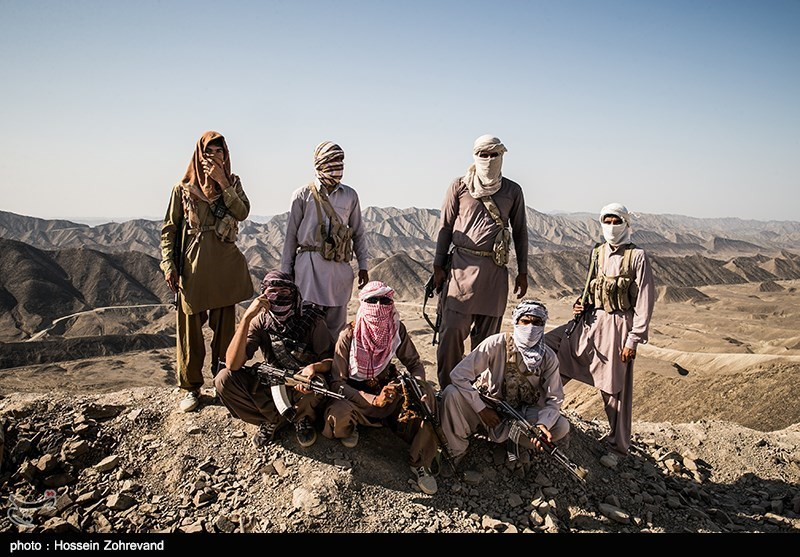
NAJA border guard rangers posing for a picture near the Iran-Pakistan border

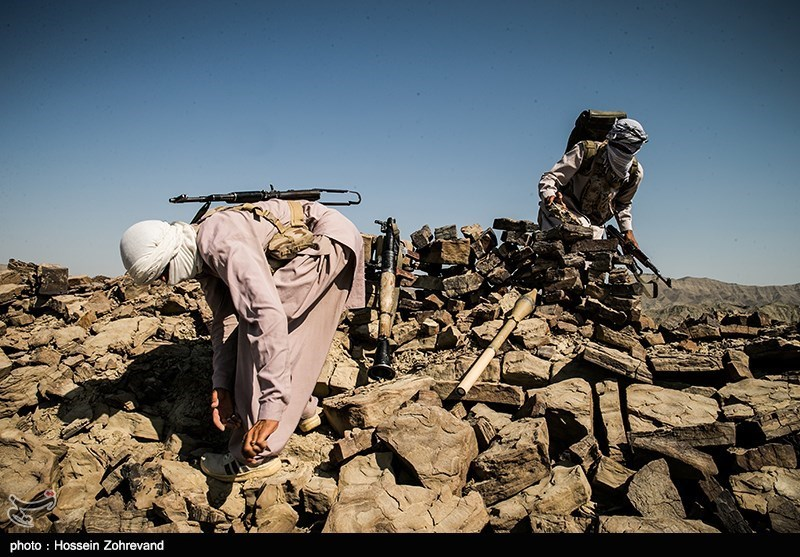
NAJA border guard rangers on the Iran-Pakistan border securing their position

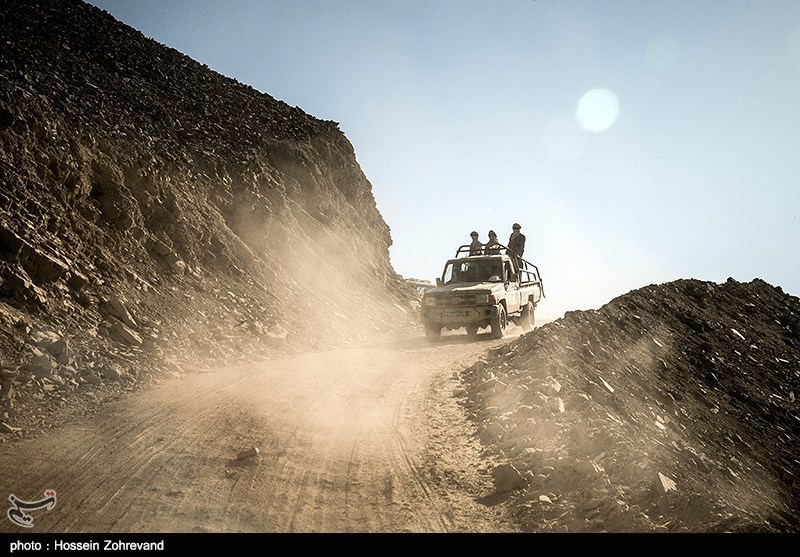
NAJA border guard rangers patrolling in a vehicle on the Iran-Pakistan border

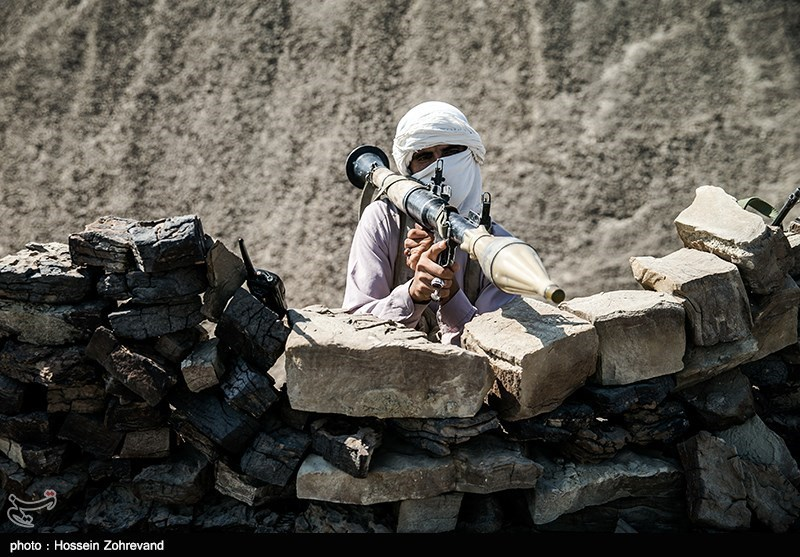
A NAJA border guard ranger takes aim with his RPG on the Iran-Pakistan border

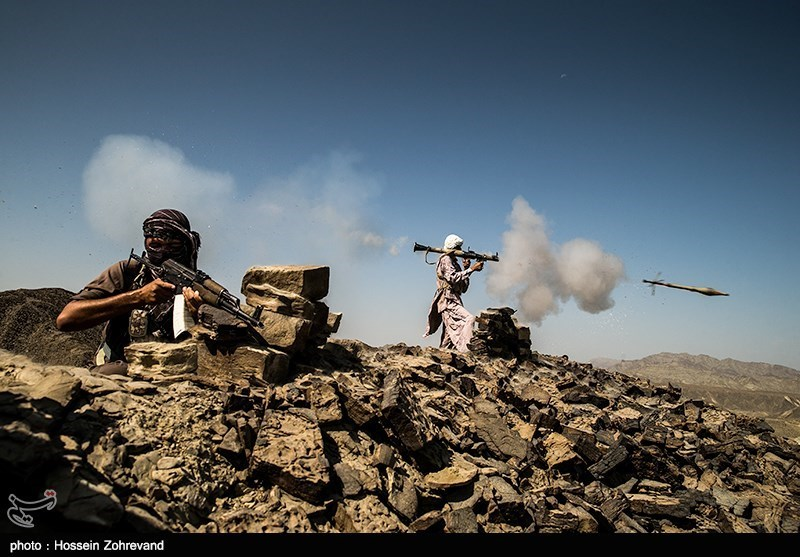
NAJA border guard rangers engage militants on the Iran-Pakistan border

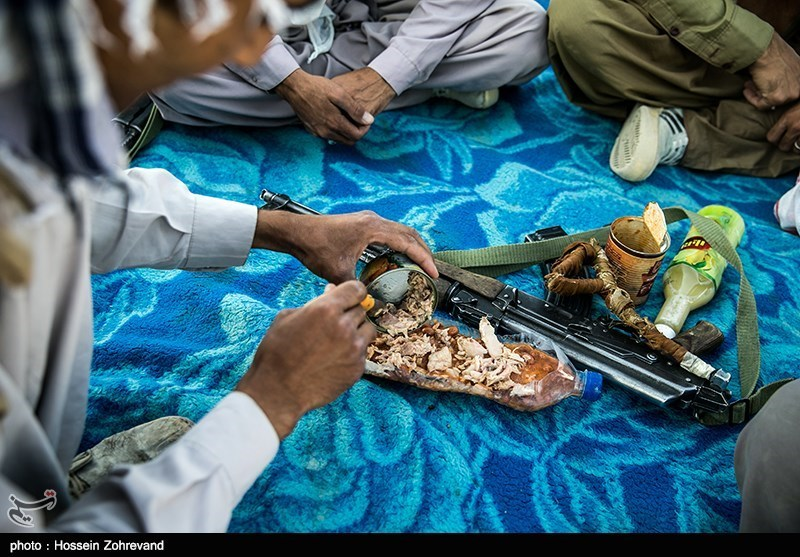
NAJA border guard rangers on the Iran-Pakistan border eating

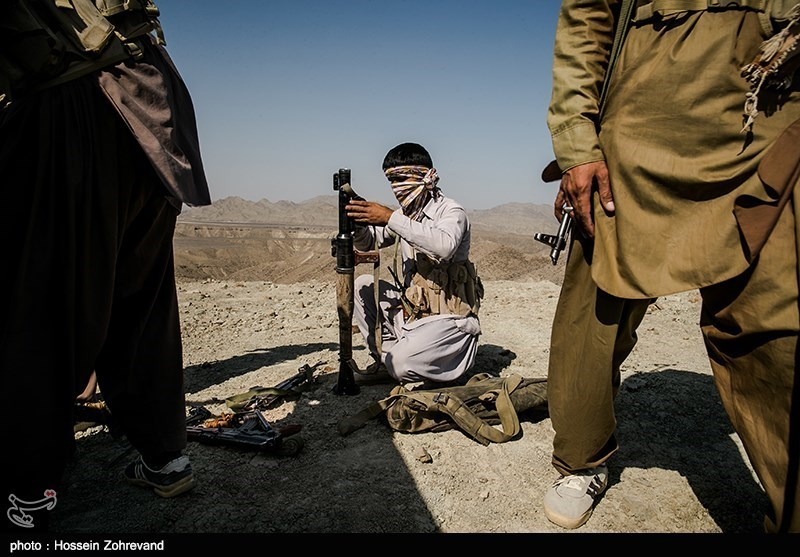
NAJA border guard rangers on the Iran-Pakistan border border

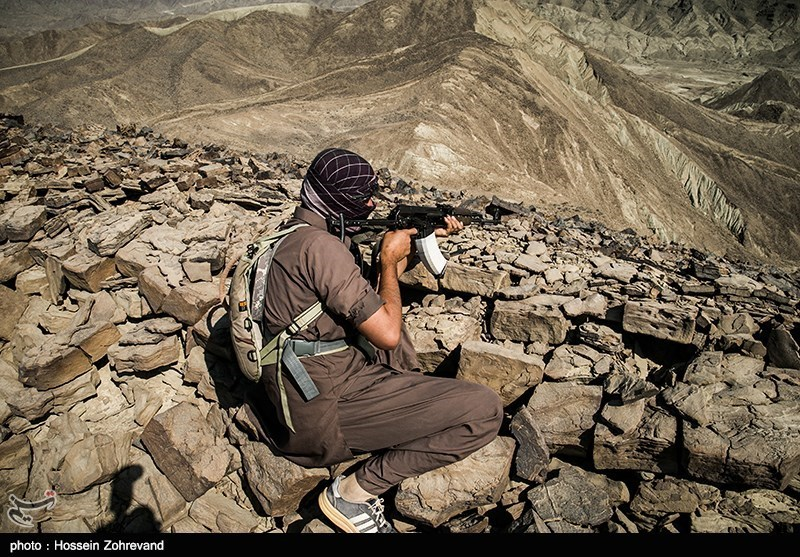
NAJA border guard rangers on the Iran-Pakistan border

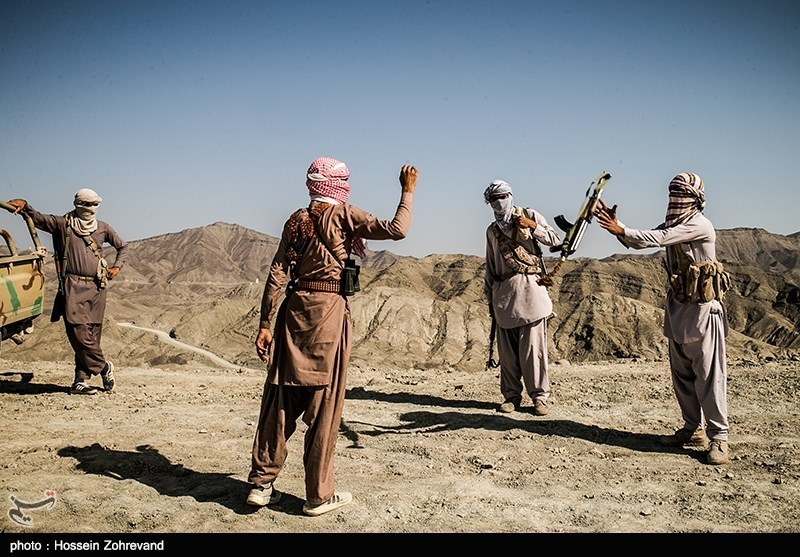
NAJA border guard rangers on the Iran-Pakistan border

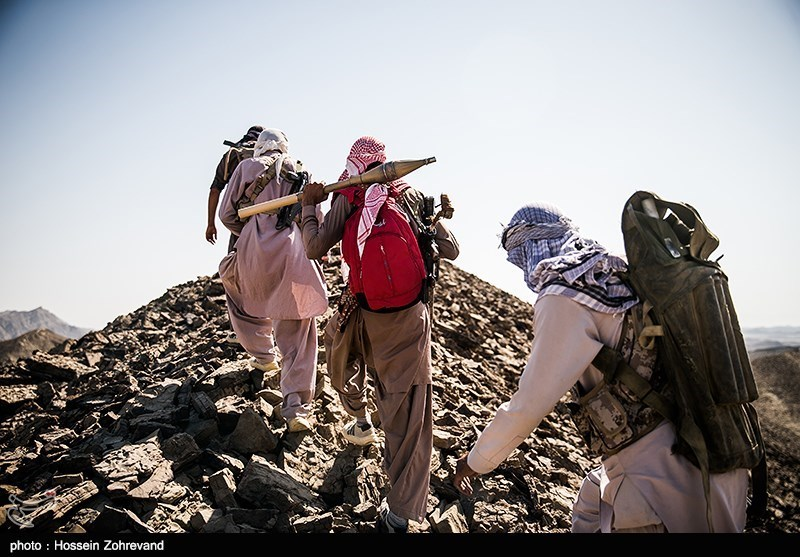
A group of NAJA border guard rangers patrolling near the Iran-Pakistan border

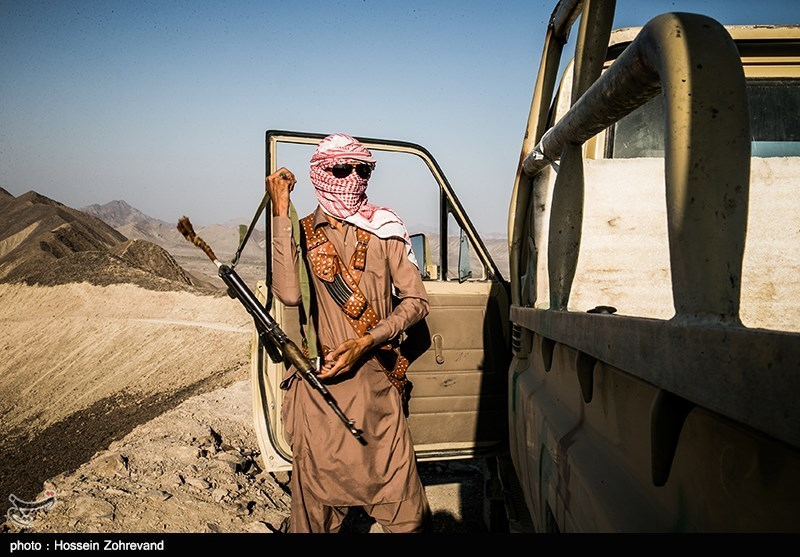
A NAJA border guard ranger on the Iran-Pakistan border

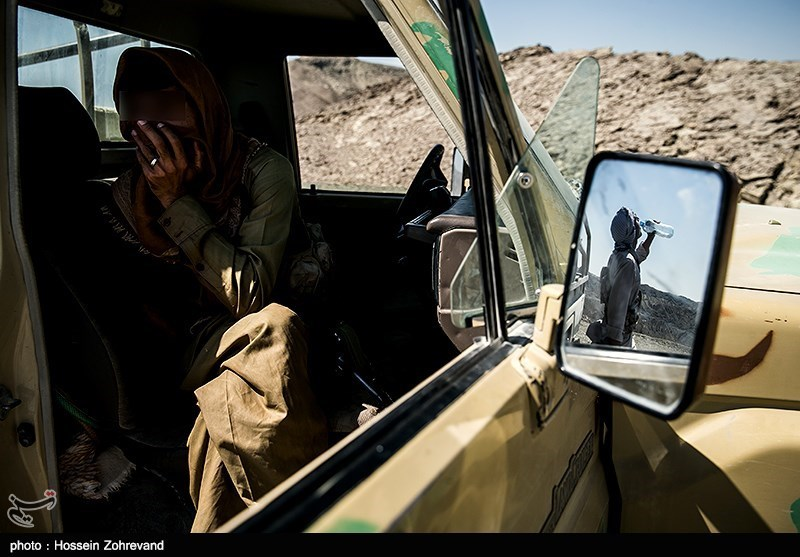
NAJA border guard rangers resting near the Iran-Pakistan border

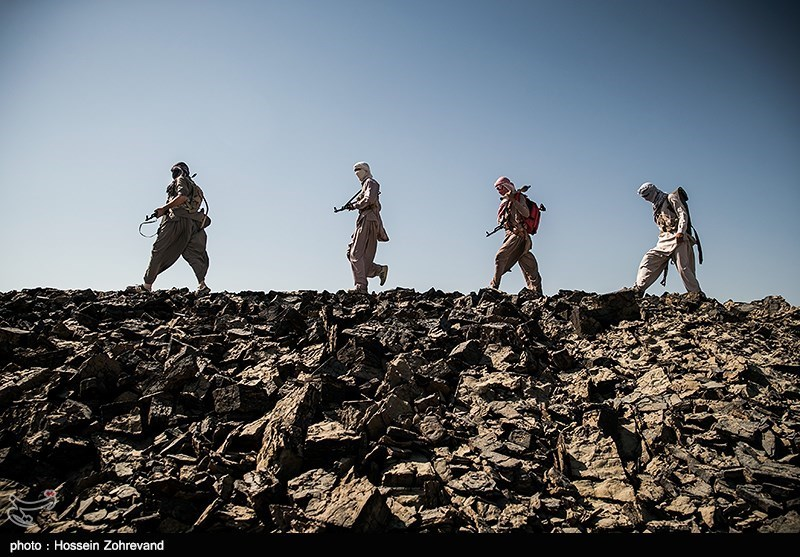
A group of NAJA border guard rangers patrolling on the Iran-Pakistan border

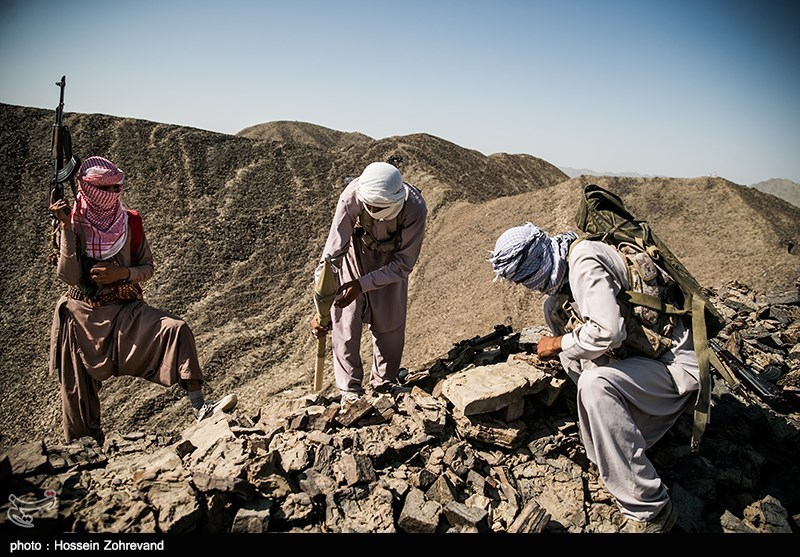
NAJA border guard rangers investigating on the Iran-Pakistan border

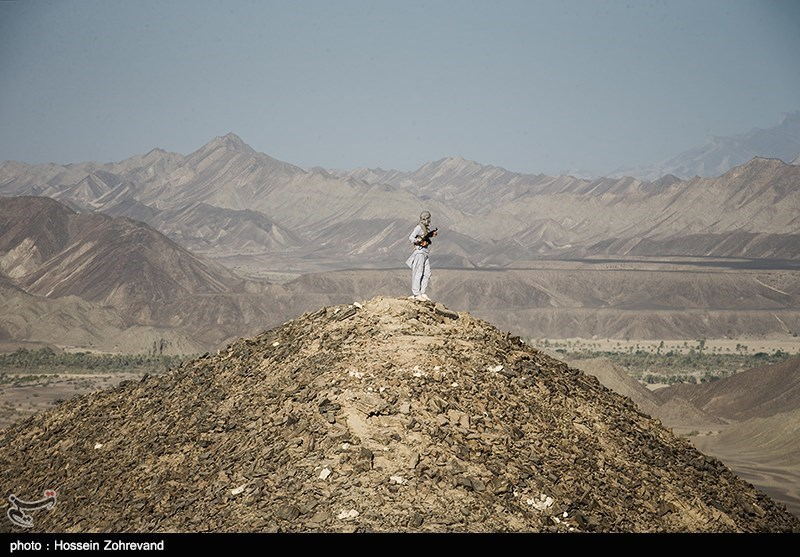
A NAJA border guard ranger on the Iran-Pakistan border keeping watch

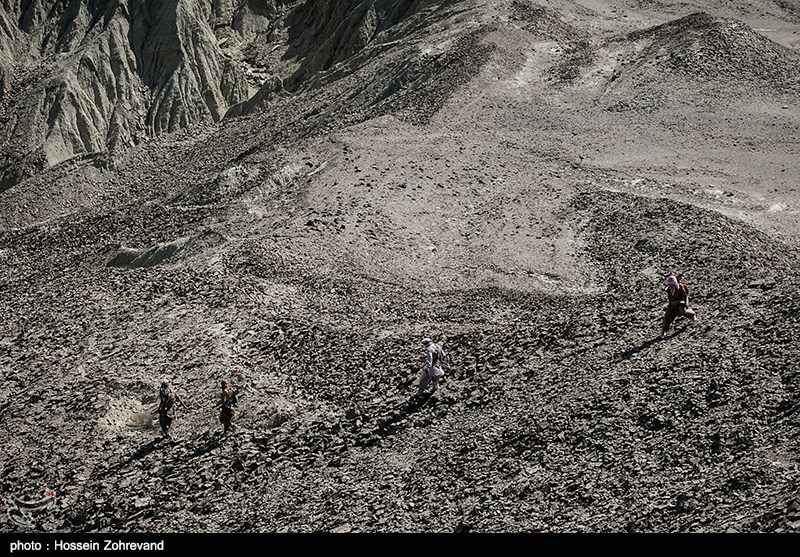
A group of NAJA border guard rangers patrolling on the Iran-Pakistan border

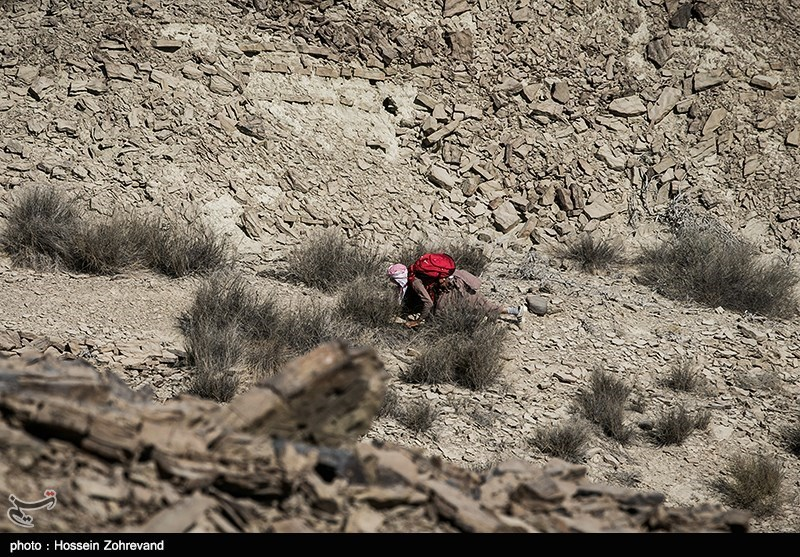
NAJA border guard rangers on A NAJA border guard ranger on the Iran-Pakistan border

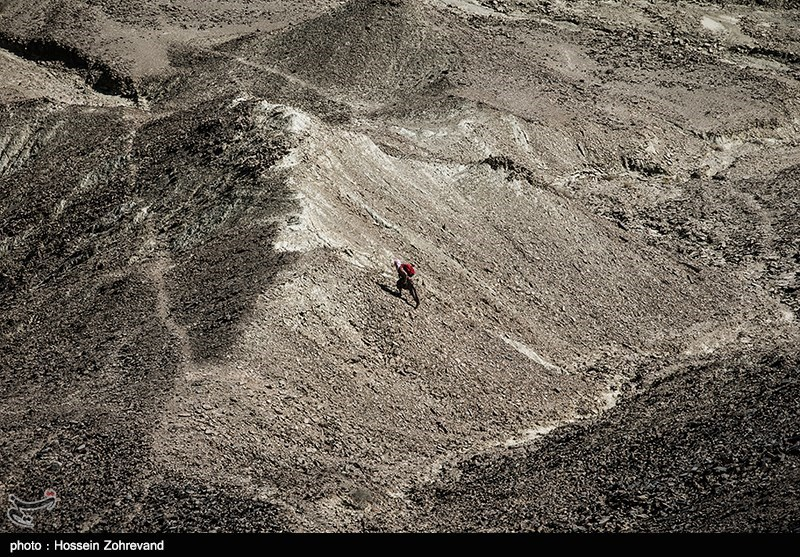
A NAJA border guard ranger on the Iran-Pakistan border climbing a mountain

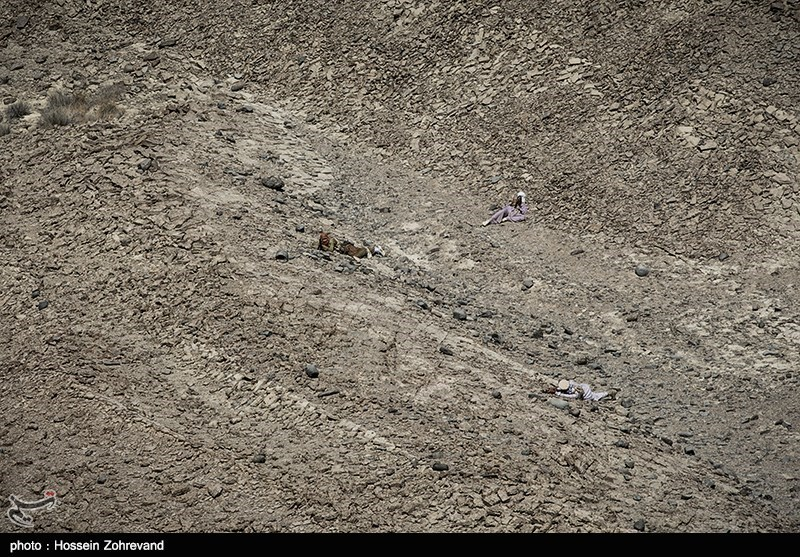
A NAJA border guard ranger on the Iran-Pakistan border climbing a mountain
