= Mohammad Nazar Azimi =

Iranian brigadier general (born 1960)

Sardar Mohammad Nazar Azimi
- محمدنظر عظیمی
- Born: Mohammad Nazar Azimi; March 21, 1960 (age 66); Kangavar, Kermanshah, Iran
- Military career
- Allegiance: Iran
- Branch: IRGC
- Rank: Brigadier General
- Unit: Ground Forces of the Army of the Guardians of the Islamic Revolution
- Commands: Kermanshah Nabi Akram Corps 8th Najaf Ashraf Division
- Conflicts: Iran–Iraq War

Mohammad Nazar Azimi (Persian: محمدنظر عظیمی, born 1960 in Kangavar) is a Brigadier general of the Islamic Revolutionary Guard Corps, currently the Commander of the 8th Najaf Ashraf Division and the senior commander of the Kermanshah Nabi Akram Corps, Hamadan, and Ilam provinces.

He began his military career in the Kermanshah IRGC after the 1979 Revolution and served as a member of the IRGC Ground Forces during the Iran–Iraq War.

After the war, Azimi was appointed to command the 29th Nabi Akram Brigade and served as the Commander of the 4th Division of the Besat from 2005 to 2008. He was the Commander of the Kermanshah Nabi Akram Corps from 2008 to 2014 and has been the Commander of the Najaf Ashraf Headquarters since December 2013. He was promoted to Brigadier General in 2016. In 2023, Azimi was issued sanctions by the United States, United Kingdom, and the European Union for human rights violations.

Military offices
Preceded by Ali Shadmani	Commander of 4th Division of the Besat	Formation of provincial armies
Preceded by Himself	Commander of Kermanshah Nabi Akram Corps	Succeeded by Bahman Reyhani
Preceded by Ali Shadmani	Najaf Ashraf Headquarters; 2013-present	Incumbent
