= Mohammad Karami =

Iranian brigadier general

Sardar Mohammad Karami
- محمد کرمی
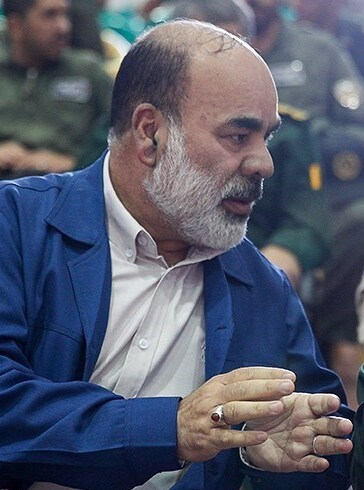
- Karami in 2023

Commander of the IRGC Ground Forces
- Incumbent
- Assumed office 19 June 2025
- President: Masoud Pezeshkian
- Supreme Leader: Ali Khamenei; Mojtaba Khamenei
- Preceded by: Mohammad Pakpour

Special Representative of the President for Executive Affairs of Sistan and Baluchestan
- In office 23 July 2023 – 22 October 2024
- President: Ebrahim Raisi; Mohammad Mokhber (Acting); Masoud Pezeshkian
- Supreme Leader: Ali Khamenei

Governor of Sistan and Baluchestan
- In office 22 December 2022 – 30 October 2024
- President: Ebrahim Raisi; Mohammad Mokhber (Acting); Masoud Pezeshkian
- Supreme Leader: Ali Khamenei
- Preceded by: Hossein Modarres Khiabani
- Succeeded by: Mansour Bijar

Commander Imam Hossein University
- In office 2024–2025
- President: Ebrahim Raisi; Mohammad Mokhber (Acting); Masoud Pezeshkian
- Supreme Leader: Ali Khamenei
- Preceded by: Noman Gholami
- Succeeded by: Reza Shaban

Personal details
- Born: 27 January 1966 (age 60) Lenjan, Isfahan, Pahlavi Iran

Military service
- Allegiance: Iran
- Branch/service: IRGC
- Years of service: 1980s–present
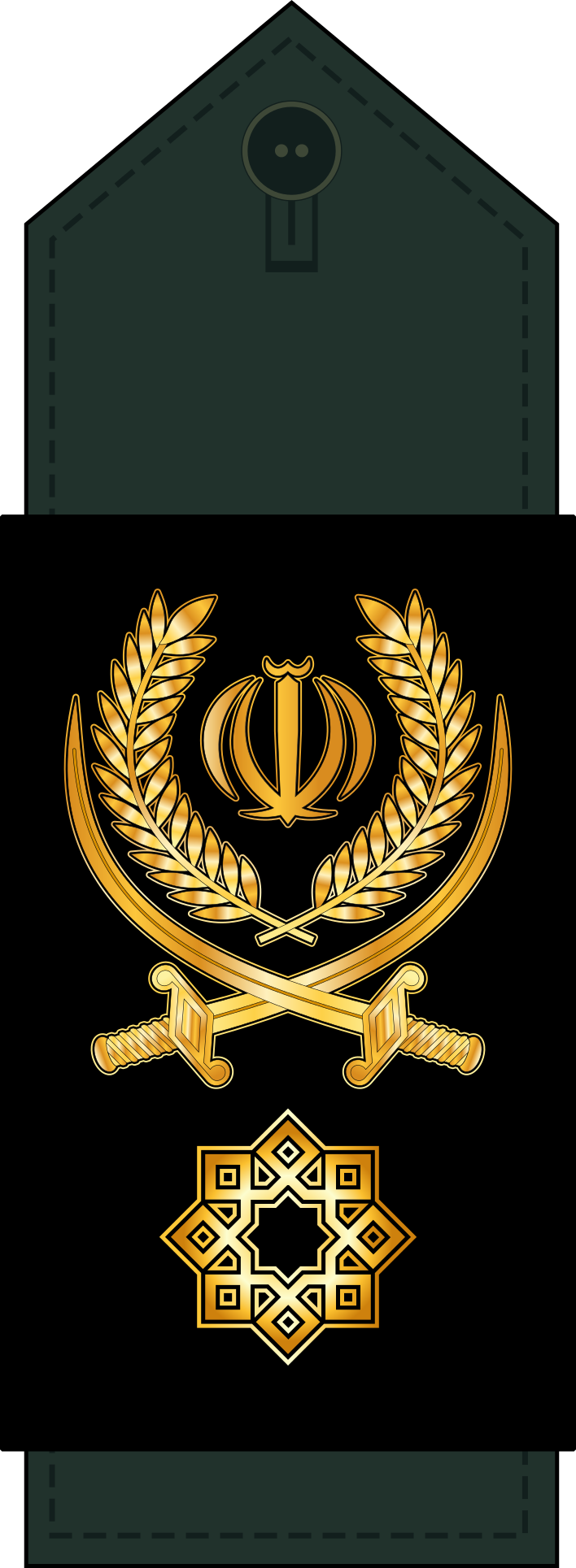
- Rank: Brigadier General
- Unit: Ground Forces
- Commands: Quds Headquarters (2019–2022)
- Battles/wars: Iran–Iraq War; Insurgency in Sistan and Balochistan; Twelve-Day War; 2026 Iran war

Mohammad Karami (Persian: محمد کرمی; born 27 January 1966) is a Brigadier General of the Islamic Revolutionary Guard Corps (IRGC), who has served as the Commander of the Islamic Revolutionary Guard Corps Ground Forces since June 2025.

He commanded the IRGC South-East Quds Headquarters Operational Base in Zahedan in Sistan and Baluchestan province from 2019 to 2022. He was linked to violent crackdowns and killings of protestors during the 2022 Mahsa Amini protests in Sistan and Baluchestan Province. Karami served as the Governor of Sistan and Baluchestan province in the Government of Ebrahim Raisi from 2022 to 2024. He has also served as the Commander of the Guards Officer of Imam Hossein University, which is affiliated with the IRGC, from 2024 to 2025.

== Sanctions ==
- United States: In 2020 on charges of human rights violations and responsibility for shooting at protesters during the November 2019 protests.
- Canada: In 2021, one month after the start of the Mahsa Amini protests in Iran, the Canadian government sanctioned Karami on charges of "gross human rights violations." Previously, the United States had placed him on its sanctions list.
- European Union: On 24 January 2023, the European Union issued new sanctions against the Islamic Republic of Iran, which included 18 natural and 19 legal entities of the Islamic Republic Iran, including Karami. This sanction is due to his role in the brutal suppression of protests after the Death of Mahsa Amini by the Islamic Republic.
- United Kingdom: On 20 February 2023, the British Foreign Office added the names of three judges, three members of the Revolutionary Guard Corps, and two governors, including Karami, to the sanctions list. These sanctions include asset freezes and a travel ban to the United Kingdom.
- Australia: On March 17, 2023, Australia added Karami to its Autonomous Sanctions list (under the thematic framework targeting serious human rights abuses in Iran).

== See also ==
- List of commanders of the Islamic Revolutionary Guard Corps

Military offices
Preceded by Mohammad Pakpour	Commander Islamic Revolutionary Guard Corps Ground Forces; 19 June 2025–present	Incumbent
Preceded by Noman Gholami	Commander Imam Hossein University; 2024–2025	Succeeded by Reza Shaban
Preceded by Mohammad Marani	Commander of Quds Headquarters; 2019–2022	Succeeded by Hassan Mortazavi Shahroudii
Political offices
Preceded by ?	Special Representative of the President for Executive Affairs of Sistan and Baluchestan; 23 July 2023–22 October 2024	Succeeded by ?
Preceded by Hossein Modarres Khiabani	Governor of Sistan and Baluchestan; 22 December 2022–30 October 2024	Succeeded by Mansour Bijar
