= Qadr (munition) =

Iranian surface to ground guided bomb

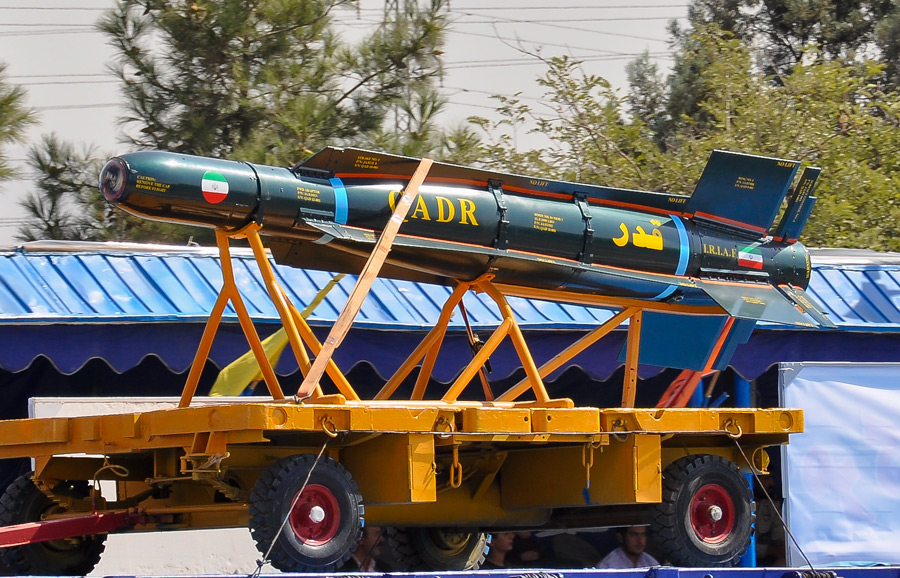

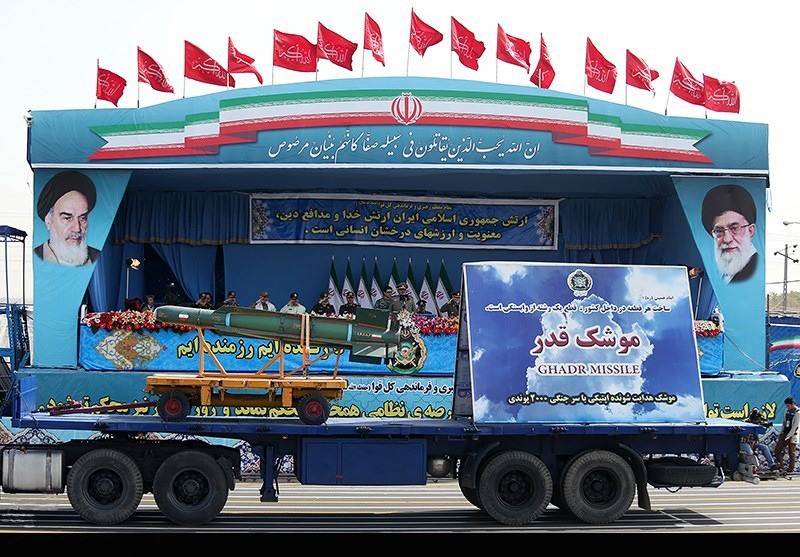
Qadr bomb

The 9A Qadr is an Iranian air to surface precision-guided munition (PGM). It is Iran's first generation of air-launched bomb. It was developed by the missile-manufacturing companies of the Iranian Ministry of Defence, not the well-established Aerospace Industries Organisation, who build Iran surface-to-surface guided weapons.

The GBU-67/9A Qadr is an unpowered Electro-Optically guided Glide-Bomb (EO GB), built around a 2,000 lb Mk 84 class bomb body. Both the Qadr and the Zoobin have been designed around standard US-pattern general-purpose bomb shapes, from existing IRIAF stocks. Both weapons have also been given US-style `GBU' and `AGM' designations, although the designers say that these numbers have no greater significance beyond inventory management and parts stocks.

== Operators ==
Iran

- Islamic Republic of Iran Air Force

== See also ==
- Islamic Republic of Iran Armed Forces
- Defense industry of Iran
- List of equipment of the Iranian Army
- Historical equipment of the Iranian Army
