= Mohammad Marani =

Iranian brigadier general (born 1963)

Sardar Mohammad Marani
- محمد مارانی
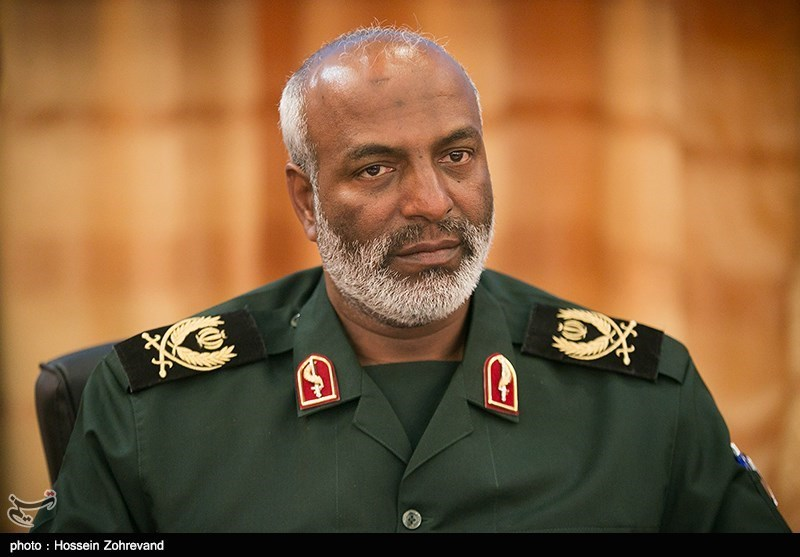
- Born: 1963 (age 62–63); Maran Qaleh, Jiroft, Iran
- Military career
- Allegiance: Revolutionary Guard
- Service years: 1982–present
- Rank: Brigadier General
- Commands: Imam Sajjad Corps Hormozgan; Quds Headquarters; Medina Headquarters
- Conflicts: Iran–Iraq War

Mohammad Marani (born 1963 in Maran Qaleh, Jiroft) is an Iranian brigadier general in the Islamic Revolutionary Guard Corps (IRGC) and now serves as the commander of the Madina Munawwara headquarters, acting as the senior IRGC commander in the provinces of Fars, Hormozgan, and Bushehr. He began his military career in 1982 with the IRGC Ground Forces. During the Iran–Iraq War, he commanded several battalions of the 41st Sarallah Division.

Between 2005 and 2006, Marani served as the commander of the 1st Seyyed al-Shuhada Brigade of the 41st Sarallah Division, and from 2006 to 2008, he was the deputy commander of the same division. In 2008, he briefly served as the coordinating deputy of the Sarallah Corps in Kerman, and later held the position of deputy commander of the Quds Base until 2011. From 2011 to 2014, he commanded the Imam Sajjad Corps in Hormozgan Province, and between 2014 and 2019, he served as the commander of the Quds Base. From March 2020 to November 30, 2025, Marani was the commander of the Medina Munawwarah base. He was promoted to the rank of brigadier general in 2016.
