= Jamana =

Kurdish traditional headgear

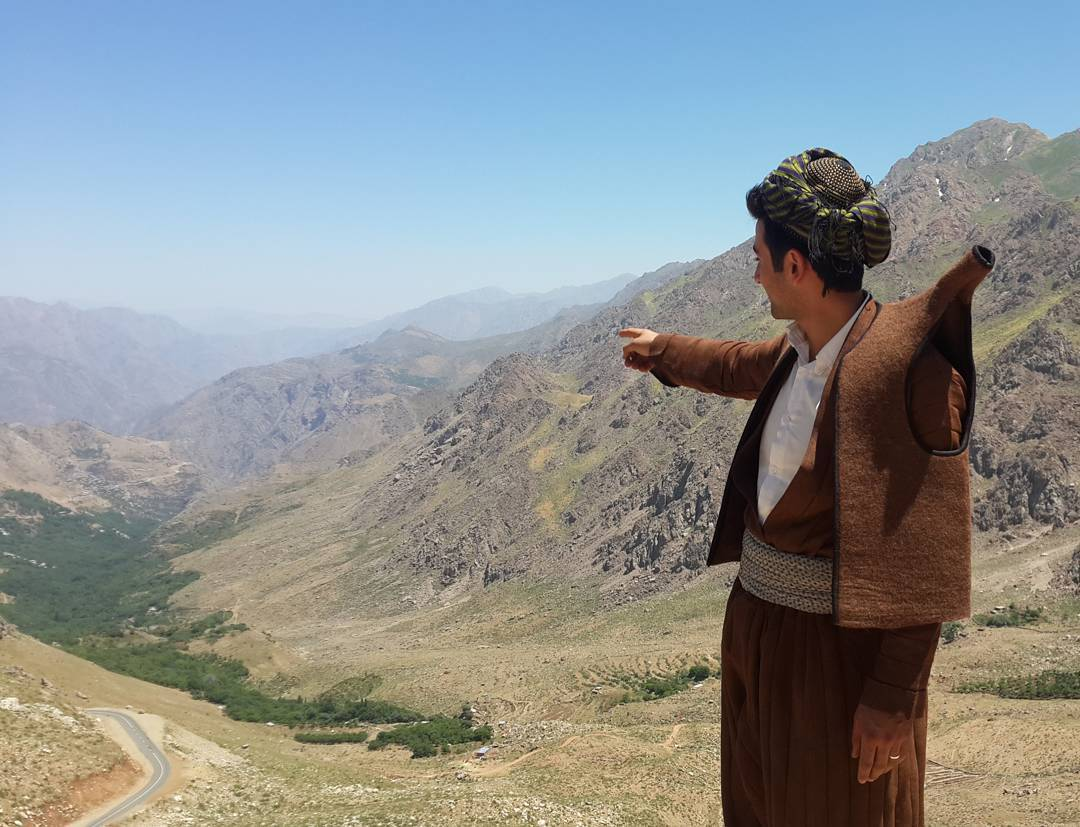
- A Hawrami Kurd in traditional Kurdish clothing, wearing a Jamana on his head, from Iranian Kurdistan
- Type: Headgear
- Material: Cotton
- Place of origin: Kurdistan
- Introduced: 3000/2000 BC

Jamana (Kurdish: جامانە, romanized: Camane, Kurdish pronunciation: [ʤaː.maː.na]) also known as Jamadani (Kurdish: جەمەدانی, romanized: Cemedanî), or Aghabanu (Kurdish: ئاغابانوو, romanized: Axabanû), (Note: Other names: Mezar (Kurdish: مێزەر, romanized: Mêzer) Meshki (Kurdish: مشکی, romanized: Mişikî) Sarpech (Kurdish: سەرپێچ, romanized: Serpêç) Sarushada (Kurdish: سەر و شەدە, romanized: Ser u Şede) Kavink (Kurdish: کەڤینک, romanized: Kevînk) Yalgh (Kurdish: یاڵخ, romanized: Yalix) Yashmagh (Kurdish: یەشماخ, romanized: Yeşimax)) is a traditional Kurdish headgear, and forms a complete part of Kurdish clothing. It was first used in Mesopotamia by the Sumerians. In the Pahlavi language, the term refers to a piece of cloth that has not yet been sewn.

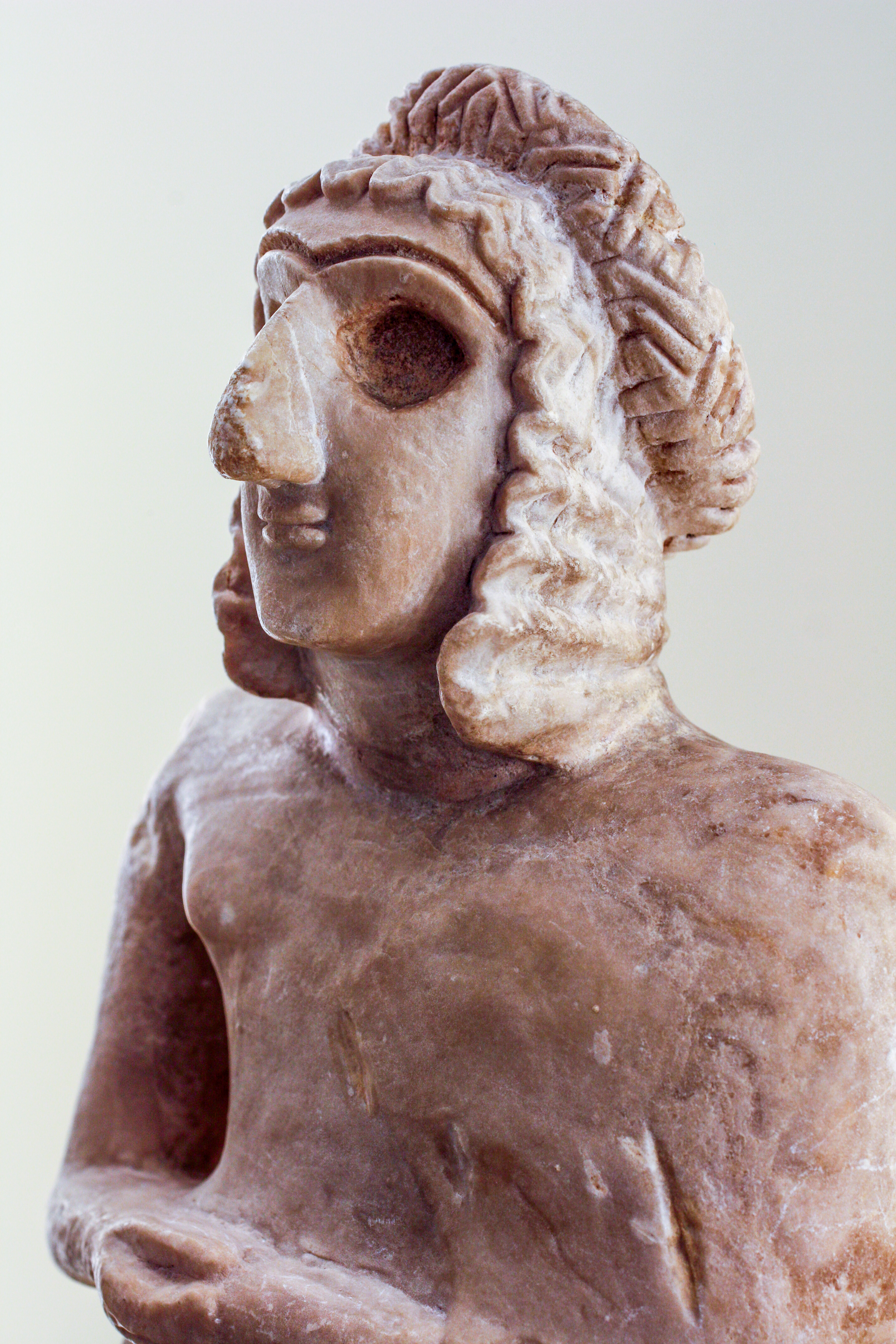
A Sumerian portrait statuette of a woman wearing headgear.

Jamana is mostly worn by men, while another version is worn by women as shirts or fashion towels.

== Traditional use ==
On certain occasions, particularly during Newroz celebrations in Iranian Kurdistan, individuals wearing Jamana have reportedly faced persecution by Iranian intelligence agencies. Among Iranian Kurds, Newroz is often referred to as Newrozî Camane (Kurdish: نەورۆزی جامانە, lit. 'The Newroz of Jamana').

According to a report by the Ministry of Endowments and Religious Affairs of the Kurdistan Region, more than 100 mosques in the Kurdistan Region have been built in the Kurdish Jamana style. Jamana, in addition to its common use, is also used to protect the head from sunburn and to keep it cool. During past Iraqi–Kurdish conflicts, Jamana was part of the official Peshmerga fighting uniform.

Due to changing circumstances, wearing the Jamana has become less common. However, the new generation wear it around their necks, using it as a fashion accessory.

== Types and ways of wearing ==
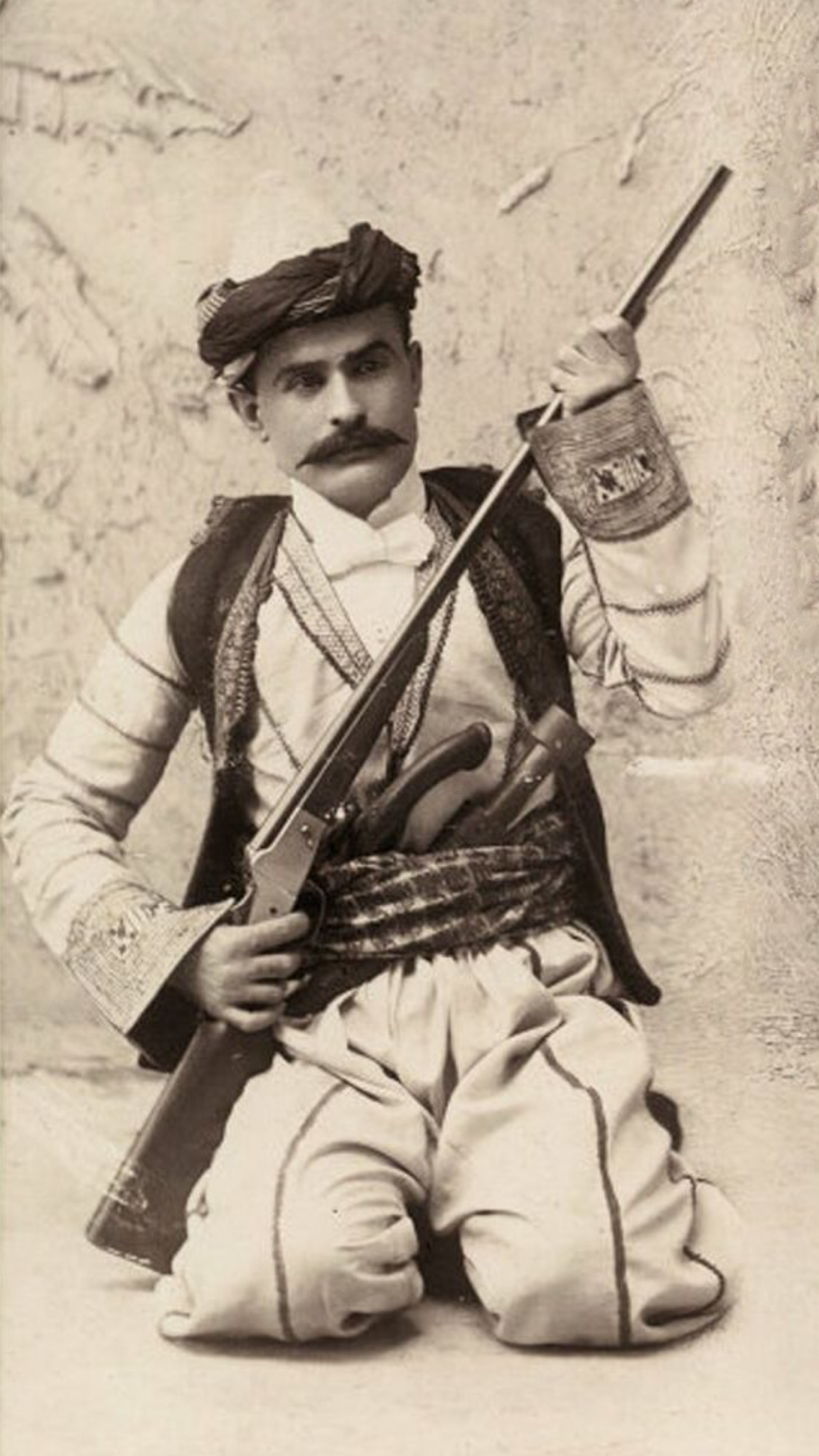
A Kurd from Urmia, wearing a Kurdish headgear (Jamana)

Jamana has many different styles across the Kurdish regions. The colors of Jamana are usually black and white, or red and white. The black and white Jamana is used by Kurds of the Zebari, Harki, and Doski tribes. The red and white Jamana is used by the Barzani tribes and Yazidi Kurds.

Jamana is worn in various ways and styles, It can be worn in any way the wearer chooses; However, there are generally two main styles of wearing it:

- Xaw u Pan (raw and wide), loosely placed over a Klaw.
- Luldraw (rolled), tightly wrapped around the Klaw.

The head-dress consists first of a small ornamented skullcap called Klaw, over which the Jamana is placed. It hangs behind and is often wrapped once around the neck. The traditional Kurdish headgear has been replaced by a long, thick cord with pieces of black cloth attached to it in close contact, resembling a "boa". This element, known as the pushin, is wrapped around the head over the Jamana. The overall costume is considered graceful and dignified, especially when worn by tall individuals, such as many women from Sulaymaniyah; including notable figures like Lady Adela and Hapsa Khan.

Contemporary designers currently recreate Jamana in more modern styles, excluding the traditional form.

== Klaw ==
The Klaw (Note: Kurdish: کڵاو, romanized: Killaw) (skullcap) is a circular object approximately the size of a man's head and serves as an essential base for wearing the Jamana. Without the Klaw, the Jamana cannot be properly worn.
