= 110th Salman Farsi Special Operations Brigade =

- تیپ نیروی مخصوص ۱۱۰ سلمان فارسی
- Insignia of Iran's Islamic Revolutionary Guard Corps Takavar Special Forces
- Active: 1986–present
- Country: Iran
- Allegiance: Supreme Leader of Iran
- Branch: Ground Force
- Type: Takavar
- Role: Special operations
- Size: Brigade (between 6000 and 8000 members)
- Part of: Islamic Revolutionary Guard Corps
- Garrison/HQ: Zahedan, Sistan and Baluchestan province
- Engagements: Iran–Iraq War; Sistan and Baluchestan insurgency Syrian Civil War

Commanders
- Current commander: Brigadier General Hossein Almasi

The 110th Salman Farsi Special Operations Brigade (Persian: تیپ نیروی مخصوص ۱۱۰ سلمان فارسی, romanized: Tip-e Niru-ye Makhsus-e 110 Salmān-e Fārsi) is an SOF Takavar unit of the Islamic Revolutionary Guard Corps Ground Forces based in the city of Zahedan, in the province of Sistan and Baluchistan. The brigade is currently commanded by Brigadier General Hossein Almasi (Persian: حسین الماسی) and part of the "Qods sector headquarters" in southeastern Iran.

== History ==
The brigade originated in 1986 as a battalion of the 41st Tharallah Division, taking part in the Iran-Iraq war. After the war, it became its own brigade in 2011, and in 2015, following necessary special training, the brigade was declared a special operations Takavar brigade. Since then, it has taken part in combating the insurgency in Sistan and Baluchistan province from its base in the city of Zahedan, as well as partaking in the Iranian involvement in the Syrian civil war.

=== Assassination attempts ===
==== April 2017 ====
On 10 April 2017, reports emerged that two gunman with unclear organizational affiliation had assassinated Ruhollah A’ali, a battalion commander in the 110th brigade. The two gunman were reportedly killed by Basij fighters in the ensuing combat. While the identity of the perpetrators was not disclosed, the Islamic State had released a video threatening Iranian forces only days prior, leading some to speculate that they were responsible for the attack.

==== April 2022 ====
On 23 April 2022, the Qods sector headquarters announced that 4 gunmen had ambushed the car of 110th brigade commander Hossein Almasi at a military checkpoint near Zahedan, killing one of his bodyguards named Mahmoud Absalan but failing to assassinate the commander. While blame for the assassination attempt was not officially put on any party, some held the Mossad responsible for the attack, connecting it to the Iranian Police's claimed arrest of 3 spies working for the Mossad 3 days prior.

== See also ==
- Special forces of Iran
- Saberin Takavar Brigade
- 33rd Al-Mahdi Airborne Brigade
