= Meraj 113 =

Meraj UAV
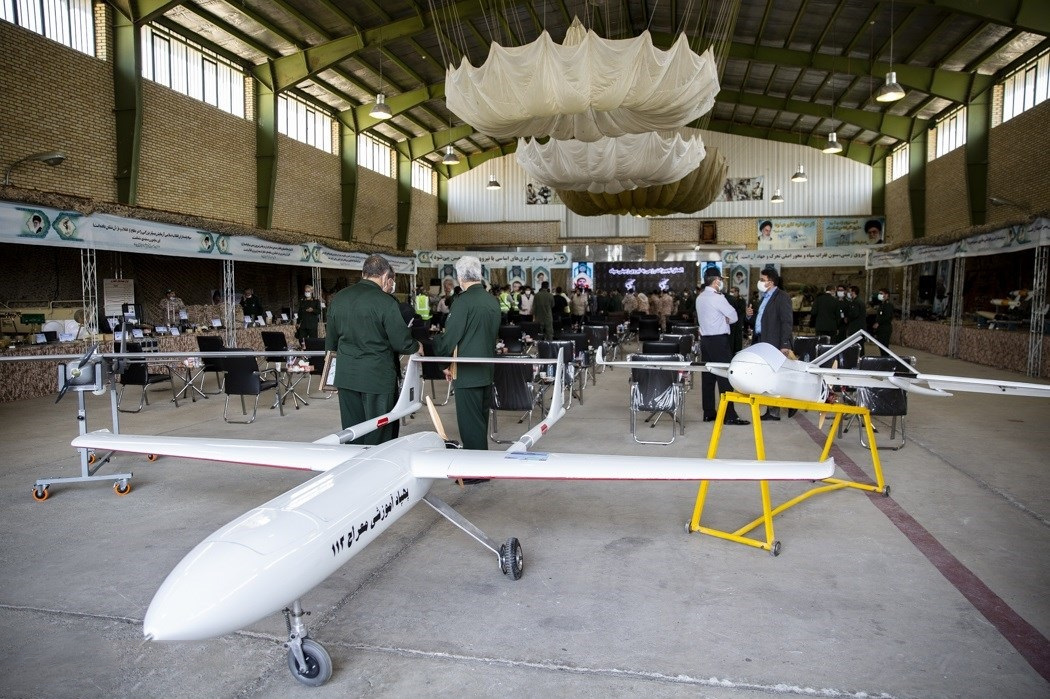
- The Meraj is the drone on the right in this photo.

General information
- Type: UAV
- National origin: Iran
- Manufacturer: Ground Forces of the Islamic Revolutionary Guard Corps
- Designer: HESA
- Status: In service
- Primary user: Iran
- Number built: Not Mentioned

The Meraj 113 is a training drone designed and produced by the Islamic Revolutionary Guard Corps Ground Forces and is the first drone specifically designed for training drone pilots. The design of this drone was based on the Mohajer 6, Ababil 3, and Mohajer 2 drones and took 4 months to design.

The Meraj 113 has an operational range of 150 kilometers, a speed of 120 kilometers per hour, a flight altitude of 18,000 feet, a flight duration of 3 hours, and can take off from the ground with a weight of 50 kilograms.
