= Mohammad Pakpour =

Iranian military officer and commander of the IRGC (1961–2026)

Sardar Mohammad Pakpour
- محمد پاکپور
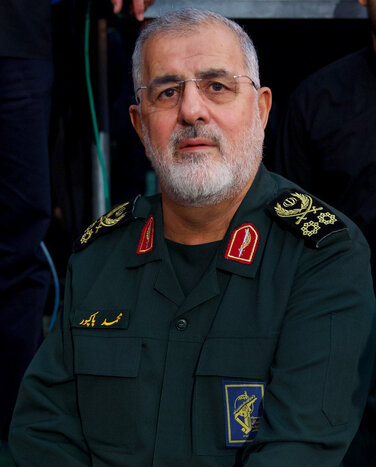
- Pakpour in 2025

7th Commander-in-Chief of the Islamic Revolutionary Guard Corps
- In office 13 June 2025 – 28 February 2026
- President: Masoud Pezeshkian
- Supreme Leader: Ali Khamenei
- Preceded by: Hossein Salami
- Succeeded by: Ahmad Vahidi

Commander of the IRGC Ground Forces
- In office 29 April 2009 – 19 June 2025
- President: Mahmoud Ahmadinejad; Hassan Rouhani; Ebrahim Raisi; Mohammad Mokhber (acting); Masoud Pezeshkian
- Supreme Leader: Ali Khamenei
- Preceded by: Mohammad Jafar Asadi
- Succeeded by: Mohammad Karami

Deputy Commander for Operations of the Islamic Revolutionary Guard Corps
- In office 2008–2009
- President: Mahmoud Ahmadinejad
- Supreme Leader: Ali Khamenei
- Preceded by: Ali Fazli
- Succeeded by: Mohsen Kazemi

Deputy Coordinator of the Islamic Revolutionary Guard Corps Ground Forces
- In office 2003–2005
- President: Mohammad Khatami
- Supreme Leader: Ali Khamenei
- Preceded by: ?
- Succeeded by: Hamid Aslani

Personal details
- Born: 2 June 1961 Arak, Pahlavi Iran
- Died: 28 February 2026 (aged 64) Tehran, Iran
- Cause of death: Assassination By Airstrike
- Awards: Order of Fath (1st class)

Military service
- Allegiance: Iran
- Branch/service: IRGC
- Years of service: 1979–2026
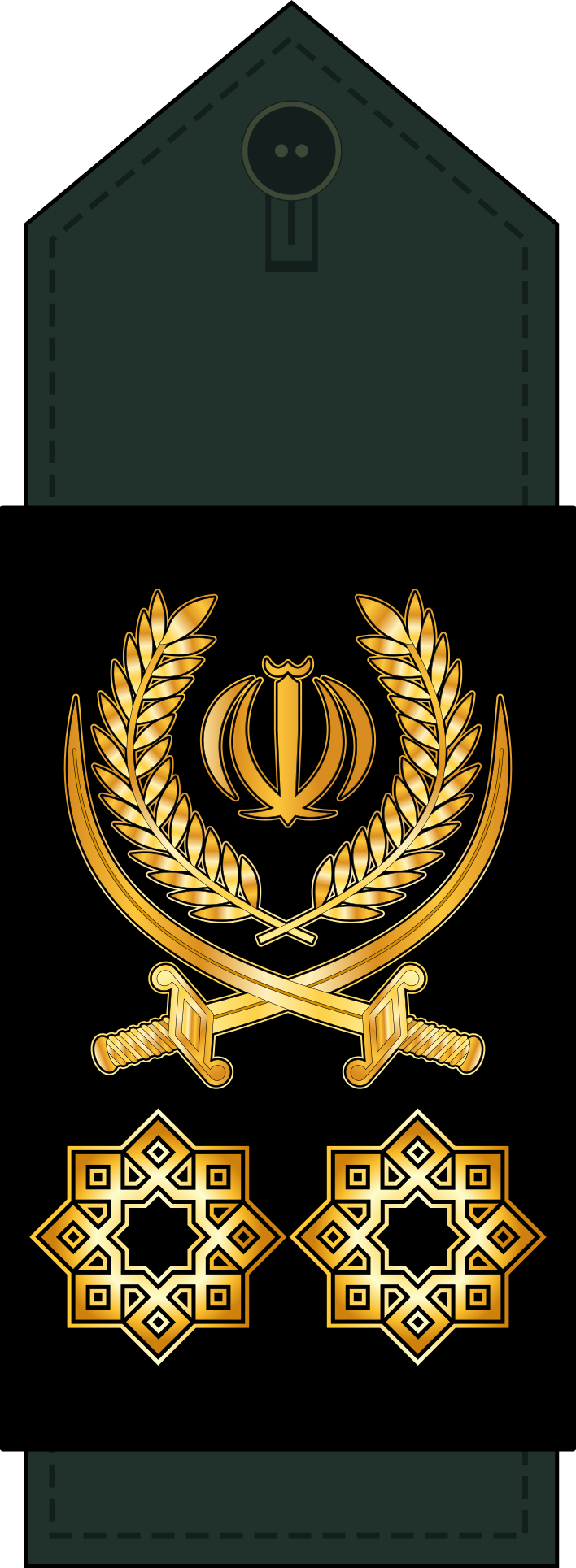
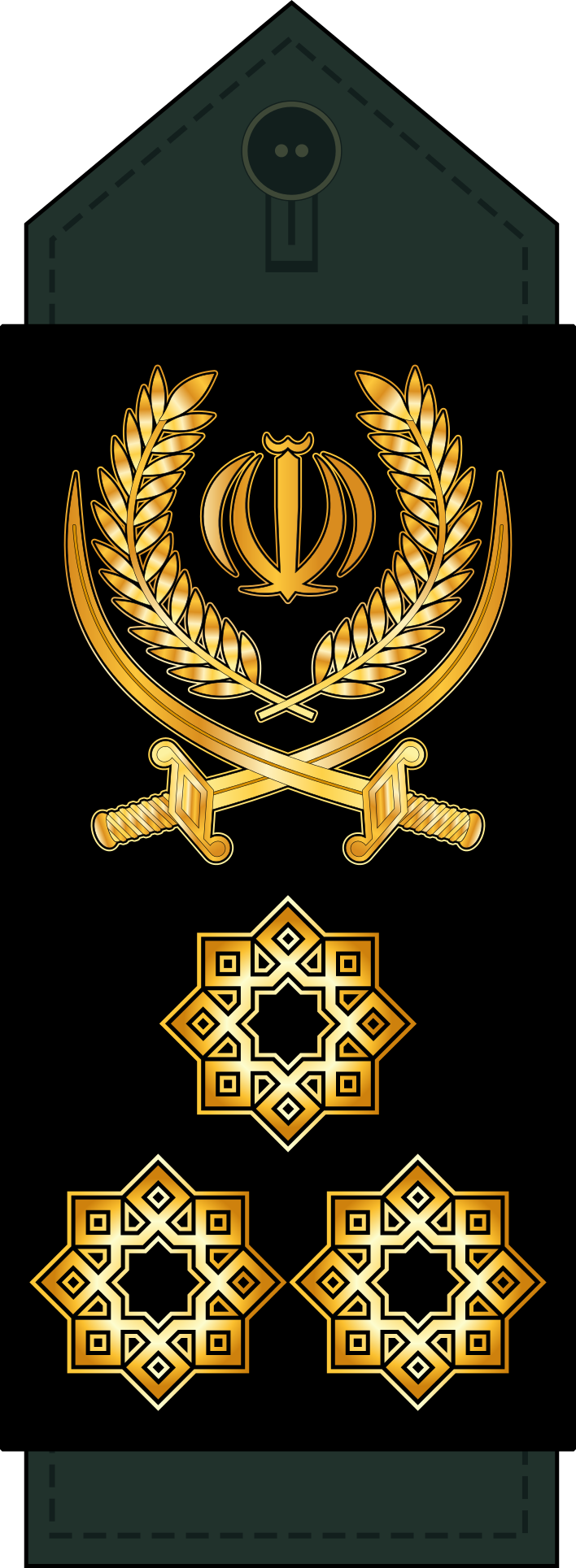
- Rank: Major General; Lieutenant General (posthumously)
- Unit: Ground Forces
- Commands: 31st Ashura Division (2000–2003); 8th Najaf Ashraf Division (1997–2000)
- Battles/wars: 1979 Kurdish rebellion; Iran–Iraq War; Insurgency in Sistan and Balochistan; Syrian civil war; Iranian intervention in Syria; War in Iraq (2013–2017); Iranian intervention in Iraq; Third Battle of Fallujah; Iran–PJAK conflict; Western Iran clashes; 2017 Tehran attacks; Twelve-Day War; 2026 Iran war X

Mohammad Pakpour (Persian: محمد پاکپور; 2 June 1961 – 28 February 2026) was an Iranian military officer who served as the commander of the Islamic Revolutionary Guard Corps (IRGC) from 2025 until his death in 2026. He had previously commanded the IRGC Ground Forces.

He was appointed IRGC commander on 13 June 2025 following the death of his predecessor Hossein Salami during the Twelve-Day War. Following his promotion, Mohammad Karami succeeded him as commander of the Ground Forces.

On 28 February 2026, he was killed in the Iran war.

== Military career ==
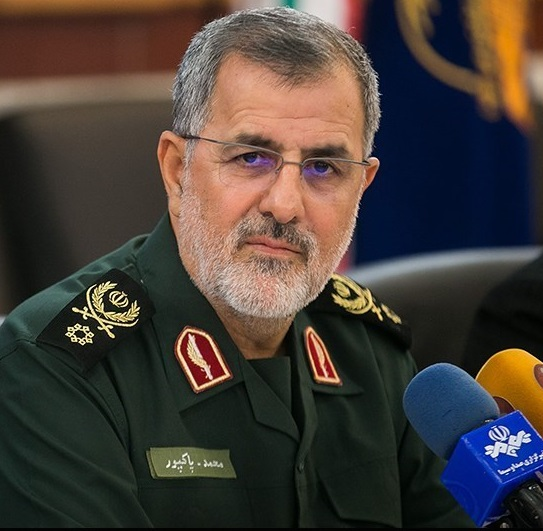
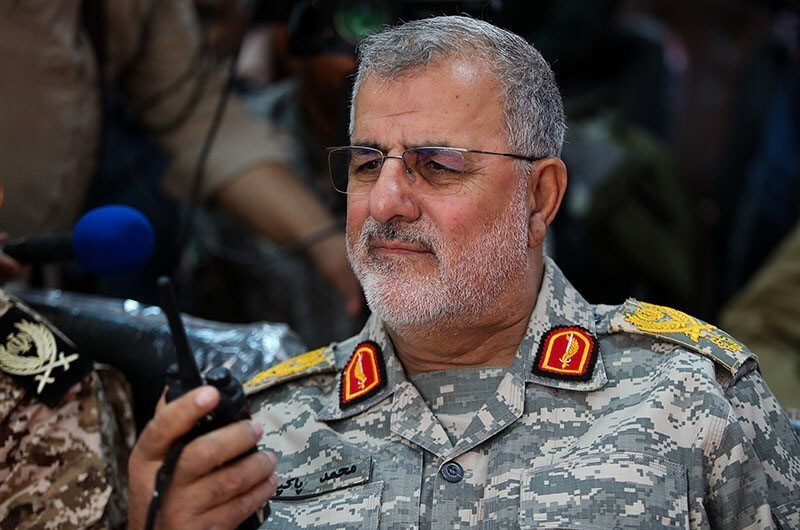
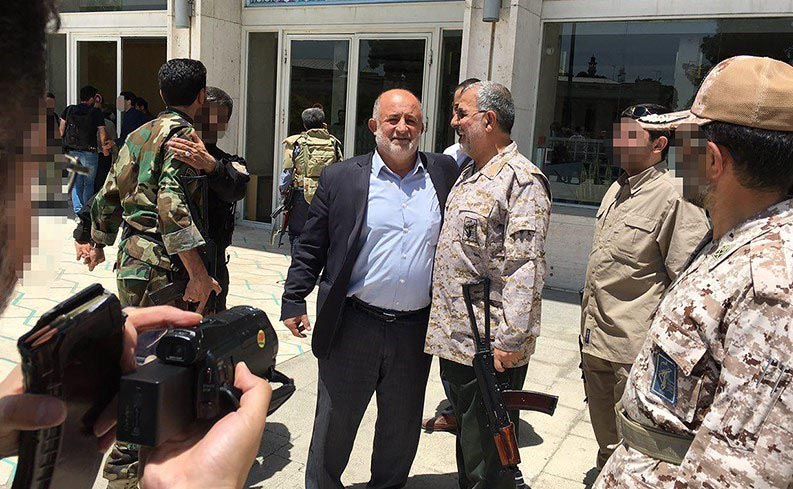
Clockwise from the top
- Pakpour in 2016 speaking to the Iranian press
- Pakpour at the 2022 IRGC Ground Forces exercise in Aras region
- Pakpour (center, holding a rifle), after special forces killed the ISIS perpetrators of the 2017 Tehran attacks.

Pakpour joined the Islamic Revolutionary Guard Corps (IRGC) in the wake of the Iranian Revolution in 1979. He served during the 1979 Kurdish rebellion in Iran and the eight-year-long Iran–Iraq War. His responsibilities included five years of Army Operations Command, commander of the 8th Najaf Ashraf Division, commander of 31st Ashura Division of Command chief Army's Northern Command headquarters. Among his duties were fighting terrorism in northwest Iran, establishing security in southeast Iran, and overseeing specialized exercises.

According to Pakpour, the IRGC sought to promote the security of the region through new military tactics.

He believed that drones like Hemaseh helped keep the Islamic Revolutionary Guard Corps on their toes and showed the consistency and preparedness of the force.

In 2017, commandos of Iran's elite Saberin Unit special forces, under Pakpour's direct command, were responsible for neutralizing ISIS terrorists during the 2017 Tehran attacks.

=== Participation in Third Battle of Fallujah ===
In 2016, Pakpour was pictured alongside Qasem Soleimani directing the IRGC forces in the Third Battle of Fallujah against the Islamic State. It was believed to be the first time he was seen directing operations in either Iraq or Syria. According to The Long War Journal, "His presence in Fallujah underscores the importance of operations in Iraq to the IRGC's leadership".

== Sanctions ==
On 24 June 2019, the U.S. Treasury Department sanctioned him, freezing any of his U.S. assets and banning U.S. persons from doing business with him. He was also sanctioned by the European Union, Australia, Japan, and Canada for his involvement with the IRGC and its wider operations. Although these sanctions were temporarily lifted following the 2015 nuclear agreement, they were reinstated after the United States withdrew from the deal.

== Death ==
On 28 February 2026, the Israel Defense Forces announced that Pakpour had been killed in the 2026 Iran war. This was later confirmed by Iranian state media IRNA.

== See also ==
- List of Iranian two-star generals since 1979
- List of Iranian officials killed during the 2026 Iran war

Military offices
Preceded by Hossein Salami	Commander of the Revolutionary Guards; 13 June 2025 – 28 February 2026	Succeeded by Ahmad Vahidi
Preceded by Mohammad Jafar Asadi	Commander of Ground Forces of the Islamic Revolutionary Guard Corps; 29 April 2009–19 June 2025	Succeeded by Mohammad Karami
Preceded by Ali Fazli	Deputy Commander for Operations of the Islamic Revolutionary Guard Corps; 2008–2009	Succeeded by Mohsen Kazemi
Preceded by ?	Deputy Coordinator of the Islamic Revolutionary Guard Corps Ground Forces; 2003–2005	Succeeded by Hamid Aslani
Preceded by Yazdan Moayyadinia	Commander of the 31st Ashura Division; 2000–2003	Succeeded by Ali Akbar Nouri
Preceded by ?	Commander of the 8th Najaf Ashraf Division; 1997–2000	Succeeded by Mehdi Kelishadi
