= Special forces of Iran =

Units in the armed forces and police

This is a list of special forces units in Iranian Armed Forces and Police.

The name can refer to members of regular units who have successfully completed commando or ranger training courses and marines trained as frogman, or the hand-selected and highly trained members serving in special forces.

== Terminology ==
Niruye vizheh (نیروی ویژه), plural niruhaye vizheh (نیروهای ویژه) is the Persian term for "special force". This term is used in the official name for the 65th Airborne Special Forces Brigade.

The Qualification tab for Iranian Rangers

Takavar (تکاور), plural Takavaran (تکاوران), literally meaning "attack-trooper", is the equivalent of "commando". The word "Commando" (کماندو) is also used in Persian. The term "Ranger" (رنجر) is also used in some Army units.

Tofangdārān-e daryyi (تفنگداران دریائی) or takavaran-e daryayi (تکاوران دریایی) means "marines".

The word havabord (هوابرد) is used to refer to an airborne unit.

== Takavar units ==
=== Islamic Revolutionary Guard Corps ===
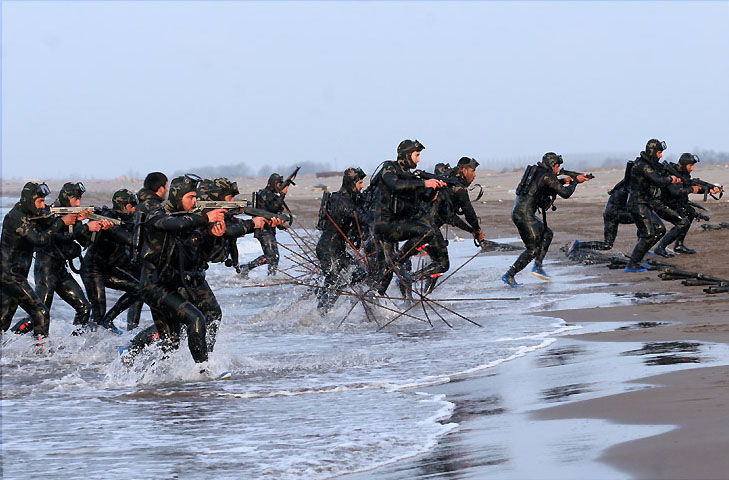
Takavar unit S.N.S.F. in Great Prophet IX maneuver, 25–27 February 2015

In the Islamic Revolutionary Guard Corps, one of its five branches, the elite Quds Force specialises in extraterritorial operations. In the Ground Forces, the Saberin Battalions (containing the Saberin Takavor Brigade, 110th Salman Farsi Special Operations Brigade, and the 33rd Al-Mahdi Airborne Brigade) are the most famous special units.

The Navy has its own Special Units of marines.

=== Army ===
Ground Forces

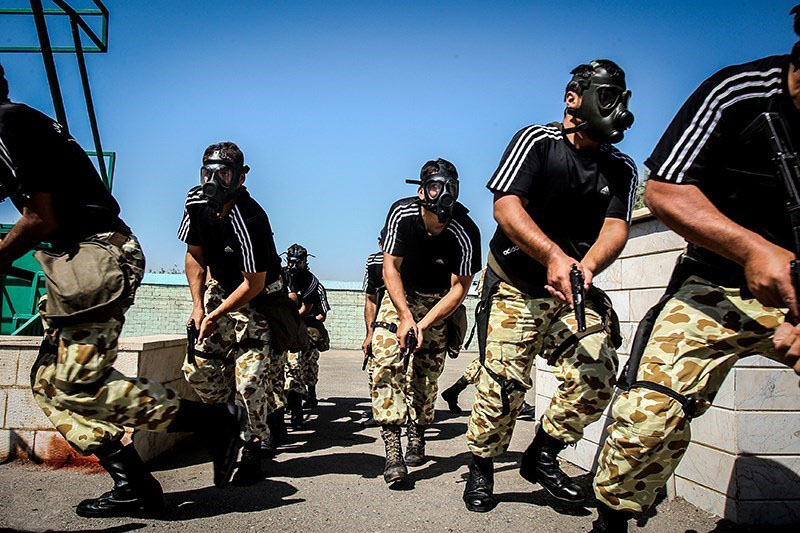
The Hostage Rescue Unit of NOHED practicing

Ground Forces of Islamic Republic of Iran Army units whose members are trained at Lashkarak Takavar Training Centre:

- 23rd Takavar Division based in Parandak
- 58th Takavar Division (Zolfaghar Division) based in Shahroud
- 25th Takavar Brigade based in Pasveh
- 35th Takavar Brigade based in Kermanshah
- 45th Takavar Brigade based in Shushtar
- 55th Airborne Brigade based in Shiraz
- 65th Airborne Special Forces Brigade (NOHED Brigade) based in Tehran

=== Navy ===
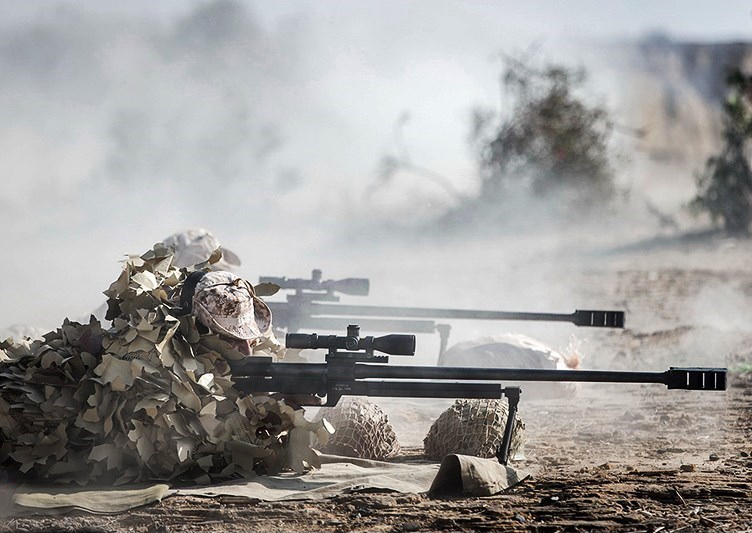
Navy marine snipers wearing ghillie suit, equipped with Sayyad (Steyr HS .50)

Islamic Republic of Iran Navy marines (Persian: تکاوران دریایی) whose members are trained at Manjil Takavar Training Centre:

- 1st Marine Brigade (Imam Hossein Brigade) based in Bandar Abbas
- 2nd Marine Brigade (Hazrat Rasul-i-Akram Brigade) based in Bushehr
- 3rd Marine Brigade (Hamza Sayyid-ush-Shuhda Brigade) based in Konarak

During the reign of the last Shah (king) of Iran, much of the naval training was created by members of the Soviet Union's Spetsnaz and the British Special Boat Service. Training is at least a 12-month process. After the recruit demonstrated the minimum physical requirements, he is sent to a collection of schools.

=== Police ===
In the Law Enforcement Force of Islamic Republic of Iran, special forces are known as Yegan Vijeh (Persian: يگان ويژه). The Anti-Terror Special Force (NOPO) is the most elite unit within the force.

== See also ==
- List of military special forces units
