= Islamic Revolutionary Guard Corps Ground Forces =

Land service branch of Iran's Islamic Revolutionary Guard Corps

- نیروی زمینی سپاه پاسداران انقلاب اسلامی
- Founded: Actual: 1980; 46 years ago Official: 17 September 1985 (40 years ago)
- Country: Iran
- Allegiance: Islamic Republic of Iran
- Branch: Land force
- Size: ≈150,000 (2020)
- Part of: Islamic Revolutionary Guard Corps
- Engagements: Iran–Iraq War; KDPI insurgency (1989–1996); War in Afghanistan (2001–2021); 2001 uprising in Herat; Insurgency in Sistan and Balochistan; Syrian civil war; Iranian intervention in Syria; War in Iraq (2013–2017); Iranian intervention in Iraq; Iran–PJAK conflict; Western Iran clashes; 2024 Iran–Israel conflict; Twelve-Day War; 2026 Iran war

Commanders
- Commander: BG Mohammad Karami
- Deputy Commander: BG Rouhollah Nouri
- Chief of Staff: SBG Ahmad Akhavan Mahdavi

Insignia
- Flag

- Flag of armored units

The Islamic Revolutionary Guard Corps Ground Forces (Persian: نیروی زمینی سپاه پاسداران انقلاب اسلامی, romanized: Niroye Zamini Sepah Pasdaran Enghalab Eslami), acronymed NEZSA (Persian: نزسا), are the ground forces of the Islamic Revolutionary Guard Corps (IRGC). The IRGC Ground Forces are more geared towards internal disorder than the regular Iranian Army. However, in recent years, the IRGC Ground Forces — and by extension the entire IRGC — have transitioned to become an expeditionary force, capable of projecting power abroad through conventional military operations or via proxies and unconventional warfare. There are at least around 150,000 IRGC Ground Force troops.

Following this transition, the Ground Forces structure remains focused on brigade levels units, supported by armoured, air support (drone), artillery, intelligence and special forces formations.

== History ==
The Guardians of the Islamic Revolution Ground Forces was officially established on 5 May 1979. It was conceived as a popular militia force to monitor the remainders of the Shah's Artesh and defend the Islamic Revolution (such as against Nojeh coup plot). However, the official establishment followed several months of activity of the Revolutionary Guards.

According to Mohsen Rafiqdust, the establishment of and armed force tasked to secure the Revolution was proposed by Hujjat al-Islam Mohammad Montazeri, son of Ayatollah Hussein Ali Montazeri; Supreme Leader Ruhollah Khomeini ordered in February 1979 the establishment of such a force, which was established by Mohammad Montazeri itself and Ayatollah Mohammad Beheshti, leader of the Islamic Republican Party. Moshen Rafiqdust was charged with organizing the Revolutionary Guard and Abbas Duzduzani was the first Commander.

Between February and December 1979, the IRGC evolved from a loose militia into an armed force; In early days, IRGC units seemed to operate independently and in different capacities in different locations. In March 1979, a national command was established.

The mission of the Army of the Guardians of the Islamic Revolution accorded primacy to an internal security role, while at the same time pushing for the export of the Islamic Revolution: in the early days, the IRGC was responsible for both internal and external intelligence and security, which was carried out in conjunction with the prime minister's office; the alghare’eh, combat units, were involved in fighting enemy groups.

Initially, the Army of the Guardians of the Islamic Revolution operated in coordination with Komitehs and their command echelon, but with an official approval.

In the aftermath of the official establishment of the Army of the Guardians of the Islamic Revolution, there were four factions within it; these factions were included in the Command and Central Councils, with the greatest influence exercised by the Mojahedin of the Islamic Revolution Organization. Members of the Mojahedin of the Islamic Revolution Organization in the IRGC used their positions against the People's Mujahedin of Iran, Tudeh and Fadai in the general campaign against the political left and ethnic minorities, where the left was strong. In September 1979, the IRGC were entrusted with providing security detail to Friday congregational prayer leader Ayatollah Montazeri, while failed to resist Iranian students in the seizure of the U.S. Embassy in Tehran. The 1979 Iranian constitution gave Khomeini the supreme command of all armed forces, including the IRGC.

In the wake of Iraq invasion of Iran in 1980, Islamic Republican Party (whose forces were led by the IRGC) and leftist organizations harshly confronted each other, resulting in thousands of casualties; the impeachment and removal of President Abolhassan Banisadr allowed the Islamic Republican Party to gain control of the defence strategy and to involve deeply the IRGC in it.

The Iran–Iraq war caused the IRGC to align closely with the clerical rule of the Islamic Republican Party; IRGC commander Mohsen Rezaee resigned from Mojahedin of the Islamic Revolution Organization due to the latter's contrast with the clerical rule. During the confrontation between Montazeri and President Akbar Hashemi Rafsanjani, hundreds were arrested from IRGC ranks. By 1988, the radical-leftist faction had vanished within the IRGC.

IRGC membership grew steadily in the first years of operation and during the Iran–Iraq War: by the end of 1979 there were about 10,000 guardsmen; in mid 1980 the number swelled to 25,000 and reached 50,000 by the end of 1981. In 1986 there were 350,000 guardsmen, organized into battalion-level units. The Iran–Iraq war forged the identities of the IRGC, Basij, and other associated organizations.

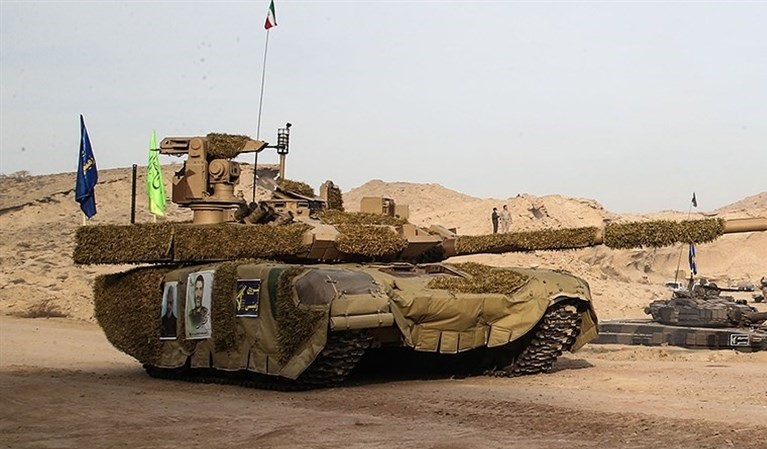
IRGC Ground Forces Karrar Tank, 2021

After the war, the Iranian leadership provided the IRGC new outlets of service. Some, external to the Basij, proposed their demobilization or their merger in the IRGC under the name of Resistance Guard. Instead of demobilizing IRGC and Basij, Iranian leadership maintained and expanded their mobilization, particularly in extra-military sectors.

In 1989, the IRGC lost its ministry and was merged with the Artesh in the Ministry of Defence and Armed Force Logistics as part of a Rafsanjani's policy aimed at reforming and consolidating the state control over governmental institutions. The IRGC even received a military ranks system. Between 1990 and 1995 the Basij Resistance Force was supported by new Supreme Leader Ali Khamenei against the Ground Forces of the Army of the Guardians of the Islamic Revolution in equipment allocations. The Basij supplanted the IRGC also in guarding sensitive buildings and installations.

However, Supreme Leader Khamanei managed to forge in the early 1990s a solid alliance with the Army of the Guardians of the Islamic Revolution; in the late 1990s, during the Mohammad Khatami's presidency, the IRGC provided the conservative faction considerable resources in the usage of force in combating perceived political threats.

During the presidency of Mahmoud Ahmadinejad (2005–2013), the IRGC was increased its influence in Middle East (in Lebanon but especially with Shiite stakeholders in Iraq), but also in Chavez's Venezuela. In 2009 Basij military responsibilities (including Basij military training) were transferred back to the Ground Forces of the Army of the Guardians of the Islamic Revolution in order to free the former and let it to concentrate on cultural struggle.

The Islamic Republic of Iran has been involved in active support to Syria since early stages of the Syrian Civil War; while the initial instrument of support was the Qods Force, Tehran subsequently deployed IRGC Ground Forces to Syria.

In 2017, Brigadier General Mohammad Pakpour, IRGC Ground Forces Commander, stated that the NESZA set up a drone centre.

== Organization ==
Across their 38 years-long history, the IRGC Ground Forces underwent to several organizational changes. From 2007 until 2015, they were organized in territorial commands in order to ensure defence against ground invasion and decapitation strikes, as well as to counter internal unrest. Alongside territorial commands, the IRGC Ground Forces also have conventional formations.

== Operational organization ==
According to Anthony Cordesman and Bryan Gold, the IRGC Ground Forces control the Basij and strictly cooperate with Basij's Imam Hossein Brigades.

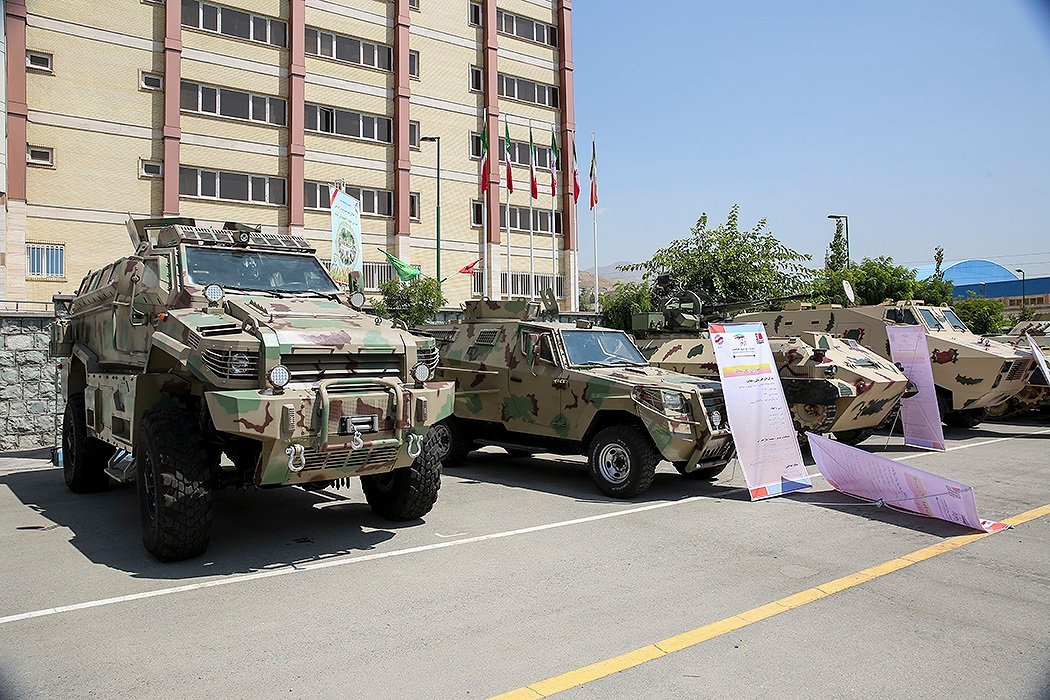
Iranian APCs and armoured cars. From left to right: Toophan MRAP, Yuz armored car, Rakhsh APC (tracked), Rakhsh APC (wheeled).

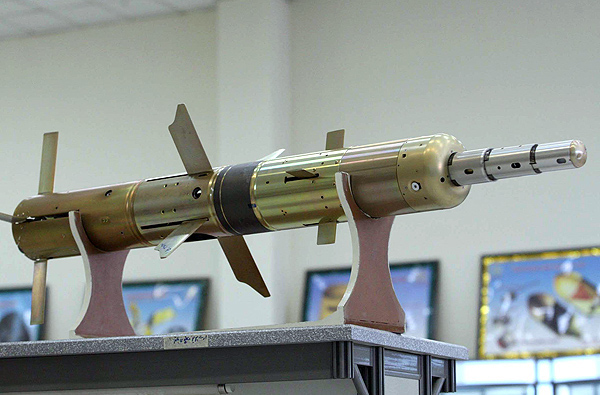
Toophan 5, the latest variant of the Iranian copy of the American anti-tank missile TOW

Due to the involvement of the IRGC Ground Forces in the Syrian Civil War, according to Ali Alfoneh for Atlantic Council an increased deployment of IRGC Ground Forces in Syria changed the IRGC itself from a political army, tasked with countering domestic unrest, to an expeditionary force.

=== Divisions and Brigades ===
The IRGC also maintains a structure of infantry and armoured formations. NEZSA also include artillery and engineer units and an airborne brigade. The IRGC Ground Forces have recently announced efforts to form an air assault unit.

According to Marie Donovan, Nicholas Carl, and Frederick W. Kagan, IRGC Ground Forces military formations are in service as cadre organizations, with officers and NCOs, but without or with few enlisted personnel. These commands and formations may be complemented by Basij's Imam Hussein infantry battalions or foreign militia and military units.

Some IRGC Ground Forces have a readiness preparation higher than others.

The Imam Hussein battalions are mixed IRGC-Basij units, with one battalion assigned to each region within a province. Imam Hussein battalions are infantry units used for internal military defence as well as for missions beyond Iranian borders. Imam Hossein Battalions deployed to Syria with IRGC operational division and brigade cadres.

Alongside Imam Hussein battalions, each Provincial command establishes at least one Basij Fatehin unit in its own boundary. While being light infantry units, Fatehin units have also been used as anti-riot force multipliers to law enforcement.

=== Saberin Unit ===
The IRGC Ground Forces have several elite units that form one single unit at a brigade level, the Saberin Unit, established in 2000. The Saberin Unit is a force highly trained in a number of specialized capabilities. Some IRGC divisions and brigades have separate Saberin units directly subordinated to them. The IRGC has also designated certain formations as light infantry commandos, or takavaran. In 2017 the NESZA set up a drone centre.

The Saberin Unit ranks its commandos according to three levels:

- Rapid Response (Vakonesh-e Sarie);
- Special Force (Nirooy-e Vijeh);
- Special Operations Force (Nirooy-e Makhsoos).

=== Aviation Unit ===
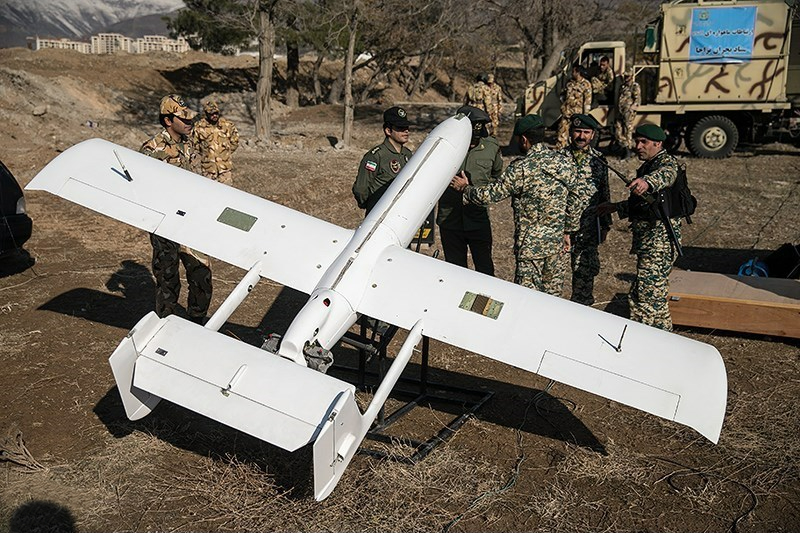
A Mohajer-2 drone

The Aviation Unit (Yegan-e Havanirooz) of the IRGC Ground Forces is the IRGC's most important helicopter unit. It was established in 2015, by order of Ali Khamenei.

The Aviation Unit consists of four subdivisions:

- Advanced Aviation Training Center;
- Helicopter Research Center;
- Helicopter Professional Repair Center;
- Seyyed-al-Shohada Aviation Base.

== Territorial organization ==
The Islamic Revolutionary Guard Corps Ground Forces have a territorial organization in charge of activities and operations. This organization has multiple layers: multi-provincial regional headquarters, provincial headquarters, commands for each county, district commands for each bakhsh (township), and a local Basij base for each neighborhood.

According to Saeid Golkar, this arrangement should constitute a system directly parallelling the state's administrative system.

=== Thar-Allah Headquarters ===
The Thar-Allah Headquarters is a command directly subordinated to the Commander of the Islamic Revolutionary Guard Corps. It is in charge of security for the Tehran area. and doubles as Headquarters with territorial responsibilities.

The Thar-Allah Headquarters is among the most important IRGC commands in Iran, tasked with protecting key institutions and the offices of the Government of Iran. The Thar-Allah Headquarters is also tasked with thwarting all threats against Tehran.

Officially, Thar-Allah's commander is the same as the IRGC commander. The Thar-Allah Headquarters, however, also has a deputy commander in charge of day-to-day operations.

=== Headquarters ===
The Islamic Revolutionary Guard Corps Ground Forces maintain ten regional headquarters (Gharargah), with the Sar-Allah headquarters in charge for Tehran and Alborz provinces as well as Tehran City. These headquarters are responsible for coordinating the activities of both operational and territorial units, being similar to corps-level commands.

This territorial organization, according to the Mosaic Doctrine and the Layered Defence approach, is focused heavily on security against internal threats and on "soft war" operations.

IRGC Ground Forces Headquarters
| Headquarters (Gharargah) | Provinces | Commander | Notes |
|---|---|---|---|
| Sar-Allah | Tehran province Alborz province | Hossein Nejat | The Sarallah Headquarters is in charge of security for Tehran area and doubles as Headquarters with territorial responsibilities. Its most important units are the 10th Seyyed ol Shohada Operational Division of Karaj, Alborz province, and the 27th Mohammad Rasoul Allah Operational Division in Tehran. |
| Hamze Seyyed-al-Shohada | West Azerbaijan province Kurdistan province | Mohammad Taghi Osanlou | It controls the western borders with Iraq and Turkey. Brigadier General Osanlou holds command of two Headquarters: Ashura and Hamze Seyyed-al-Shohada. |
| Karbala | Khuzestan province Lorestan province Kohgiluyeh and Boyer-Ahmad province | Ahmad Khadem | Established in 1981. |
| Samen-al-Aeme | North Khorasan province South Khorasan province Razavi Khorasan province | Hassan Mortazavi | Established in 2017 following the rise of Islamic State of Iraq and the Levant – Khorasan province (ISKP) in Afghanistan. |
| Najaf-al-Ashraf | Ilam province Hamadan province Kermanshah province | Mohammad Nazar Azimi | It tracks its origins to the Iran–Iraq War. Its most important units are the 29th Division of Kermanshah, the 11th Brigade of Ilam and the 32nd Brigade of Hamadan. |
| Quds | Sistan and Baluchestan province Kerman province | Mohammad Karami | Its most important units are the 41st Sarallah division of Kerman and the 110th Salman brigade of Sistan and Baluchistan. |
| Ghadir | Mazandaran province Golestan province Gilan province | Ali Shalikar | Established in 1985. Its most important units are the 25th Karabala division in Mazandaran and the 16th Qods brigade in Gilan. |
| Madineh-ye al-Munavareh | Fars province Bushehr province Hormozgan province | Hamid Sarkheili | Its most important units are is the Fajr division of Shiraz and the 33rd brigade of the Special Forces. |
| Ashura | East Azerbaijan province Zanjan province Ardabil province | Mohammad Taghi Osanlou | Brigadier General Osanlou holds command of two Headquarters: Ashura and Hamze Seyyed-al-Shohada. |
| Saheb-al-Zaman | Markazi province Qom province Semnan province Qazvin province | Ali Akbar Nouri | The Saheb-al-Zaman headquarters is in charge of the city of Qom. |
| Hazrat Seyyed-al-Shohada | Isfahan province Yazd province | Javad Esteki | The Headquarters controls several IRGC Ground Forces formations. Its most important units are the 8th Najaf Division, the 14th Imam Hossein Division, the 18th Brigade of Yazd and the 44th Brigade of Shahr-e Kord. |

=== Provincial commands ===
Flag of Muhammad Rasul Allah Corps of IRGC in charge for Tehran.

Below the multi-provincial Headquarters, there are 32 provincial or city commands. These new command centers are intended to operate flexibly and independently from Tehran.

The Islamic Revolutionary Guard Corps Ground Forces structure includes 32 separate territorial commands. These territorial commands, styled "Corps" (Sepah), have been established in 2008. They are part of the four-layered military doctrine for the defence of Iran.

The Provincial Guard was created to take over the IRGC's responsibilities on the provincial level against any and all threats as well as to enforce and coordinate re-islamization processes in Iran through social welfare programmes. Provincial units are composed of the natives of the province in which the IRGC Ground Force members serve.

The territorial commands are 31 Provincial commands and a Tehran city command for a total of 32 commands.

The provincial commands are under direct control and supervision of the IRGC commander, but the Basij are responsible for planning, supporting them logistically, and inspecting their functions. In turn, IRGC territorial commanders have a direct supervision over local Basij organizations and enjoy of authority and autonomy in order to be enabled to independently take action in case of an immediate crisis arising,

The Provincial commands do not form an independent command of their own, and as such does not have an independent line in Iran's annual state budget. Financing of provincial commands activity comes from both the Islamic Revolutionary Guard Corps Ground Forces and Basij.

Each Provincial command is composed of three main branches:

- Military command;
- Counterintelligence: primarily responsible for protecting the IRGC personnel against both physical and moral threats and identifying foreign espionage;
- Office of the Representative of the Supreme Leader: responsible for mobilizing, the IRGC and the Basij.

The main anti-riot units are Imam Ali Battalions, consisting of both cadre and full members. Imam Ali battalions are responsible for suppressing internal unrest, maintaining public order and for security patrols in the neighborhoods where they operate. Each Imam Ali battalion has a motorcycle unit for rapid deployment purposes.

Administratively, an Imam Ali battalion aligns with the Basij district. Imam Ali battalions have their training, education, and logistics centrally coordinated through the Imam Ali Headquarters. Imam Ali battalions in each city have a close relationship with the Iranian police and receive specific anti-riot equipment and training.

Since September 2012, the IRGC and Basij have established small Basij-only Beit al-Muqaddas battalions (for male Basiji) and Kowsar battalions (for female Basiji). These battalions consist of 234 active Basij members in each district. These units are designed to fulfill support roles:

- Around 1,000 of these units are assigned to support Imam Ali riot battalions;
- Around 500 Beit al-Muqaddas (i.e. male-only) battalions are assigned to support Imam Hussein infantry battalions in their military and defence missions in their local area;
- Around 500 battalions are mainly trained for relief and rescue missions under the operational command of the Imam Hadi Headquarters.

Each Provincial command also has a cyberspace division responsible for directing pro-government online voices as well as producing cyberspace propaganda in their own boundary. The intelligence department in each provincial command is directly subordinate to the IRGC Intelligence Organization.

Islamic Revolutionary Guard Corps Ground Forces provincial corps
| Province | Provincial Command | Commander | IRGC Ground Forces Headquarters | Notes |
|---|---|---|---|---|
| Kurdistan province | Kurdistan Beit-ol-Moqaddas Corps | Sadegh Hosseini | Hamze-ye Sayyed al-Shohada | |
| West Azerbaijan province | Sepah-e Shohada | Habib Shahsavari | Hamze-ye Sayyed al-Shohada | |
| Ardabil province | Sepah-e Hazrat-e Abbas | Jalil Babazadeh | Ashura | |
| East Azerbaijan province | Sepah-e Ashura | Abedin Khorram | Ashura | It includes a cyberspace headquarters. |
| Zanjan province | Sepah-e Ansar al-Mahdi | Jahanbakhsh Karami | Ashura | |
| Hamedan province | Sepah-e Ansar al-Hossein | Mazahar Majidi | Najaf-e Ashraf | |
| Ilam province | Sepah-e Amir al-Mouminin | Jamal Shakarami | Najaf-e Ashraf | |
| Kermanshah province | Kermanshah Nebi Akram Corps | Bahman Reyhani | Najaf-e Ashraf | |
| Markazi province | Sepah-e Ruhollah | Mohsen Karimi | Saheb al-Zaman | |
| Qazvin province | Sepah-e Saheb al-Amr | Mohammad Shahrokhi | Saheb al-Zaman | |
| Qom province | Sepah-e Ali bin Abu Taleb | Nohammad Taghi Shahgheraghi | Saheb al-Zaman | |
| Semnan province | Sepah-e Ghaem al-Muhammad | Hamid Damghani | Saheb al-Zaman | |
| Gilan province | Sepah-e Qods | Mohammad Abdollahpour | Ghadir | |
| Golestān province | Sepah-e Neynava | Ali Malek Shahkoui | Ghadir | |
| Mazandaran province | Sepah-e Karbala | Mohammad Hossein Babaei | Ghadir | |
| Khuzestan province | Sepah-e Vali-ye Asr | Hassan Shahvarpour | Karbala | |
| Kohgiluyeh and Boyer-Ahmad province | Sepah-e Fath | Hamid Khoramdel | Karbala | |
| Lorestan province | Sepah-e Abolfazl | Morteza Kashkouli | Karbala | |
| Chaharmahal and Bakhtiari province | Sepah-e Ghamar Bani Hashem | Ali Mohammad Akbari | Sayyed al-Shohada | |
| Isfahan province | Sepah-e Saheb al-Zaman | Hossein Fada | Sayyed al-Shohada | |
| Yazd province | Sepah-e al-Ghadir | Reza Shamsipour | Sayyed al-Shohada | |
| Razavi Khorasan province | Sepah-e Imam Reza | YaghoubAli Nazari | Samen al-Aeme | |
| North Khorasan province | Sepah-e Javad al-Aeme | Aboulghasem Chaman | Samen al-Aeme | |
| South Khorasan province | Sepah-e Ansar al-Reza | Ali Ghasemi | Samen al-Aeme | |
| Bushehr province | Sepah-e Imam Sadeq | Ali Razmjou | Madineh-ye al-Munavareh | |
| Fars province | Sepah-e Fajr | Hashem Ghiasi | Madineh-ye al-Munavareh | |
| Hormozgan province | Sepah-e Imam Sadjad | Abazar Salari | Madineh-ye al-Munavareh | |
| Kerman province | Sepah-e Sarallah | Hossein Maroufi | Qods | |
| Sistan and Baluchestan province | Sepah-e Salman | Amanollah Garshasbi | Qods | |
| Alborz province | Sepah-e Imam Hassan Mojtaba | Yousef Molaei | Sarallah | |
| Tehran province | Sepah-e Sayyed al-Shohada | Ahmad Zolghadr | Sarallah | |
| Tehran city | Sepah-e Muhammad Rasoul Allah | Mohammadreza Yazdi | Sarallah | It is the largest IRGC provincial command. |

== Commanders ==
| No. | Portrait | Commander | Took office | Left office | Time in office | Ref. |
|---|---|---|---|---|---|---|
| 1 | Yahya Rahim Safavi | Yahya Rahim Safavi (born 1952) | 17 September 1985 | 30 April 1986 | 0–1 years | – |
| 2 | Ali Shamkhani | Ali Shamkhani (1955–2026) | 30 April 1986 | 20 September 1988 | 1–2 years | – |
| – | Yahya Rahim Safavi | Yahya Rahim Safavi (born 1952) | 20 September 1988 | 24 September 1989 | 0–1 years | – |
| 3 | Mostafa Izadi | Brigadier general Mostafa Izadi (born 1956) | 24 September 1989 | 11 July 1992 | 2–3 years | – |
| 4 | Mohammad Ali Jafari | Brigadier general Mohammad Ali Jafari (born 1957) | 11 July 1992 | 20 August 2005 | 12–13 years | – |
| 5 | Ahmad Kazemi | Brigadier general Ahmad Kazemi (1958–2006) | 20 August 2005 | 9 January 2006 † | 0–1 years | |
| 6 | Mohammad Reza Zahedi | Brigadier general Mohammad Reza Zahedi (1960–2024) | 21 January 2006 | 13 July 2008 | 1–2 years | – |
| 7 | Mohammad Jafar Asadi | Brigadier general Mohammad Jafar Asadi (born 1958) | 13 July 2008 | 29 April 2009 | 0–1 years | – |
| 8 | Mohammad Pakpour | Brigadier general Mohammad Pakpour (1961–2026) | 29 April 2009 | 19 June 2025 | 15–16 years | – |
| 9 | Mohammad Karami | Brigadier general Mohammad Karami (born 1966) | 19 June 2025 | Incumbent | 0–1 years | |

== See also ==
- Islamic Republic of Iran Armed Forces
- Islamic Republic of Iran Army
- Defense industry of Iran
- List of Equipment of the Iranian Army
- Historical equipment of the Iranian Army
- List of armies by country
- Ebrahim Zolfaghari
