= Kurdistan Beit-ol-Moqaddas Corps =

Unit under the Islamic Revolutionary Guard Corps

- Country: Iran
- Allegiance: Iran
- Branch: Islamic Revolutionary Guard Corps
- Role: Warfare and public control
- Size: 36,000+
- Garrison/HQ: Sanandaj، Kurdistan province

Commanders
- Commander: Sadegh Hosseini‌
- Substitute: Alireza Madani

Kurdistan Beit-ol-Moqaddas Corps is a military unit under Basij and IRGC. Their headquarters is located in Sanandaj, and they are the largest and in charge of controlling all IRGC Corps and Basij units in Kurdistan province.

== Background ==
The history of the formation of this unit goes back to 1984 and was formed alongside the 662 Jerusalem Brigade during the Iran-Iraq war. This unit participated in Nasr 1, Karbala 1, Karbala 4 and Karbala 5, Wal-Fajr 8, Wal-Fajr 9 and Wal-Fajr 10 operations as a combat unit. After the integration of the IRGC and Basij ground force units, then the formation of provincial corps was established.

The biggest sub-units which are a part of this unit are the 22nd Jerusalem Army, Sanandaj Army, Saqqez Army, Marivan Army and Baneh Army, all of which’s members are ethnic Kurds. Currently, Brigadier General Sadegh Hosseini is the commander of this unit.

== Activities ==
In February 2019, the corps had about 6,000 projects to help the people of Kurdistan province who were suffering from poverty. They have been involved in many clashes with the KDPI. In 1996, the KDPI agreed to stop all of its military activities in Iran. In 2018, a new wave of clashes sparked between the KDPI and the corps, causing the deaths of 20 Corps members and 11 KDPI rebels. In September 2018, the corps claimed responsibility for a missile strike against the headquarters of the KDP in Iraq. The strike reportedly killed 15 people and wounded 50.

The Kurdistan Beit-ol-Moqaddas Corps have also served as a counterterrorist group which fights back against Sunni extremism which has held a significant ground among the Kurds there. Their leader has stated that "the people of Kurdistan are committed Muslims and they hate the Takfiri groups", referring to the Islamic State and others.

The IRGC, using a sizable budget, fund dozens of military, cultural, social, and sporting events, in every Iranian province. Of which, the Kurdistan Beit-ol-Moqaddas Corps and the Kermanshah Nebi Akram Corps are the two that include the Kurdish language and Kurdish clothing in their events.
