= Imam Ali Battalions =

Iranian security units since 2011

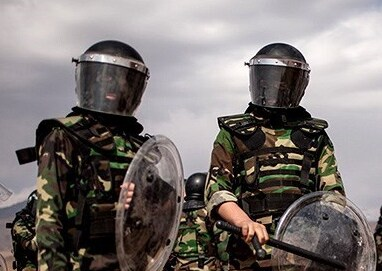
Imam Ali Battalion in Qeshm suppressing protests

The Imam Ali Battalions are units of the Basij and form part of the structures used to suppress street protests in the Islamic Republic of Iran.They operate under the supervision of the Islamic Revolutionary Guard Corps (IRGC).The battalions were created in April 2011 following the suppression of the 2009 Iranian presidential election protests, with the stated purpose of countering urban uprisings. Their official mission is described as defending the 1979 Revolution and safeguarding the security of the Islamic Republic. Before their formation, the Ashura Battalions and al-Zahra Battalions were responsible for dealing with urban unrest. Following the merger of the Basij into the IRGC Ground Forces and the establishment of provincial IRGC corps, their missions were adjusted. The Ashura Battalions were tasked with protecting neighborhoods and responding to natural disasters.

The Imam Ali Battalions constitute the fourth layer in Iran’s operational structure for protest control, after the ordinary police, the Special Units of NAJA, and the active Basij forces based in neighborhoods and mosques. They are deployed in situations where the police cannot control demonstrations due to their size or intensity. The creation of these battalions was overseen by Mehdi Rabbani, then deputy of the Sarallah Headquarters, who played a major role in directing the suppression of the 2009 protests in Tehran. In September 2019, Gholamhossein Gheibparvar, former commander of the Basij, was appointed as deputy commander of the IRGC in the Central Security Headquarters of Imam Ali.

== Role in suppression of protests ==
Imam Ali Battalion forces have actively participated in beating and arresting protesters. They played a significant role in the 2019–2020 Iranian protests and the Mahsa Amini protests (2022–2023), detaining demonstrators and transferring them to intelligence detention centers.

== See also ==
- Islamic Revolutionary Guard Corps
- Basij
- Thar-Allah Headquarters
- Mahsa Amini Protests
- 2009 Iranian presidential election protests
