= Mohammad Jafar Asadi =

Iranian senior military officer

Sardar Mohammad Jafar Asadi
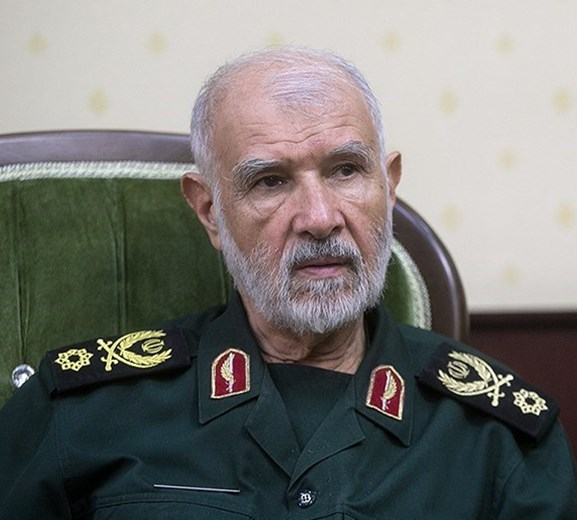
- Born: 1948 (age 77–78); Shiraz, Pahlavi Iran
- Relatives: Saleh Asadi (Brother)
- Military career
- Allegiance: Iran
- Branch: IRGC
- Service years: 1980–present
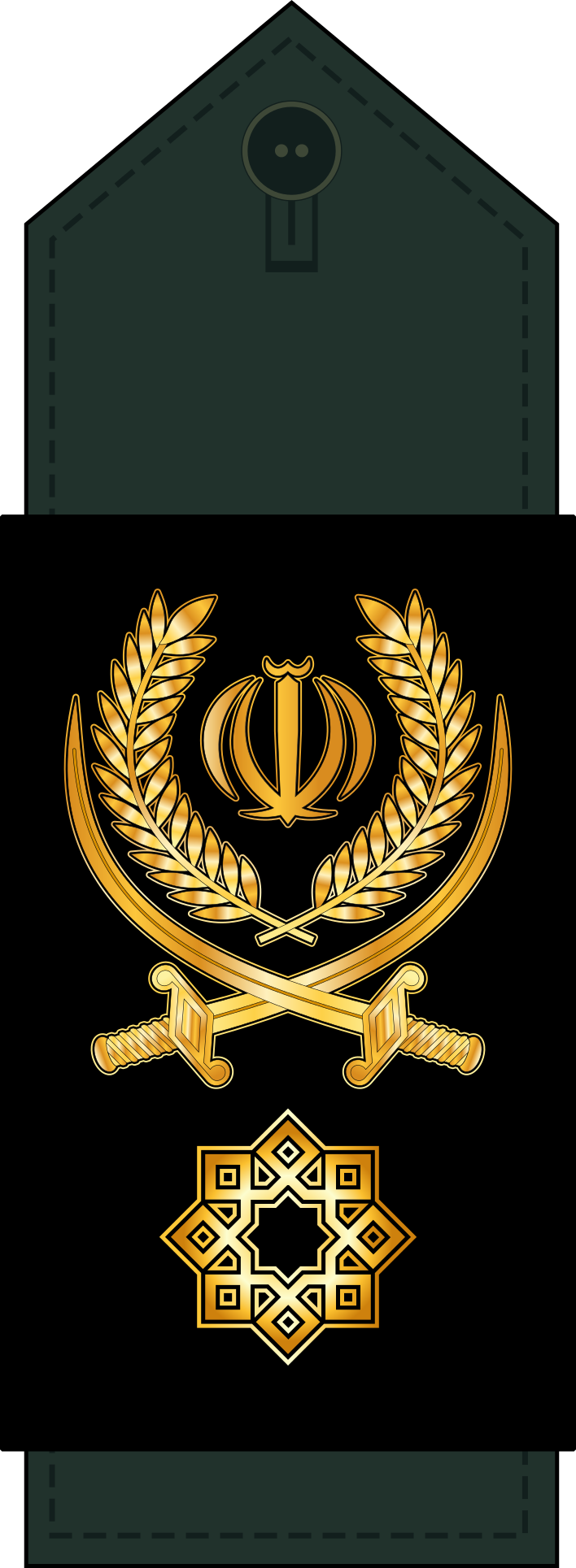
- Rank: Brigadier General
- Commands: Deputy Commander of Khatam al-Anbiya Central Headquarters (2009–Present); IRGC Ground Force (2008–2009); Deputy Inspector of the Armed Forces General Staff (2005–2008); Deputy Commander IRGC Ground Force (1999–2002); 19th Fajr Division (1992–1999); Deputy Inspector of the (IRGC) (1991–1992); 31st Ashura Division (1988–1991); 33rd Al-Mahdi Division (1982–1988)
- Conflicts: Iran–Iraq War; KDPI insurgency (1989–1996); Insurgency in Sistan and Balochistan; Syrian civil war; Iranian intervention in Syria; War in Iraq (2013–2017); Iranian intervention in Iraq; Iran–PJAK conflict; Western Iran clashes; 2024 Iran–Israel conflict; Twelve-Day War; 2026 Iran war

Mohammad Jafar Asadi (Persian: محمدجعفر اسدی) is an Iranian senior military officer in the Islamic Revolutionary Guard Corps and the deputy commander of Khatam al-Anbiya Central Headquarters. He previously commanded IRGC Ground Forces between 2008 and 2009. Asadi is a veteran of the Iran–Iraq War and he was the commander of 33rd Al-Mahdi Division.

Military offices
Preceded by Mohammad Reza Zahedi	Commander of the Islamic Revolutionary Guard Ground Force; 2008–2009	Succeeded by Mohammad Pakpour
