= Saberin Takavar Brigade =

- گردان تکاور صابرين
- Active: 2000–present
- Country: Iran
- Allegiance: Supreme Leader of Iran
- Branch: Ground Force
- Type: Takavar
- Role: Special operations
- Size: Brigade (between 6,000 and 8,000 members)
- Part of: Islamic Revolutionary Guard Corps
- Garrison/HQ: Tehran
- Mottos: "If there are 20 Saberin amongst you, they will overcome 200, and if there be a 100 Saberin they will overcome a 1,000 of those who disbelieve." ^{[Quran 8:65]}
- Engagements: PJAK insurgency Sistan and Baluchestan insurgency Syrian Civil War; Iranian intervention in Iraq
- Website: Saberin News

Commanders
- Current commander: 2nd Brigadier General Mohammad Hosseini

The Saberin Takavar Brigade (Persian: گردان تکاور صابرين; meaning Steadfasts Commando Battalions) also known as Saberin Unit is an elite Takavar unit in the Ground Forces of the Islamic Revolutionary Guard Corps. It is considered one of the best Takavar units in the Iranian Armed Forces, with decades of military and combat experience both at home and especially in overseas operations in neighboring countries. It is one of the most exclusive units in the IRGC, having at least 6,000 members, all of them volunteers and handpicked from the best and most capable units in the IRGC Ground, Air and Sea forces.

Together with the Quds Force operatives and the Sepah Navy Special Force marines, they are considered the elite, top tier unit of the IRGC.

== Origin ==
"Saberin" means the patient ones. According to commanders, the unit's name is inspired by a Quran verse:

O Prophet! Motivate the believers to fight. If there are twenty steadfast among you, they will overcome two hundred. And if there are one hundred of you, they will overcome one thousand of the disbelievers, for they are a people who do not comprehend.

— Quran 8:65

After the Iran-Iraq War (1980-1988), the IRGC Ground Forces saw the need to establish a special forces unit capable of undertaking difficult combat operations from land, sea, and air. This would be a different function than the Quds Force, the external operations unit. In the year 2000, the then IRGC commander, General Mohammad Ali Jafari funded the Saberin unit. The current Saberin commander is Brigadier General Sadegh Mahmoudi. According to Brigadier General Morteza Mirian, the commander of Saberin operations against PJAK in 2012 and deputy commander of IRGC Ground Forces Operations Directorate, the unit emulates from tactics deployed by 11 special forces units, particularly the British Special Air Service. They also studied the U.S. and Israeli special forces.

As with any IRGC unit, the Saberin Brigade is a strong ideological military force. Thus, the unit places two essential requirements among its fighters to possess: first, faith, extreme loyalty, and ideological commitment to the Islamic Republic, and second, rigorous technical knowledge and combat skills on the battlefield. The Saberin is known for its special emphasis on sniper training, producing some of the best snipers in the Iranian Armed Forces.

== Description ==
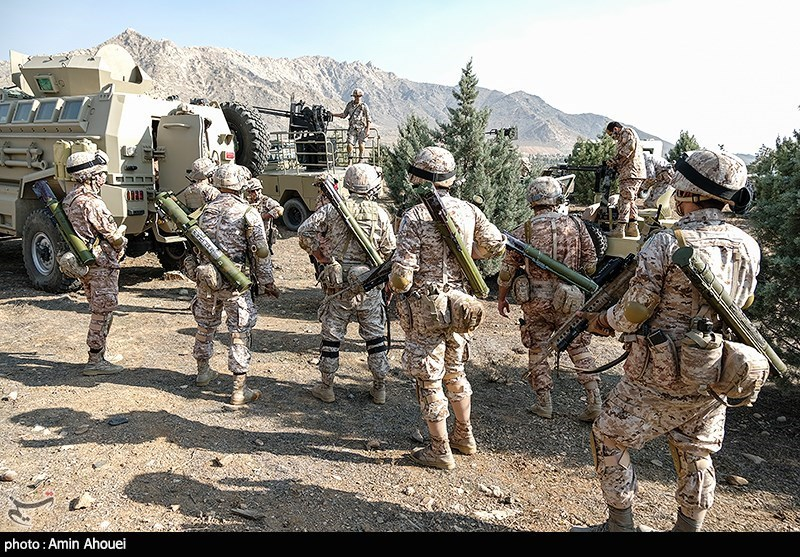
Photo of Saberin Unit commandos next to a Toufaan MRAP

Despite being one of the newest units in the IRGC, having been created in the 2000, its one of its most battle-hardened troops, with hundred of operations both inside and outside Iran, against terrorist and subversive elements. Recently, it has been specially active in conflicts around the region, such as Syria and Iraq. As a result, the unit, has transformed itself, together with the Quds Force, in an essential part of the Iranian expeditionary forces and in the symbol of its power projection in the region. The IRGCGF Saberin units are highly trained in a numerous specialized capabilities, such as raiding, hostage rescue, heliborne assault, counter-terrorism operations and special reconnaissance. Some Saberin personnel use ultralight aircraft and are capable of conducting operations in any kind of terrain and environmental conditions, including mountains, deserts, and swamps. As stated before, the Saberin personnel have also been deployed to Syria to support Iranian combat operations. The Department of Defense's 2010 Military Power of Iran report:

"Each Provincial Corps in the IRGC-GF possesses a unit, called Saberin, which has special operations capabilities. These units rotate to the northwest to perform counterinsurgency against the Kurdish PJAK and to the southeast to operate against Jundallah, and recently have been directly involved in other conflicts of the region, such as Syria."

The Unit, has a close relationship with other special forces of the Iranian Armed Forces, specially with the 65th NOHED Brigade, having received training from them regularly since its foundation.

The Saberin Unit ranks its commandos according to three levels:

- Rapid Response (Vakonesh-e-Sarie);
- Special Force (Nirooy-e-Vijeh);
- Special Operations Force (Nirooy-e-Makhsoos).
