= Hapsa Khan =

Kurdish feminist

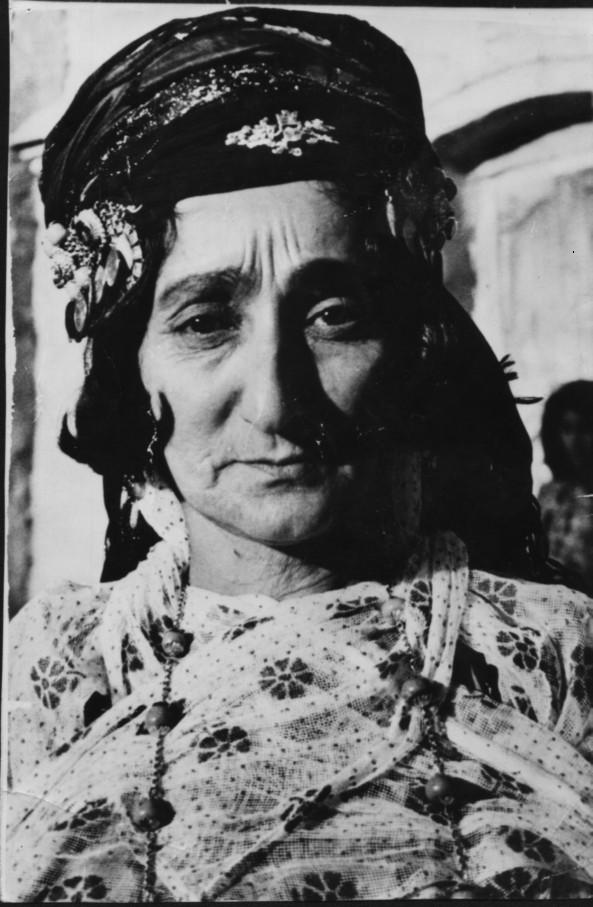
- Born: 1891; Sulaymaniyah
- Died: 12 April 1953 (aged 61–62)
- Occupations: Teacher, activist
- Known for: Founded the first women's school in Iraq

Hapsa Khan (Kurdish: حەپسەخان, romanized: Hepise Xan) was an early Kurdish feminist and nationalist leader who founded the first women's school in Iraq. The organisation was called the Kurdish Women's Association.

She was born in 1891 in Sulaymaniyah to a prominent Kurdish family. She was the daughter of Sheikh Marif and Salma Khan. In 1926 she played a significant role in the foundation of the first school for girls in Sulaymaniyah/Silêmanî "by going from house to house with the teachers to register as many girls as possible, and to even convince parents to send their daughters to school". The German photographer Lotte Errell described Hapsa Khan as a woman “whose husband gets up when she enters the room”.

In 1920, Hapsa Khan married the Kurdish leader Sheikh Qadir Hafid, brother of Mahmud Barzanji, who played a leading role in the Kurdish resistance to British occupation. She played a role in the revolt by financing it, convincing others to join it and organising protests in Sulaymaniyah.

In 1930, Hapsa Khan sent a letter to the League of Nations, advocating for Kurdish rights and a Kurdish state. When Qazi Muhammad founded the Republic of Mahabad in 1946, she supported the decision to declare independence.

After her death in 1953, her home became a school. Hapsa Khan continues to be a strong influence on modern Kurdish women. In February 2019, Kurdistan24 reported that the winner of a fashion contest in Sulaymaniyah based her design for a traditional costume on Hapsa Khan's style.
