= Maran Qaleh =

Maran Qaleh ماران قلعه
- Village
- Location within Iran
- Coordinates: 28°36′51″N 57°38′51″E
- Country: Iran
- Province: Kerman
- County: Jiroft
- Bakhsh: Central
- Rural District: Khatunabad

Population (2006)
  - Total: 170
- Time zone: UTC+3:30 (IRST)
  - Summer (DST): UTC+4:30 (IRDT)

Maran Qaleh (Persian: ماران قلعه, also Romanized as Mārān Qal‘eh; also known as Galū, Mārān Galū, Mārāngelī, Mārān Gellā, and Maran Ghal‘eh) is a village in Khatunabad Rural District, in the Central District of Jiroft County, Kerman Province, Iran. At the 2006 census, its population was 170, in 37 families.
