= Kermanshah Nabi Akram Corps =

Unit under the Islamic Revolution Guards Corps

Kermanshah Nebi Akram Corps
- سپاه نبی اکرم کرمانشاه
- Active: 2007
- Country: Islamic Republic of Iran
- Allegiance: Islamic Republic of Iran Armed Forces
- Branch: Islamic Revolutionary Guard Corps
- Role: Warfare and public control
- Size: 75,000+
- Garrison/HQ: Kermanshah, Kermanshah province

Commanders
- Commander: Bahman Reyhani
- ‌Ceremonial chief: ‌Masoud Qanbari

Kermanshah Nabi Akram Corps (Persian: سپاه نبی اکرم کرمانشاه) is a military unit under IRGC and Basij. Their headquarters are located in Kermanshah, and they are the main unit in Kermanshah and are responsible for commanding all Corps and Basij units located in Kermanshah province.

== Background ==
This unit was formed in 1983 during the Iran–Iraq War. The biggest units in this corps are the 29th Nabi Akram Brigade, 4th Baaset Army, 59th Muslim Bin Aqeel Brigade, 100th Ansar al-Rasoul Brigade, Kermanshah Army, Paveh Army, West Islamabad Army, Sarpol Zahab Army, Sanghar Army, Sahne Army, and Gilangharb Army, all of whose members are Kurds native to Kermanshah province. At present, Brigadier General Bahman Reyhani is the commander of the Nabi Akram Corps.

== Activities ==
The Nabi Akram Corps were deployed to Iraq and Syria during the War against the Islamic State. They became controversial during the Mahsa Amini protests after many human rights abuses were done by their soldiers, who recorded themselves as they were throwing tear gas and shooting at protesters while shouting "Allahu Akbar." They later published those videos as a "message" to other protestors. Nabi Akram fighters were heavily criticized for "attacking their own fellow Kurds", and also for arresting many activists.

The IRGC annually funds dozens of cultural, military, social, and sporting events using a sizable budget. They are held in every Iranian province. The Kermanshah Nabi Akram Corps and the Kurdistan Beit-ol-Moqaddas Corps are the ones who include Kurdish clothing and the Kurdish language in their events.

At least 10 members of the Nabi Akram Corps were killed during 2025–2026 Iranian protests.
