= Toofan (MRAP) =

Light tactical military vehicle

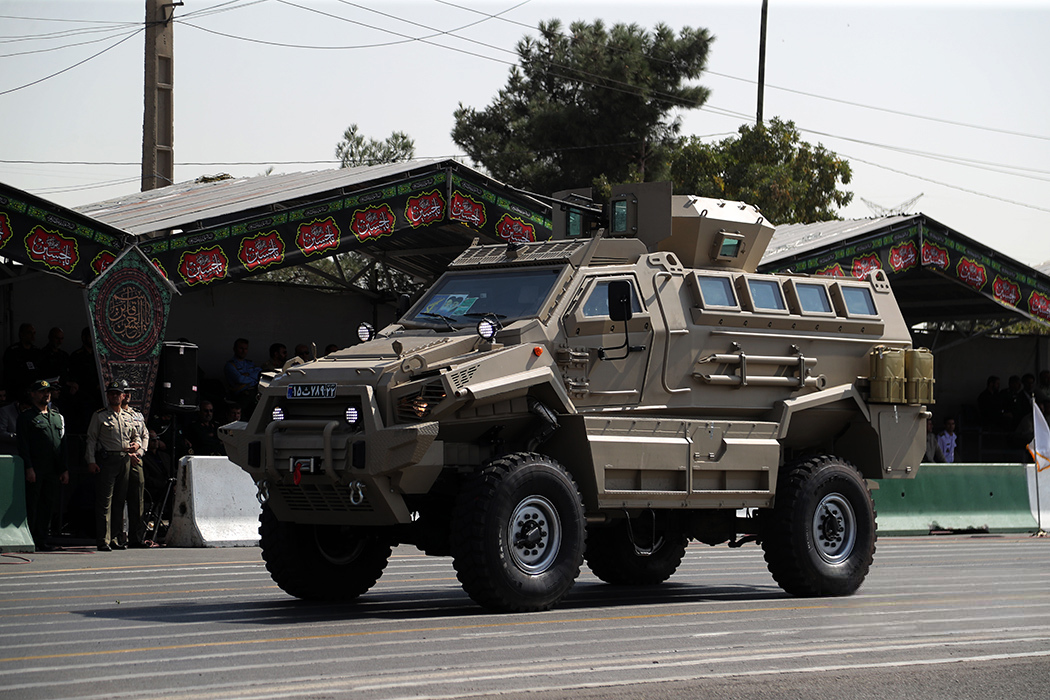
- Closeup of the Toofan MRAP.
- Type: MRAP
- Place of origin: Iran

Service history
- In service: 2018–present
- Used by: Iran; Iraq

Production history
- Designer: Ministry of Defence and Armed Forces Logistics
- Produced: 2018–present

Specifications
- Crew: 2
- Passengers: 10
- Armor: Ballistic protection up to STANAG 4569 level 2 or 3
- Main armament: Numerous, including 12.7mm Heavy Machine Gun
- Engine: diesel 360 hp (270 kW)
- Transmission: Four-wheel drive
- Operational range: With flat tyre up to 50 km (31 mi)
- Maximum speed: 100 km/h (62 mph)

The Toofan (Persian: طوفان, lit. 'Storm or Hurricane'), sometimes known as Toophan, Toufan or Tufan, is an Iranian MRAP armored vehicle. It was designed and manufactured by the Iranian Ministry of Defence to enter into service with the IRGC Ground Forces and NAJA.

== History ==
The MRAP was first seen at the 2016 IPAS convention in Iran. The Toofan was publicly unveiled on November 20, 2018 with Defense Minister Brigadier General Amir Hatami attending the event. Five Toofans were initially produced.

Due to the Toofan's resemblance to the STREIT Group's Typhoon MRAP, the STREIT Group announced after the unveiling that it was exploring legal options for compensation.

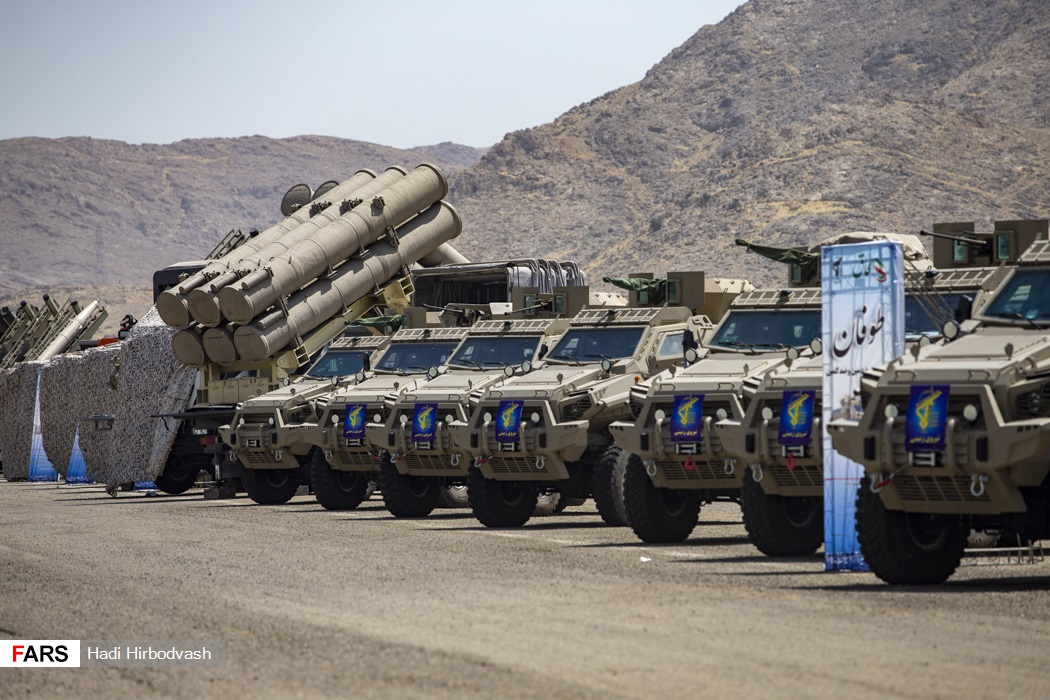
A line of Toofan MRAPs in Iranian service

On June 26, 2021, Toofan MRAPs were shown in a parade held by the Popular Mobilization Forces (PMF) in Camp Ashraf, Diyala, Iraq.

== Design ==
The Toofan was developed to provide Iranian forces with a highly mobile vehicle that is capable of carrying out logistics and combat missions in all possible theaters of war. The features of the Toofan are that it is ambush protected with ballistic protection to resist land mines, improvised explosive devices (IEDs) and steel core bullets. It can be outfitted with STANAG 4569 level 2 or 3 protection.

It has a 360 hp engine, is able to drive through 1.5 m (4 ft 11 in) of water and climbing barriers of 50 cm (20 in). It can carry up to 10 personnel and is equipped with run-flat tires allowing it to drive for 50 km (31 mi) with a flat tire. A spare tire is mounted on the right side. It can also drive at speeds of up to 100 km/h (62 mph).

The MRAP's components are made in Iran, except for the gearbox, engine and suspension. A V-shaped hull underneath is used to deflect explosions from underneath.

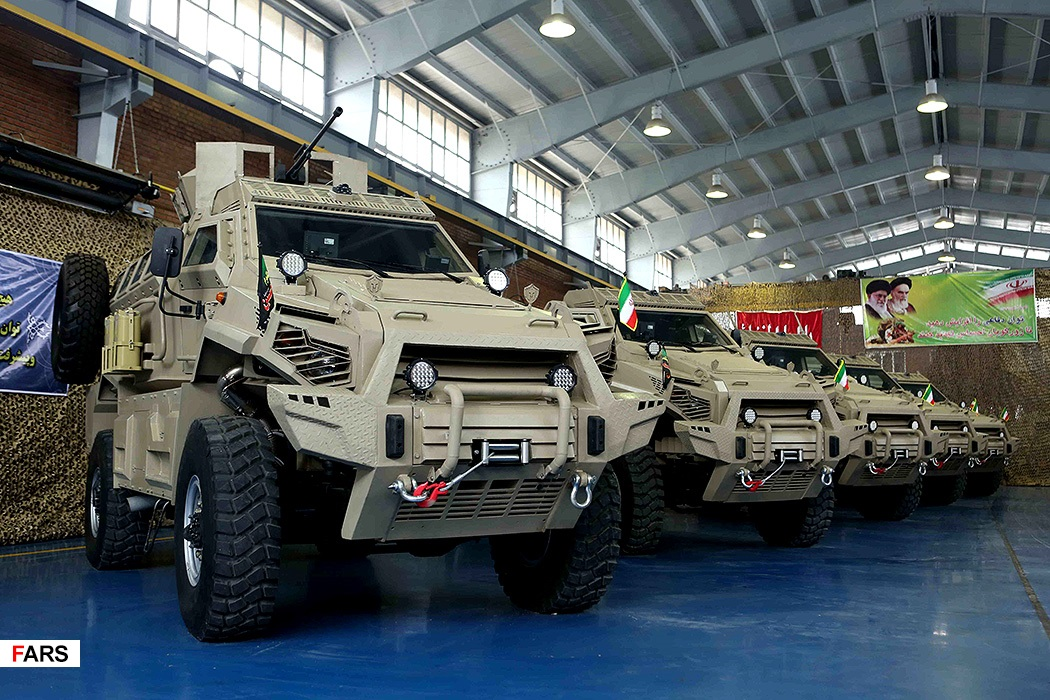
Toofan Lineup

Its appearance resembles the STREIT Group Typhoon MRAP with similarities based on its physical appearance and its dimensions.

=== Armaments ===
The Toofan can be equipped with semi-heavy weapons onto the tailgate gun shields and turrets if needed, including a 12.7mm heavy machine gun with gun shield.

== Cost ==
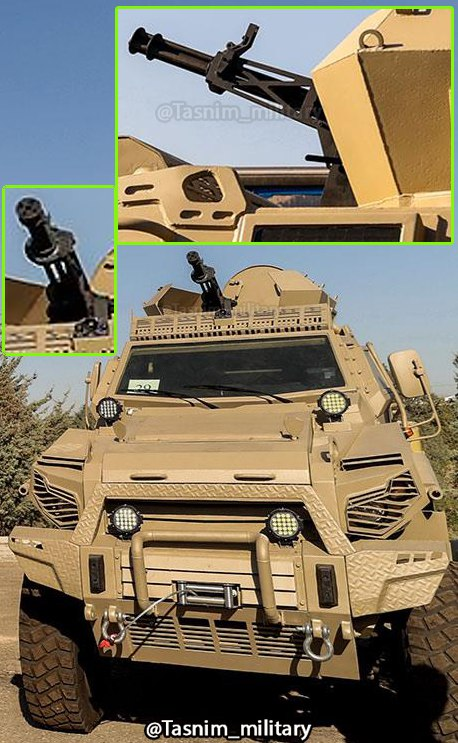
Toofan's 12.7mm machine gun

The cost of the program is disclosed but during his address to the press, Brigadier General Hatami stated that "such a vehicle costs around $500,000 in the international market, [while] Iranian experts have manufactured [the] Toofan at a much lower price."

== Operators ==
- Iran
  - Iranian Armed Forces
    - Artesh
      - Ground Forces
    - Islamic Revolutionary Guard Corps
      - Ground Forces
  - Iranian police
    - Border Guard Command
- Iraq
  - Popular Mobilization Forces.
