= Bahman Reyhani =

Commander of the Nabi Akram Corps

Bahman Reyhani (Persian: بهمن ریحانی; Kurdish: بەهمەن رەیحانی) is an Iranian commander. On 20 June 2014, he was appointed as the commander of the Kermanshah Nebi Akram Corps, a Kurdish force in the IRGC located in Kermanshah province, based on the order of Mohammad Ali Jafari, the commander of the IRGC at the time, in a ceremony attended by Hossein Salami, the deputy commander of the IRGC at the time. Reyhani has played a decisive role in helping the victims of the 2018 Sarpol-e Zahab earthquake. Bahman Reyhani was included in the sanctions list of the European Union on 21 December 2022, due to gross violations of human rights in Iran.

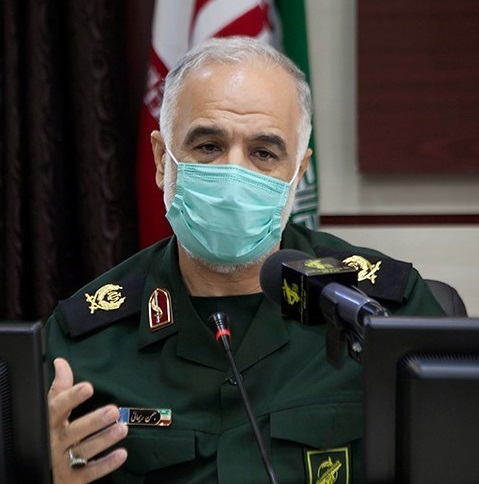
Bahman Reyhani in 2021

== Biography ==
Bahman Rayhani is an ethnic Kurd and a Kermanshah native. Before assuming the command of Nabi Akram Corps, from 2008 to 2014, he was deputy commander of the Nabi Akram Corps of Kermanshah province. Before that, he was the regional commander of Basij in Kermanshah province.

In March 2019, Rayhani was promoted to the rank of Brigadier General by Ali Khamenei, the Commander-in-Chief of the Islamic Republic of Iran.

== Protests ==
During many different waves of protests in Iran, most notably the 2019–2020 Iranian protests and the Mahsa Amini protests, Reyhani and his corps targeted citizens with direct fire. According to Reuters, these protests left 1,500 dead. Amnesty International published a report and confirmed the identity of 700 of the victims of the November protests. According to this report, during the suppression of these protests in Kermanshah province, at least 92 people died. In a conference honoring the Basijis of Kermanshah, Reyhani insulted the protesters and called them "troublemakers and rioters" and claimed that the detainees confessed that "they were organized by the enemies to destroy public and public property." Reyhani announced the "arrest and identification of most of the leaders" of the Aban protests.

== Sanctions ==
Simultaneously with the execution of two young people arrested in the nationwide protests, by the verdict of the courts of the Islamic Republic of Iran, Bahman Rayhani, along with 19 other real persons and the Islamic Republic of Iran Broadcasting Organization, were placed on the sanctions list of the European Union on 21 December 2022, due to violations of human rights.
