= Historical equipment of the Iranian Army =

This article will only consider military equipment that has been used since 1925, and is no longer considered 'standard issue' within the regular armed forces.

From 1925 to the Iranian Revolution in 1979, Iran used to be equipped with the very latest Western hardware. Cases exist where Iran was supplied with equipment even before it was made standard in the countries that developed it (for example the US F-14 Tomcat, or the British Chieftain Tank). The Iran–Iraq War, and post-revolutionary sanctions at the time had a dramatic effect on Iran's inventory of Western equipment. Under the pressures of war all supplies were quickly exhausted and replacements became increasingly difficult to come by. Despite severe concerns regarding quality and effective design, the war eventually forced Iran to turn towards the Soviet Union and China amongst others to meet its short term military requirements. Nevertheless, the experience of using advanced and high quality Western equipment was not lost on any of the branches of the Iranian armed forces. Severely disappointed with the inferior Russian and Eastern equipment, Iran sought to develop its own indigenous ability to mirror the high technology of the west and to provide a totally reliable source of equipment for the future.

== Hardware ==
Most of the Iranian combat vehicles are a motley mix of U.S., Chinese, and Soviet-era Russian materials. The American vehicles (M60 Patton tanks) came from between 1941 and 1979, when the U.S. and its bloc supported the government of the Shah. During the Iran–Iraq War of 1980-1988, much of the replenishing of the Iranian materials came through Communist China. After the Iran–Iraq War and a relatively moderate stance by Iran during the 1990s, Russia began to sell the Iranian regime military goods (SCUD launchers, T-55, T-62 & T-72 tanks.)

- AK-47, known in Iran as the Kalash.
- Heckler & Koch G3 Battle rifle is the standard army rifle produced in Iran under license and known as Zhe se meaning G3.

== Recent Wars ==
- Iran–Iraq War

== See also ==
- Iranian Navy
- Islamic Republic of Iran Air Force
