= Kurdish traditional clothing =

Traditional clothing of the Kurdish people

Kurdish traditional clothing, also known as Kurdish dress (Sorani Kurdish: جلوبەرگی کوردی, Kurdish: Cil û bergên kurdî), refers to the folk costumes of the Kurdish people. The traditions typically vary across different regions and tribes of Kurdistan, but it has some common elements. Historically, Kurdish clothing was more complex and varied, but it has evolved to a simpler form over time. It is also prominently worn during festivals and special occasions such as Newroz.

== History ==
One of the earliest description of Kurds having a particular way of dressing is attested by 13th-century historian Ibn Khallikan. The Kurds were described to have dressed a clothing made of cotton, and wearing the mandil hat. The mandil hat is a long piece of cloth that is rolled several times around the head to form the turban, or handkerchief that replaces it.

== Men's clothing ==
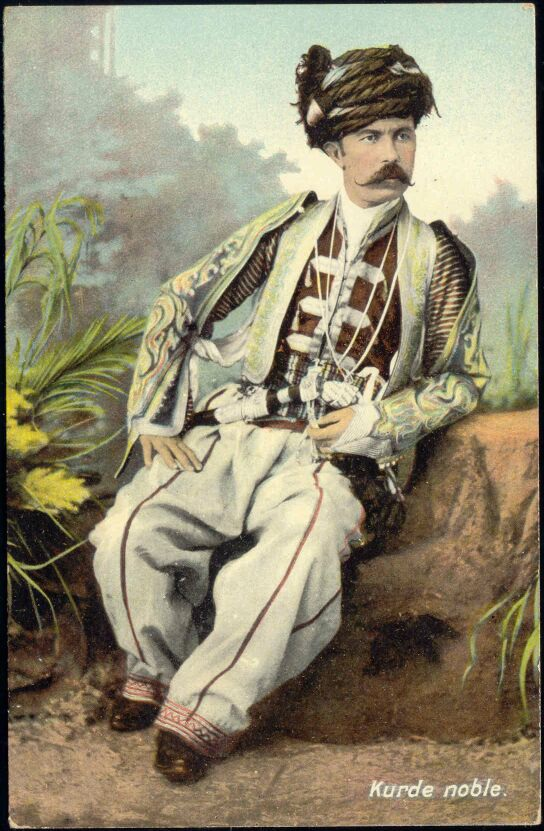
Noble Kurdish Man with traditional costumes, 1880

The traditional clothing of Kurdistan can be categorized into three main types for men.

=== Northern Kurdish ===
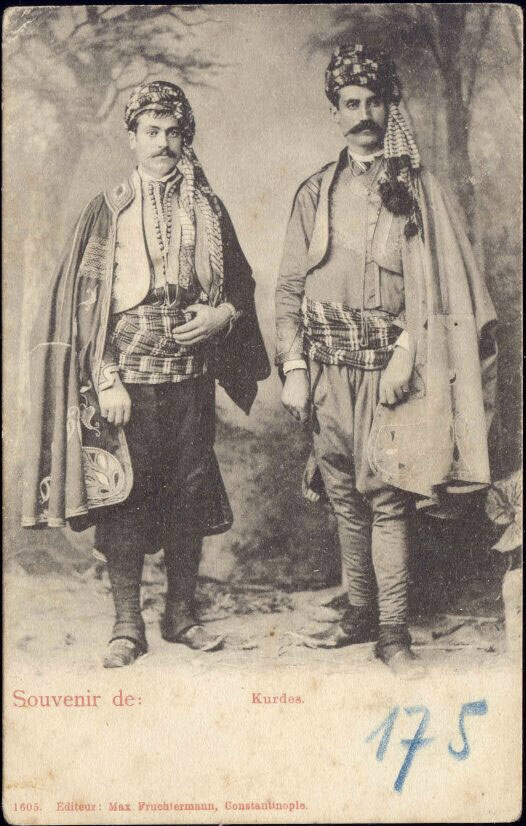
Two Kurds From Constantinople 1899

Traditional northern Kurdish clothing is tight-fitting and resembles rural Turkish attire as well as Balkan costumes. The trousers feature tight lower legs and a loose, baggy crotch that can extend to knee length. Neck scarves are commonly worn, and waistcoats over shirts are typical. The headgear (Jamana) varies, with options like loose turbans, skullcaps, or a mix of both, and is generally modest in size. In some tribal groups, the shirts have distinctive funnel-shaped sleeves.

=== Central Kurdish ===
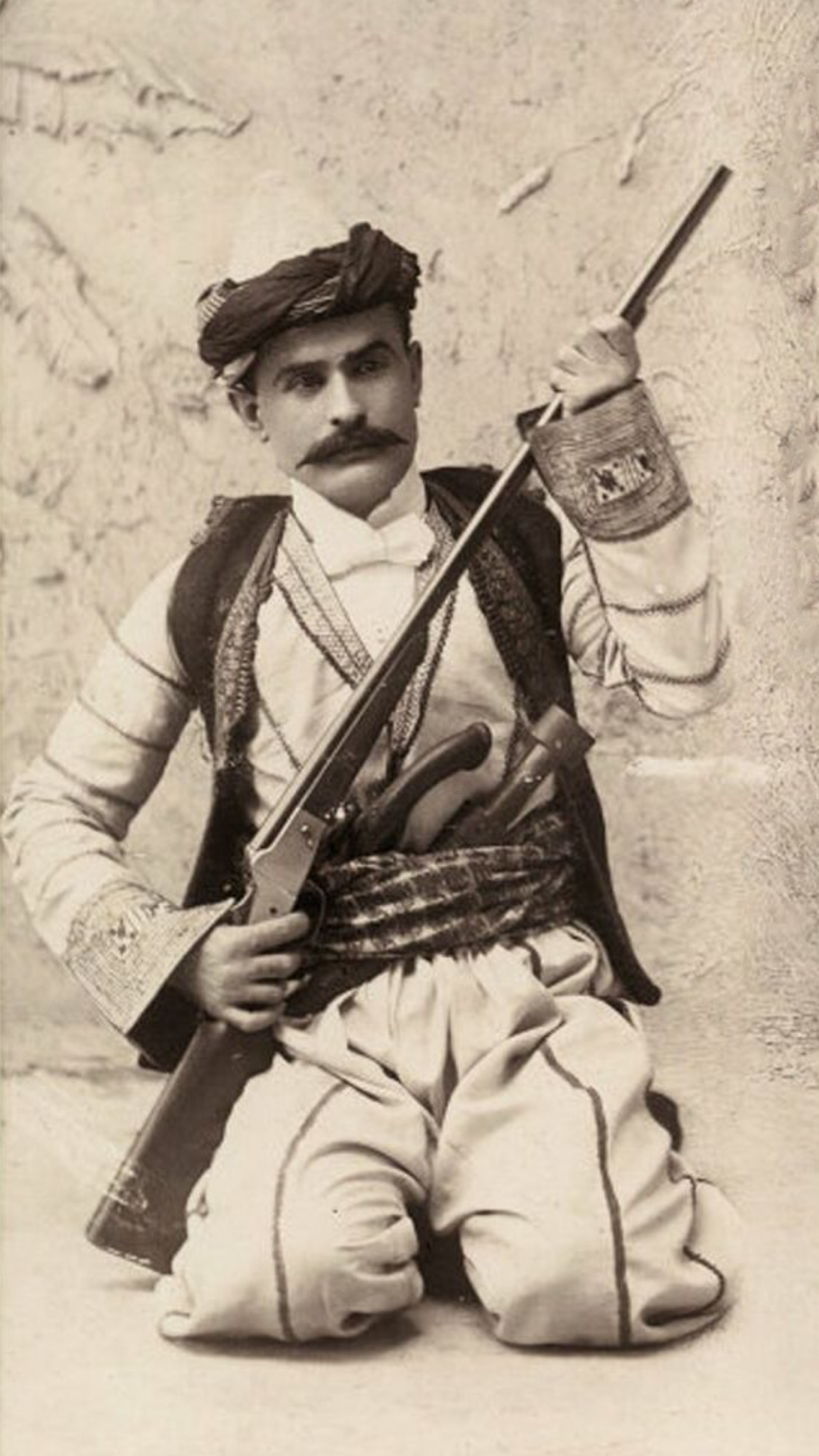
Kurdish men's style, Urmia 1894

The traditional Central Kurdish clothing, known as Şal û Şepik, is widely recognized in Iraqi Kurdistan and southern Turkish Kurdistan, including Hakkari Province. It is also named after the region where it is worn, such as Badinani, Hakkari, or Rewanduzi. This style consists of a fitted collarless jacket, open to the waist, tucked into gathered trousers that flare to the ankle. The suit is often embroidered, with colors ranging from striped browns and creams to self-colored stripes. The white shirt with funnel sleeves is often worn, with the sleeves usually wound around the outside of the jacket arms. A sash, often large but now less substantial, is worn around the waist and can be tied in elaborate ways, traditionally storing small personal items. Headdresses vary by tribe but usually consist of a turban made from a coiled chequered scarf around a skullcap, available in many shapes and colors. The turban has no hanging tail and can be removed and replaced without untying. Favored scarf colors are black, gray, and white, except for the Barzani tribe and Yezidis, who wear red and white check.

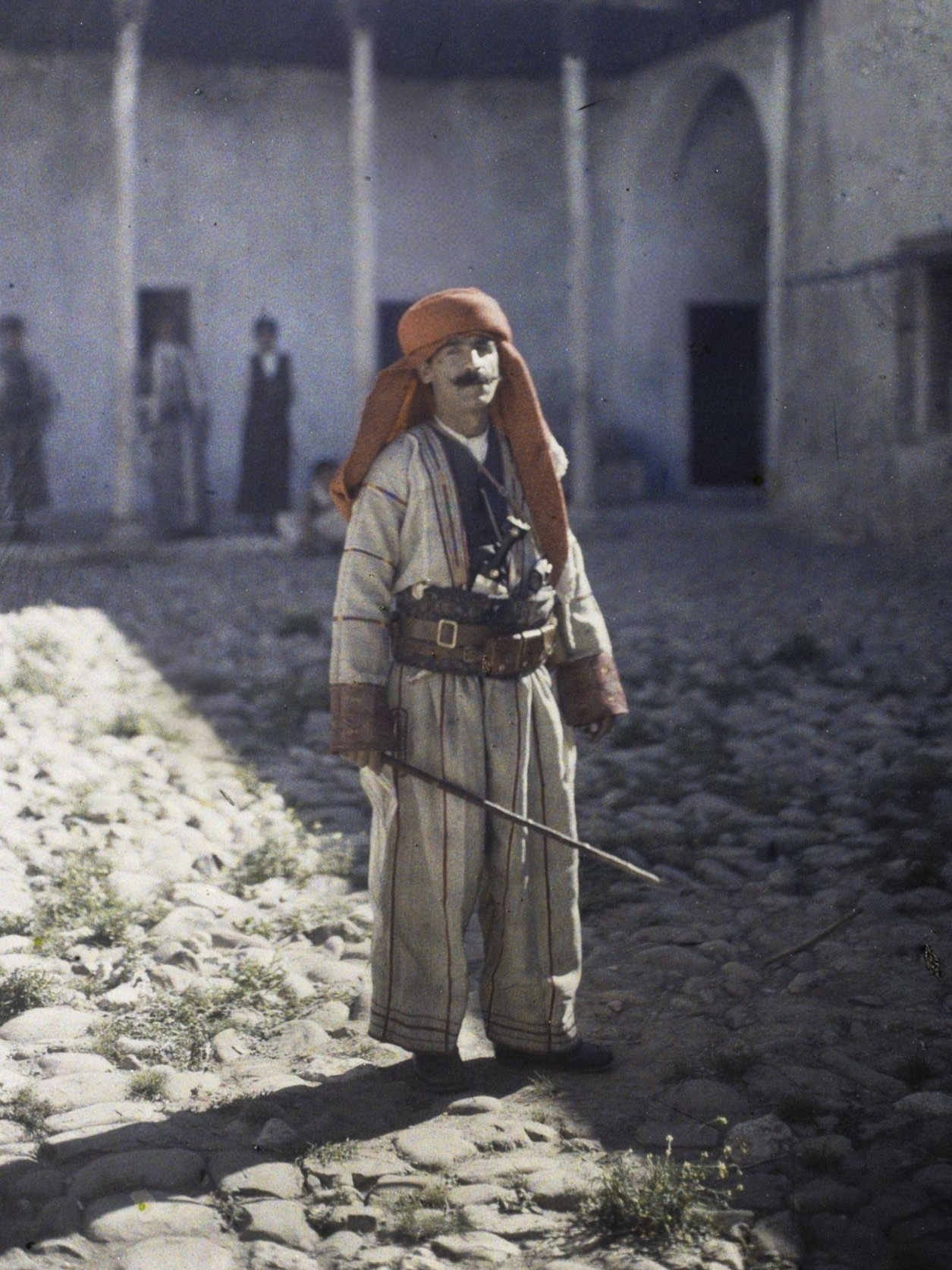
Kurdish man in Bahdinani-style attire from Zakho, 1927

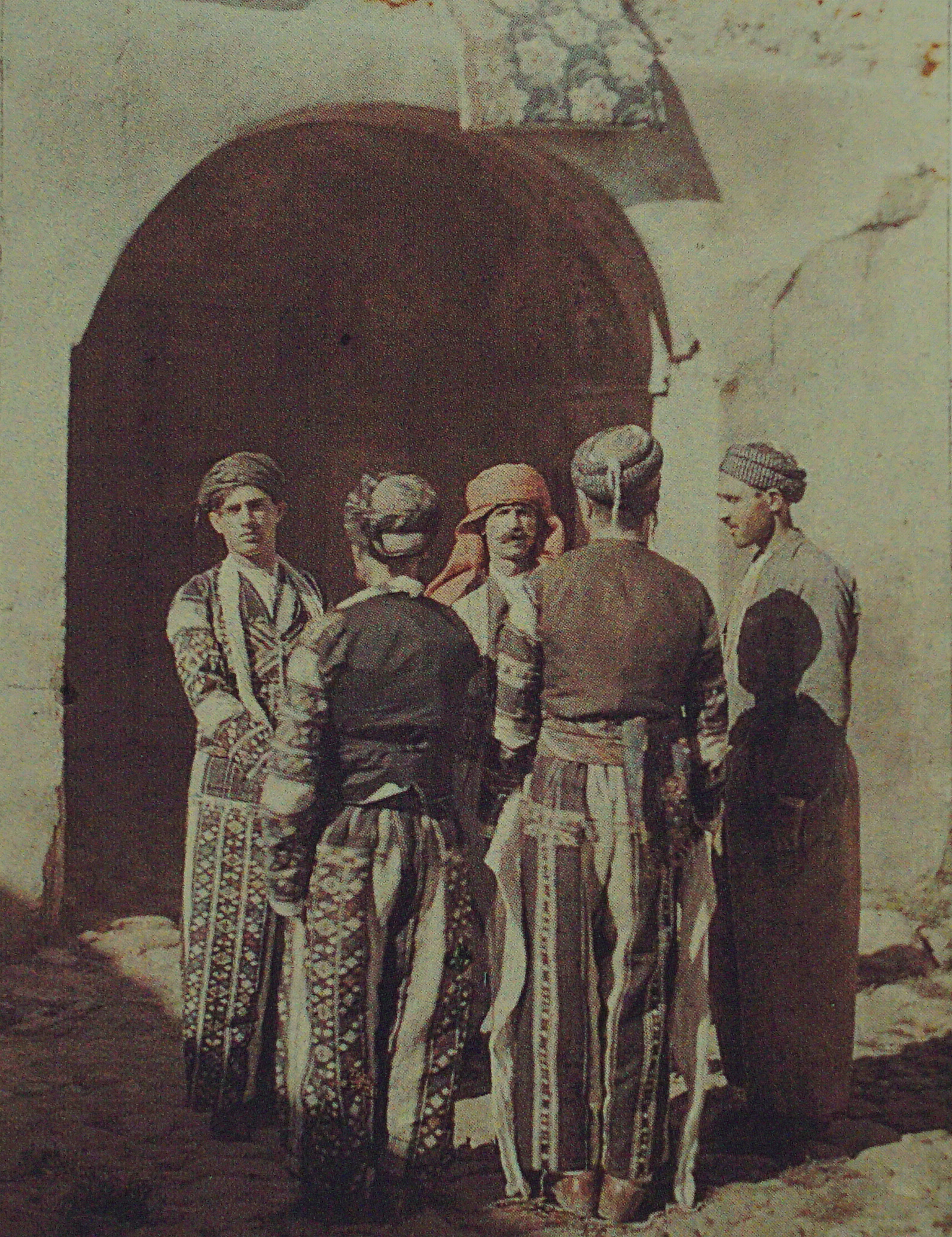
Zakho Kurds by Albert Kahn, 1910s

=== Southern Kurdish ===
The most common outfit, southern Kurdish clothing, is now widely used as a standard Kurdish costume across different regions. It was commonly worn by the Peshmerga. The attire includes baggy trousers, gathered at the waist and tapered at the ankle. The jacket is similar to the Central Kurdish style but lacks embroidery. The suits are usually in solid colors, sometimes with pinstripes. A sash of varying lengths and widths is worn around the waist. Headdresses vary by region but typically include a skullcap and a large, fringed square scarf worn as a turban. The scarf is often draped loosely, with a tail hanging down and fringes covering part of one eye. Southern Kurdish pants were baggy but fitted at the ankles, distinguishing them from the Luri pants further south which were baggy with a straight cut.

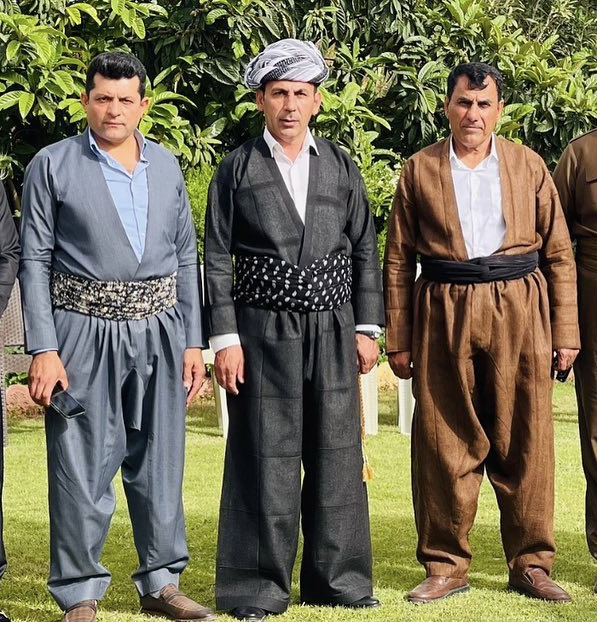
Kurdish men's style, South Kurdistan

== Women's clothing ==
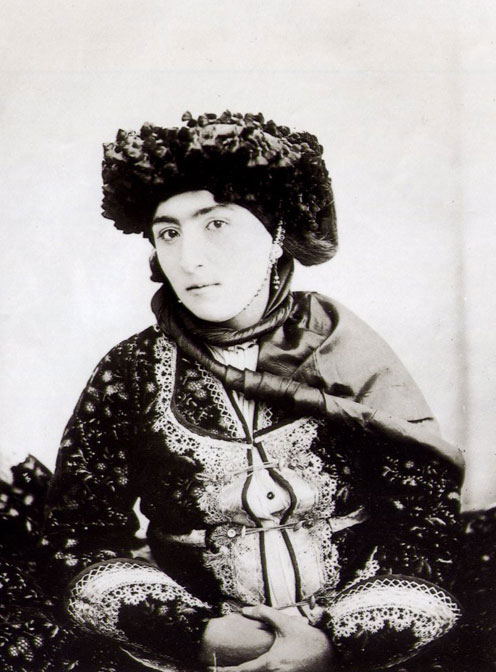
Kurdish woman in traditional attire

The traditional clothing of Kurdistan can be categorized into four main types for women. The East Anatolian type, now rare in Turkey, is still worn by Kurds in Khorasan, Iran, descendants of tribes deported in the 17th century. The Badinani or Hakkari costume is found in Southern Turkish Kurdistan, the Badinan region of Iraqi Kurdistan, and parts of northwestern Iran. The Sorani dress, the most widespread, is worn by Kurds living in the central and southern areas of Kurdistan. The Mahabad–Saqqez style is specific to the area between these two towns in Iranian Kurdistan and is notable for its distinct regional identity.

== See also ==
- Jamana, Kurdish headgear
- Kurdish culture
- Kurdish dance
