= 2024 Iran–Pakistan conflict =

2024 Iran–Pakistan clashes
- Part of the insurgency in Balochistan and Sistan and Baluchestan
- Locations of attacks in Pakistan (green) and Iran (red)
Date	16–18 January 2024 (2 days)
Location	Balochistan
Result	Ceasefire: Iran and Pakistan agree to de-escalation on 19 January

Belligerents
Iran; Claimed by Pakistan: Balochistan Liberation Army; Balochistan Liberation Front	Pakistan; Claimed by Iran: Jaysh al-Adl

Commanders and leaders
Hossein Salami; Amir Ali Hajizadeh	Asim Munir; Zaheer Ahmad Babar

Units involved
Iranian Armed Forces; Iranian Army; Air Defense Force; IRGC; Aerospace Force; Missile forces; Air Defence Forces	Pakistan Armed Forces; Pakistan Army; XII Corps; Artillery Regiment Corps; Air Defence Command; Pakistan Air Force; Southern Air Command; 39th Tactical Air Wing; 2nd Squadron ‘Minhasians’

Strength
300-600	500-700

Casualties and losses
- 9 foreign nationals killed in Iran (18 January); 2 killed and 4 wounded in Pakistan (16 January)

On 16 January 2024, Iran conducted a series of missile strikes in Pakistan with the stated aim of targeting militants of the Baloch separatist and Islamist extremist group Jaysh al-Adl in the Pakistani province of Balochistan. The attack occurred a day after a similar series of Iranian missile strikes in Iraq and Syria, which the Iranian government had stated were in response to the Kerman bombings by the Islamic State on 3 January. Pakistan's government condemned the strikes as an "unprovoked violation" of Pakistani airspace.

Two days later, on 18 January, Pakistan conducted a retaliatory series of missile strikes in Iran, asserting that it had targeted militants of the Balochistan Liberation Army (BLA) and the Balochistan Liberation Front (BLF) in the Iranian province of Sistan and Balochistan. Iran's government condemned the strikes and stated that nine people had been killed, including four children. Pakistani airstrikes marked the first known instance of a foreign country launching attacks on Iranian soil since the end of Iran–Iraq War in 1988.

Communicating through diplomatic channels on 19 January, both countries agreed to de-escalate and cooperate along the Iran–Pakistan border. Pakistan recalled the Iranian ambassador to Islamabad and reinstated the Pakistani ambassador in Tehran.

Foreign Minister of Iran Hossein Amir-Abdollahian visited Pakistan on 29 January 2024 at the invitation of Foreign Minister Jalil Abbas Jilani in a push to diffuse the standoff.

== Background ==
=== Iran–Pakistan border ===
The Iran–Pakistan border, spanning across Iran's Sistan and Baluchestan and Pakistan's Balochistan, faces significant challenges due to its high porosity, making it susceptible to extensive smuggling and terrorist activities, primarily orchestrated by Baloch insurgents. Despite maintaining a generally positive relationship, both countries have consistently accused each other of harboring terrorists and falling short in ensuring security on their respective sides of the border. These concerns prompted the establishment of the Iran–Pakistan border barrier, with construction commencing on the Iranian fortifications in 2011 and on the Pakistani fortifications in 2019.

=== Iranian missile strikes in Iraq and Syria ===
On 15 January 2024, Iran launched a barrage of 15 missiles directed at Iraq and Syria. Erbil, the capital of the Kurdistan Region, suffered most from the assault, with all but four missiles hitting the city. The remaining four struck Syria's Idlib Governorate, specifically targeting areas under the control of the Syrian opposition.

The Iranian government asserted that it aimed to strike Israel in Iraq by destroying the regional headquarters of Mossad. However, both the Iraqi government and the autonomous Kurdish government refuted this claim and condemned the attack. The Iranian missile attack occurred almost two weeks after the Kerman bombings, for which the Islamic State claimed responsibility.

== Iranian missile strikes in Pakistan ==
After conducting airstrikes in Iraq and Syria, the Islamic Revolutionary Guard Corps (IRGC) of Iran targeted Koh-e-Sabz, a locality in the Panjgur District of Pakistan's Balochistan province, which resulted in the death of two Pakistani nationals and injury of three. Pakistan swiftly denounced the attack, taking diplomatic measures by expelling the Iranian ambassador from Islamabad, recalling its own ambassador from Tehran, and issuing a stern warning to Iran regarding potential retaliatory actions.

Iran justified its actions by claiming that it had aimed at Jaish ul-Adl, a Baloch insurgent group involved in the Sistan and Baluchestan insurgency. This group had previously claimed responsibility for the 2019 Khash–Zahedan suicide bombing that targeted the IRGC.

== Pakistani strikes in Iran ==
On 18 January, In a tit for tat move, Pakistan launched a retaliatory strike, code-named Operation Marg Bar Sarmachar, carried out by the Pakistan Air Force and the Pakistan Army, using drones like the Wing Loong II, multiple rocket launchers like the Fatah MRLS, loitering munitions such as the YIHA-III, fighter jets such as the F-16s, JF-17s, and J-10Cs, along with other stand-off weapons against seven targets of the Balochistan Liberation Army and Balochistan Liberation Front terrorists in the Saravan city of Sistan and Baluchestan province of Iran. Pakistani aircraft and drones penetrated approximately 12 miles (20 km) into Iranian territory to target the militant hideouts. The Iranian Interior Minister at the time Ahmad Vahidi claimed nine foreign nationals were killed, including three women, four children and two men. Such Pakistani strikes were the first known instances of attacks on Iranian soil since the end of the Iran–Iraq War.

== Aftermath ==
Communicating through diplomatic channels on 19 January, both countries agreed to de-escalate and cooperate along the Iran–Pakistan border. Pakistan recalled the Iranian ambassador to Islamabad and reinstated the Pakistani ambassador in Tehran.

Iranian Foreign Minister Hossein Amir-Abdollahian visited Pakistan on 29 January 2024 at the invitation of Pakistani Foreign Minister Jalil Abbas Jilani in a push to diffuse the standoff.

The Balochistan Liberation Army acknowledged the deaths of its people in the operation and vowed "revenge" against the Pakistani state. On 30 January, the BLA claimed responsibility for a rocket and gun attack on Pakistani security forces in the town of Machh in the province of Balochistan, which left a police officer along with all 6 attackers dead, and left 15 police officers injured.

=== 2024 Saravan killings ===
On 27 January 2024, nine Pakistani labourers were killed and three were critically injured in the city of Saravan in the southeastern border region of Iran. The victims, who were labourers, lived at the auto repair shop where they worked. Unknown armed men entered a house and shot every Pakistani worker inside. The survivors told the police that three armed men were involved in the incident who fled after firing. No individual or group claimed responsibility for the shooting. This incident happened before the visit of Iranian Foreign Minister Hossein Amir-Abdollahian to Pakistan.

Five of the victims belonged to different areas of Alipur in Punjab province and had been working in Iran for the past decade. The relatives of the deceased reached the Assistant Commissioner's office and facilitated the transfer of the dead bodies to Pakistan. The families of the victims demanded the government to repatriate the remains of their loved ones to their native towns for burial. They protested and blocked the Alipur road.

The Iranian authorities had handed over the dead bodies of 9 Pakistani citizens to the authorities in Taftan on the Pak-Iran border on 1 February. Later, the bodies were flown to Punjab by a special plane from Juzak Airport in Sendak. While three injured Pakistanis were still undergoing treatment in a hospital in Iran.

== Analysis ==
According to the Atlantic Council, Pakistan's strikes against Iran were "well-measured" and left Iran "dazed and shocked." The Council goes on to state that Iran reluctantly agreed to de-escalate because it feared a military humiliation in the event of armed conflict with Pakistan due to Pakistan's traditional Western and Chinese military aid.

According to an article by The SAIS Review of International Affairs, China played a major role to mediate the conflict because of its long-standing partnership with both Iran and Pakistan. The article goes on to state that China values a cordial relationship between Iran and Pakistan to maintain its commercial interests in Central and South Asia. China has invested billions of dollars into Pakistan through the China–Pakistan Economic Corridor, in which it aims to connect itself to the Arabian Sea and build stronger trade networks with the Middle East. Moreover, China is Iran's largest buyer of oil despite international sanctions against Iran, and it signed the Iran–China 25-year Cooperation Program in 2021, which states that China will invest a large sum of US$400 billion in Iran's economy over that period. However, Michael Kugelman, an American foreign policy expert on South Asia, believes that Pakistan and Iran had enough of a pre-existing cordial relationship to resolve the conflict, and China simply provided a forum to ensure regional cooperation between the two nations.

In an article for Chatham House, Chietigji Bajpaee, senior research fellow for Chatham House's South Asia and Asia-Pacific programme, notes that Iran's actions against Pakistan are not directly connected to its actions in the Middle East due to the historically friendly relations between the two countries. Bajpaee notes that both Iran and Pakistan have worked to stabilize Afghanistan and put an end to the Afghan conflict. As a result of these factors, Bajpaee concludes that neither country sought a broader conflict; Iran was already tied up in the Middle Eastern crisis and suffering from an economic crisis, while Pakistan had to address an economic crisis, an upcoming general election, and political unrest.

According to Asfandyar Mir, a senior expert on South Asia at the US Institute of Peace, Iran's strikes against Pakistan potentially signaled a threat to rethink its alignment with the United States and not to provide any aid to the U.S. that could be used to counter Iran or its proxies. Mir further notes that Iran's refusal to retaliate against Pakistan's strikes on its territory signal that it wishes to avoid a tit-for-tat cycle of conflict with Pakistan, particularly because of Pakistan's superior military and such a conflict would allow Pakistan to regularly violate Iran's sovereignty and erode Iran's ability to deter other adversaries.

According to Madiha Afzal, fellow in the Foreign Policy program at the Brookings Institution, Iran's strikes united a politically polarized Pakistani society, and Pakistan's retaliatory strike "seems to have satisfied the Pakistani political class and public".

== See also ==
- 2021 Afghanistan–Iran clashes
- 2023 Afghanistan–Iran clash
- 2024 Pakistani airstrikes in Afghanistan
- 2025 India–Pakistan conflict
