= 2024 Iranian missile strikes in Pakistan =

Part of the Insurgency in Balochistan

- Part of the Insurgency in Balochistan, Sistan and Baluchestan insurgency and 2024 Iran–Pakistan conflict
- Type: Missile and drone attack
- Location: Koh-e-Sabz, Panjgur District, Balochistan, Pakistan; 27°10′N 64°16′E
- Planned by: Iran
- Target: Jaysh al-Adl
- Date: 16 January 2024
- Executed by: Islamic Revolutionary Guard Corps: Aerospace Force
- Outcome: Pakistan retaliates with Operation Marg Bar Sarmachar
- Casualties: 2 killed and 4 wounded in Pakistan

On 16 January 2024, Iran carried out a series of missile and drone strikes within Pakistan's Balochistan province, claiming that it had targeted the Iranian Baloch Sunni militant group Jaysh al-Adl. According to Pakistan, the strikes resulted in the deaths of two children and injured four people.

The incident occurred one day after Iran carried out aerial and drone strikes within Iraq and Syria, claiming that it had targeted the regional headquarters of the Israeli intelligence agency Mossad within Iraqi semi-autonomous Kurdish region and several strongholds of terrorist groups, in Taltita, Syria, in response to the Kerman bombings on 3 January, for which the Islamic State took responsibility and December 2023 killing of IRGC general Seyed Razi Mousavi. The Pakistani government condemned the attack, stating that Iran had killed two Pakistani nationals and calling it an "unprovoked violation" of Pakistan's airspace.

On 18 January, Pakistan conducted retaliatory airstrikes in Iran's Sistan and Baluchestan province, claiming it had struck hideouts belonging to Baloch separatist insurgents engaged in conflict against Pakistan. The Iranian government stated nine foreign citizens, including three women and four children, were killed in the airstrikes.

== Background ==
=== Insurgency in Sistan and Baluchistan ===
Since 2004, Iran's southeastern Sistan and Baluchestan province has been embroiled in a conflict with Baluch separatist groups, including Jaysh al-Adl. On 15 December 2023, a Jaysh al-Adl attack in the Iranian city of Rask left 11 policemen dead, according to Iranian media. Another attack by the group in 2019 killed 27 members of Iran's Islamic Revolutionary Guard Corps (IRGC).

=== Iranian missile strikes in Iraq and Syria ===
The attack came a day after an Iranian missile strike in Iraq and Syria, purportedly targeting terrorist groups in response to the Kerman bombings. It also occurred on the same day that Pakistan's caretaker Prime Minister Anwaar ul Haq Kakar and Iranian foreign minister Hossein Amir-Abdollahian were meeting during the World Economic Forum in Davos, Switzerland, and while joint exercises were being held by the Iranian and Pakistani navies in the Persian Gulf.

According to Pakistan, the attack was launched in retaliation for a missile strike carried out by Iran's Islamic Revolutionary Guard Corps in the border area of Pakistan's Balochistan province. The Iranian strike allegedly targeted the Jaish ul-Adl militant group on 16 January 2024, resulting in the deaths of two children and injuring four people, as reported by Pakistan.

== Attack ==
Iranian state TV said that the IRGC had used precision missiles and drone strikes to destroy two strongholds of Jaysh al-Adl in Pakistan's southwest Balochistan province. The attack targeted houses in the village of Koh-e-Sabz in Panjgur District, about 50 kilometres (31 mi) from the Iran–Pakistan border. Pakistan said that two were killed in the attack and four others were injured. It also said that between three and four drones were launched in the area, hitting a mosque, a house and other buildings.

Jaysh al-Adl claimed that six drones and rockets struck the residences of its fighters' families, killing two and injuring three.

== Aftermath ==
The day after the attack, IRGC Colonel Hossein Ali Javadanfar was assassinated by an unidentified gunman in Iranshahr, Sistan and Baluchestan province. Jaysh al-Adl claimed responsibility for the attack, according to reports from Iranian media.

=== Pakistani strikes in Iran ===
On 18 January, Pakistan conducted strikes inside Iran using drones like the Wing Loong II, multiple rocket launchers like the Fatah MRL, loitering munitions, F-16s, JF-17s, J-10Cs, and other stand-off weapons, claiming to have targeted Baloch militants at seven separate sites. A site in the city of Saravan was hit. Iranian officials claimed nine foreign nationals were killed, including three women and four children. A press release by the Pakistani Ministry of Foreign Affairs referred to the military action as Operation Marg Bar Sarmachar. Marg Bar Sarmachar means "death to insurgents". Marg Bar means "death to" in the Persian language, commonly used in the Iranian slogan Marg Bar Amrika. Sarmachar means "insurgents" or "guerrilla" in Balochi language; it is the term Baloch militants use as a self-appellation. Iran stated that those killed were foreign nationals. The Balochistan Liberation Army (BLA) confirmed that its members were killed in the Pakistani attack.

Pakistan's military claimed it carried out strikes against "terrorist hideouts" in Iran using "killer drones, rockets, loitering munitions and stand-off weapons". The attacks took place at 04:05 am Iranian Standard Time (IST) according to the deputy governor general of Sistan-Baluchestan province of Iran. TRT World, citing a senior intelligence source, reported that seven separate locations of Baloch separatist groups in the Iranian city of Saravan in Sistan and Baluchestan province. Pakistan didn't provide further details of the attack, however, Pakistani defense and aerospace publication Global Defense Insight claimed YIHA-III loitering munitions were used in the attack. Similarly, Janes speculated JF-17 and F-16 fighter jets, alongside Bayraktar TB2 and Burraq drones were used. Defence Security Asia sepeculted the use of J-10C fighter jets and Wing Loong II drones alongside the JF-17 fighter jets.

Iran said that nine people were killed during the attack, including four children, three women, and two men, who were non-Iranians. Sources in the Pakistani military said that its aircraft and drones penetrated approximately 20 kilometres (12 miles) into Iranian territory to target the militant hideouts. Such Pakistani strikes were the first known instances of attacks on Iranian soil since the end of the Iran–Iraq War. The Balochistan Liberation Army acknowledged the deaths of its people in the operation and vowed "revenge" against the Pakistani state.

On 18 January 2024, Pakistan launched a series of air and artillery strikes inside Iran's Sistan and Baluchestan province, targeting Baloch separatist groups, codenamed Operation Marg Bar Sarmachar (Urdu: آپریشن مرگ بر سرمچار, lit. 'Death to Insurgents') (Note: 'Marg bar' is a Persian term meaning 'death to'. 'Sarmachar' is a Balochi word that loosely translates to guerrilla fighter. The word refers to Baloch separatist insurgents operating in the cross-border region.) by Pakistan. The attack was launched in response to the Iranian missile strikes in Pakistan's Balochistan province, one day earlier. Pakistani aircraft and drones penetrated approximately 12 miles (20 km) into Iranian territory to target the militant hideouts. Such strikes were the first known instances of attacks on Iranian soil since the end of the Iran–Iraq War. This attack marked the first known instance of a foreign country launching an attack on Iranian soil since the end of the Iran–Iraq War in 1988.

On 19 January, Pakistan's caretaker prime minister Anwaar ul Haq Kakar announced that normal diplomatic relations with Iran had been restored, following a foreign ministry statement that said that the two sides had agreed to de-escalate the conflict. On 29 January, Iranian foreign minister Hossein Amir-Abdollahian visited Pakistan as part of efforts to de-escalate tensions following the attacks.

== Reactions ==
=== Pakistan ===
Pakistan condemned what it called was an "unprovoked violation of its airspace by Iran", stating that it was "even more concerning that this illegal act has taken place despite the existence of several channels of communication between Pakistan and Iran". On 17 January, Pakistan recalled its ambassador to Iran. A foreign ministry spokesperson expressed that the attack represented a blatant breach of Pakistan's sovereignty and deemed it "unacceptable," adding that Pakistan retained the right to respond to this "illegal" act. Pakistan also prohibited the Iranian ambassador from returning to his post.

The Ministry of Foreign Affairs said that Pakistan "undertook a series of highly coordinated and specifically targeted precision military strikes against terrorist hideouts" that killed "a number of terrorists" in an operation codenamed "Marg Bar Sarmachar", adding that the attacks were launched due to "lack of action" by Iran regarding the presence of "Pakistani origin terrorists" on its soil. According to the Pakistani military's Inter-Services Public Relations, the targeted hideouts were being used by militants from the Baluchistan Liberation Army (BLA) and the Baluch Liberation Front (BLF), including, among others, Dosta alias chairman, Bajjar alias Soghat, Sahil alias Shafaq, Asghar alias Basham, and Wazir alias Wazi.

Following the attack, caretaker Prime Minister Anwaar ul Haq Kakar cut short his attendance at the World Economic Forum in Davos, Switzerland and returned home to convene an emergency meeting of the National Security Council on 19 January. Foreign minister Jalil Abbas Jilani, who was on a visit to Uganda, also cut short his visit and returned to Pakistan.

On 19 January Anwaar ul Haq Kakar announced that normal diplomatic relations with Iran had been restored, following a foreign ministry statement that said that there was agreement to de-escalate the conflict.

=== Iran ===
Defence minister Mohammad-Reza Gharaei Ashtiani said in a televised speech that "It doesn't make a difference for us where the Islamic Republic is being threatened from, we will have a proportionate, decisive and firm reaction." Foreign Minister Hossein Amir-Abdollahian clarified the strikes targeted an "Iranian terrorist group" and that "none of the nationals of the friendly and brotherly country of Pakistan were targeted by Iranian missiles and drones".

The Foreign Ministry condemned the attack on its territory and summoned the Pakistani chargé d'affaires to provide an explanation about the incident. The Iranian government was heavily criticized on social media for its weak response against the attacks, its description of the dead as non-Iranians and initial downplaying of the incident. On 29 January, foreign minister Hossein Amir-Abdollahian visited Pakistan as part of efforts to de-escalate tensions following the attacks.

=== Other countries ===
- Afghanistan: The Taliban called the attacks in Pakistan and Iran "alarming", calling for both sides to exercise restraint.
- China: Foreign Ministry spokeswoman Mao Ning urged Iran and Pakistan to show "restraint" and "avoid actions that would lead to an escalation of tension" while adding that both countries are regarded as "close neighbours" of Beijing. The Government of China offered to mediate between Pakistan and Iran and hoped that both sides exercise calm and restraint and avoid an escalation of tensions.
- Japan: The Government of Japan appealed for restraint.
- Russia: The Foreign Ministry called on Pakistan and Iran to show maximum restraint and to solve their differences through diplomatic resolutions, or risk playing into the hands of those who would like to see the region descend into chaos. The Ministry of Foreign Affairs expressed concern over the "escalation of the situation in the Iran–Pakistan border area" and called on the two countries to "exercise maximum restraint and to resolve emerging issues exclusively through political and diplomatic means."
- Turkey: The Government of Turkey called for calm and recommended that the sides do not escalate further and that calm should be restored as soon as possible.
- United States: The State Department condemned the Iranian attack, noting that Iran had violated "the sovereign borders of three of its neighbours in just the past couple days". The State Department said there was "no need for escalation" of the tensions.
- India: The Ministry of External Affairs released an official statement declaring the country's neutrality towards "a matter between Iran and Pakistan" and also highlighted the Indian government's "uncompromising position of zero tolerance towards terrorism" while explaining that it understands "actions that countries take in their self-defence" against terrorist entities.

=== Supranational organizations ===
- European Union: The bloc expressed "utmost concern" over the Iranian attack as well as the Pakistani attack the following day, saying that "they violate the sovereignty and territorial integrity of countries" and produce "a destabilising effect on the region."
- United Nations: Secretary-General António Guterres called on Iran and Pakistan to "exercise maximum restraint", saying that he was deeply concerned about the exchange of military strikes between the two countries.
