= 2024 Iranian missile strikes in Iraq and Syria =

Series of Iranian missile strikes in Iraq and Syria

- Part of the Kurdish–Iranian conflict, the Iran–Israel proxy conflict, and the Iranian-led attacks on American troops in Iraq and Syria
- Type: Missile and drone attack
- Locations: Erbil, Kurdistan Region, Iraq; 36°18′18″N 44°07′56″E (Note: Per Rudaw and White Helmets); Taltita, Idlib Governorate, Syria; 36°06′32″N 36°33′13″E
- Planned by: Iranian government
- Target: Headquarters of Israel's Mossad in Iraq (Iranian claim, rejected by Iraq and Israel) and terrorist strongholds in Syria
- Date: 15 January 2024; 11:36 p.m. (UTC+03:00)
- Executed by: Islamic Revolutionary Guard Corps: Aerospace Force
- Casualties: 4 civilians killed 17 civilians injured

On 15 January 2024, Iran carried out a series of aerial and drone strikes within Iraq and Syria, claiming that it had targeted the regional headquarters of the Israeli intelligence agency Mossad and several strongholds of terrorist groups in response to the Kerman bombings on 3 January, for which the Islamic State took responsibility. The city of Erbil, which is the capital of Iraq's Kurdistan Region, was the target of 11 of the 15 total missiles that were fired. The remaining four missiles were directed at Syria's Idlib Governorate, targeting areas held by the Syrian opposition. In Erbil itself, the Iranian attack killed four civilians and injured 17 others. Iran's claims of having targeted the Israeli presence in Kurdistan and terrorist groups in Syria were rejected by the Iraqi government and the autonomous Kurdish government, both of which condemned the attack.

== Background ==
On 3 January 2024 a commemorative ceremony marking the assassination of Qasem Soleimani at his grave in Kerman, Iran, was attacked by two bomb explosions. The attacks killed at least 94 people, and injured 284 others. The Islamic State later claimed responsibility for the attacks. Ayatollah Ali Khamenei, the supreme leader of Iran, pledged a "hard response" to the attack and declared that those responsible "will be the definite target of repression and just punishment from now on".

== Attacks ==
=== Iraqi Kurdistan ===
The attack in Erbil targeted the residence of Peshraw Dizayee – a Peshmerga veteran of the 2003 US special operations in northern Iraq and former intelligence contractor to the Coalition Provisional Authority, a senior member of the Kurdistan Democratic Party with close ties to the Barzani family and the founder and owner of Falcon Group, a conglomerate active in real estate development through its Empire World project modelled on Dubai, in providing security to Western representatives and international oil companies, and in the Iraq–Europe Development Road project – killing him along with his daughter, their housekeeper, and businessman Karam Mikhail. Dizayee was alleged by Iran to have run the Mossad base in Erbil, helped export oil from the Kurdistan Region to Israel, and led a private army comprising former US soldiers. Erbil International Airport was temporarily closed. The Islamic Revolutionary Guard Corps (IRGC) quickly took responsibility. In addition, coalition forces shot down three drones near the airport. Tasnim News Agency revealed that four ballistic missiles launched from Kermanshah province and seven others fired from West Azarbaijan province were used during the attack. Radio Free Europe reported that Kheibar Shekan missiles were used in the strike, while Iran Watch and NDTV said that Fateh-110 short-range ballistic missiles were likely used.

=== Syria ===
The IRGC claimed it also struck Islamic State forces in northwestern Syria with four missiles, specifically targeting the perpetrators of the 2024 Kerman bombings on 3 January. Tasnim News Agency reported that the IRGC Aerospace Force launched four Kheibar Shekan medium-range ballistic missiles from Darkhoveyn District in Khuzestan province at midnight, traveling a distance of 1,200 kilometres (750 mi) to hit targets near Taltita in Idlib Governorate.

According to the Syrian Observatory for Human Rights, Iran was unlikely to have conducted its attack in Syria using medium-range ballistic missiles given on the limited scale of damage. Instead, the observatory stated that the attack was likely carried out by Iranian-backed groups situated in Aleppo Governorate in Syria, approximately 30 kilometres (19 mi) from the impact zone.

== Aftermath ==
A day after the attack in Iraq and Syria, Iran carried out a similar series of missile strikes in Pakistan, claiming that it had targeted Jaish ul-Adl, a Baloch militant group that had claimed responsibility for the 2019 Khash–Zahedan suicide bombing in Iran. These strikes were condemned by the Pakistani government, which expelled the Iranian ambassador from Islamabad and stated that the strikes had killed two children in Balochistan, subsequently vowing to respond to Iran's violation of Pakistani airspace.

== Reactions ==
=== Iraq and Iraqi Kurdistan ===
An Iraqi government source said that it was not informed in advance of the attack and that an emergency meeting would be held. He described the attack as a flagrant violation of the Iranian–Iraqi agreement. Moreover, the Kurdistan Region called on the Iraqi government and the international community not to remain silent regarding the attack on Erbil. Following the attack, Iraq recalled its ambassador in Tehran for consultations and summoned the Iranian chargé d'affaires in Baghdad.

=== Iran ===
The IRGC said that the attack was a response to the Israeli assassination of "resistance elements".

=== Other countries ===
The attacks were condemned by the United States, United Kingdom, Canada, Germany, France, Japan and the Netherlands. Pope Francis condemned the attacks, stating "good relations between neighbors are not built with such actions, but with dialogue and cooperation".

=== International organizations ===
NATO secretary-general Jens Stoltenberg denounced the attack on Erbil during a conversation with Iraqi prime minister Mohammed Shia' Al Sudani during the World Economic Forum in Davos, Switzerland. The Arab League and the Arab Parliament condemned the attack, calling it an "assault on Arab National security".

== See also ==
- 2021 Erbil rocket attacks
- 2022 Erbil missile attacks
- 2024 Iranian missile strikes in Pakistan
