= 2024 Saravan killings =

Terrorist attack on Pakistanis in Iran

- Location: Saravan, Iran
- Date: 27 January 2024
- Target: Pakistanis
- Deaths: 9
- Injuries: 3
- Perpetrator: Unidentified gunmen

On 27 January 2024, nine Pakistani labourers were killed and three were critically injured in the city of Saravan in the southeastern border region of Iran. The victims, who were labourers, lived at the auto repair shop where they worked. The incident came amid efforts by Iran and Pakistan to mend relations after recent tit-for-tat attacks.

== Incident ==
Unknown armed men entered a house and shot every Pakistani worker inside. The survivors told the police that three armed men were involved in the incident who fled after firing. No individual or group claimed responsibility for the shooting. This incident happened before the visit of Iranian Foreign Minister Hossein Amir-Abdollahian to Pakistan.

Five of the victims belonged to different areas of Alipur in Punjab province and had been working in Iran for the past decade. The relatives of the deceased reached the Assistant Commissioner's office and facilitated the transfer of the dead bodies to Pakistan.

The Iranian authorities had handed over the dead bodies of 9 Pakistani citizens to the authorities in Taftan on the Pak-Iran border on 1 February. Later, the bodies were flown to Punjab by a special plane from Juzak Airport in Sendak. While three injured Pakistanis were still undergoing treatment in a hospital in Iran.

== Reactions ==
Pakistani Ambassador to Iran Muhammad Mudassir Tipu expressed deep shock over the deaths and assured that the embassy would provide all possible assistance to the bereaved families. He urged Iran to fully cooperate in this matter.

Mumtaz Zahra Baloch, Spokesperson of Pakistan's Ministry of Foreign Affairs, while condemning the incident, emphasised the need for immediate investigation of the incident and the need to bring the people involved to justice.

The spokesperson of the Iranian Foreign Ministry strongly condemned the incident and assured that the Iranian authorities are fully investigating the incident. He also stressed that both Iran and Pakistan are determined not to let their enemies disrupt their brotherly ties.

Pakistan's Caretaker Foreign Minister Jalil Abbas Jilani described the attack as an attempt to spoil relations between Pakistan and Iran.

Iran's ambassador to Pakistan Reza Amiri Moghaddam expressed condolences to Pakistan over the incident.

=== Victims’ families protest ===
The families of the victims demanded the government to repatriate the remains of their loved ones to their native towns for burial. They protested and blocked the Alipur road.
