= Kheibar Shekan =

Iranian medium-range ballistic missile

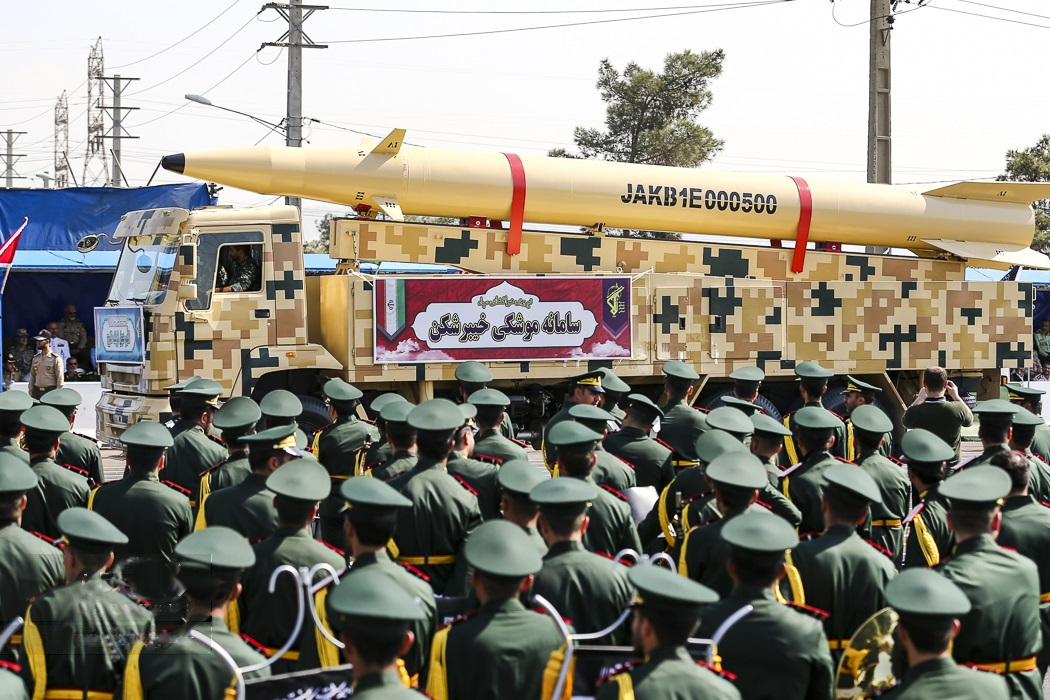
- Type: Medium-range ballistic missile
- Place of origin: Iran

Service history
- Used by: Islamic Republic of Iran
- Wars: War on ISIL; 2024 Iran–Israel conflict 2026 Iran war

Production history
- Manufacturer: IRGCASF
- Produced: 2022

Specifications
- Propellant: Solid fuel engine

Kheibar Shekan (Persian: خیبرشکن; also transliterated Kheybar Shekan or Kheibarshekan) is an Iranian solid-fuel medium-range ballistic missile operated by the Islamic Revolutionary Guard Corps Aerospace Force. It is part of the Fateh-110 missile family and was unveiled in February 2022. The missile is propelled by solid fuel and its warhead is maneuverable in terminal phase with the objective of evading air defenses. The range is 1450 km, or about 900 mi.

Kheibar Sheken missiles have been used throughout the 2026 Iran war. American newspaper WSJ described the Kheibar Shekan as "cheap, accurate and lethal," as the "workhorse" of Iran's ballistic missile forces, and as "Iran's best missile."

== Name ==
"Kheibar" refers to a fort near Medina, Khaybar, which was populated by Arabian Jews and was in 628 CE conquered by Muslims led by the prophet Muhammad. "Shekan" means "shatterer" or "destroyer". More idiomatically, the name can be translated as "fortress breaker."

== Specifications ==
The Kheibar Shekan missile uses solid fuel and, according to Iran, weighs less than similar missiles; Iran did not disclose the type it was being compared against. It is considered part of the Fateh-110 family of missiles. It was unveiled in February 2022 at a ceremony attended by Iranian military commanders on the 43rd anniversary of the Iranian Revolution.

=== Dimensions ===
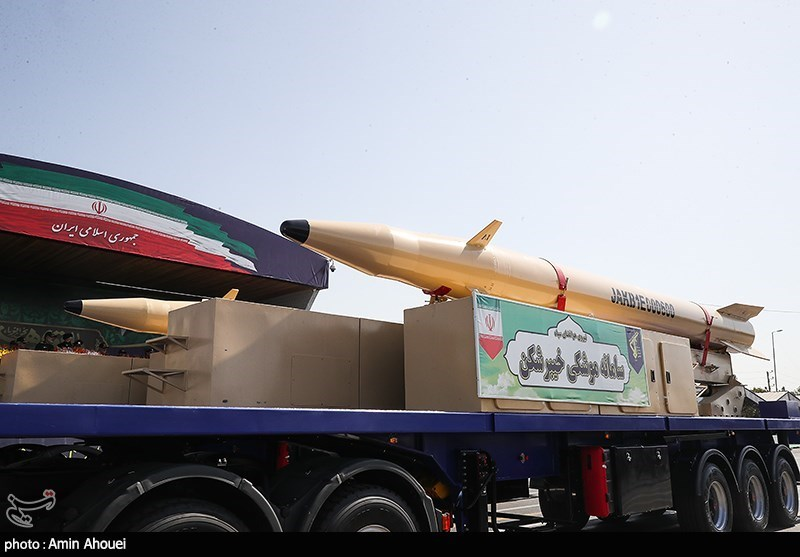
Kheibar Shekan in 2023

The dimensions of the Kheibar Shekan missile have not been not disclosed. Two Iranian news websites estimated the dimensions as ~10.5 meters long, 80 centimeters in diameter, and 4500 kg weight. A German source estimated the length at 11.8m and the width as 0.81m. Its warhead is high explosive type and its body is made of the same composite materials as the Raad-500 missile. According to IRGC-affiliated media, an advantage of the Kheibar Shekan missile over others is its smaller size, allowing more to be stored in the limited space of underground missile bases.

=== Warhead ===
At unveiling in 2022, the warhead weight was not disclosed. Islamic World News, an Iran-aligned media outlet, estimated the warhead weight as 500 kg. IISS reported a warhead weight of 550kg in 2025. In 2026, the WSJ reported a payload of 990-1300 lbs (~450-600 kg).

According to IRGC-affiliated media, the prominent nose fins of the re-entry vehicle increase the maneuverability after re-entering the atmosphere and allow for faster and more complex maneuvers to attempt to defeat missile defenses. Iranian state media estimates the velocity of the warhead at the moment of impact at Mach 2-3. The reentry vehicle's configuration is of the tri-conic type, which maintains the warhead's stability during re-entry. According to Iranian state media sources the missile has achieved more maneuverability by making engineering compromises and increasing the drag. According to the WSJ, some Kheybar Shekan variants have a warhead-bearing nose section with a small engine that can adjust trajectory during the terminal phase of flight. Iran had earlier claimed such a maneuvering capability at the missile's introduction in 2022.

=== Launch vehicle ===
According to IRNA, the Kheibar Shekan missile can use a wide range of launchers. The launcher used for the missile is mounted on a 10-wheel commercial chassis that can also be camouflaged as a commercial vehicle.

Casting of missile motors takes place at Iran's Shahroud missile facility in Semnan Province.

== Operational history ==
Iran has believed to have supplied the missile to the Houthis. In a military parade in Yemen on 21 September 2022, the Houthis unveiled a missile called "Hatim" of similar appearance to the Kheibar Shekan.

The first use in combat was on 15 January 2024, when the IRGC used four Kheibar Shekan missiles to strike a reported Islamic State target in Idlib governorate in northwestern Syria. The missiles were fired from a location near Darkhoveyn in southern Khuzestan, about 1250 km away. Tehran stated that this was their longest missile strike. The New York Times said that both the range and accuracy were notable. In 2024, Bloomberg News described the Kheibar Shekan as the most advanced Iranian missile with the range to strike Israel.

On 1 October 2024, Iran launched 181 ballistic missiles at Israel in response to Israel's assassination of Hassan Nasrallah and IRGC commander Abbas Nilforoushan on 27 September. Kheibar Shekan missiles were among those reportedly used in the attack. In response, on 26 October 2024, Israel struck military targets in Iran, including multiple facilities used to manufacture and store the solid propellant fuel for Kheibar Shekan missiles.

Kheibar Shekan missiles were used extensively in the 2026 Iran war. Kheibar Shekan missiles were "likely" used in an attack on Muwaffaq Salti Air Base in Jordan that killed three American servicemembers on 17 July 2026. According to a Wall Street Journal report, Iran used the missile in complex attacks involving different flight paths, manoeuvres, and speeds intended to confuse air defence systems. Iran's tactics and deployment of Kheibar Shekan missiles evolved through the war, reported the WSJ, and some of the missiles successfully evaded US defenses.

== See also ==
- Ballistic missile program of Iran
- Khaybar Khaybar ya yahud
