= Girl in the pink jacket =

Young girl killed in the 2024 Kerman bombings

Reyhaneh Soltaninejad
- ریحانه سلطانی‌نژاد
- Born: c. 2022
- Died: 3 January 2024; Kerman, Iran
- Other name: دختر کاپشن صورتی (Persian nickname)
- Known for: Symbol of the 2024 Kerman terrorist bombings; widely known by her nickname "دختر کاپشن صورتی" (Girl in the pink jacket)

Reyhaneh Soltaninejad (c. 2022 – January 3, 2024), nicknamed the girl in the pink jacket (Persian: دختر کاپشن صورتی, romanized: dokhtar kāpšen surati), or the girl with a pink jacket and heart earrings, was a one-and-a-half-year-old girl who became a symbol of the 2024 terrorist attacks in Kerman, Iran, which was carried out by the Islamic State. Identified by her distinctive pink jacket and heart-shaped earrings, she was killed along with her mother, Fatemeh Soltaninejad, her brother Mohammad Amin, and five other family members. According to the Tehran Times, after the incident, a picture circulated on the internet showing a brief text inscribed on a small body bag: "Body parts, girl in pink jacket, heart-shaped earrings, probably 2 years old." An emergency worker had hastily written these words to help identify the victim amid the incident.

== Bombings ==
On January 3, 2024, a pair of bombings occurred on the road to the Martyrs' Cemetery in Kerman, resulting in the death of at least 103 people and injuring around 284 others. The attacks took place during a memorial event for Qasem Soleimani, held on the fourth anniversary of his death from an American drone strike ordered by then U.S. President Donald Trump. The first explosion occurred near the grave of Soleimani. Twenty minutes later, a second, even more deadly, explosion occurred after crowds gathered to assist those wounded from the first. Soon after the bombing, the Islamic State claimed responsibility.

== Reyhaneh's death ==
According to one of Reyhaneh's acquaintances, Reyhaneh and several other children were meant to stay at a pavilion while their mothers visited the Martyrs' Cemetery. In the afternoon, after returning, the first explosion occurred some distance away from the pavilion. The children's uncle quickly gathered his wife, his children, his sisters, and their children into a car to drive them home. They went to the parking area where the second explosion happened. Believing it was safe, he left them in the car and returned to help at the first explosion site. The second explosion occurred as his wife, sisters, and children headed towards their car to leave. Reyhaneh was killed along with her mother Fatemeh, her brother, Mohammad Amin, and five other family members.

A picture circulated on the internet after the incident featuring a short text on a small body bag: "Body parts, girl in pink jacket, heart-shaped earrings, probably 2 years old." The description was hastily written by an emergency worker to help identify the victim amid the incident. The author of the sentence on Reyhaneh's bag was a forensic doctor, who, in an interview with Kerman Police Information Center, described a heart-wrenching moment when the bodies of the victims were brought for identification, evoking tears from everyone present. He stated that among the victims, the two-year-old girl's lifeless body stood out the most, due to the explosion's intensity making her identity difficult to ascertain. She was identified by the color of her clothes and the marks of her small body. The identifier compared her death to the oppression faced by the survivors of Karbala. Reflecting on his notes from the identification process, he recalled writing, "A girl with a pink jacket and heart earrings".

== In arts ==
In January 2025, a painting by Iranian artist Hassan Ruholamin was unveiled at a ceremony attended by Ayatollah Khamenei, the leader of the Islamic Revolution, and the residents of Qom. The artwork, entitled "The Two-Year-Old Girl with a Pink Jacket and Heart-Shaped Earrings," depicts the toddler's fate and the loss experienced by her family. Hamshahri Online published artificial intelligence art of Qasem Soleimani holding Reyhaneh in front of a number of missiles.
