= 2024 Kerman bombings =

Suicide bombings in Iran

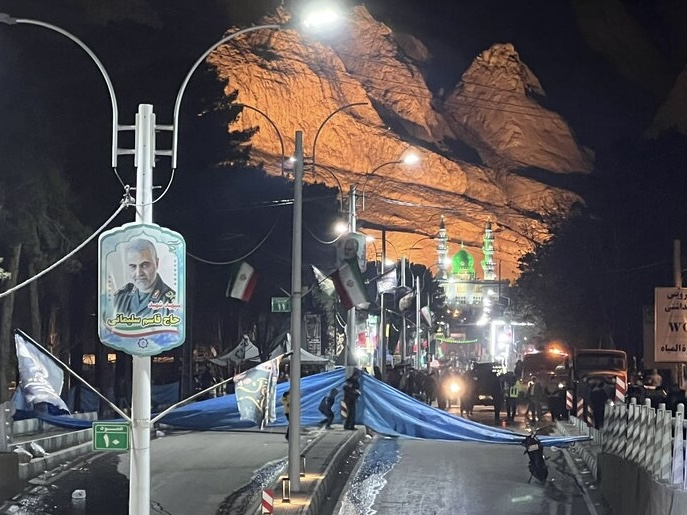
- The site of the bombings on the route towards the Martyrs' Cemetery with the dome of the Saheb al-Zaman mosque visible in the background
- Location: 30.2783°N 57.1208°E; Kerman, Iran
- Date: 3 January 2024; 15:50–16:00 IRST (UTC+03:30)
- Target: 1
- Attack type: Suicide bombings
- Deaths: 103 (+2 suicide bombers)
- Injuries: 284
- Perpetrator: Islamic State – Khorasan Province

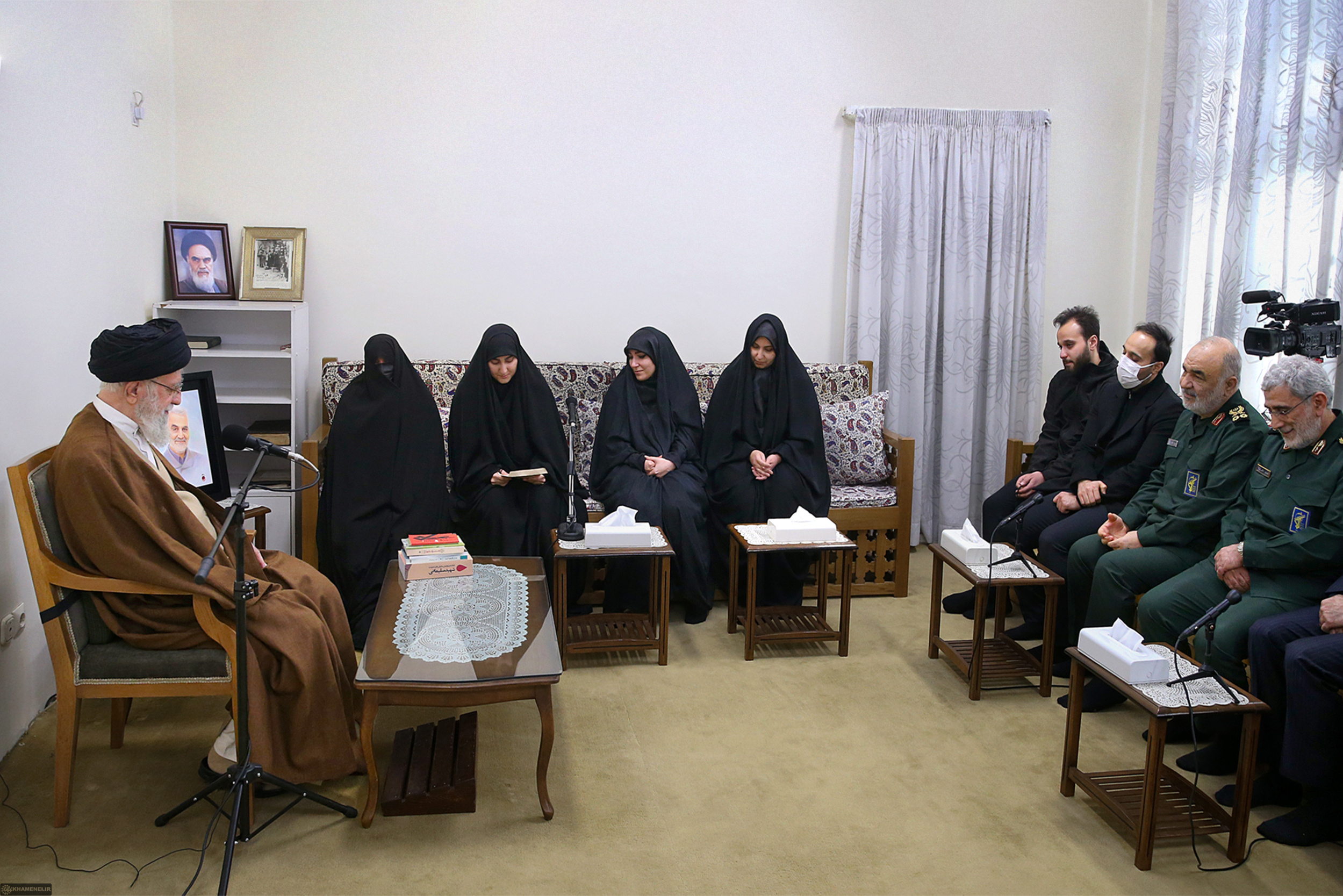
Supreme Leader Ayatollah Ali Khamenei meeting with Qasem Soleimani's family two days before the bombings.

On 3 January 2024, a commemorative ceremony marking the assassination of Qasem Soleimani at his grave in eastern Kerman, Iran, was attacked by two bomb explosions. The attacks killed at least 95 people, and injured 284 others. The Iranian government declared the bombings a terrorist attack, the deadliest such incident in the country since the Cinema Rex attack of 1978. On the following day, the Islamic State, a Sunni extremist group, claimed responsibility for the attack in the Shia dominated country. According to Reuters, the United States Intelligence Community concluded that the attack was perpetrated by the Afghanistan branch of the Islamic State, Islamic State – Khorasan Province.

== Background ==
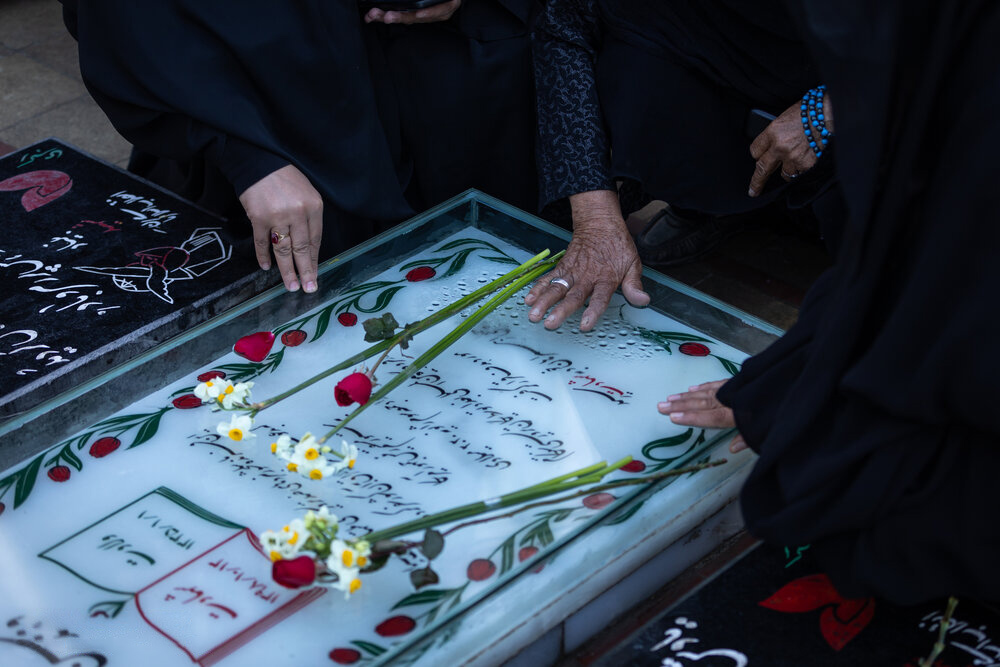
The grave of Qasem Soleimani at the Martyrs' Cemetery in Kerman, 2021

On 3 January 2020, General Qasem Soleimani was killed by a United States drone attack in Iraq. Soleimani was the commander of the Quds Force of the IRGC. Soleimani held a position of significant influence in Iran, widely considered the second most powerful figure in the country after Supreme Leader Ayatollah Ali Khamenei. As leader of the Quds Force, the overseas operations arm of the IRGC, he played a key role in shaping Iranian policy across the region. Soleimani was responsible for overseeing clandestine missions and providing guidance, funding, weapons, intelligence, and logistical support to allied governments and armed groups, including Hamas and Hezbollah.

During the burial procession for Soleimani in Kerman on 7 January 2020, a stampede occurred, killing at least 50 mourners and causing injuries to over 200 individuals. The 2024 attack came amidst heightened tensions in the Middle East following the Gaza war and its spillover conflicts. A day before the bombings, an Israeli drone strike in Lebanon killed Hamas's deputy leader Saleh al-Arouri, while a week prior, an Israeli airstrike killed Iranian Brigadier General Sayyed Razi Mousavi in Syria. Into the 2020s, the Islamic State and other Sunni extremist groups have launched similar attacks in the Shiite-majority country, including a mass shooting that killed 13 people in Shiraz in 2022.

=== U.S. warning to Iran ===
Prior to ISIS' terrorist attack on 3 January 2024, in Kerman, Iran, the US government provided Iran with a private warning that there was a terrorist threat within Iranian borders. The US government followed a longstanding 'duty to warn' policy that has been implemented across administrations to warn governments against potential lethal threats. We provide these warnings in part because we do not want to see innocent lives lost in terror attacks.

— A U.S. official, quoted by CNN

The United States secretly warned Iran about intelligence that the Islamic State was planning a potential terror attack inside Iran's borders before the deadly 3 January bombings in Kerman, according to a U.S. official. The private warning was based on U.S. intelligence about ISIS' plans and was provided to Iran based on the U.S. government's "duty to warn" policy, which applies even to adversaries, to warn about potential lethal threats.

The warning from the U.S. to Iran is notable not only because Iran is a U.S. adversary, but also because of recent Iranian proxy attacks on U.S. personnel in the Middle East. However, the U.S. official stated the warning was provided "in part because we do not want to see innocent lives lost in terror attacks."

Despite the U.S. warning, Iran was ultimately unable to stop the 3 January ISIS attack, which killed at least 84 people and was the deadliest such incident in the country since the Iranian Revolution in 1979.

According to the Office of the Director of National Intelligence, the "duty to warn" policy requires the U.S. intelligence community to warn intended victims, including non-U.S. persons, about "credible and specific" threats of intentional killing, serious injury or kidnapping.

== Bombings ==
The twin explosions struck a procession going towards Soleimani's grave in the Golzar Shohada (Garden of Martyrs) cemetery, around the Saheb al-Zaman mosque, to commemorate the fourth anniversary of his death. The first explosion occurred 700 metres from Soleimani's grave near a parking lot, while the second occurred one kilometre away at Shohada Street, where many had fled. The explosives were placed in such a manner as to prevent their detection at the security gates. The explosions occurred between 10 and 20 minutes apart.

According to Iranian media reports, the attack was carried out using two briefcase bombs placed at the entrance that were detonated remotely. A witness said one of the bombs was placed inside a trash bin. Another bomb was reportedly placed inside a car. However, the state news agency IRNA reported on 4 January that investigators suspected that the attacks were carried out by suicide bombers. The deputy governor of Kerman province said the incident was a terrorist attack.

At least 94 people were killed and at least another 284 were injured, 27 of them critically. The dead included 23 students, 14 Afghan nationals and three paramedics who responded to the site of the first explosion and were caught in the second blast. Most of the casualties were believed to have been caused by the second explosion. Several of the injured were trampled in the panic that followed the explosions. Early reports quoting Iranian officials put the death toll at 103, but authorities later revised the count down to 89.

== Aftermath ==
IRIB showed Red Crescent rescuers assisting injured individuals at the ceremony. Several Iranian news agencies reported a higher count of wounded individuals. Reza Fallah, the head of the provincial Red Crescent, stated that their rapid response teams were evacuating the injured, but faced challenges due to waves of crowds obstructing roads. Hospitals in Kerman and surrounding areas were placed on alert to treat victims.

In the evening following the explosion, crowds gathered at the Golzar Shohada cemetery chanting "Death to Israel" and "Death to America".

A mass funeral for the victims of the attack was held at the Emam Ali mosque in Kerman on 5 January, with Iranian president Ebrahim Raisi and IRGC commander Hossein Salami in attendance. On the same day, authorities called for mass rallies against the bombings following the funerals and Friday prayers.

Two days after the attack, Iran's Ministry of Interior ordered walls to be built on its borders with Afghanistan and Pakistan.

On 15 and 16 January 2024, Iran launched missile attacks at Iraq, Syria, and Pakistan, describing them as retaliatory attacks in response to the bombing. "#Pink Jacket" was written in Persian on one of the missiles, referring to Reyhaneh Soltaninejad, a toddler who was killed in the 2024 attack while wearing a pink jacket.

== Suspect arrested ==
The Iranian Ministry of Intelligence has announced the detention of a key figure believed to be behind the deadly terrorist bombings that struck the city of Kerman earlier this year.

In a statement released on July 13, 2024, the ministry said it had apprehended "one of the ring leaders and main plotters" of the attacks, identifying him as Abdullah Quetta.

According to the statement, the intelligence obtained from Quetta has played a "significant role" in uncovering "many Takfiri conspiracies" and identifying other major elements involved in the plot.

== Reactions ==
=== Domestic ===
Ayatollah Ali Khamenei, the Supreme Leader of Iran, pledged a "hard response" to the attack and declared that those responsible "will be the definite target of repression and just punishment from now on".

Iranian clerics and Grand Ayatollahs vehemently condemned the bombings and urged severe punishment for the perpetrators.

Iranian President Ebrahim Raisi cancelled a scheduled visit to Turkey and declared a national day of mourning for the victims of the attacks on 4 January. Interior minister Ahmad Vahidi vowed an imminent response for the responsible parties. In his visit to the scene, FARAJA head Brigadier General Ahmad-Reza Radan vowed to uproot terrorists. Mohammad Bagher Ghalibaf, the speaker of the Islamic Consultative Assembly urged authorities to identify those behind the attacks.

Soleimani's daughter Zeinab condemned the attacks and expressed hope that "the perpetrators of the crime will be identified and punished for their actions".

=== International ===
==== Countries ====
Russian president Vladimir Putin expressed condolences to the victims of the attacks, calling it "shocking in cruelty and cynicism". Turkish president Recep Tayyip Erdoğan expressed his condolences to the "friendly and brotherly" people of Iran via a social media post. Pope Francis issued a telegram expressing his deep sadness over the "loss of life". India said it is shocked and saddened over the "terrible" bombings in Iran's Kerman city, and expressed solidarity with the government and people.

Pakistan's foreign minister Jalil Abbas Jilani strongly condemned "inhuman terrorist attacks" and said "Pakistan stands in solidarity with Iran at this hour of grief". Syria, Saudi Arabia and the United Arab Emirates expressed condemnation of the attack. The foreign ministries of Afghanistan, Iraq, Armenia, Azerbaijan and India also expressed support for the Iranian people as well. North Korean leader Kim Jong-un expressed support to Iran and condemned the bombings.

==== Supranational organizations ====
The United Nations and the European Union also condemned the attack.

==== Non-state entities ====
The leader of Hezbollah, Hassan Nasrallah, said the victims of the bombings were "martyrs who died on the same road, cause and battle that was led by Soleimani". The Houthi movement in Yemen also condemned the attacks, calling the "criminal bombings" an "extension of all the crimes that attempted to undermine the Islamic Republic, its role in confronting global arrogance, its adoption of the nation's central cause, and its support for the resistance forces in Palestine and Lebanon."

== Responsibility ==
On 4 January, the Islamic State claimed responsibility for the attack in a statement posted on Telegram. It later released images on its news outlet Amaq showing two masked individuals who it claimed were brothers who carried out the attack as suicide bombers. Based on U.S. intelligence assessments, the attack was executed by the Afghanistan branch of the Islamic State, known as ISIS–K. The United States had warned Iran of an Islamic State attack prior to the bombings, with US officials stating that the information was timely enough and had enough details about the location to thwart or mitigate the bombings.

Prior to Islamic State's claim of responsibility, Iranian president Ebrahim Raisi blamed Israel for the attack. Vice President Mohammad Mokhber and Expediency Discernment Council member General Mohsen Rezaee also blamed Israel for the bombings. Quds Force commander Esmail Qaani claimed that the perpetrators were "supplied by the United States and the Zionist regime". The United States said there is no reason to believe Israel was involved in the bombing, and rejected suggestions of US involvement, calling such allegations "ridiculous", and expressed its sympathies towards the victims. Asked for comment regarding the bombings, Israel Defense Forces spokesperson Daniel Hagari said it was "focused on the combat with Hamas".

Despite the Islamic State's claims of responsibility for the attacks, Iranian officials continued to accuse the United States and Israel of involvement in the attacks, with IRGC commanding general Hossein Salami saying that the group "has disappeared" and that its members "only act as mercenaries" for American and Israeli interests on 5 January. Authorities later arrested two people on suspicion of providing support to the suspected suicide bombers and arrested a total of 35 people who were believed to have been involved in the attack.

One of the suicide bombers was identified as a citizen of Tajikistan. On 11 January, the Iranian Ministry of Intelligence said it had identified the mastermind of the attacks as a Tajikistani national known by his alias Abdollah Tajiki, who illegally entered Iran through its southeastern border in December 2023 and manufactured the bombs used in the attacks before leaving the country on 1 January. It also identified one of the bombers as a 24-year old Tajikistani national surnamed Bozrov, who was trained by Islamic State in Afghanistan before entering Iran through its southeastern border.

== Gallery ==
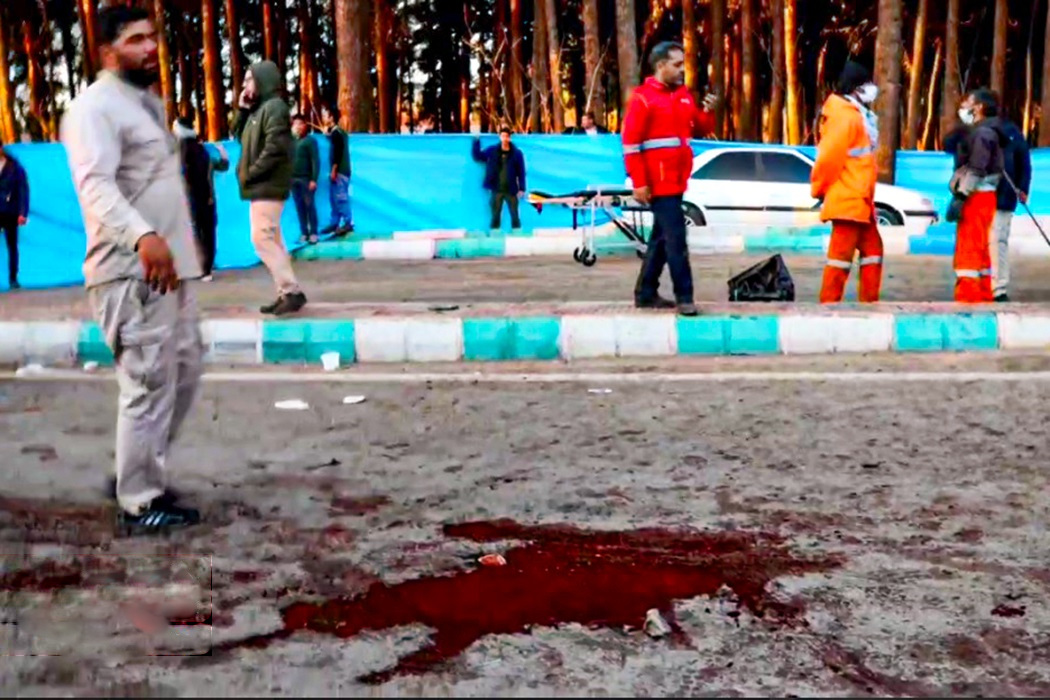

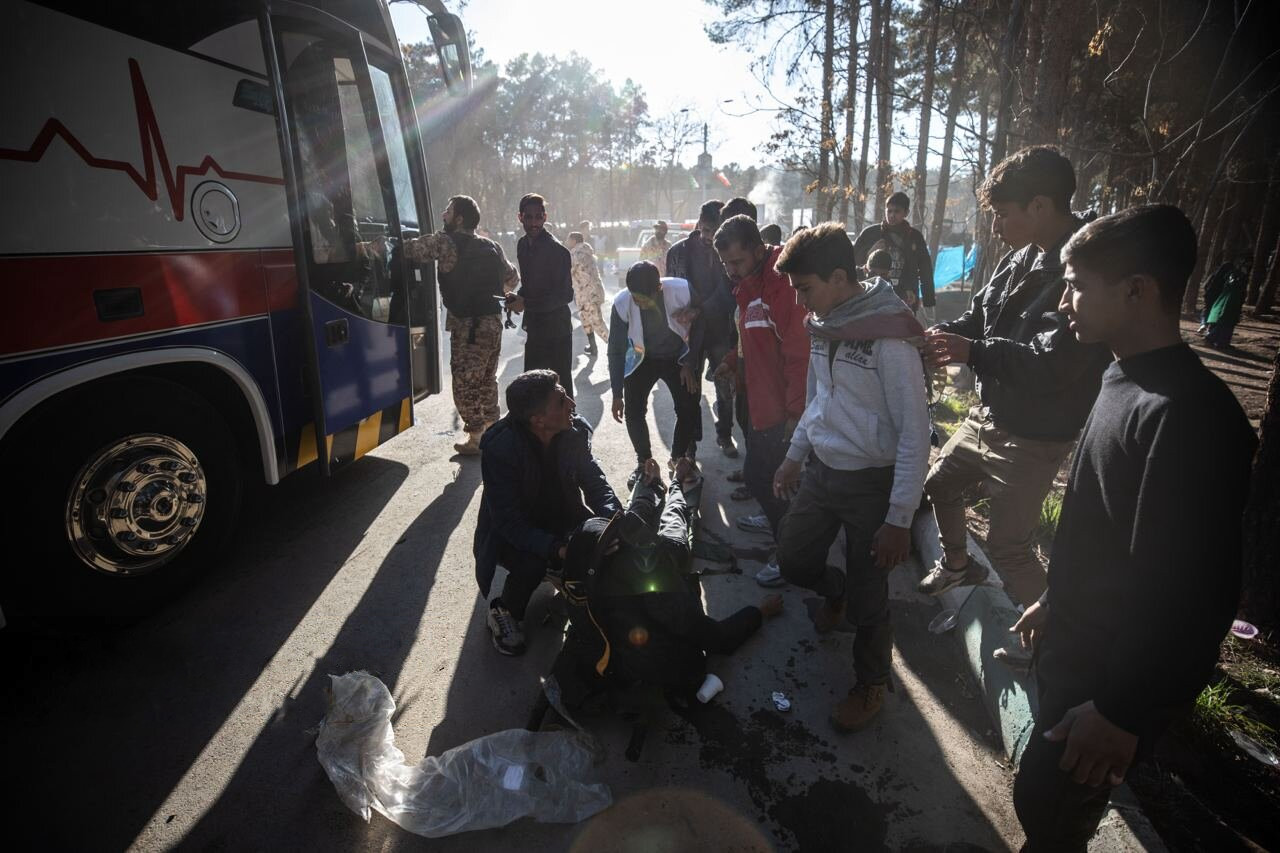

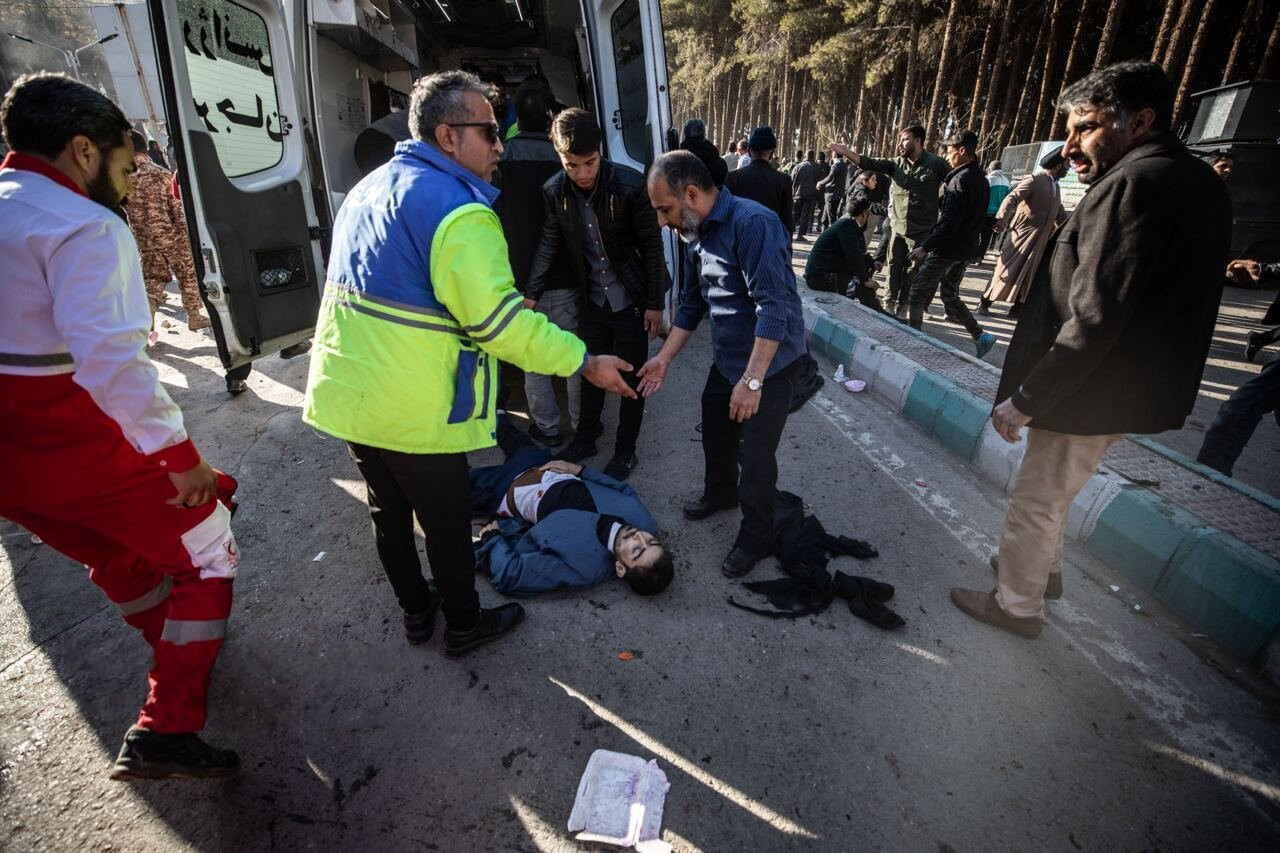

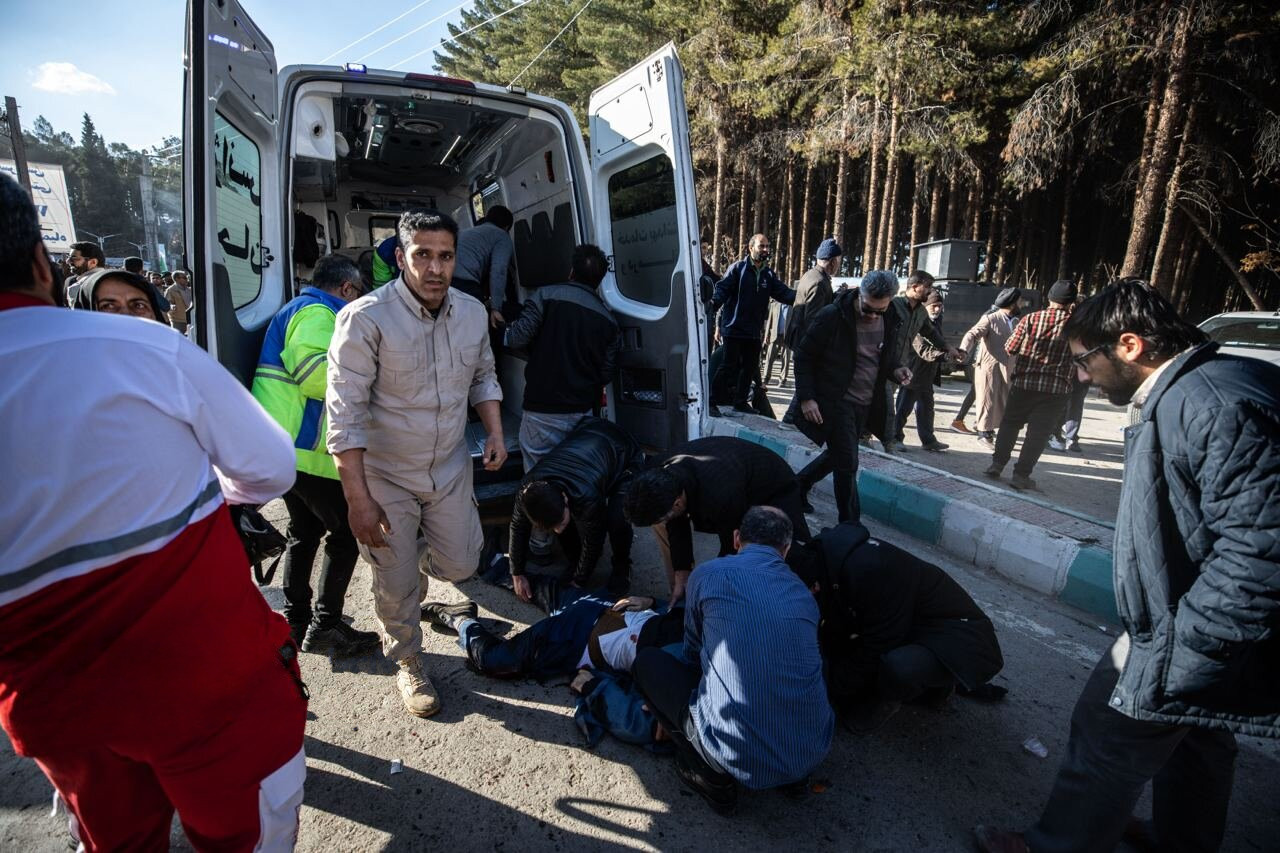

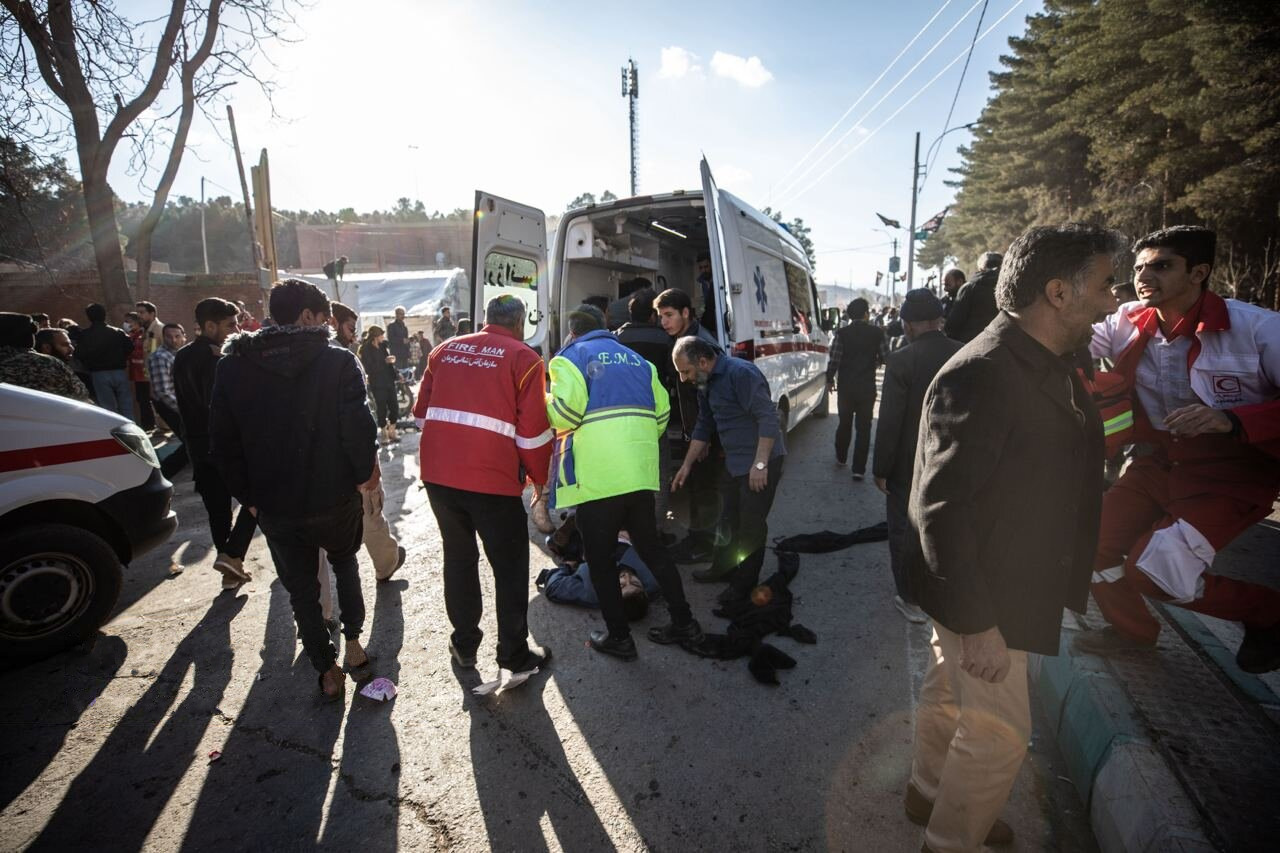

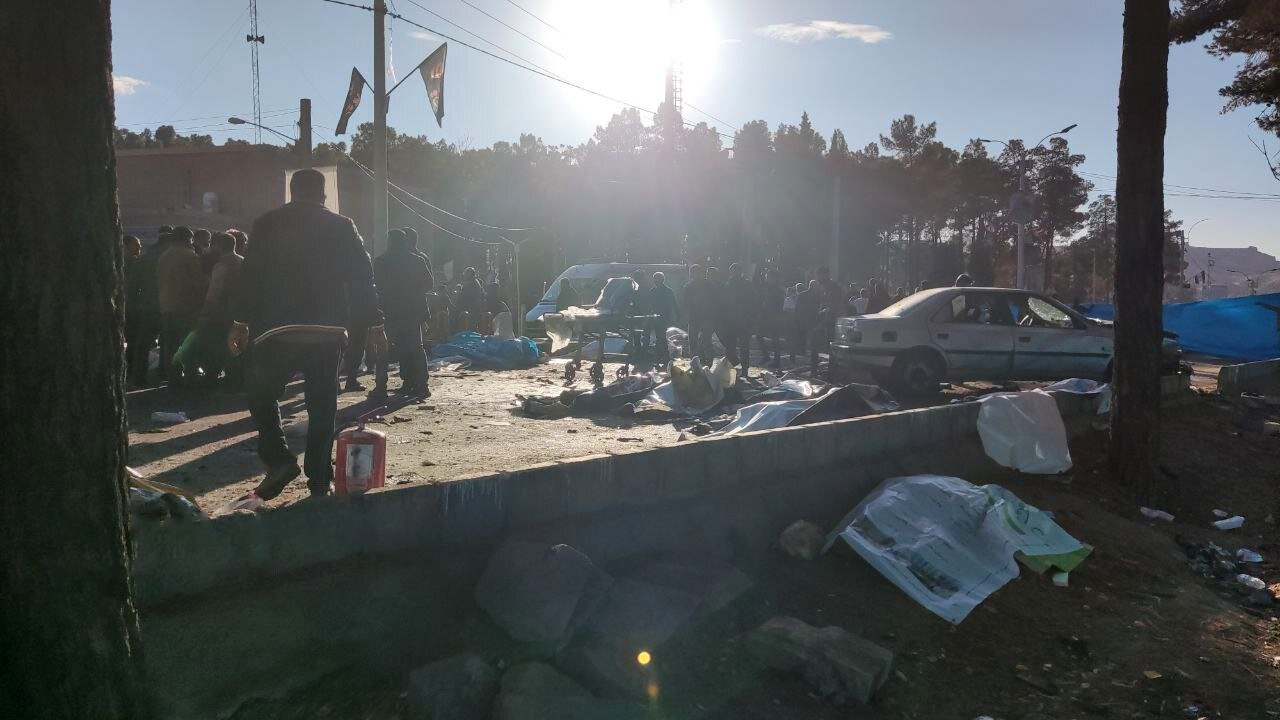

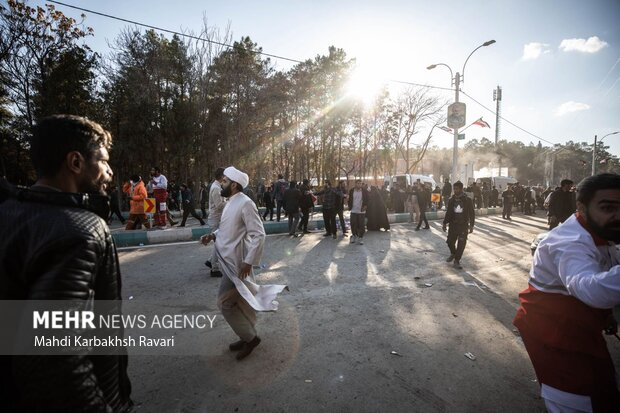

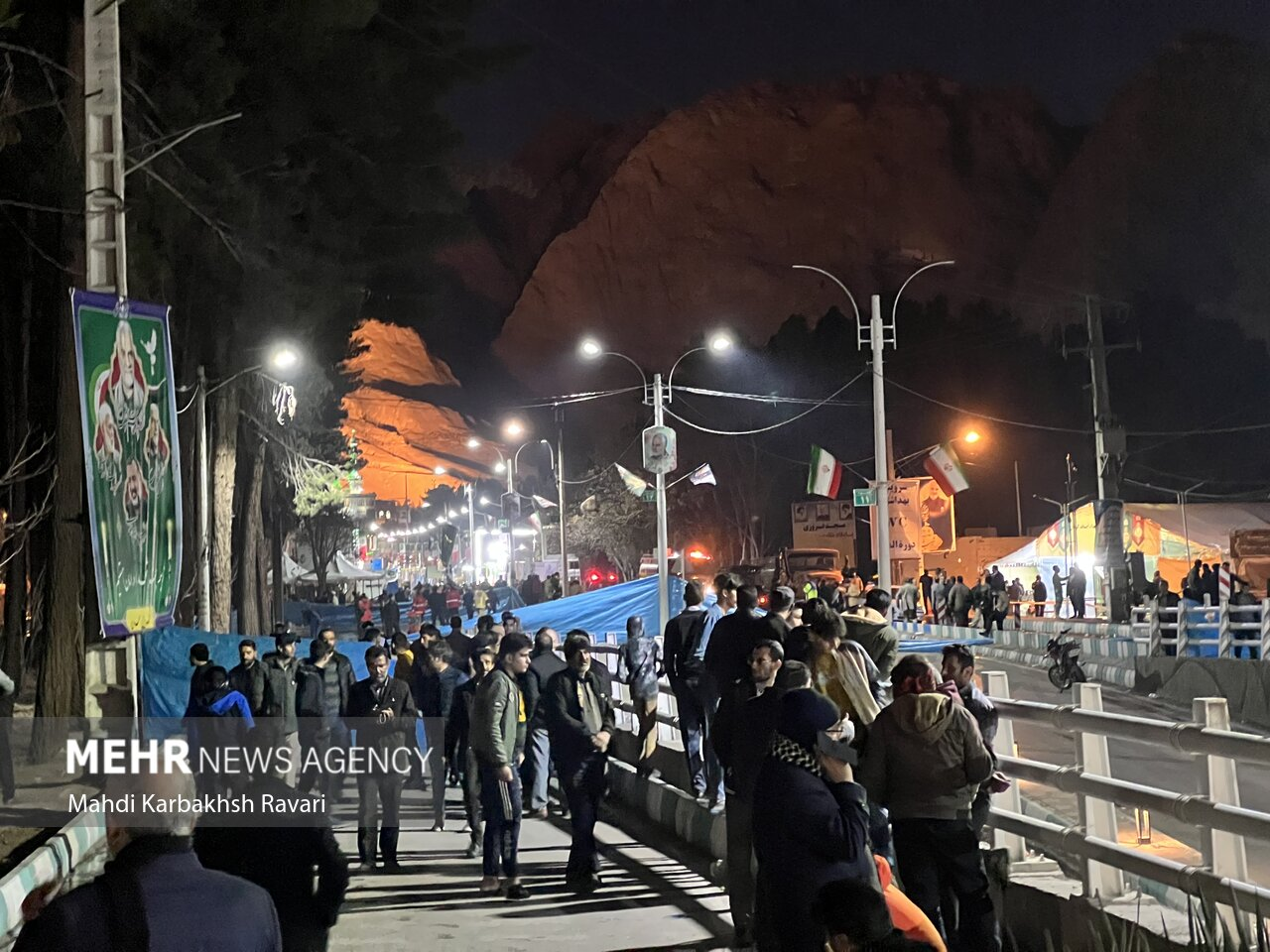

== See also ==
- Assassination and terrorism in Iran
- List of terrorist incidents in 2024
- List of terrorist incidents linked to Islamic State – Khorasan Province
- List of terrorist incidents linked to the Islamic State
- Haft-e Tir bombing, the deadliest bomb attack in Iran before Kerman
- Crocus City Hall attack, a terrorist attack in Russia orchestrated by ISIS-K later in 2024
