= Juzzak Airport =

- IATA: none; ICAO: OP35

Summary
- Airport type: Regional
- Owner: Civil Aviation Authority (CAA)
- Operator: Pakistan International Airlines (PIA)
- Location: Chagai district, Balochistan, Pakistan
- Coordinates: 29°02′27″N 061°38′51″E
- Interactive map of Juzzak Airport

Juzzak Airport is a regional airport located in the Chagai district of Balochistan, Pakistan. For Chinese engineers engaged in a variety of regional projects, particularly the Saindak Copper-Gold Project, it serves as a transit centre that enables chartered flights between Karachi and Juzzak.

== Development and History ==
After Juzzak Airport underwent the necessary infrastructure and facility renovations, the Civil Aviation Authority (CAA) renewed the airport's licence in August 2021. These upgrades have helped the airport work more efficiently to accommodate charter flights.

In October 2021, it was reported that the completion of the air traffic control facility was expected for March 2023, the passenger terminal building was anticipated for June 2023, while the airport's full construction was expected to be completed in October 2023.

Operating charter flights between Karachi and Juzzak Airport is now the responsibility of Pakistan International Airlines (PIA). Chinese engineers are transported by the airline to and from the Saindak Copper-Gold Project using ATR-42 turboprop planes.

In February 2024, the airport was used to transport the bodies of nine Pakistani labourers that were killed in a terrorist attack in Iran to their native towns in Punjab.
