= Intelligence outsourcing =

Action of outsourcing the duties of intelligence agencies

Outsourcing intelligence is a method by which a country contracts out intelligence activities such as collection, analysis, and dissemination to non-governmental employees. In the United States of America, approximately 70% of the intelligence budget was spent on contracts in 2006.

== Methods ==
The government of a country may outsource intelligence gathering that may not be obtainable through other means, where the only way may be through human intelligence such as the CIA's National Clandestine Service (NCS). It may mean outsourcing to foreign nationals from a country of interest, they may outsource to private companies as well to gather the specified intelligence needed. For a company the ways of outsourcing intelligence are the same, in which third party individuals and corporations are hired to obtain data and other intelligence. Intelligence can also be outsourced for analysis by a third party, in similar fashion to what the CIA's Directorate of Intelligence does.

== Jumping ship ==
Former analysts and officers of the Central Intelligence Agency and Department of National Intelligence are allowed to leave their government positions and go work for companies in the private sector the next day doing the same job. This is known as "butts in seats." The reason one former government analyst did go work for a private intelligence firm was because the pay in the private sector was about 50% higher than the one he had from the government.

== Private sector dominance ==
Following the terrorist attacks on September 11, 2001, the United States Congress increased the funding flow to the intelligence community. In November 2005, a CIA official accidentally revealed the intelligence budget to be $44 billion, which increased from a $26.6 billion budget reported by CIA Director George Tenet in 1997.

The intelligence community is allowed to keep its budget secret. With this secrecy comes speculation that at least 50% of the entire budget now flows to the private sector [Abbot]. It is also estimated that in the intelligence community much of the 15,000 analysts are drawing private-sector paychecks as a result of "butts in seats."

According to R.J. Hillhouse, "Defense Intelligence Agency (DIA) workers revealed at a conference in May that contractors make up 51% of the staff in the DIA." Hillhouse goes further to say that, "the CIA has a similar situation…between 50% and 60% of the workforce of the CIA's most important directorate, the National Clandestine Service (NCS)… is composed of employees of for-profit corporations." Hillhouse also says that, in terms of oversight the ratio is 1:25 (one government employee supervising twenty-five private contractors), which means that it will "involve multiple companies and multiple layers of administration."

Since the September 11 attacks, U.S. telecommunications giants AT&T and Verizon have actually outsourced all their controversial NSA-mandated internet and telephone surveillance to the contractors Narus and Verint respective, both of which have close ties to Israeli intelligence services, although they maintain headquarters in the U.S.

== Literature ==
- Shorrock, T., `Spies for Hire: The Secret World of Intelligence Outsourcing´, (Simon & Schuster: New York, London, Toronto, Sydney, May 2009, 2. Ed., ISBN 978-0-7432-8225-3)
- Van Puyvelde, D., `Outsourcing US Intelligence: Contractors and Government Accountability´, (Edinburgh University Press: Edinburgh, 2019, ISBN 978-1-4744-5022-5)
