= Iran–Pakistan border barrier =

- Iran–Pakistan border

Site information
- Type: Border barrier
- Controlled by: Iran and Pakistan

Site history
- Built: 2022–present

The Iran–Pakistan border barrier is a border barrier being built jointly by both countries along their 959-kilometer (596-mile) shared border. The primary goal is to prevent unauthorized border crossings and minimize the trafficking of illegal goods.

== Background ==
The Iran-Pakistan border, which separates Iran and Pakistan, demarcates the Iranian province of Sistan and Balochistan from the Pakistani province of Balochistan. The border is 909 kilometers (565 miles) in length.

The Iran-Pakistan Barrier, presently being constructed consists of a three-foot thick concrete wall (approximately 0.91 meters) that stands ten feet high (around 3.05 meters). This imposing structure spans 700 kilometers, navigating challenging desert terrain. The objectives of the barrier are to deter unlawful border crossings and curtail the influx of illegal drugs.

== History and stated purpose ==
The wall is being constructed to stop illegal border crossings and stem the flow of drugs, and is also a response to terror attacks, notably the one in the Iranian border town of Zahedan on February 17, 2007, which killed 13 people, including nine Iranian Revolutionary Guard officials. However Pakistani Foreign Ministry spokeswoman Tasnim Aslam denied any link between the fence and the bomb blast, saying that Iran was not blaming these incidents on Pakistan.

== Fencing ==
=== Iranian fencing project (2011) ===
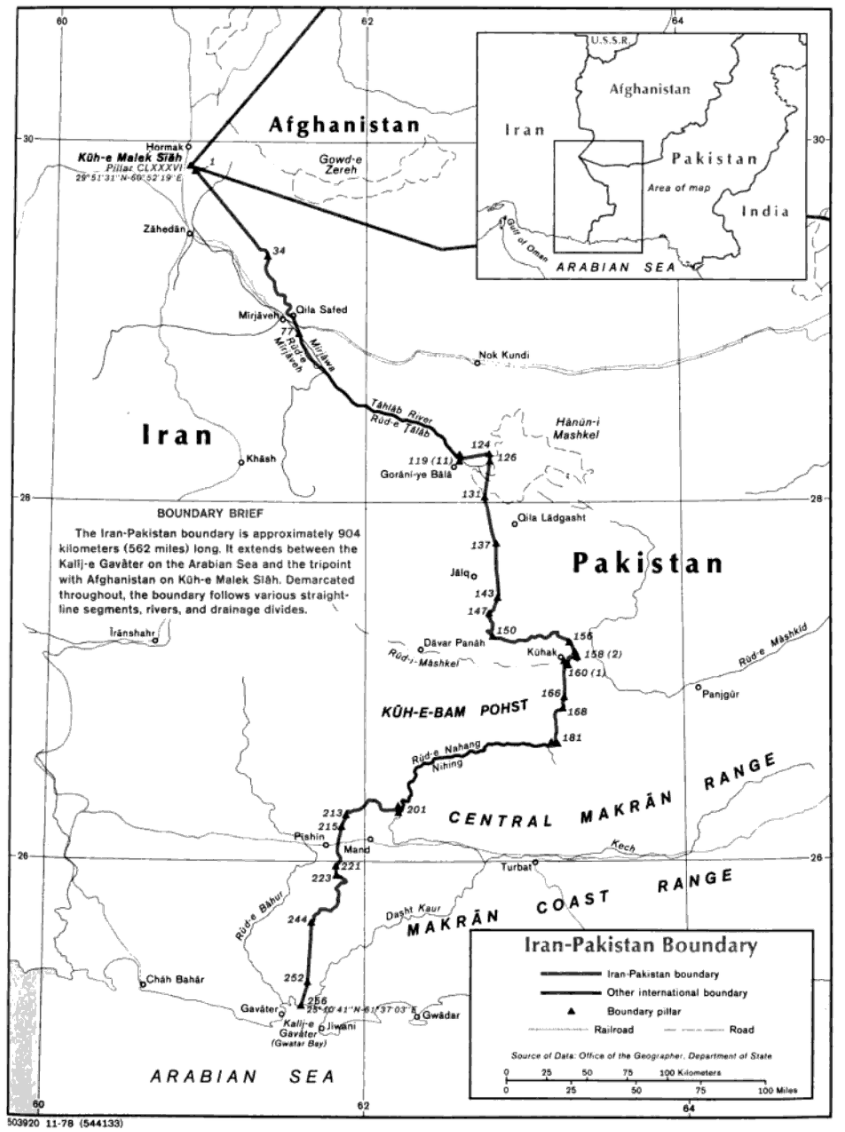
Brief map of the Iran–Pakistan border

The 3 ft (91.4 cm) thick and 10 ft (3.05 m) high concrete wall, fortified with steel rods, will span the 700 km frontier stretching from Taftan to Mand. The project will include large earth and stone embankments and deep ditches to deter illegal trade crossings and drug smuggling to both side. The border region is already dotted with police observation towers and fortress-style garrisons for troops. Iran and Pakistan do not have border disputes or other irredentist claims and Pakistan's Foreign Ministry has stated, "Pakistan has no reservation because Iran is constructing the fence on its territory".

=== Pakistani fencing project (2019) ===
In 2019, Pakistan announced its intention to fence its border with Iran.

In May 2019, Pakistan approved $18.6 Million funds to fence border with Iran.

In September 2021, Pakistan approved $58.5 Million additional funds for border fencing.

As of mid-2021, Pakistan has fenced 46% of border and is expected to be fully fenced by December 2021.

As of January 2022, Pakistan has fenced 80% of border. Interior Ministry stated that remaining border will also be fenced.

== Construction ==
The barrier is currently under construction in challenging mountainous areas in southeastern Iran, known for their tough-to-cross terrain. It includes a robust concrete wall measuring three feet in thickness and ten feet in height, extending over 700 kilometers through inhospitable desert regions.

As of March 2022, a stretch of 659 kilometers out of the total 830-kilometer border has already been fenced. The remaining 171 kilometers are scheduled to be completed by December 2023.

== Impact on local economies ==
Despite the presence of barricades and the sophisticated Taftan portal, a significant amount of illegal goods managed to pass through. In 2021 the desolate and underdeveloped characteristics of the area created challenges in enforcing the law. This situation has sparked frustration among cross-border families. Due to restricted crossings, numerous pickup trucks, locally referred to as "zambad," have been stranded at the Pakistan-Iran border for the past month, enduring uncomfortable heat and hunger.

Moreover, Iran and Pakistan have decided to construct six joint-border markets to boost trade. In the first phase, three markets will be opened in the border points of Kuhak-Chadgi, Rimdan-Gabd and Pishin-Mand areas. In the second phase, border markets will be set up at three other border points. The first three border markets out of six have already been constructed and operationalized at Gabd, Mand and Chadgi.

== Diplomatic relations ==
Iran and Pakistan have established a collaborative working group to oversee border management, encompassing security, trade, and travel matters between both nations. In January 2023, the two parties signed 39 Memorandums of Understanding (MOUs). These agreements have the potential to significantly boost trade, potentially reaching an estimated trade value of around $5 billion per year.

=== Reactions to the barrier ===
The Foreign Ministry of Pakistan has said that Iran has the right to erect border fencing in its territory. However, opposition to the construction of the wall was raised in the Provincial Assembly of Balochistan. It maintained that the wall would create problems for the Baloch people whose lands straddle the border region. The community would become further divided politically and socially, with their trade and social activities being seriously impeded. Leader of the Opposition Kachkol Ali said the governments of the two countries had not taken the Baloch into their confidence on this matter, demanded that the construction of the wall be stopped immediately, and appealed to the international community to help the Baloch people.

== See also ==
- Iran-Pakistan border skirmishes
