= Taltita =

Taltita تلتيتا
- Village
- Location in Syria
- Coordinates: 36.112°N 36.553°E
- Country: Syria
- Governorate: Idlib
- District: Harem District
- Subdistrict: Kafr Takharim Nahiyah

Population (2004)
  - Total: 487
- Time zone: UTC+2 (EET)
  - Summer (DST): UTC+3 (EEST)
- City Qrya Pcode: C4154

Taltita (Arabic: تلتيتا) is a Syrian village located in Kafr Takharim Nahiyah in Harem District, Idlib. According to the Syria Central Bureau of Statistics (CBS), Taltita had a population of 487 in the 2004 census. It is a Druze village of the Jabal al-Sumaq region.
