= Twelve-Day War =

2025 war in West Asia

- Part of the Iran–Israel conflict and Middle Eastern crisis
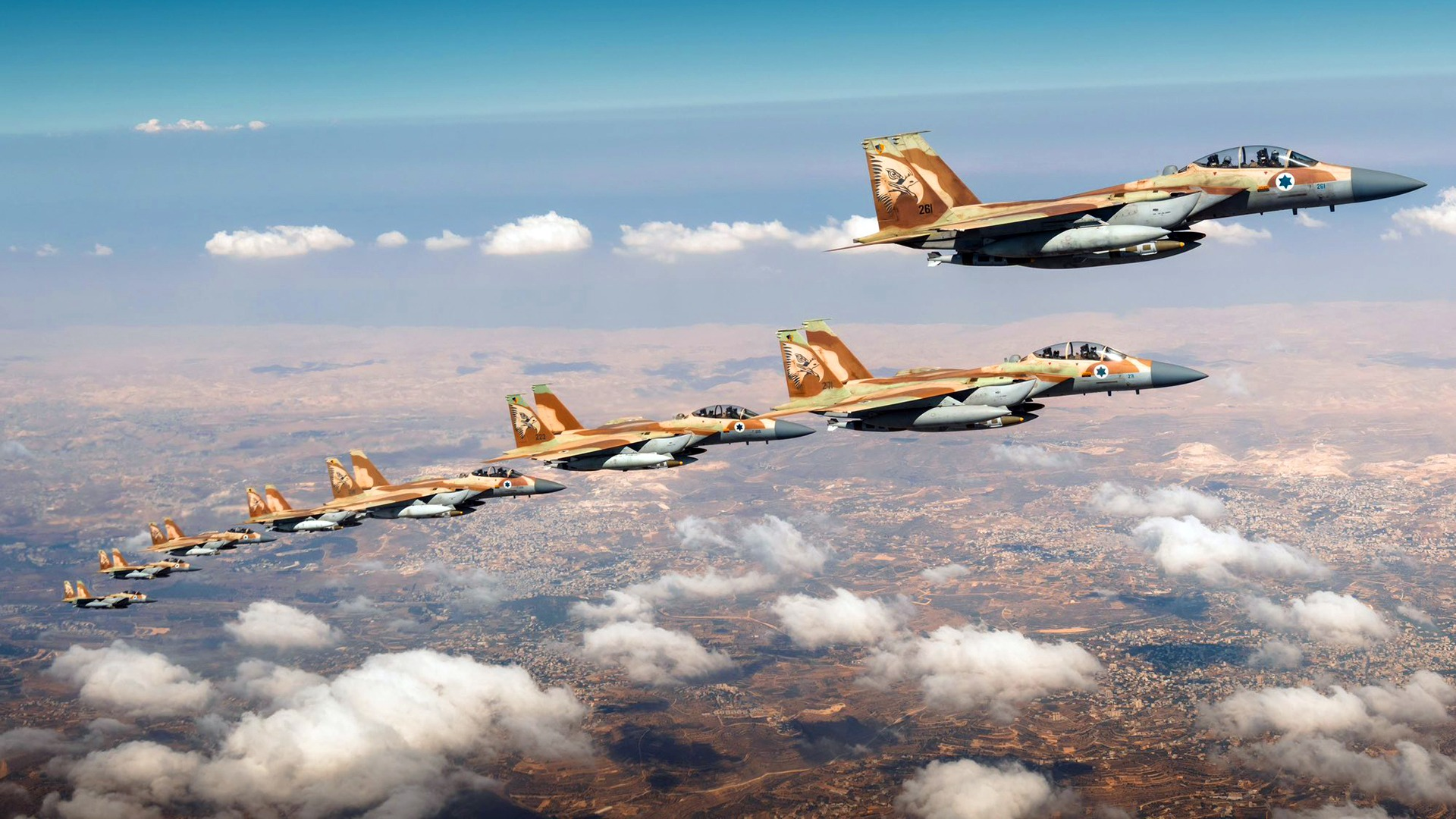
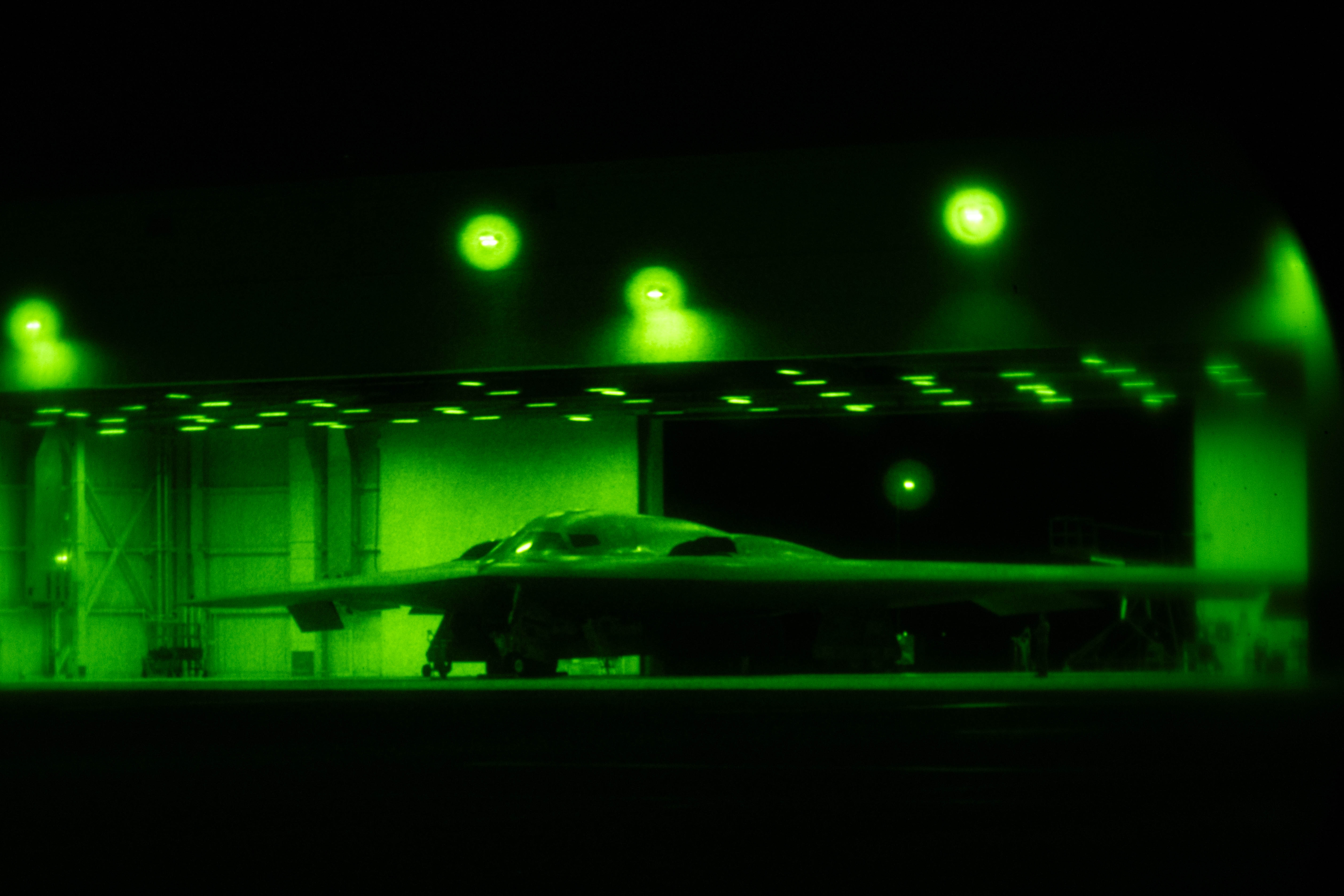
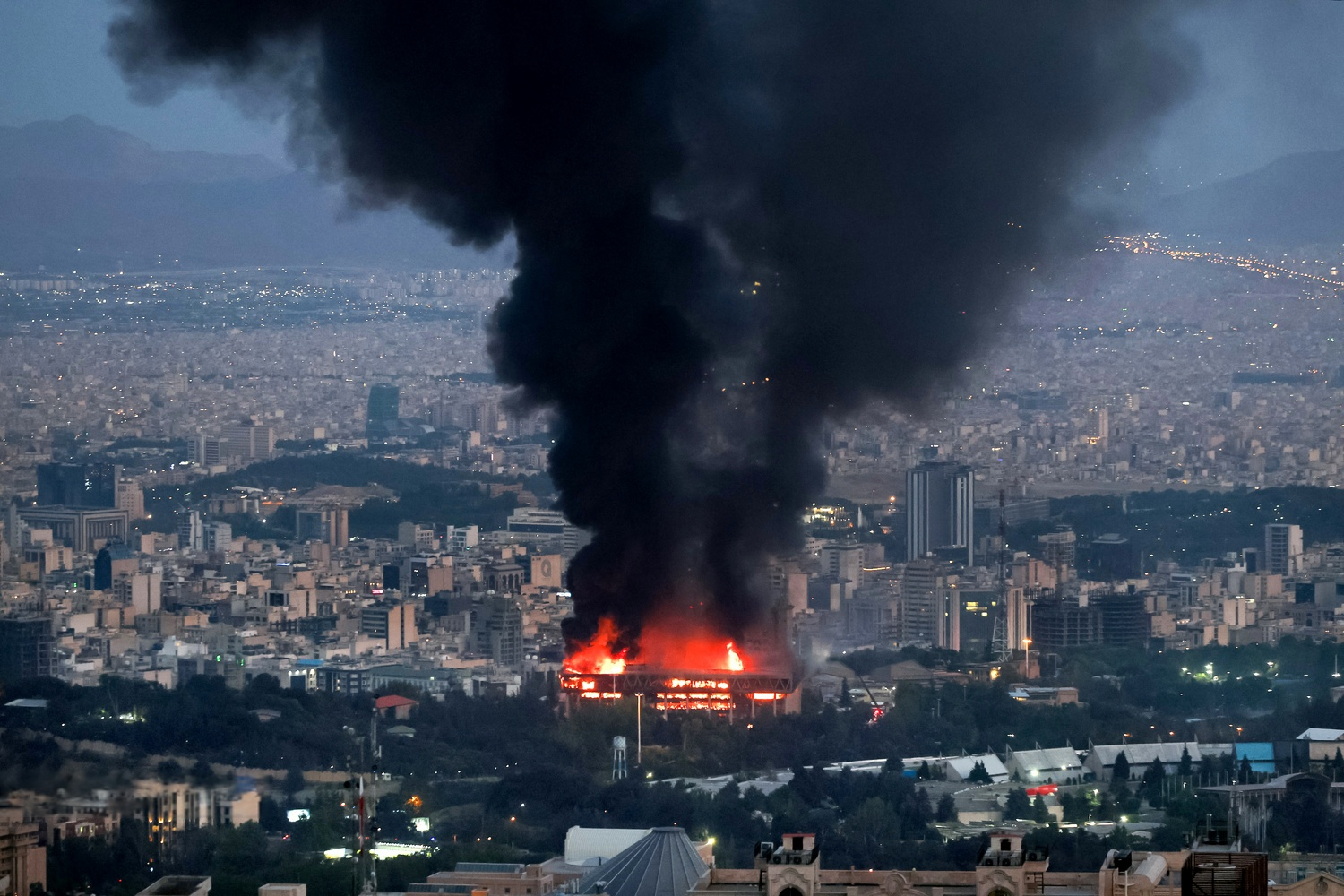
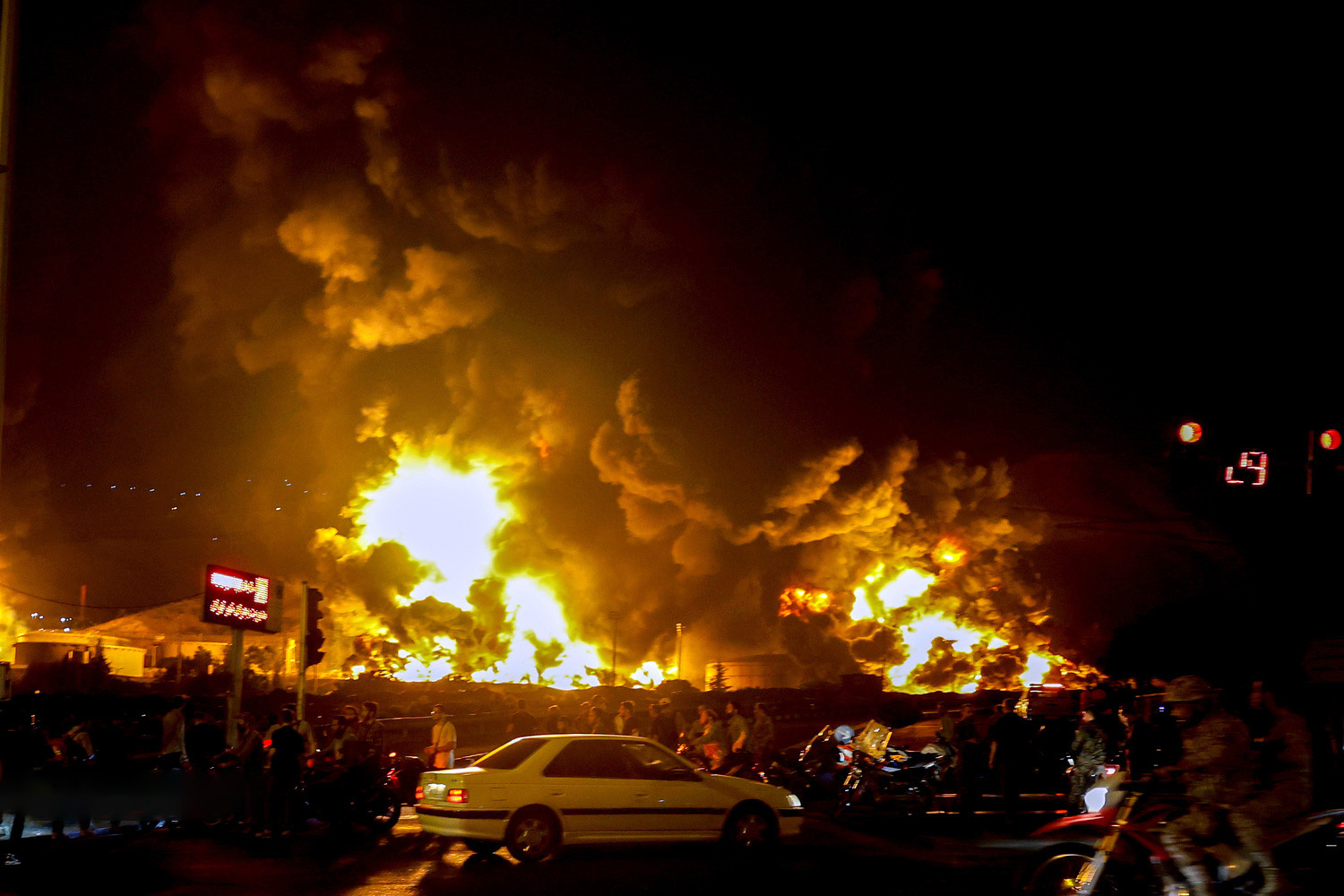
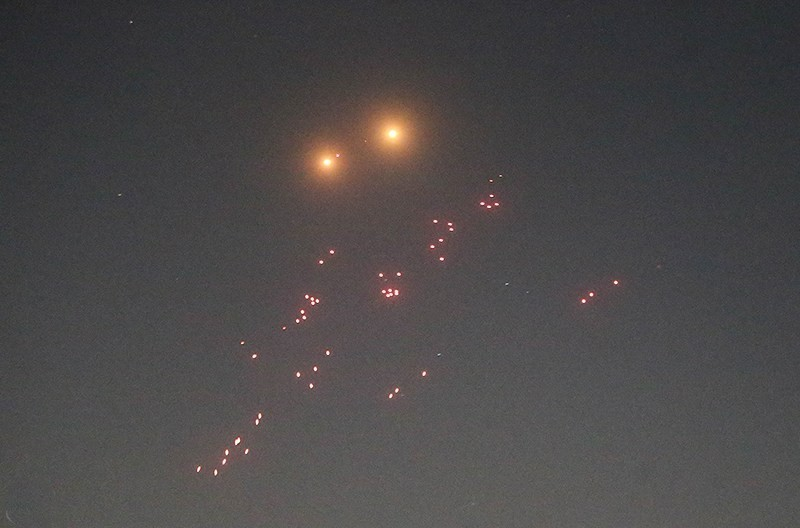
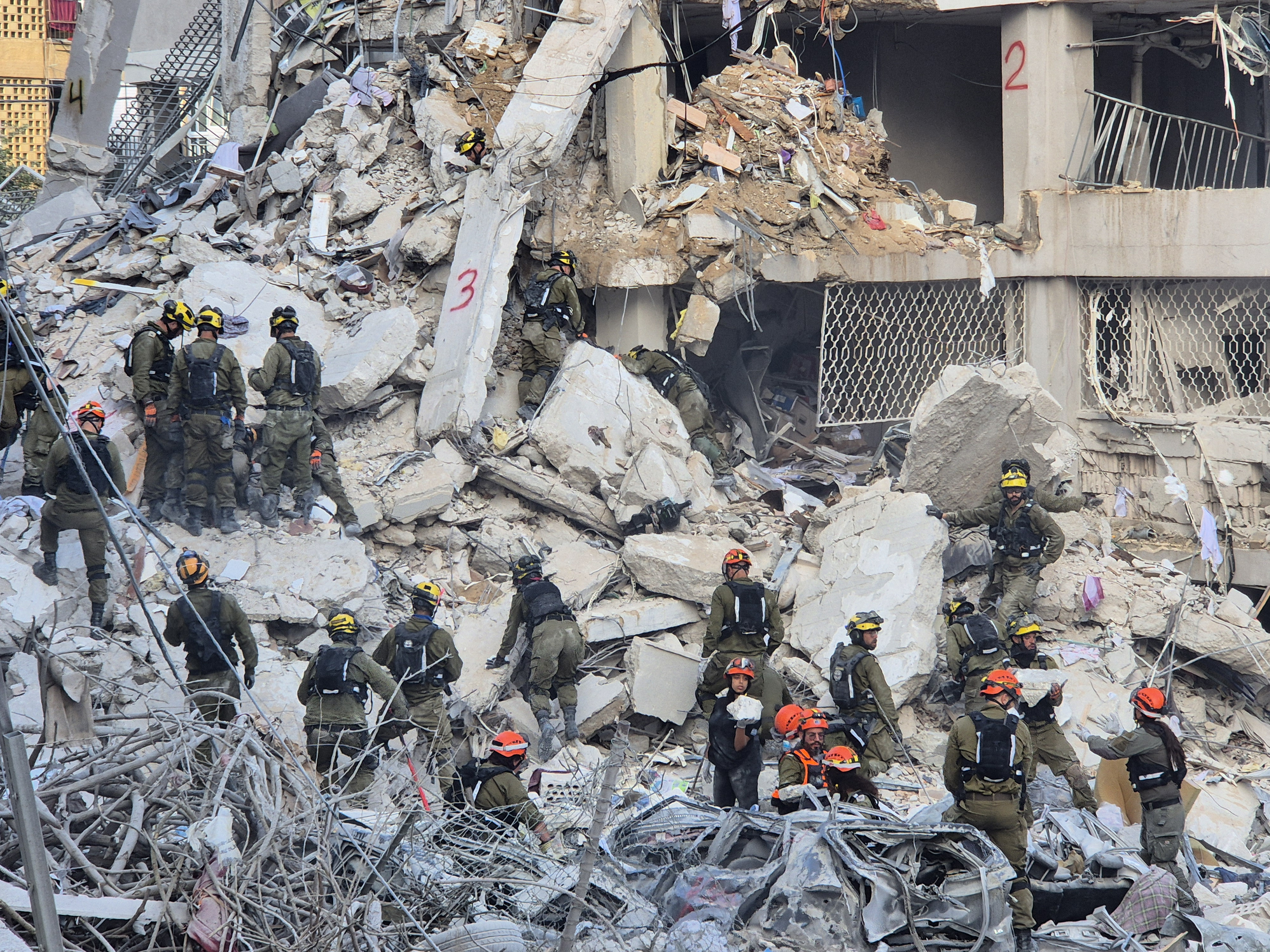
- From top to bottom, left to right: Israeli jets on their way to attack Iran; U.S. Air Force B-2 Spirit being prepared for American strikes on Iran; Israeli strike on the IRIB studio; Explosions in Tehran during the war; Iranian target interceptions over Tehran; Debris in Bat Yam following an Iranian strike
| Date | 13–24 June 2025 (12 days) |
| Location | Iran, Israel and the West Bank (Note: Spillover countries include Iraq, Jordan, Kuwait, Qatar, Lebanon, Saudi Arabia, Syria, and Yemen.) |
| Result | Inconclusive; Ceasefire |

Belligerents
| Israel; United States (Note: Indirectly involved during the first nine days of the war, and became directly involved on the tenth day when it struck Iranian nuclear sites on 22 June (02:10–02:35 IRST).) Defensive only: France Iraq Jordan Saudi Arabia Qatar | Iran; Houthis (Note: The Houthis joined Iran in launching rockets on Israel in retaliation for the 13 June strikes.) |

Commanders and leaders
| Benjamin Netanyahu; Israel Katz; Eyal Zamir; Tomer Bar; Donald Trump; Pete Hegseth; Dan Caine; Michael Kurilla; George Wikoff | Ali Khamenei; Masoud Pezeshkian (WIA); Abdolrahim Mousavi; Mohammad Bagheri X; Gholam Ali Rashid X; Hossein Salami X; Amir Ali Hajizadeh X; Abdul-Malik al-Houthi; Muhammad al-Ghamari (WIA) |

Units involved
- See order of battle

Casualties and losses
| Per Israel: 32 civilians and 1 off-duty soldier killed (Note: Attributed to multiple sources:) (Note: One Israeli woman died of a heart attack while sheltering from Iranian missiles.); 3,238 wounded 2 Hermes drones shot down Per Iran: 61+ UAVs and cruise missiles destroyed 10,000+ drones seized 700+ Mossad agents arrested 5 Mossad agents executed (Note: Attributed to multiple sources:) | Per Iran: 1,060 killed 5,800 wounded Per HRANA: 1,190 killed (436 civilians, 435 military personnel, and 319 unidentified); 4,475 injured Per Israel: 950 drones destroyed before being launched 200+ ballistic missile launchers and 120+ surface-to-air missile launchers destroyed 8 AH-1J helicopters destroyed 5 F-14A fighter jets destroyed 2 F-5E fighter jets destroyed 1 KC-707 refueling aircraft destroyed |
- Reports vary widely, see Casualties for details. Tens of thousands of Iranian civilians displaced 9,000+ Israeli civilians displaced 8,000+ Israeli civilians homeless 1 Syrian civilian killed, 1 injured 7 Jordanian civilians injured 5 Palestinian civilians injured

The Twelve-Day War, also referred to as the Second Imposed War by Iran, was an armed conflict between Iran and Israel which lasted from 13 to 24 June 2025. It began when Israel bombed military and nuclear facilities in Iran in a surprise attack, assassinating prominent military leaders, nuclear scientists, and politicians, killing civilians, and damaging or destroying air defenses. Iran retaliated with over 550 ballistic missiles and over 1,000 suicide drones, hitting civilian population centers, one hospital and at least twelve military, energy, and government sites. The United States intercepted Iranian attacks and bombed three Iranian nuclear sites on 22 June. Iran retaliated by firing missiles at a US base in Qatar. On 24 June, Israel and Iran agreed to a ceasefire under US pressure.

The war followed a decades-long proxy conflict in which Iran supported an Axis of Resistance against Israeli and US interests in the region. Iran's development of nuclear enrichment capabilities has been an international controversy for decades, with Israel and its allies seeking to prevent Iranian nuclear weapons development. In 2015, under the Joint Comprehensive Plan of Action (JCPOA), six countries (Note: The UN Security Council's five permanent members (the P5); namely China, France, Russia, the United Kingdom, and the United States; plus Germany, as well as the European Union.) lifted sanctions on Iran, which froze its nuclear program. In 2018, US president Donald Trump unilaterally withdrew from the plan. Iran began stockpiling enriched uranium (Note: According to CNN, as of 2025 Iran has stockpiled 7730 kg of low enriched uranium, 275 kg of 20% highly enriched uranium, and 409 kg of 60% highly enriched uranium. Uranium is considered weapons-grade at 90% enrichment.) and largely suspended International Atomic Energy Agency (IAEA) monitoring. Following the October 7 attacks in 2023, both Hamas and Hezbollah entered into open conflict with Israel. In April 2024, Israel bombed Iran's consulate in Damascus, Syria, killing senior Iranian military officials. Direct conflict continued in April and October of 2024. (Note: Attributed to multiple sources:) The day before Israel started the Twelve-Day War in June 2025, the IAEA declared (Note: The resolution was passed with 19 votes in favour, 3 against (Russia, China and Burkina Faso) and 11 abstentions.) Iran non-compliant with its nuclear obligations in a resolution put forward by the United States, United Kingdom, France, and Germany.

Israel's attacks, which reportedly involved commando units and Mossad operatives in Iran, killed several of Iran's military leaders, leaders of the Islamic Revolutionary Guard Corps (IRGC), and at least 10 leading nuclear scientists. The war saw internet blackouts by the Iranian government. Israeli and US airstrikes damaged the nuclear facilities at Natanz, Isfahan, and Fordow, damaging them extensively. Iran suspended cooperation with the IAEA, which it said had passed information about nuclear facilities and scientists to Israel. Iran's total death toll has been estimated at between 1,060 and 1,190; thousands were wounded, tens of thousands were displaced, and the government ordered internet blackouts. Israel struck high-rise buildings, including apartments. Iranian missiles struck military and government sites, apartments, a research center, and a hospital.

The United Nations and most countries expressed deep concern over Israel's strikes and called for a diplomatic solution. (Note: Attributed to multiple sources:) The strikes were condemned by many countries, including most Muslim-majority and Arab states. The International Commission of Jurists and some other legal scholars saw the Israeli strikes as a violation of international law. Meanwhile, Argentina, Germany, Ukraine, and the United States said the strikes on Iran were justified to prevent nuclear proliferation and said Iran should agree to a nuclear deal promptly. Nine months later, on 28 February 2026, Israel and the United States launched strikes on Iran, beginning the 2026 Iran war.

== Name ==
Donald Trump first labeled the conflict as the "12 day war" in his announcement of a ceasefire agreement between Israel and Iran on 23 June 2025. AP News speculated the title was a reference to the 1967 Six-Day War, fought between Israel and a coalition of Arab states. A few days afterwards, American academic Howard Stoffer also compared the two wars to each other, and Reuters began using "12-day war" as a descriptive title; however, some experts initially doubted that Trump's coining would catch on. Ultimately, the standardized name "Twelve-Day War" or "Twelve Day War" entered into common usage by late 2025. In Iran, however, the conflict is labeled as the "Second Imposed War".

== Background ==
=== Iran–Israel conflict ===
Israel maintained a close relationship with the Pahlavi monarchy until the Iranian Revolution, when the monarchy was ousted and replaced by an anti-Western theocratic Islamic republic led by Ruhollah Khomeini. Ever since, Iran's government has repeatedly pledged to destroy Israel. Israel considers the Iranian nuclear program an existential threat, fearing that Iran will develop a nuclear weapon.

In 2024, Israel and Iran attacked each other openly and directly for the first time following decades of proxy war. In April 2024, an Israeli airstrike on the Iranian consulate in Damascus killed Iranian officers. Iran retaliated with strikes on Israel in April 2024, to which Israel then retaliated with strikes on Iran. In July 2024, Israel assassinated Hamas leader Ismail Haniyeh in Iran's capital Tehran, and then assassinated Hezbollah leader Hassan Nasrallah and prominent IRGC commander Abbas Nilforoushan in Lebanon in September 2024. In October 2024, Iran struck Israel, and Israel struck Iran. The latter Israeli strikes destroyed nearly all of Iran's Russian-supplied defensive S-300 missile systems, paving the way for potential future Israeli strikes.

=== Iranian nuclear program ===
Israeli prime minister Benjamin Netanyahu cited Iran's nuclear program as the reason Israel preemptively struck Iran. The country developed a covert nuclear weapons program named the AMAD Project in the 1980s and 1990s, which, according to US intelligence assessments, was suspended in 2003.

Iran had consistently said that its nuclear program is solely for peaceful purposes and that it has never intended to develop nuclear weapons. However, since 2019, it had repeatedly violated the terms of the previous nuclear deal of 2015, and in June 2025 the IAEA reported that Iran had acquired enough enriched uranium to produce nine nuclear warheads.

In 2015, six countries negotiated with Iran the Joint Comprehensive Plan of Action nuclear deal to lift sanctions on Iran and freeze Iran's nuclear program. In 2018, after being briefed on evidence that Iran sought to resume its nuclear weapons development, U.S. president Donald Trump unilaterally withdrew from and voided the deal – despite the report by the International Atomic Energy Agency (IAEA) that Iran was keeping to the deal. After the withdrawal Iran began stockpiling enriched uranium, and the IAEA lost the ability to monitor Iran's nuclear facilities.

In a letter addressed to the president of the UN Security Council, the foreign ministers of France, Britain and Germany (E3) stated that since 2019, Iran had "increasingly and deliberately ceased performing its JCPOA commitments", including "the accumulation of a highly enriched uranium stockpile which lacks any credible civilian justification and is unprecedented for a state without a nuclear weapons program," a statement confirmed by the IAEA. The letter detailed additional Iranian violations of the agreement despite the fact that the E3 "have consistently upheld their agreements under the terms of the JCPOA".

In March 2025, US Director of National Intelligence, Tulsi Gabbard, testified that the US intelligence community assessed that "Iran is not building a nuclear weapon". A month later, Trump announced negotiations between the United States and Iran regarding Iran's nuclear program. The White House declared that Iran had two months to secure a deal, which expired the day before Israel's strikes. On 31 May 2025, the IAEA issued a report in which it stated that Iran had enough uranium enriched up to 60% for the production of nine nuclear weapons, and enough for additional weapons at lower enrichment levels.

On 12 June 2025, the IAEA board of governors passed a resolution, drafted by the US, UK, France and Germany, that declared that Iran was non-compliant with its nuclear obligations for the first time since September 2005. IAEA director general Rafael Grossi stated in an interview that the IAEA did "not have any proof of a systematic effort to move into a nuclear weapon", on the other hand, in his statement to the board of governors on 9 June he stated that "Unless and until Iran assists the agency in resolving the outstanding safeguards issues, the Agency will not be in a position to provide assurance that Iran's nuclear programme is exclusively peaceful".

=== Axis of Resistance ===
Israel has fought wars with Iranian proxies including against Hezbollah since the 1982 Lebanon War. In the October 7 attacks in 2023, Hamas, an Iranian proxy in Gaza, started the Gaza war, following which Israel severely weakened both Hamas and fellow Iranian proxy Hezbollah in Lebanon, while also attacking the Houthis in Yemen. This is said to have weakened Iranian deterrence and increased Iranian isolation.

=== Gaza war ===
Israel's strikes on Iran came against the backdrop of its ongoing war with Iran-aligned Hamas in Gaza and a broader escalation of its military actions across the region, including Israeli military activity in Lebanon, Yemen, Syria, and the occupied West Bank. They also came in the context of a risk of famine and humanitarian crisis in the Israeli blockaded Gaza Strip that a growing number of scholars and human rights organizations have described as a genocide. In the weeks leading up to Israeli attacks, the Israeli government faced international pressure over the high risk of famine in Gaza and killing of civilians. Even Israel's allies in Europe had become critical of the starvation in Gaza, and the EU had announced it would reconsider its free-trade deal with Israel. Political scientists stated that the attack on Iran provided a distraction from Israel's actions in Gaza. Nesrine Malik said the attack was an attempt by Israel to bring a Europe alienated by Israel's action in the suffering in Gaza back to its side.

=== Announcement ===
Israeli Prime Minister Benjamin Netanyahu announced Operation Rising Lion, targeting Iran's main enrichment facility in Natanz, its nuclear scientists, and parts of its ballistic missile program. He described Iran's nuclear efforts as "a clear and present danger to Israel's very survival", and said the operation would continue "for as many days as it takes".

In a speech announcing the attack, Netanyahu stated that for decades, Iran's leaders had openly called for Israel's destruction and warned that Iran could produce a nuclear weapon "in a very short time. It could be a year. It could be within a few months, less than a year."

== Timeline ==
=== 13 June ===
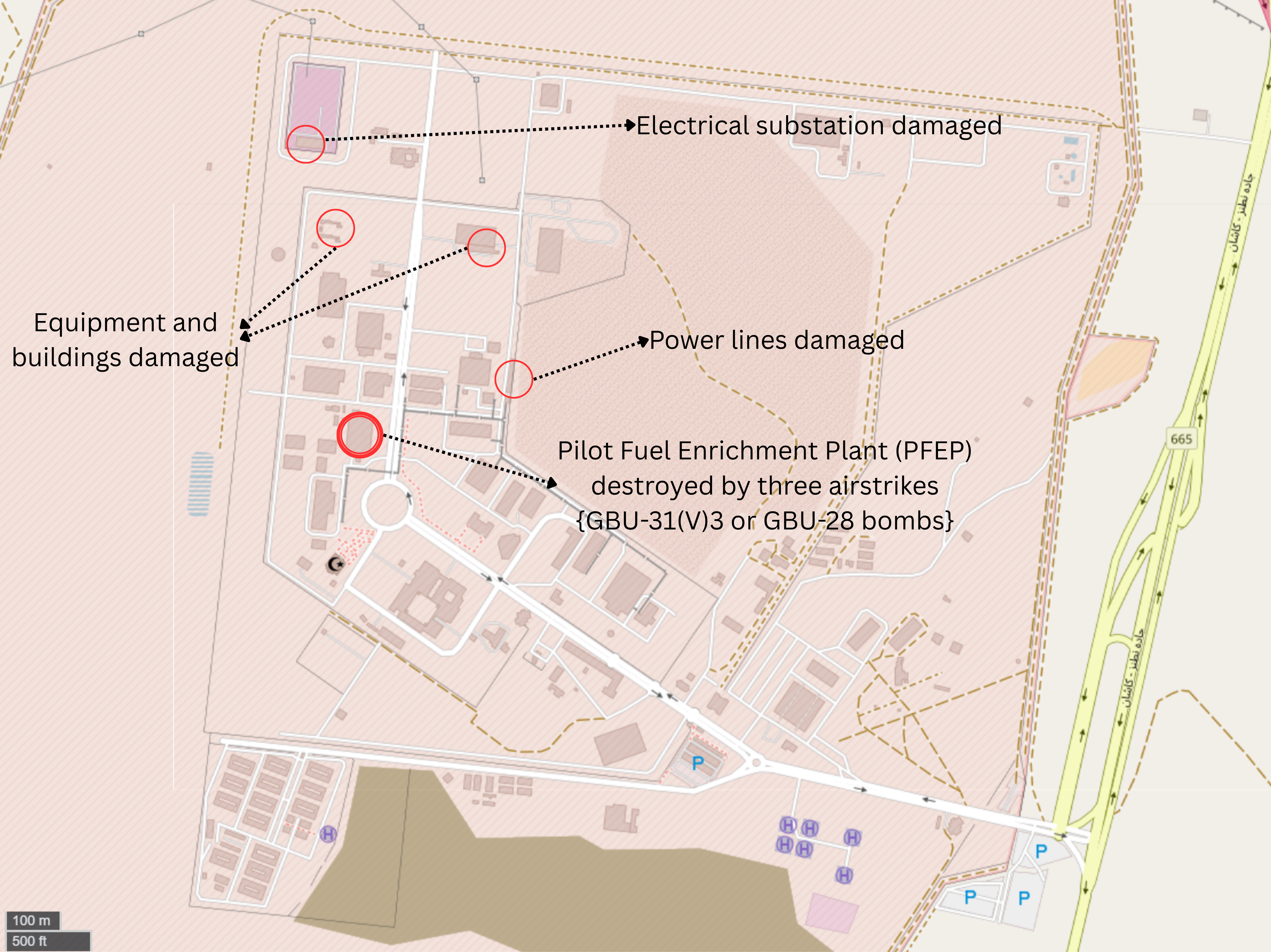
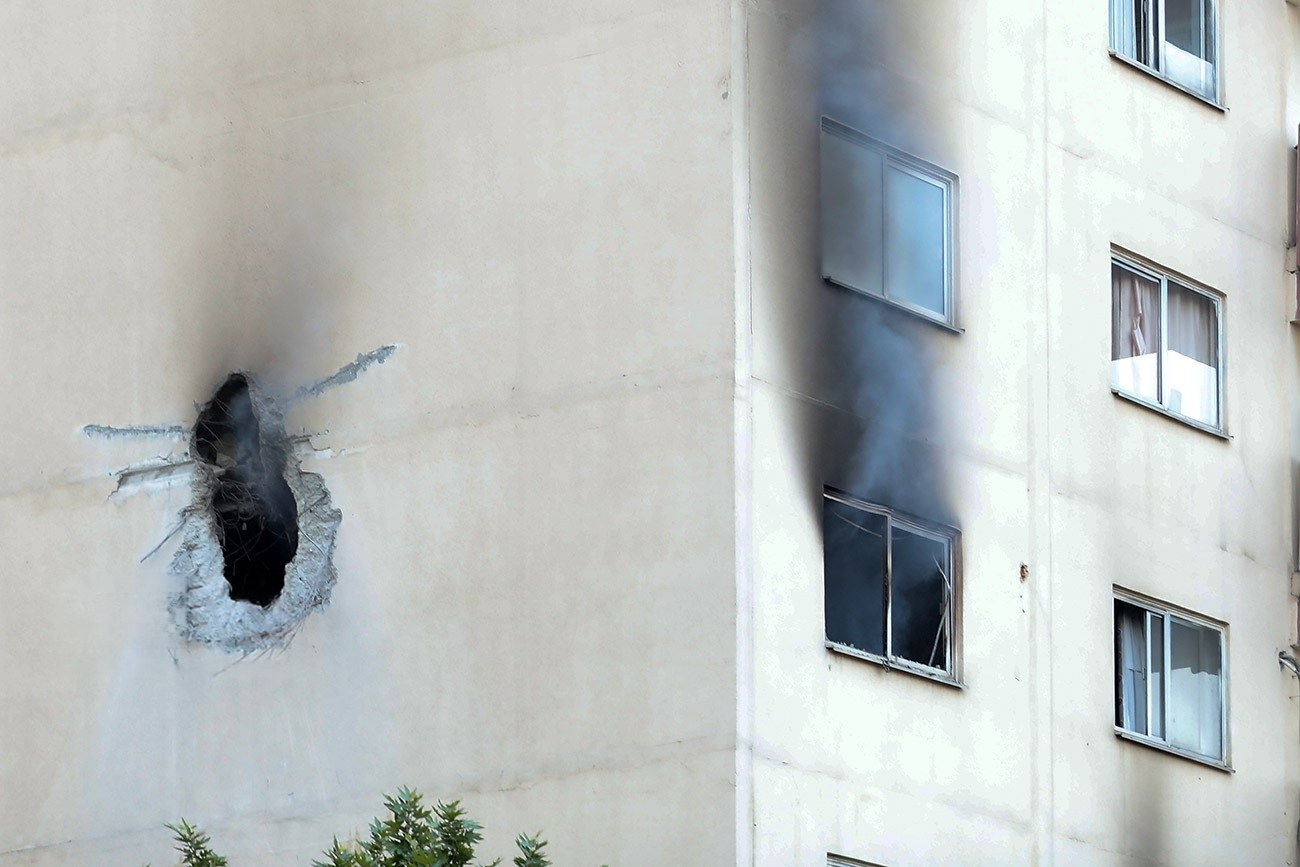
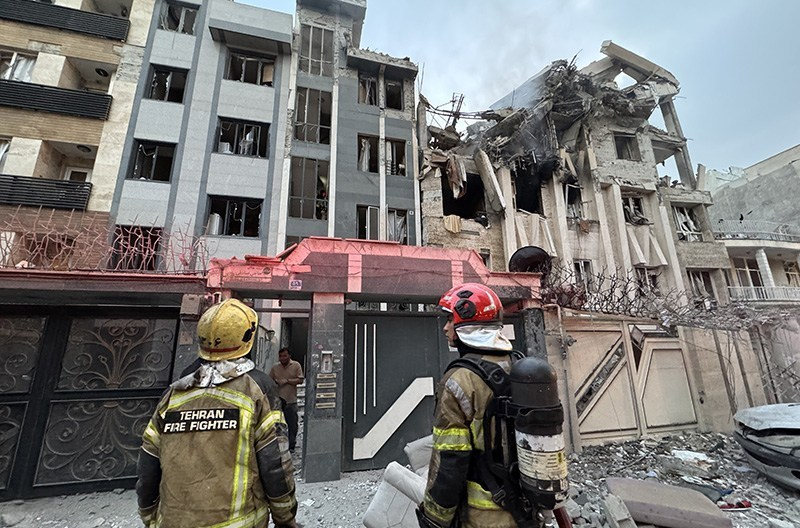
- Israeli airstrike locations at the Natanz Nuclear Facility
- Impact on a building in Tehran
- Aftermath of the Israeli strikes in Tehran

In the early hours of 13 June 2025, the IDF attacked dozens of Iranian nuclear facilities, military bases and infrastructure installations, and key military commanders. By 06:30 IDT, the Israeli Air Force (IAF) had launched five waves of air strikes, using more than 200 fighter jets to drop more than 330 munitions on about 100 targets. Israeli targets included the Natanz Nuclear Facility and other infrastructure of Iran's nuclear program, with no nuclear accidents occurring as a result of the airstrikes. Meanwhile, the Mossad operatives along with commando forces sabotaged Iran's air defense systems and missile infrastructure. An Israeli official said the Mossad had smuggled precision weapons and established a covert drone base near Tehran, which were used to disable air defenses, securing air superiority for Israeli aircraft. The operations in the early hours, which killed 30 Iranian generals in minutes as well as nine nuclear scientists, are referred to as Operation Red Wedding and Operation Narnia.

Israel conducted strikes in Tabriz in the early afternoon, reportedly targeting an area near Tabriz Airport. Explosions also occurred at the Hamadan Airbase the Parchin military base, and the subterranean Fordow Fuel Enrichment Plant. The IDF later confirmed striking the Hamadan and Tabriz airbases and the Isfahan Nuclear Technology/Research Center. Iranian media reported that at least two Israeli fighter jets were downed over Iranian airspace and a female pilot was captured. The IDF denied this.

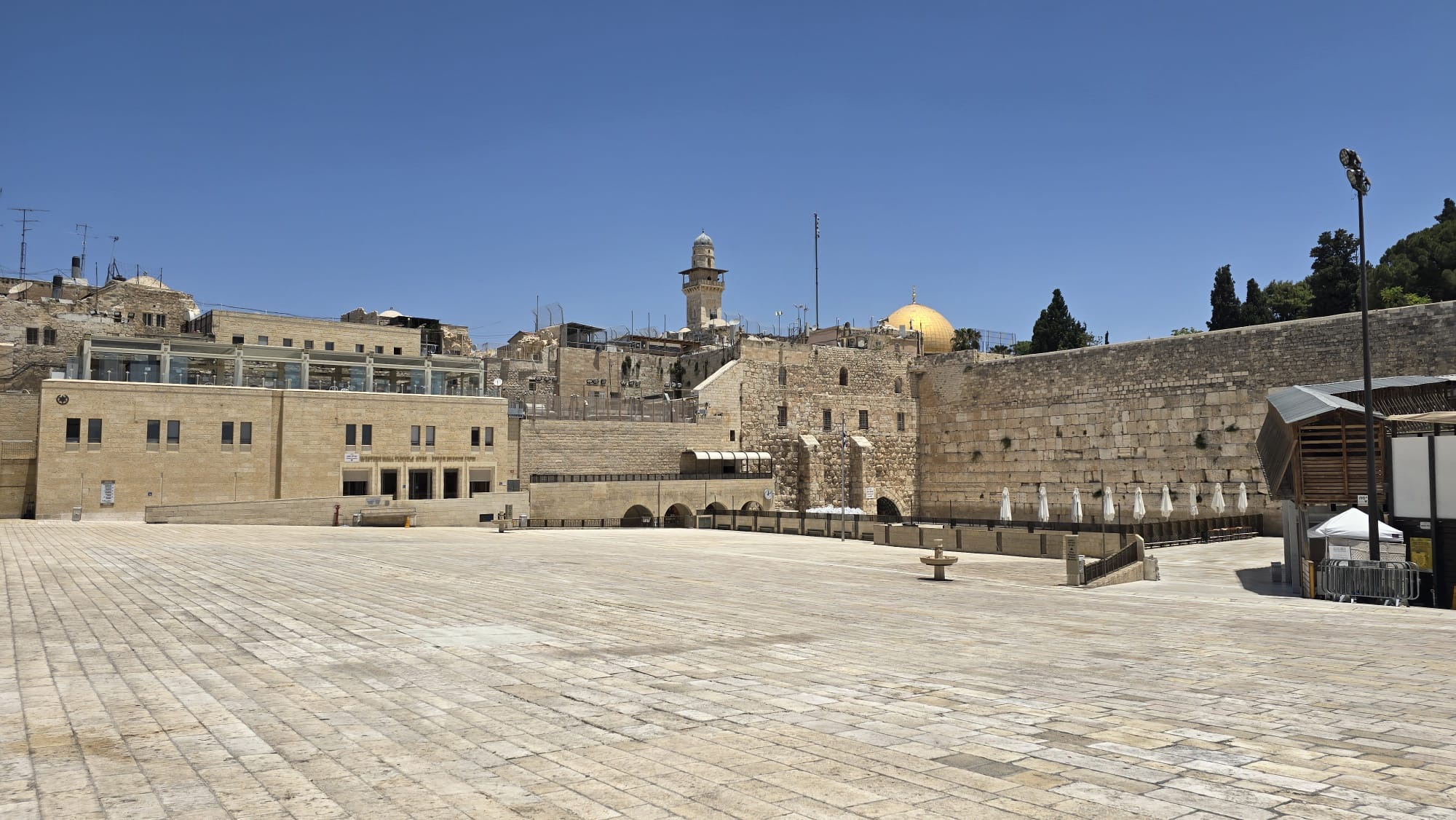
Western Wall Plaza under evacuation orders on 13 June 2025

Civil defense siren and missile explosions sounds, recorded in Central Israel, 13 June 2025 at 21:15

After the Israeli attack, Iranian leaders promised a "harsh response", with attacks against Israeli and US forces in military bases across the Middle East. Shortly thereafter, Iran launched missiles and drones at military bases and air bases under the codename Operation True Promise III. These included more than 100 Shahed drones, according to IDF Brigadier General Effie Defrin. The US evacuated some of its troops from Iraq and also authorized the evacuation of family members of US troops across the region. Around 9 p.m. IDT—10 minutes before dozens of missiles hit—Israeli citizens received IDF Home Front Command phone alerts about an incoming attack. Some Iranian missiles hit targets in Tel Aviv including the Da Vinci high-rise apartment building and shopping centre on the corner of Leonardo da Vinci and Kaplan Streets immediately bordering the Kirya military headquarters near Begin Road; others were shot down. Sirens were activated in Amman, Jordan's capital. Some drones were intercepted by the Royal Jordanian Air Force in Jordanian air space; some by the IAF over Saudi Arabia and Syria. Various Israeli sources said that an order for Israeli civilians to seek shelter was later lifted, suggesting that a majority or all of the drones were destroyed. An intercepted drone fell on a house and wounded three people in Irbid, Jordan.

Several hours later, Iranian state media announced that accurate military and intelligence sites had been targeted in retaliation for earlier Israeli attacks on Iranian territory.

At least 63 Israelis were injured: one critically, one seriously, eight mildly, and the rest lightly, according to Magen David Adom. One civilian woman later died of her wounds. Seven soldiers were lightly injured. The Israel Fire and Rescue Services rescued two people from a building struck in Tel Aviv, while the IDF's Home Front Command rescued another civilian from a building in the city. The IDF estimated that around 150 ballistic missiles were fired in two waves during the attack, which did little damage. Al-Mayadeen reports that Iranian missiles struck a nuclear energy research facility in Tel Aviv. The Israeli military has prohibited the public from sharing photos and videos depicting the damage and destruction resulting from the Iranian missile attack. Elsewhere, The Houthis fired a ballistic missile from Yemen at Jerusalem. It landed in Sa'ir, West Bank, injuring five Palestinians, including three children.

=== 14 June ===
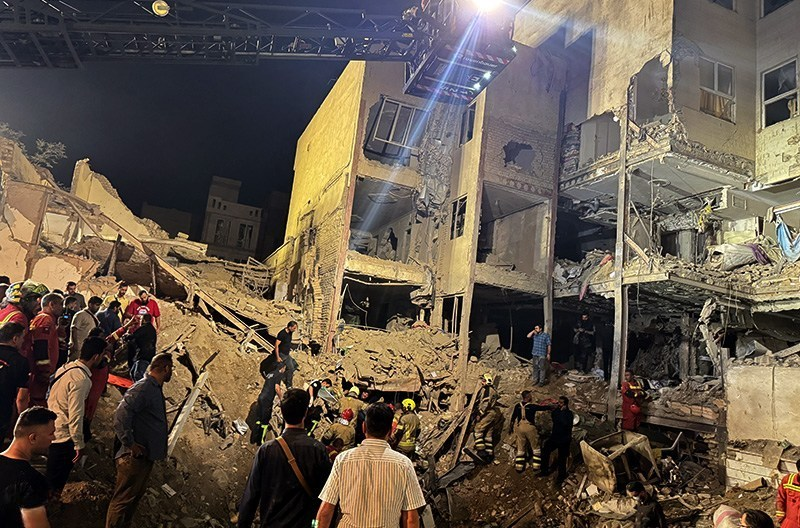
Debris in Narmak, Iran, following an Israeli strike on 14 June 2025

In the early morning of 14 June, Iranian media reported an explosion and a fire at Tehran's Mehrabad International Airport. It also reported Iranian air defenses engaging Israeli projectiles above Isfahan and exchanging fire with Israeli drones on reconnaissance missions in northwestern Iran. The IDF later said that it bombed an underground facility in western Iran used to store ballistic and cruise missiles. Iran confirmed the deaths of General Gholamreza Mehrabi and General Mehdi Rabbani. Iran also made unsubstantiated claims to have downed three Israeli F-35 jets, captured two pilots, and killed a third, and the IDF repeatedly denied claims of air force casualties or damage. Iran's Ministry of Petroleum announced attacks on two oil fields in Bushehr province, where fires halted the production of gas. The Red Crescent Society said Israel had attacked 18 of the 31 provinces of Iran. In the evening, the IDF announced a new wave of strikes on "military targets" in Tehran, which cut off electricity in the Shahran neighborhood, striking oil and gasoline depots, the Iranian Ministry of Defence headquarters, and the Organization of Defensive Innovation and Research building.

Iran launched 200 ballistic missiles overnight, killing two people, injuring more than 60, and heavily damaging several homes were reported heavily damaged, and at least two civilians killed and more than 20 injured. The IDF asserted that a "small number" of missiles evaded air defenses, struck residential areas, and caused casualties in Tel Aviv, Ramat Gan, and Rishon LeZion The US help intercept incoming missiles.

According to Xinhua News Agency, several Iranian missiles transited Syrian airspace en route to Israel, with at least two missiles falling in Daraa Governorate (southern Syria). Reportedly, several Arab states have participated in shooting down Iranian drones, or sharing radar information to help in destroying them.

In the night, Iran fired another barrage of missiles targeting northern Israel, killing five people and injuring at least 23 others. A fire also broke out near the BAZAN oil refinery in Haifa, where pipes and transmission lines were damaged.

The U.S. 6th Fleet stationed five Arleigh Burke class destroyers (Thomas Hudner, Arleigh Burke, The Sullivans, Oscar Austin and Paul Ignatius) in the Eastern Mediterranean Sea to assist with Israeli missile defense and disrupt Iranian air strikes. In February 2026, the Department of Defense awarded the Armed Forces Service Medal to the USS Arleigh Burke for its role in shooting down missiles in the conflict.

=== 15 June ===
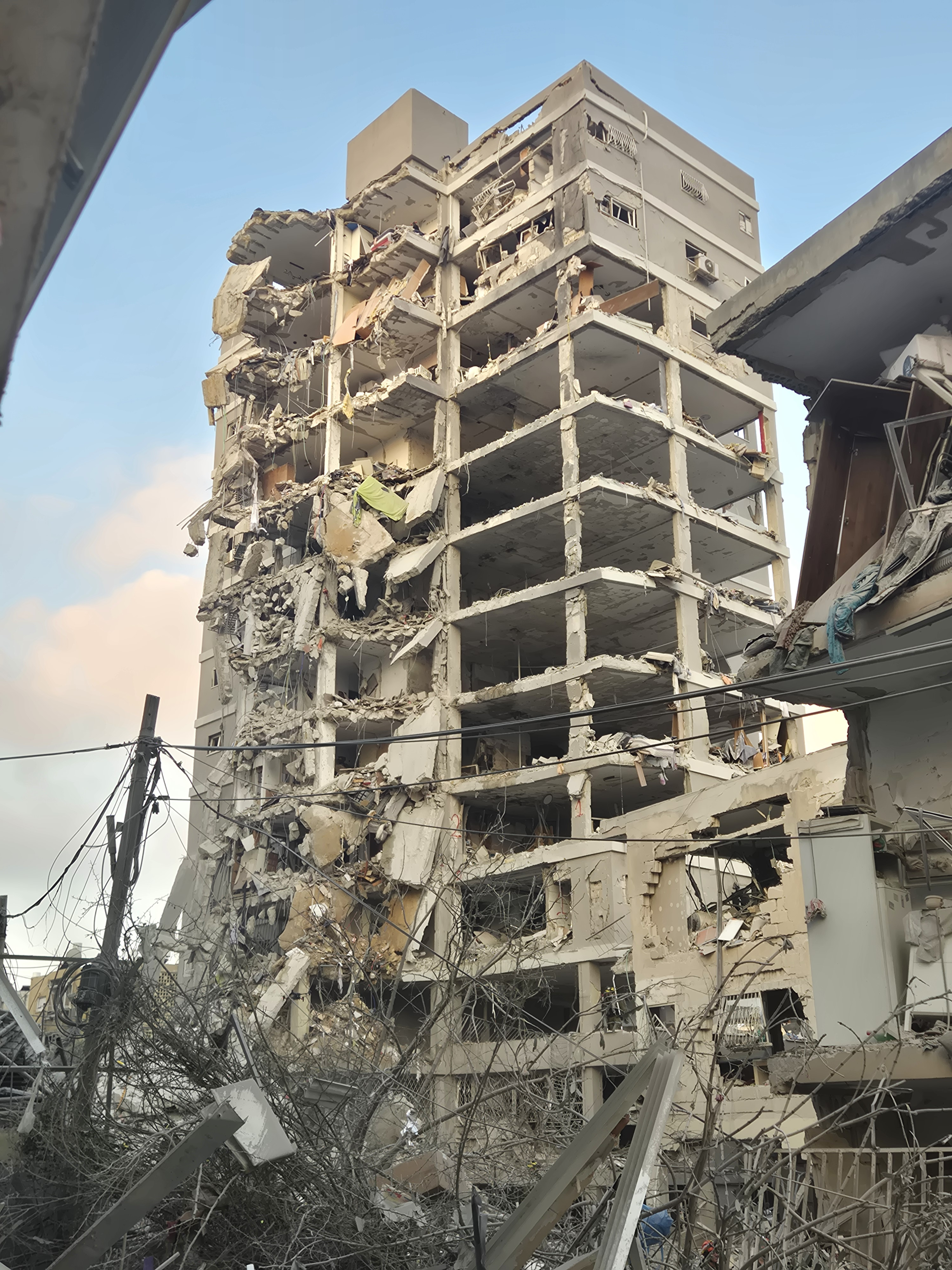
Aftermath of the Iranian attacks in Bat Yam

On the morning of 15 June, Iran and the Houthis in Yemen launched ballistic missiles simultaneously, striking buildings in Bat Yam and Rehovot, a mall in Kiryat Ekron, and in Tel Aviv. In Bat Yam, 61 buildings were damaged, according to Mayor Tzvika Brot. Nine people were killed and about 200 people were injured, according to the MDA. Israel later said that it intercepted most of the missiles and that the remainder failed to enter Israeli territory.

In Rehovot, Iranian missiles struck the Weizmann Institute of Science and damaged dozens of other buildings. Debris from Iranian missiles also hit two sites in the West Bank. A Shahab-class missile caused a rooftop fire in al-Bireh, close to Mahmoud Abbas, the president of the Palestinian Authority. Three children were wounded outside Sa'ir by debris from an intercepted missile.

Later in the day, Iran fired a barrage consisting of several ballistic missiles at Israel, Iran also fired a missile at an area in Caesarea, near the Netanyahu family home. The IDF announced that the missiles were intercepted, with at least 50 rockets downed. In the evening, Iran fired several barrages of missiles at Israel, injuring seven people in Haifa and one in Kiryat Gat, and causing fires and property damage.

A strike was reported on the Ministry of Justice building in Tehran and the IAF said that it bombed a refueling plane at the Mashhad Shahid Hasheminejad International Airport in what was possibly the most distant operation in its history. Israel also struck surface-to-surface missiles in Iran as well as military bases and the Iranian foreign ministry. Missiles struck and killed the intelligence chief and the intelligence deputy chief of the IRGC. Along with the airstrikes, five car bombs detonated across Tehran, with explosions taking place next to government and nuclear-related sites and killing several nuclear scientists. and an Israeli official denied any involvement. The IDF otherwise warned Iranian civilians to evacuate from the areas surrounding weapon factories and military bases in Shiraz.

Iranian president Masoud Pezeshkian reportedly sustained light injuries to his leg following an airstrike targeting a meeting of the Supreme National Security Council in Tehran. He escaped with other officials through an emergency hatch.

=== 16 June ===
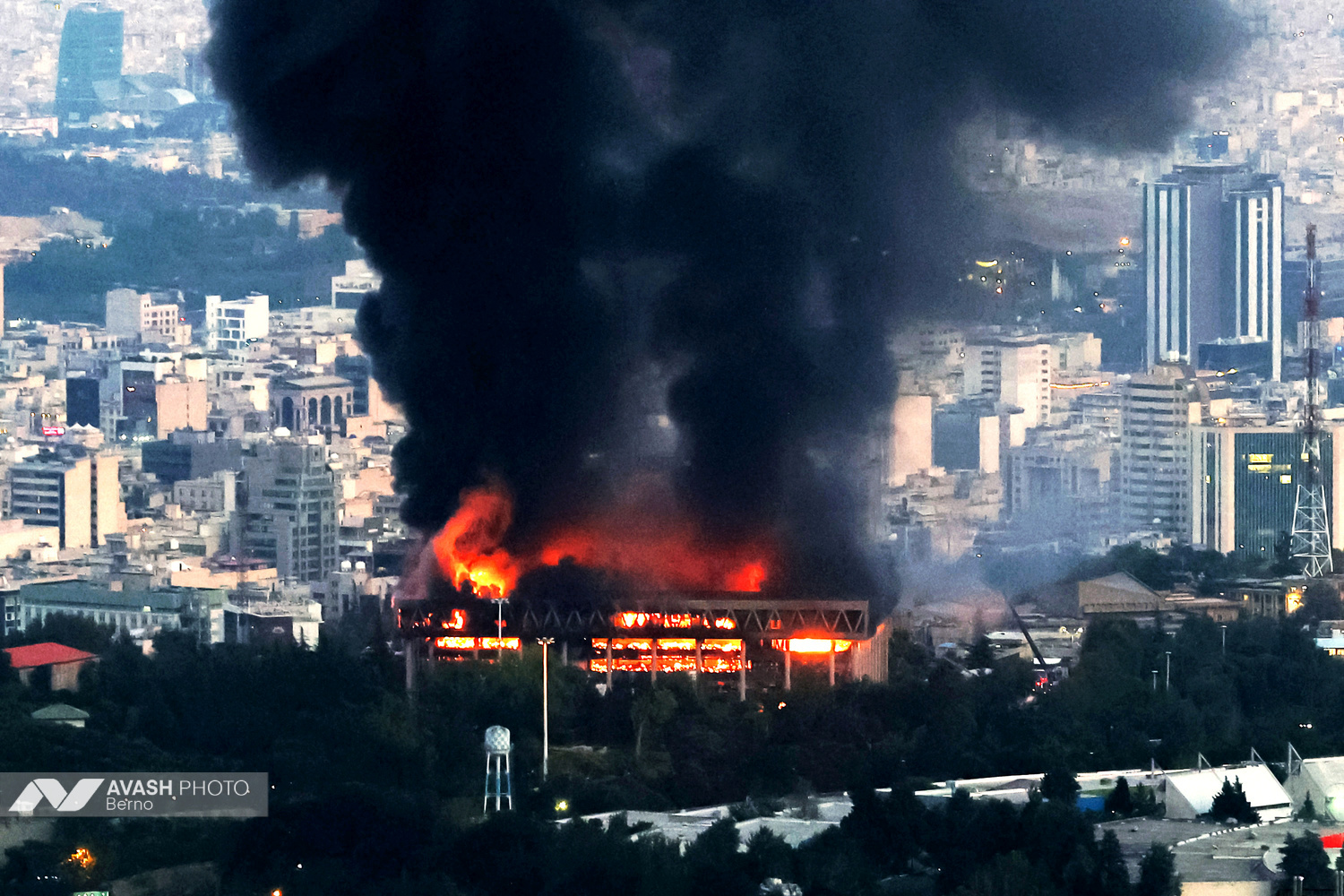
Israeli attack on IRIB studio in Tehran on 16 June 2025

The IDF hit the command center of the Quds Force in Tehran. Iran International reported explosions were heard in the vicinity of the Fordow nuclear facility. IDF strikes were said to have taken place in the vicinity of the Parchin military installations. The IRGC's Ansar al-Mahdi Corps reported that one of its commanders and a soldier were killed in an attack in Ijrud County of Zanjan province.

The IDF said it has destroyed 120 surface-to-surface missile launchers in Iran. Brigadier-General Effie Defrin said that 30% of Iran's missile launchers have been destroyed and said it destroyed a weapons convoy between Tehran and Qom. IRNA reported that Israeli forces struck the Farabi Hospital in Kermanshah, causing significant damage and at least 15 buildings in the Kermanshah missile factory were hit by Israel. Israel bombed the Islamic Republic of Iran Broadcasting (IRIB) state broadcaster during a live broadcast. At least one IRIB employee was killed in the attack, while the station said its offices were struck by four bombs. Israel issued evacuation orders to residents of some areas of Tehran and hit Iranian missile launchers in western Iran. The IDF said one of its drones destroyed two Iranian F-14s. Nour News reported that Iranian forces claim to have shot down an F-35 over Tabriz. The IDF hit a building killing Iran's intelligence chief and other key senior officials. Mohammad Kazemi, Hassan Mohaghegh, and Mohammad Khatami were confirmed to have been killed by the airstrike. According to Iran International, Khamenei was moved to a bunker located in the town of Lavizan, along with his family.

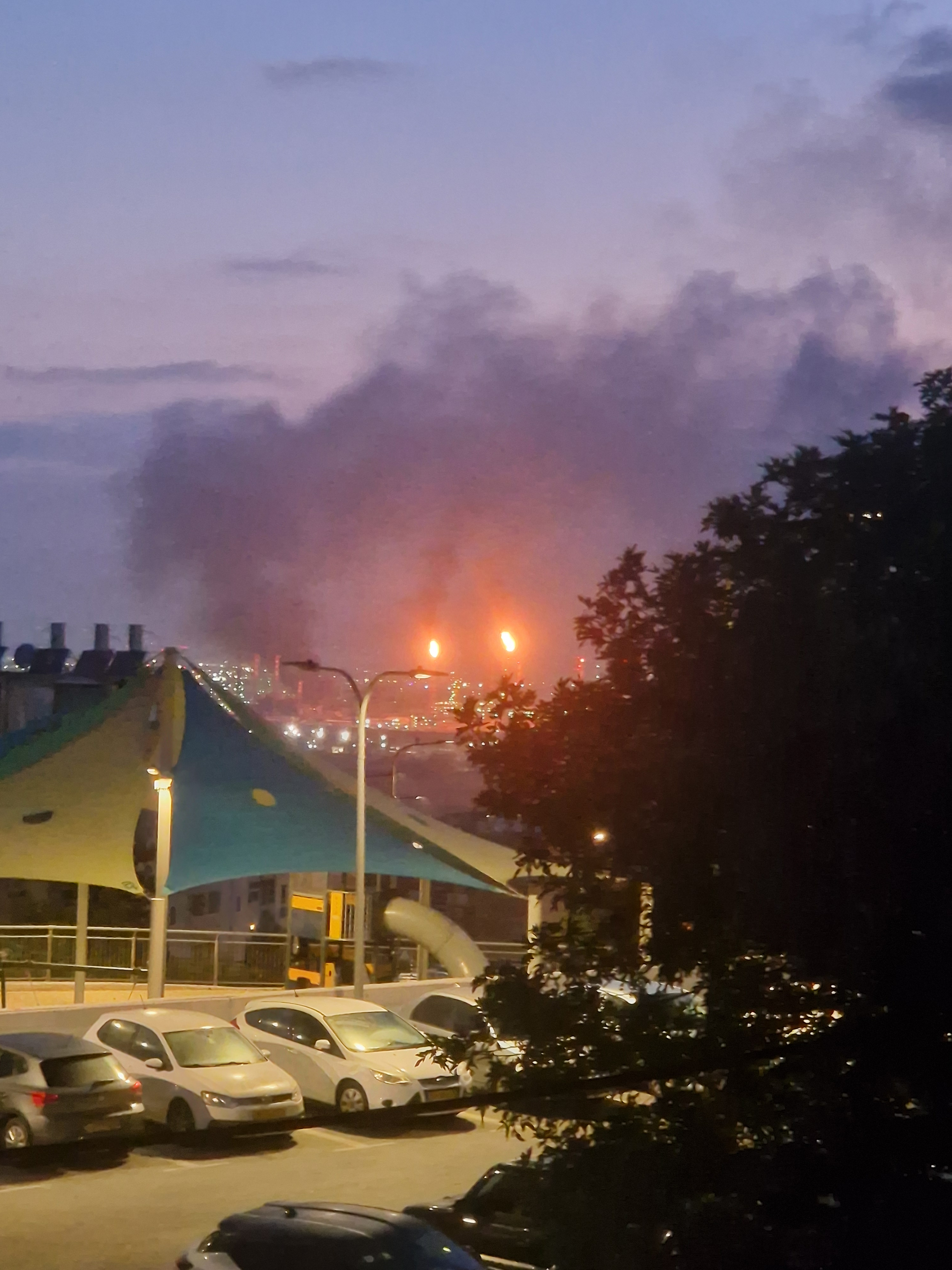
Iran's attack on Haifa oil refineries on the night of 15 to 16 June 2025

Iran launched another barrage of missiles against Israel and fragments were reported to have caused damage to the US Embassy Branch Office in Tel Aviv. A school in Tel Aviv as well as homes in Bnei Brak, Haifa and Petah Tikva were hit. Eight civilians were killed and over 90 were injured. Israel reported 287 people were hospitalized overnight. Haifa's oil refinery was also targeted, causing significant damage and killing three workers. According to Quincy Institute for Responsible Statecraft executive vice president Trita Parsi, successive Iranian missile attacks may have eroded Israeli defenses, allowing a larger percentage of missiles to get through than before. Following the attacks, Israel confirmed 24 fatalities to date, the majority of which occurred outside bomb shelters, and had tallied 350 Iranian missiles, clustering around 30–60 at a time. Additionally, a drone fired toward the US consulate in Erbil, Iraq, was intercepted. Iran fired ballistic missiles at Petah Tikva again, killing four people and injuring 15 people. Among the victims was Holocaust survivor Ivette Shmilovitz. Two missiles also hit Tel Aviv, destroying a number of buildings.

=== 17 June ===
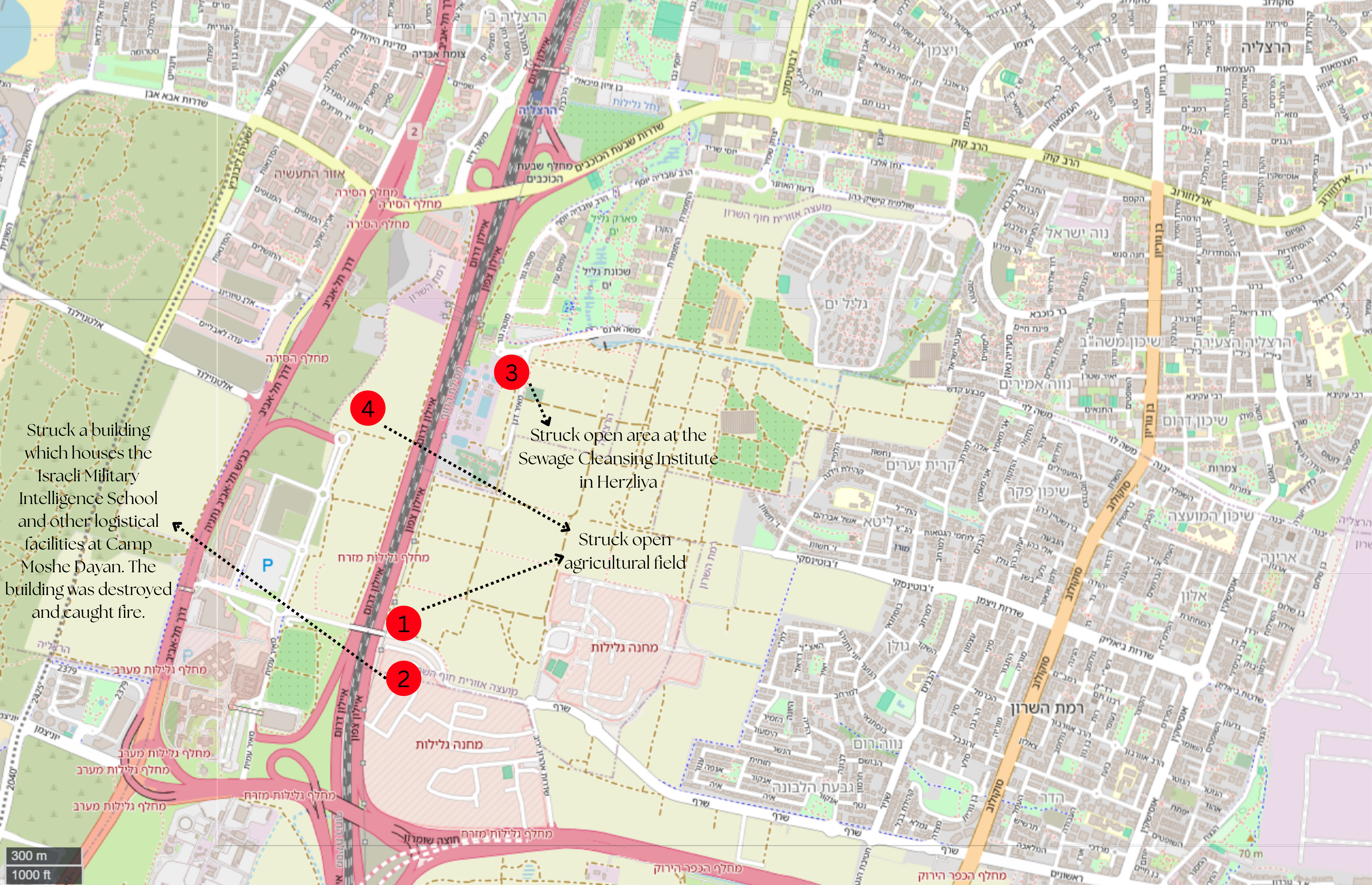
Iranian bombardment against the Israeli Military Intelligence School

In the morning, Iran launched about 20 missiles at Israel, lightly injuring five people, and struck targets across Israel, hitting Tel Aviv as well as residential neighbourhoods in Bat Yam and Tamra. Ynet reported that an Iranian missile struck the city of Herzliya, damaging an eight-story building and setting an empty bus on fire. Explosions were heard in the Dan district surrounding Tel Aviv and West Jerusalem. The IDF said it shot down 30 Iranian drones overnight. The IRGC claimed to have hit a military intelligence centre and a Mossad operations planning centre. Four impacts occurred in Tel Aviv, with one directly striking Camp Moshe Dayan. An Iranian ballistic missile attack toward northern Israel during the evening was successfully intercepted by Israel.

The IDF said 40% of Iran's ballistic missile launchers had been destroyed. The Institute for the Study of War in the US noted that the five morning attacks had fewer missiles than previous salvos, which it held as indicating a degradation of Iran's missile forces.

The IDF assassinated Major-General Ali Shadmani just days after he was appointed as a commander of Khatam al-Anbiya Central Headquarters. According to The Jerusalem Post, Shadmani was killed alongside dozens of IRGC officers. Israel said that it conducted "several extensive strikes" on military targets in western Iran, targeting missile launchers and unmanned aerial vehicle (UAV) storage facilities. According to Mehr News Agency, an Israeli rocket hit a checkpoint in Kashan, killing three people and injuring four others. Israeli forces struck a residential building in Tehran, according to IRNA, which also reported that three people were rescued from the rubble by the Red Crescent. The IDF announced that it conducted heavy strikes against Iranian ballistic missile launchers in Isfahan using 60 fighter jets and that 12 missile storage and launch sites were hit during the attacks. The state-owned Bank Sepah was targeted in a cyberattack, with the hacker group Predatory Sparrow claiming responsibility. Israeli jets hit Iranian missile launchers in western Iran and the Iranian Army claimed to have shot down 28 "hostile aircraft" including a spy drone. Israel denied the latter claims.

=== 18 June ===
The IDF said that 50 fighter jets struck around 20 buildings in Tehran, including factories producing raw materials, components and manufacturing systems for ballistic missiles. Iranian media said that the IDF struck an IRGC-affiliated university and a missile factory in Khojir. The IDF also said it had destroyed 70 missile batteries. Israel also attacked nuclear centrifuge production sites, with the IAEA confirming strikes on Karaj's TESA Complex and the Tehran Research Complex.

In the morning, Israel hit sites in Tehran and issued an evacuation order for people in district 18 of Tehran. Iran's internal security headquarters was destroyed during the attacks, according to Israel. An Iranian Red Crescent building was also reportedly struck. Iranian media reported that Iranian forces shot down a "hostile" F-35 jet in the Javadabad area of Varamin.

In the afternoon, the IDF said that it had struck 40 military targets in western Iran, including a primed Emad missile launcher, missile storage sites, and soldiers, with 25 fighter jets. To date, IDF spokesperson Effie Defrin said that 1,100 targets in Iran had been struck by Israel. He added that five AH-1 helicopters were struck in Kermanshah in the morning. Later, the IDF said that it destroyed three more AH-1 helicopters. The IDF later announced that 60 fighter jets participated in a wave of strikes against 20 targets in Tehran, including weapon manufacturing facilities, centrifuge production sites, and nuclear research and development locations.

During the night Israel downed three Iranian drones. In the evening, Iran fired a single ballistic missile at Israel, setting off sirens in Tel Aviv and the surrounding area. According to the IRGC, the long-range Sejjil missile was used in the attack and one man was lightly injured. By 18 June, the IDF estimated that Iran launched 400 missiles and 1,000 drones at Israel since the conflict began. It added that only 20 missiles impacted urban areas and less than 200 drones entered Israeli airspace.

=== 19 June ===
The IAF hit targets in Tehran with airstrikes during the night of 18 June. In the morning, Israel hit dozens of military facilities in Iran including air defense and missile production sites.

The IR-40 reactor containment building at the Arak Nuclear Complex was destroyed as were nearby distillation towers. Earlier in the day, Israel had told residents of the surrounding areas of Arak and Khondab to evacuate. Israel said there was no danger of radiation leakage. The IAEA said that the reactor was "not operational and contained no nuclear material". The IDF said it believes it has destroyed two thirds of the Iran's missile launchers. The IDF said that its drones struck Iranian soldiers who were repairing ballistic missile launchers.

Overnight Iran fired a ballistic missile salvo at Israel that was intercepted by the IDF. Israel also downed two Iranian drones headed toward the north of Israel. In the early morning, Iran fired a barrage of around 20 ballistic missiles at Israel, striking at least four sites in central and southern Israel, including the Soroka Medical Center in Beersheba, Tel Aviv, Ramat Gan, and Holon. According to Israel's Ministry of Health, 271 people were injured, and a Soroka hospital spokesperson reported significant damage to the hospital. A cluster bomb was also used in the attack, with one hitting a home in Azor.

The Soroka Medical Center suffered a direct hit, causing extensive damage and a suspected chemical leak. Seventy-one people were lightly injured there. Israeli president Isaac Herzog said the hospital was a "beacon of coexistence for Israelis and Palestinians". In Ramat Gan, 22 people were injured, a missile impacted near several high-rise buildings, and several apartment buildings were damaged with 16 people were injured. Later, Iran fired at least 10 missiles at northern Israel, with no reports of impacts or casualties.

=== 20 June ===
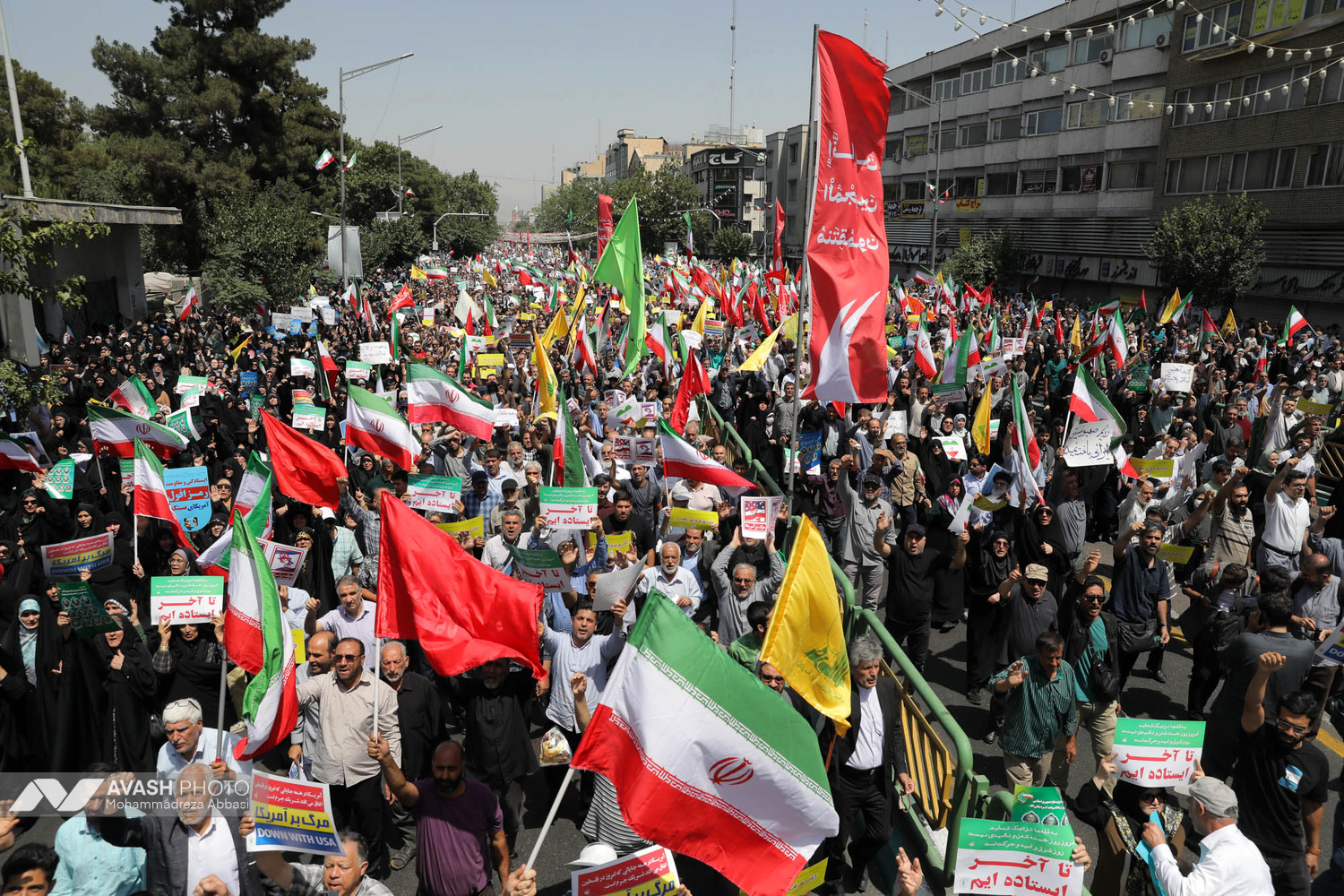
Protest in Tehran against Israeli strikes on Iran, 20 June 2025

Overnight, the IDF claimed to have targeted Iranian military sites, including missile production facilities, the SPND program headquarters, and a Tehran nuclear research center, later reporting the destruction of 35 missile launchers.

While the IDF stated it targeted infrastructure in western and central Iran, Iranian media reported a drone strike on a Gisha district residential building, allegedly a Basij military base, and the assassination of an unnamed nuclear scientist.

Iranian missile barrages struck Beersheba, damaging apartment blocks, the central rail station, and sparking fires near high-tech facilities, resulting in seven civilian injuries. Subsequent strikes involving 25 missiles hit Haifa, striking the Al-Jarina Mosque, as well as central and southern Israel, injuring 23 people. Reports indicated cluster bomb use in Beersheba and explosions in Tel Aviv and Jerusalem. Cabinet secretary Yossi Fox noted that of 520 ballistic missiles fired by Iran, only 25 impacted the ground, a 5% impact rate.

=== 21 June ===
Israel struck three buildings in Isfahan, with Iranian media reporting that a nuclear facility was targeted. Defense Minister Israel Katz said the IDF killed Quds Force commander Saeed Izadi and struck the vehicle of IRGC commander Behnam Shahriyari. Iran confirmed the killing of a tenth nuclear scientist, Isar Tabatabai-Qamsheh.

The IAEA stated that a centrifuge workshop in the nuclear research complex in Isfahan was destroyed by the Israeli strikes. IAF struck a residential building in Qom, while explosions were reported over Najafabad, Malard, Isfahan and Tehran. Israeli airstrikes targeted a nuclear site in Isfahan, according to the deputy provincial governor who spoke to the Fars new agency. Fars reported that the air defense system in Isfahan had been activated. The IDF said that it hit a military installation in Shiraz, no casualties were reported, and following an Israeli airstrike, the headquarters of the Iranian Cyber Police (FATA) in Tehran sustained significant damage.

The IDF announced that it attacked dozens of military targets in the Ahvaz area, using 30 fighter jets that dropped around 50 munitions. Among the targets were a ballistic missile storage facility and a radar site. A strike in Tehran killed a former bodyguard of assassinated Hezbollah leader Hassan Nasrallah alongside a member of Kata'ib Sayyid al-Shuhada. Later, the IDF said that around 60 fighter jets conducted strikes in central Iran in the evening, destroying three F-14 fighter jets.

Fires broke out in Tel Aviv and the nearby city of Holon after Iran launched a new wave of missiles and struck a residential building in Beit Shean, although no injuries were reported. (Note: Attributed to multiple sources:) The IDF said that it intercepted 40 Iranian drones overnight, and added that 470 drones were shot down since the war began, a 99% interception rate. An Iranian Shahed-136 managed to strike a home in Beit She'an, causing damage, while another hit an open area near Highway 90 in the Arabah area.

=== 22 June: US strikes on Iran nuclear sites ===
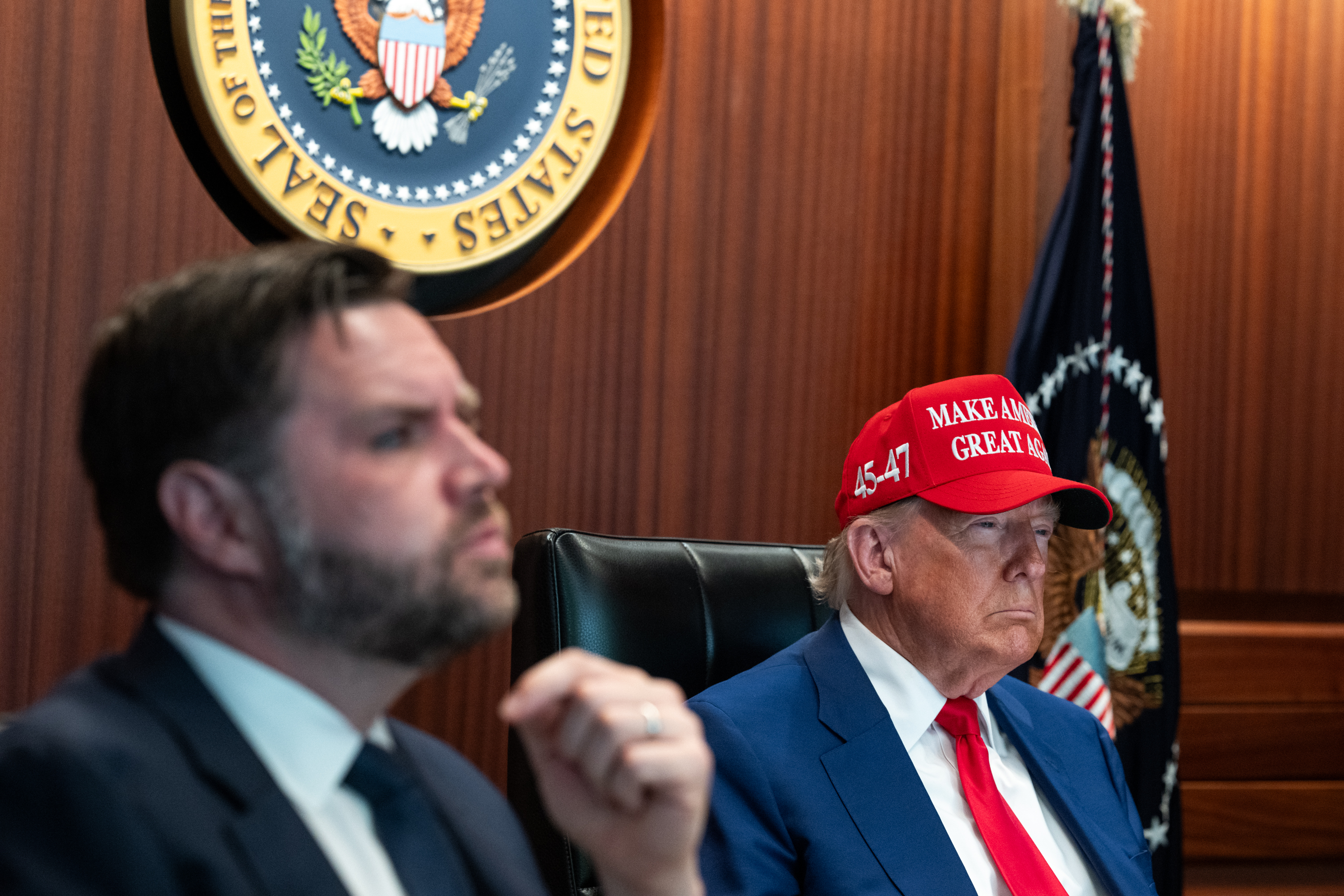
President Donald Trump and Vice President JD Vance in the Situation Room of the White House during the attacks, 21 June 2025 (EDT)

According to the IDF, 20 fighter jets conducted overnight strikes on dozens of military targets in central Iran, including weapons production and storage sites, air defenses, and infrastructure at Isfahan International Airport. In the morning, the IDF said that it destroyed two Iranian F-5 fighter jets at Dezful Airport alongside eight ballistic missile launchers, killing nearby soldiers. Strong explosions were heard in Tehran, Isfahan and Bandar Lengeh, with Iranian air defense systems being activated.

Explosions were also heard in Bushehr. Iranian media reported that Israel struck a power plant and a military garrison in Yazd. The IDF confirmed conducting simultaneous strikes in the areas of Isfahan, Bushehr, Ahvaz, and Yazd, using 30 fighter jets that dropped around 60 munitions. Among the targets were the 'Imam Hussein' strategic missile headquarters in Yazd, an Iranian drone regiment headquarters, air defense battery factories, missile launchers, and drone storage sites. The strikes killed several Iranian military personnel who were operating at launch platforms.

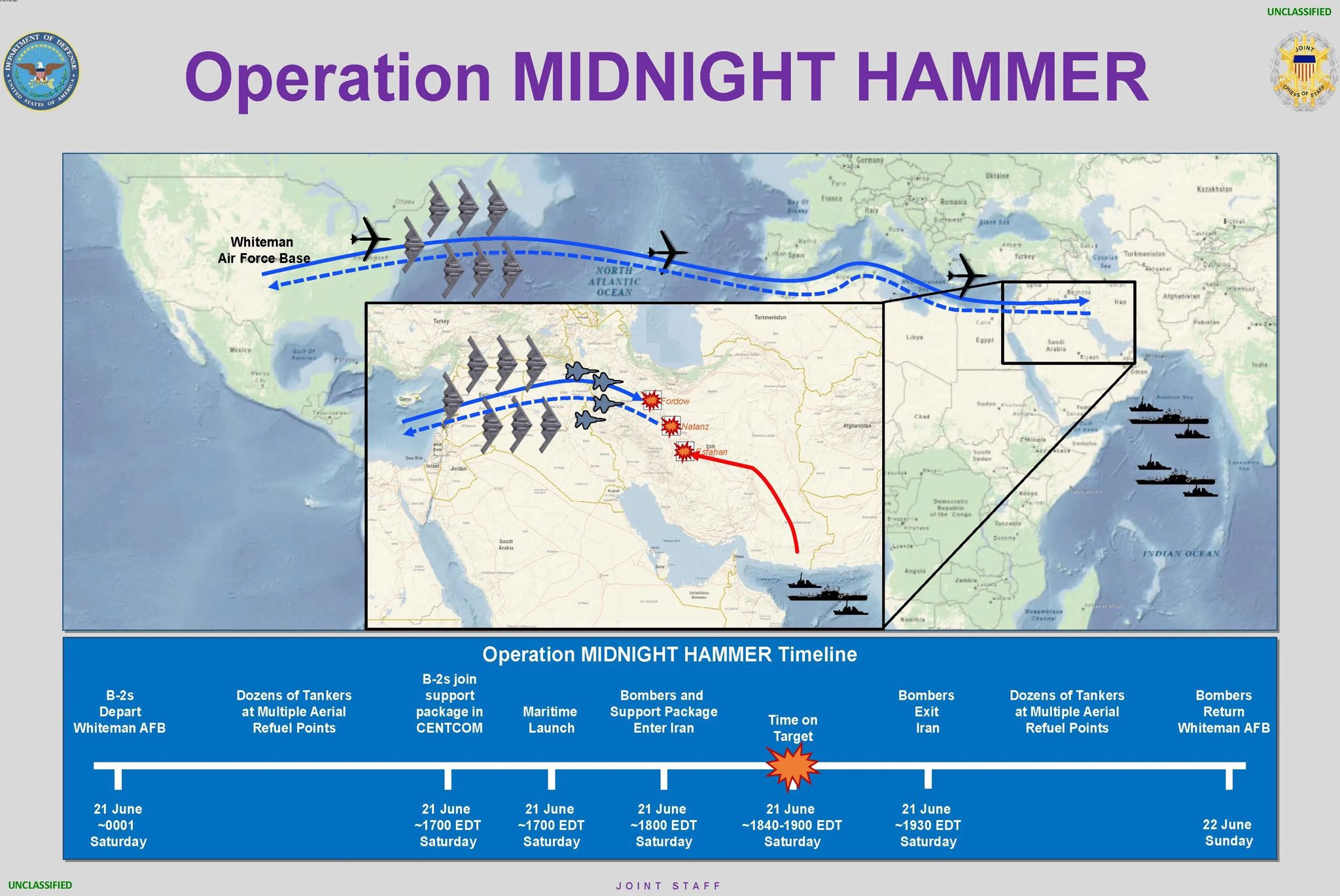
Timeline of the U.S. strikes on Iranian sites

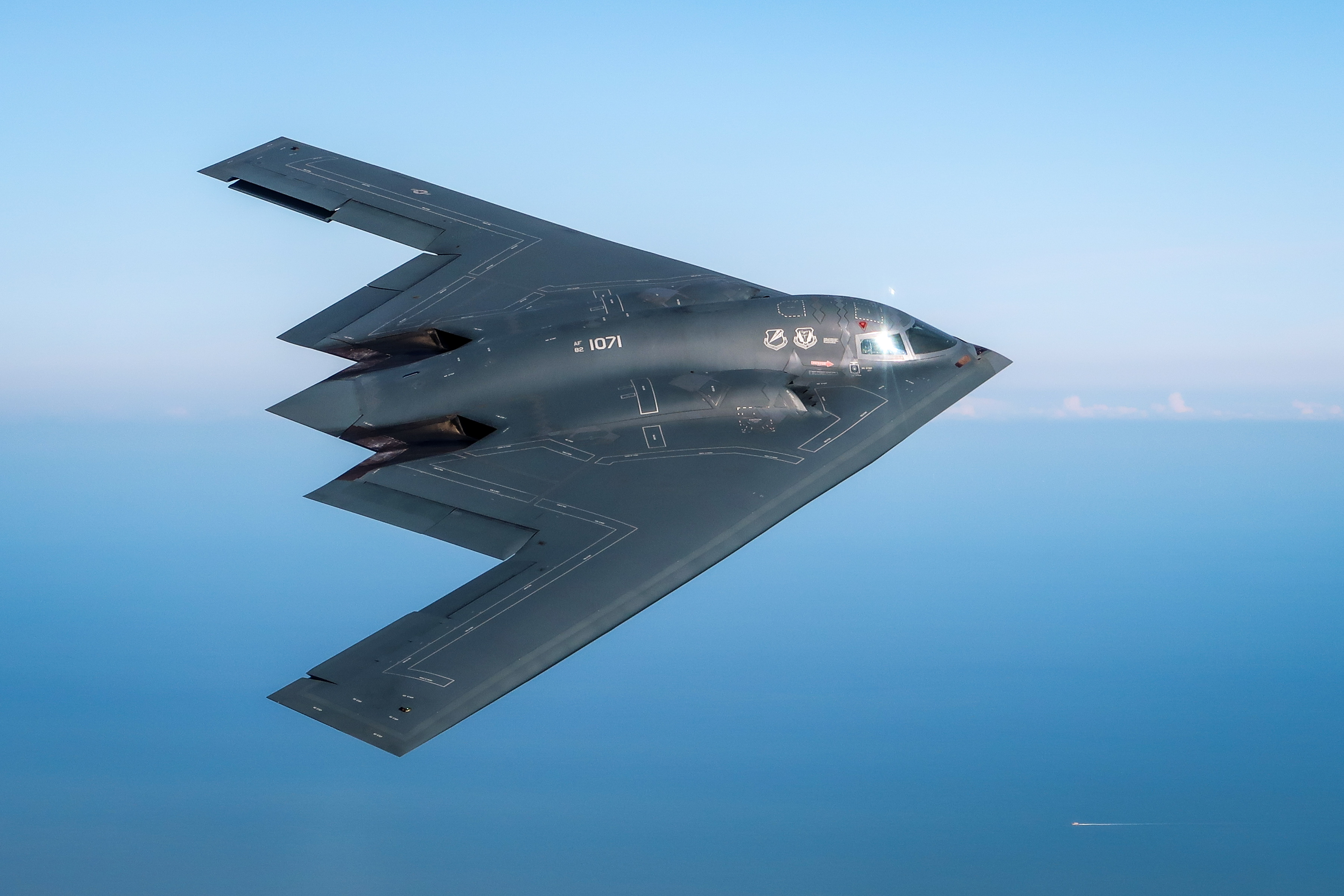
A Northrop B-2 Spirit plane, used by the U.S. in the operation

Later, the IDF said that 20 warplanes dropped 30 munitions against targets that included ballistic missile sites, satellites, and radars in Kermanshah and Hamadan, and an air defense system in the center of Tehran.

Iranian media reported that an Israeli Hermes 900 drone was shot down by Iranian air defense. The Iranian media also reported that Majid Masibi, who the Islamic Republic accused of "spying for Israel", had been executed.

The IDF stated that Iran launched 27 missiles at Israel in two barrages with 11 sites being hit spanning from the occupied Golan Heights, to the Upper Galilee, to the northern and central coastal areas of Israel and "extensive damages" were reported in Tel Aviv and Haifa. Eighty-six people were injured in the strikes. Thirteen people were lightly injured when a strike hit a building in Tel Aviv, and six others were hurt in Ness Ziona. A man was moderately hurt on Route 431 near Be'er Ya'akov. An undetected Iranian missile also hit a public square in Haifa, lightly injuring three people.

President Donald Trump Delivers Address to the Nation, June 21, 2025 (4:13)
Trump addresses the nation regarding the strikes, 21 June 2025 (EDT)

Donald Trump addresses the nation on the United States strikes on Iranian nuclear sites during the Twelve-Day War
audio only version

On 22 June, the United States joined the war on Israel's side and struck the Fordow, Natanz, and Isfahan Iranian nuclear sites, using B2 bombers and Tomahawk missiles. President Trump falsely claimed that the targeted facilities were "totally obliterated". In response, the Iranian government said that the Fordow site was not seriously damaged. IRIB said that only Fordow's exit and entry tunnels were destroyed but not the facility itself. Later on, however, Iranian Foreign Minister Abbas Araghchi admitted that nuclear sites sustained severe damage. Although initial U.S. intelligence assessments indicated that the U.S. airstrikes did not destroy Iran's nuclear capability and only delayed it for a few months, the Pentagon has since concluded that it set back Iran by one to two years. Satellite images of Fordow facility were released by the Associated Press shortly after the strikes. The images showed damage to the entrances of the facility which are blocked by dirt, and also several large holes/craters in the mountain which the facility is under.

Prior to the strikes, satellite images of the facility appeared to show increase in logistics, with multiple trucks/heavy machinery gathering near the site, suggesting a possible move of Iran's nuclear material. Later, an Iranian source informed Reuters that they had moved the majority of enriched uranium out of the facility to an unknown location prior to the strikes.

According to the IAEA, no new radiation has been detected from Iran's nuclear facilities since the US attack. Israel said that it was in "full coordination" with the US in planning the strikes. Pirhossein Kolivand, head of the Red Crescent, said that the strikes caused no fatalities. On 25 June, Trump stated that people sent by Israel confirmed the destruction of the site.

Protests erupted in Tehran against the US attacks on nuclear facilities, with President Masoud Pezeshkian joining in the protests.

Following the attack, during his remarks at the 2025 The Hague NATO summit, Trump said that the nuclear facilities were "obliterated" but called the intelligence "very inconclusive."

The Iranian Parliament voted to close the Strait of Hormuz shortly after the American strikes took place, although the Supreme National Security Council was responsible for deciding whether to do so.

=== 23 June: Iran strikes on US bases ===
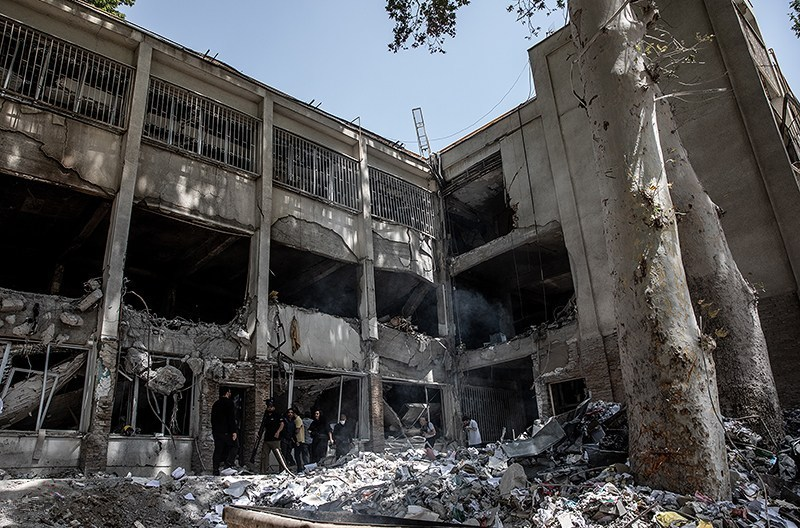
Damage to Evin Prison in Tehran following Israeli airstrikes on 23 June 2025

Iran launched 15 missiles toward Israel with shrapnel from Israeli interceptors falling in several cities. Explosions were heard in Jerusalem, causing sirens to sound for 30 minutes. The IDF said that the attack consisted of five separate barrages, each made of several projectiles. It also said that most of the missiles were shot down by air defenses. The Israel Electric Corporation said that power disruptions were caused in southern Israel after a missile struck close to a "strategic infrastructure facility". Iranian media reported that the rocket attack were organized by the IRGC and impacts were reported in five locations including Safed, Tel Aviv, Ashkelon, Ashdod, and Beisan while Israeli media reported four explosions including one in Ashdod and Tel Lachish, south of West Jerusalem. Israeli media reported air sirens in Israeli communities including Nahariya, Gesher Haziv, Hila, Me'ona and Mi'ilya.

News reported that Iran had launched what they described as "devastating and powerful missile" strikes on US military bases in Qatar. According to TRT Global, Iranian state television had confirmed the operation since 23 June, citing military sources who said the attacks were in direct response to unspecified incidents that happened on Iranian territory. Iran launched at least six missiles on the American Al Udeid Air Base in Qatar with explosions being reported over Doha. It called the attack "Operation Annunciation of Victory". According to Qatari officials, the missiles targeting Al Udeid were intercepted and no casualties occurred. American bases in Iraq were reportedly also targeted, which was denied by an official.

Israeli strikes hit six airfields located in western, eastern, and central Iran, targeting runways, underground facilities, and a refueling aircraft. The strikes destroyed 15 Iranian fighter jets and helicopters such as the F-14, F-5, and AH-1. Israel also targeted missile launchers and storage facilities in Kermanshah. The IRGC shot down an Israeli Hermes 900 drone in Khorramabad.

Iranian state-controlled media reported that an alleged spy, Mohammad Amin Mahdavi Shayesteh, was convicted and hanged for his connections to the Mossad.

Around 50 Israeli warplanes conducted extensive strikes in Tehran, dropping over 100 munitions in the span of two hours. The IDF targeted military command centers and infrastructure, and internal security forces, with an Israeli official estimating that hundreds of IRGC fighters were killed. Locations hit included the Basij headquarters, Evin Prison and the Palestine Square Countdown Clock. In addition, Israel said it attacked Fordow's access routes. The strike hit the entrance of Evin prison, while Israeli foreign minister Gideon Sa'ar posted "long live freedom". Iranian sources said that Israel struck an electric station in Evin, causing power cuts, and Shahid Beheshti University, although the university itself denied it. A spokesperson for the Iranian judiciary later said that at least 71 people had been killed in the attack on Evin prison.

==== Announcement of ceasefire ====
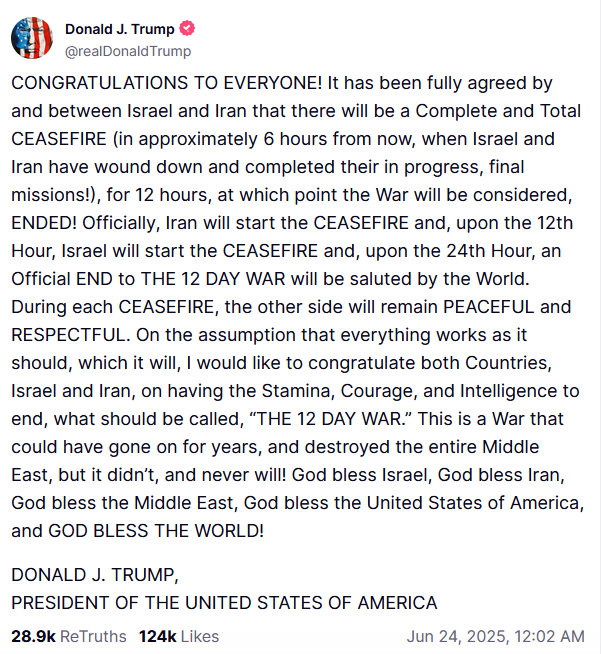
Trump posting about the ceasefire on Truth Social, on 23 June, 6:02 p.m. EDT

Following reports – later denied by the IDF – that Israel was running low on defensive interceptors and resupply efforts were putting the US in a 'bind', at 6:02 p.m. EDT on 23 June, Trump declared on social media that Iran and Israel had agreed to a ceasefire that would take effect the next day, labeling the conflict as the "12 Day War". Iran's minister of foreign affairs, Abbas Araghchi, contested this declaration, saying that no ceasefire proposal had been agreed to, but he stated that Iran would cease its military action if Israel likewise ceased hostilities "no later than 4 a.m. Tehran time". At 6:45 a.m. Tehran time, Iranian air defense were activated in Tehran, and Iran fired another salvo of missiles at Beer Sheva at 7:07 a.m. At 1:08 a.m. EDT (8:08 a.m. in Tel Aviv, 8:38 a.m. in Tehran) Trump stated that the ceasefire had begun and asked all sides not to violate it.

Despite its volatile beginnings and initial violations by both Iran and Israel, the ceasefire held as of 24 June, in part due to Trump's continued direct intervention with Netanyahu.

=== 24 June: Last missile exchanges and ceasefire ===
The IDF stated that it killed hundreds of Basij operatives overnight and a nuclear scientist ahead of the announced ceasefire. Ali Bagheri also stated that nine people were killed in Israeli airstrikes on residential buildings in Gilan province overnight. Israel, after agreeing to a ceasefire with Iran, resumed its strikes, confirmed that it struck a radar system near Tehran in retaliation, and accused Iran of violating the peace deal by firing two missiles at Israeli cities. Iranian air defenses responded to continued Israeli strikes on the capital, with Iran firing another salvo of missiles at Beer Sheva.

Early morning, Iran launched a total of around 20 missiles at Israel, targeting the country's north, south, and center. Four people were killed in Beersheba and 22 others were injured, and several buildings were damaged. The IDF also stated that it intercepted two UAVs apparently launched from Iran around the same time as the missiles. Iraqi state media reported drone attacks on sites in Iraq: Iraq's Taji military base, the Imam Ali Air Base the Balad Air Base and the US Victory Base Complex. Sabah al-Numan, the military spokesman for the Iraqi Prime Minister, said several kamikaze drones targeted Iraqi military sites, severely damaging radar systems at the Taji military base and Imam Ali Air Base, while others were intercepted by Iraqi air defenses.

Later that morning, Israeli officials said that another wave of missiles were launched from Iran after the ceasefire went into effect, with the IDF stating that two missiles fired by Iran at 10:30 a.m. local time on Northern Israel were intercepted. Iran initially denied the attack but later stated that Israel conducted strikes until 9 a.m. local time.

Iranian media reported sounds of explosions in Tehran, stated that the northern city of Babolsar was under attack, and that Israel had confirmed a strike against a radar facility near Tehran; Netanyahu's office stated it was destroyed.

== Post-ceasefire ==
On 25 June, the IDF stated that it intercepted a UAV apparently launched by the Houthis. On 28 June, another Houthi missile was intercepted by the IDF.

A series of drone attacks were launched on airbases and oilfields in Iraq, allegedly by Iranian-backed militias. The attacks began with the enforcement of ceasefire in the 12 day war.

Iranian state broadcasters claimed that three suspected Mossad operatives were executed in Urmia.

On 26 June, French defence minister Sébastien Lecornu confirmed to the media that French forces in the region had intercepted Iranian drones targeting Israel prior to the ceasefire, stating that French Rafale jets and ground-to-air systems intercepted "less than 10 drones in the last few days" of the conflict. According to Lecornu, Iran had launched around 400 ballistic missiles and 1,000 drones towards Israel during the 12-day conflict.

In a public address on 27 June, President Trump was asked if the U.S. would consider bombing Iran again if intelligence suggested a dangerous level of uranium enrichment; he responded: "Sure, without question." In addition, Trump referred to Khamenei's statement where Khamenei declared victory, saying: "you're a man of great faith. A man who's highly respected in his country. You have to tell the truth. You got beat to hell". He added, "I wish the leadership of Iran would realize that you often get more with honey than you do with vinegar. Peace!"

On 28 June, state funerals were held in Tehran for 60 people, including military commanders and nuclear scientists, killed in Israel's attacks. The IDF meanwhile stated that it likely intercepted a ballistic missile launched by the Houthis.

On 5 July, Ali Khamenei made his first public appearance since the war began, attending a mourning ceremony on the eve of Ashoura in Tehran amid speculation over his whereabouts during the conflict.

On 6 July, the Houthis attacked a Liberian-flagged cargo ship in the Red Sea, killing three mariners and wounded two others.

In August 2025, Iran released information and photos of the person they claim is a female pilot that they captured on 13 June.

In December 2025, Iran's military admitted that earlier reports claiming it had shot down two Israeli F-35 fighter jets during the conflict were false.

On 5 January 2026, the Israeli Security Cabinet held a five-hour meeting and authorized additional strikes on Iran, following Netanyahu-Trump discussions and statements made the week before. Codenamed Operation Iron Strike, the expectation is that any new strike, and even the threat of new strikes, would further destabilize the Islamic Republic of Iran politically as it undergoes the ninth day of a mass street uprising in multiple cities across Iran.

On 28 February 2026, Israel and the United States launched strikes on Iran, beginning the 2026 Iran war.

== Casualties ==
By 20 June, HRANA estimated that strikes on Iran had left at least 657 people killed and 2,037 wounded. According to NBC News, the Iranian health ministry states that more than 2,500 people have been wounded. In total, the IDF reported killing at least six senior military commanders. At least 79 people were killed during the Israeli attack on Evin Prison.

Two regional sources reported on 15 June that the death toll of Iranian nuclear scientists rose to 14, including some killed in car bombings. The governor of Iran's East Azerbaijan province said 31 people were killed during the first day's strikes in the province, including 30 soldiers and one member of the Iranian Red Crescent Society.

In Israel during the war, 525 ballistic missiles were launched from Iran toward Israel. Between 50 and 60 of them struck the Israeli territory, and 8 missiles resulted in civilian deaths. Magen David Adom reported that 28 people had been killed by Iranian attacks, while the Ministry of Health added that 3,238 others had been hospitalized, including 28 in serious condition, 111 in moderate condition, and 30 in undetermined conditions. The remaining individuals were lightly injured or treated for panic attacks. Over 9,000 others were displaced.

== Impact ==
=== International ===
Flights were also suspended from Israel's airports and both Iraq and Jordan closed their airspace. Israel declared a state of special emergency, shut down its airspace, closed schools and banned large social gatherings. Israel also called up tens of thousands of IDF reservists in preparation for an Iranian retaliation. The IDF announced that all of its pilots involved in the strikes returned unharmed.

The Community Security Trust issued warnings to the Jewish communities in the United Kingdom and France. Jewish Community Protection Service asked French Jews to be "extremely vigilant". The Jerusalem Post reported the Anti-Defamation League was monitoring the situation within the United States. The NYPD said they are increasing security at Jewish sites across New York City. New York governor Kathy Hochul said that the state is closely monitoring the situation, increasing security at sensitive sites and cybersecurity operations. New York City mayor Eric Adams and Police Commissioner Jessica Tisch said that they are deploying officers to Israeli embassies for protection, with Tisch saying: "That heightened deployment continued today and will continue for the next several days".

On 15 June, the US embassy in Iraq warned Americans may be targeted in attacks. The State Department issued a level 4 travel advisory for Iraq. On 17 June, CNN reported that India evacuated its students from Tehran through the Armenia–Iran border. On 18 June, three Iranian government planes flew from Iran to Oman, one of those planes is the presidential plane, believed by some analysts to be Iranian diplomats heading to Oman for ceasefire talks. Airlines stopped flying over Israel, Iran, Iraq and Jordan, diverting some flights and canceling others. Iranians stood in lines for fuel and stocked up on food.

Crude oil prices increased by 10% over the course of the 12-day conflict, as the OPEC+ coalition of producers, which includes Saudi Arabia, Russia, Iraq, the United Arab Emirates, Kuwait, Kazakhstan, Algeria, and Oman, made substantial cuts to their output. Oil prices experienced a significant decline after Iran launched an attack on the US-operated Al-Udeid Air Base in Qatar. EU gas prices increased by 18% over the course of the 12-day conflict, and then decreased to previous levels.

=== Diplomacy ===
The United Nations Security Council meeting on 13 June concluded with statements from Iran's and Israel's respective ambassadors to the UN. The Iranian ambassador Amir-Saeid Iravani stated that Israel's attacks constituted a declaration of war, accusing Israel of premeditated aggression and of a direct violation of the UN Charter. The Israeli ambassador Danny Danon presented the attacks as "self-preservation for the state of Israel", asserted that they were prompted by a failure of diplomacy, and declared that he had come to seek "recognition that the international community has failed to stop Iran's nuclear programme". Following the attack, diplomatic talks about nuclear energy between US and Iran which were scheduled to take place in Oman were indefinitely suspended.

On 15 June, Cypriot President Nikos Christodoulides announced he received a message from Iranian President Masoud Pezeshkian meant for the Israeli government, which Christodoulides will discuss in a scheduled phone call with Netanyahu. That same day, Israeli media reported that Iran had approached the governments of Qatar and Oman to contact the United States in order to request a cessation of Israeli attacks. Trump announced that "many calls and meetings" were underway to broker a ceasefire, which was expected to take hold shortly, adding he anticipated a deal "soon". On 16 June, the Iranian foreign ministry reported that the Islamic Consultative Assembly, the nation's parliament, had begun drafting a proposal to exit the Non-Proliferation Treaty, while insisting that Iran did not intend to pursue nuclear weapons. Several foreign ministers of European countries told Iran to return to diplomacy and "avoid escalation".

Iran denied asking to come to the White House and said of Trump "The only thing more despicable than his lies is his cowardly threat to 'take out' Iran's Supreme Leader", Iran also said it will not negotiate under duress and threatened anyone who threatened it.

On 24 June 2025, a ceasefire between Israel and Iran formally took effect at approximately 04:00 GMT, following coordinated diplomatic efforts led by the United States.

On 8 October 2025, in a Fox News interview, Trump said there was a "set of circumstances" that enabled the Gaza war peace plan, some of them were Israeli and American strikes in Iran aimed at destroying the Islamic Republic's nuclear program.

=== In Israel ===
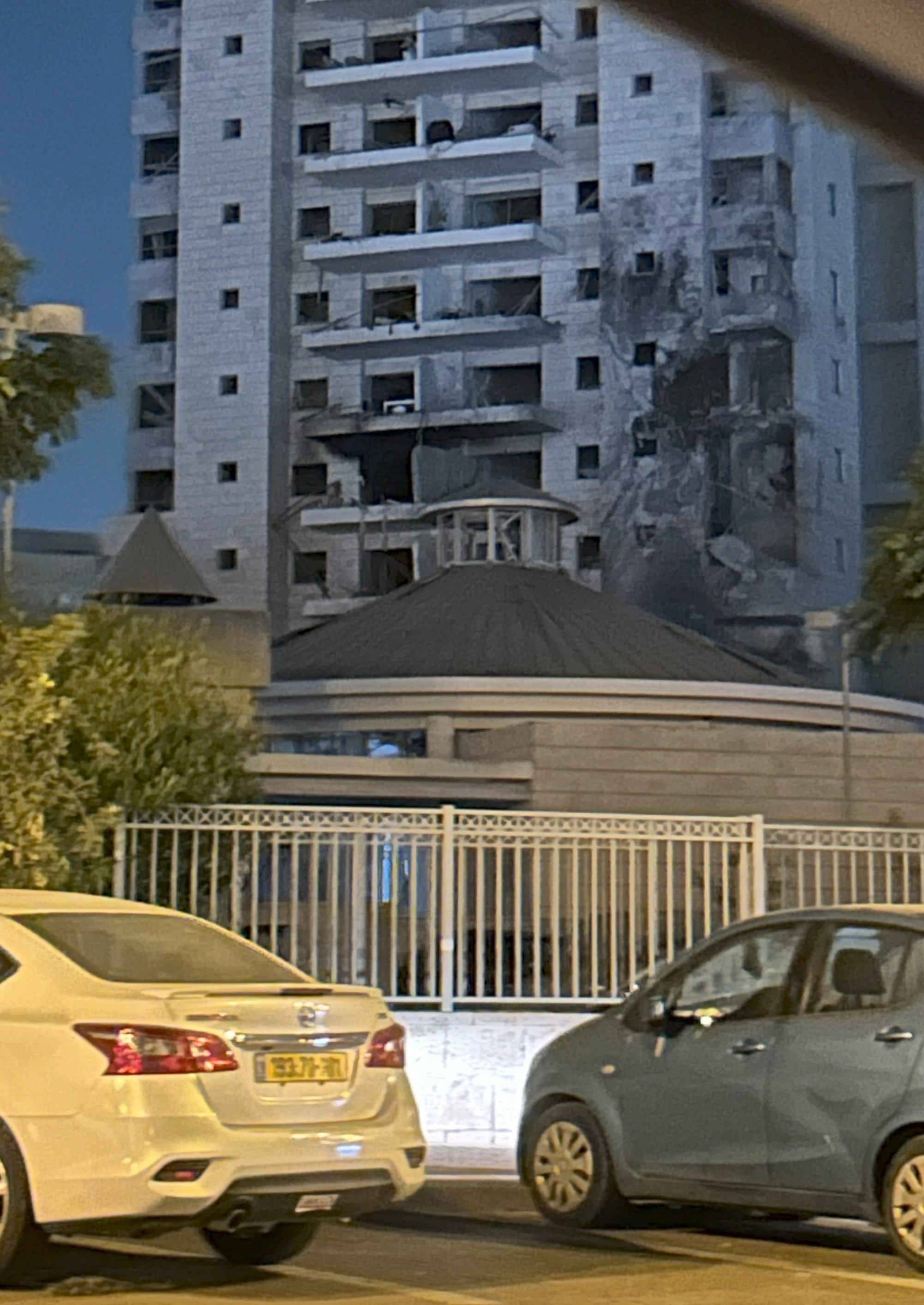
Residential building in Petah Tikva after an Iranian attack

Following the initial Israeli strikes on Iran, Israel declared a state of maximum alert, with the IDF urging civilians to remain in shelters in anticipation of further attacks. Public gatherings were prohibited, schools were closed, and flights at Israel's main airport were canceled as precautionary measures. Iran threatened to target American, British, and French bases and vessels in the region if they assist Israel in countering Iran's strikes.

Israel launched an airlift operation to repatriate 100,000 Israelis stranded abroad due to the conflict. Israel's flag carrier El Al, along with local airlines Israir and Arkia, announced that they would participate, with El Al stating that repatriation flights were scheduled from Athens, Budapest, Milan, Rome, Paris, and London. Cruise ship operator Mano Maritime also announced its intent to participate. The first two flights departed from Larnaca, Cyprus, on 18 June and returned hundreds of citizens.

The Iranian attack on the Weizmann Institute, a "world-leading multidisciplinary research institution in the natural and exact sciences" caused severe damage to advanced medical and biological research. A Weizmann professor told The Times of Israel that colleagues from around the world have shown solidarity with the institute. Israel has consistently targeted Iranian nuclear scientists for assassination in a bid to undermine Iran's nuclear program. Additionally, it is reported that the institute is collaborating with Israeli defense establishments. The strike wiped out a hub of cancer research that had international reach. Scientists report that "everything inside was lost", including "irreplaceable samples" from cancer patients from the United States, France, Switzerland, and other countries, decades‑old cell lines, cancer biomarker studies, and anti-cancer vaccinations research. Many other research labs were ruined by the attack, including the neuroscience lab. Among the lost research material, the most valuable scientifically was more than 2000 transgenic Drosophila lines, a tool for genetic research.

During the war, there was a shortage of bomb shelters among Arab towns, causing frustration among Arab Israelis about safe spaces in times of missile attacks. In response, a network of Arab professionals teamed up to create a website that locates shelter areas for local residents in these towns. Mahdi Kabaha, one of the co-founders of the project, stressed that the group is "filling the gap that the state is supposed to fill" and expressed dissatisfaction with the lack of preparation from the state on this matter before the war began.

On 25 June, Israeli defense minister Katz signed an order to designate the Central Bank of Iran and other Iranian banks as terrorist organizations because they were allegedly financing Iranian militant groups the day after the ceasefire agreement. He said that his move was made to target "the heart of the Iranian regime's terror financing system, which funds, arms and directs terror throughout the Middle East".

Although most Iranian missiles launched at Israel during the war were intercepted, 36 are known to have directly impacted Israel, causing significant damage. Seven missiles struck oil and power facilities, and six hit five military and intelligence facilities, including the Tel Nof Airbase and Camp Glilot, which contains the main base of Unit 8200. The Wall Street Journal reported that in the final days of the conflict Israel's inventory of defensive missiles was depleting, raising concerns regarding the effectiveness of its long-range missile defense systems. Iran adapted its missile tactics during the 12-day conflict, increasing its success rate from 8% to 16% by using more advanced, longer-range missiles and varying attack patterns, exposing vulnerabilities in Israel's sophisticated missile defense systems. Iran's most effective strikes occurred on 22 June, when 10 out of 27 missiles hit Israel.

The Haifa refinery, the largest in Israel, was entirely shut down for two weeks and was not expected to reach full capacity until October, incurring a loss of around US$300 million. Central Bank Governor Amir Yaron told Bloomberg that the war with Iran had cost Israel about 20 billion shekels (US$5.9 billion), or about 1% of its gross domestic product. He predicted that Israel could face a budget deficit.

During the war, the IDF occupied 250 Palestinian homes in the West Bank, expelling the residents and turning them into temporary military bases. On their return days later, multiple families reported extensive damage, filth and theft.

A report from The Daily Telegraph, utilizing radar data from Oregon State University that monitors bomb damage in conflict areas through satellite images, revealed that Iranian missiles hit several important military sites with "remarkable accuracy." These targets included the Tel Nof Airbase, the Gelilot intelligence base, and the Ziporit facility for armor and weapons manufacturing. In total, the Iranian missile attacks caused 28 deaths, destroyed 2,305 homes within 240 buildings, damaged two universities and one hospital, and forced over 13,000 Israelis to evacuate their homes.

By 20th June 2025, at least 8,000 were reported to be homeless. By 24th June 2025, the war had left at least 15,000 Israelis homeless.

=== In Iran ===
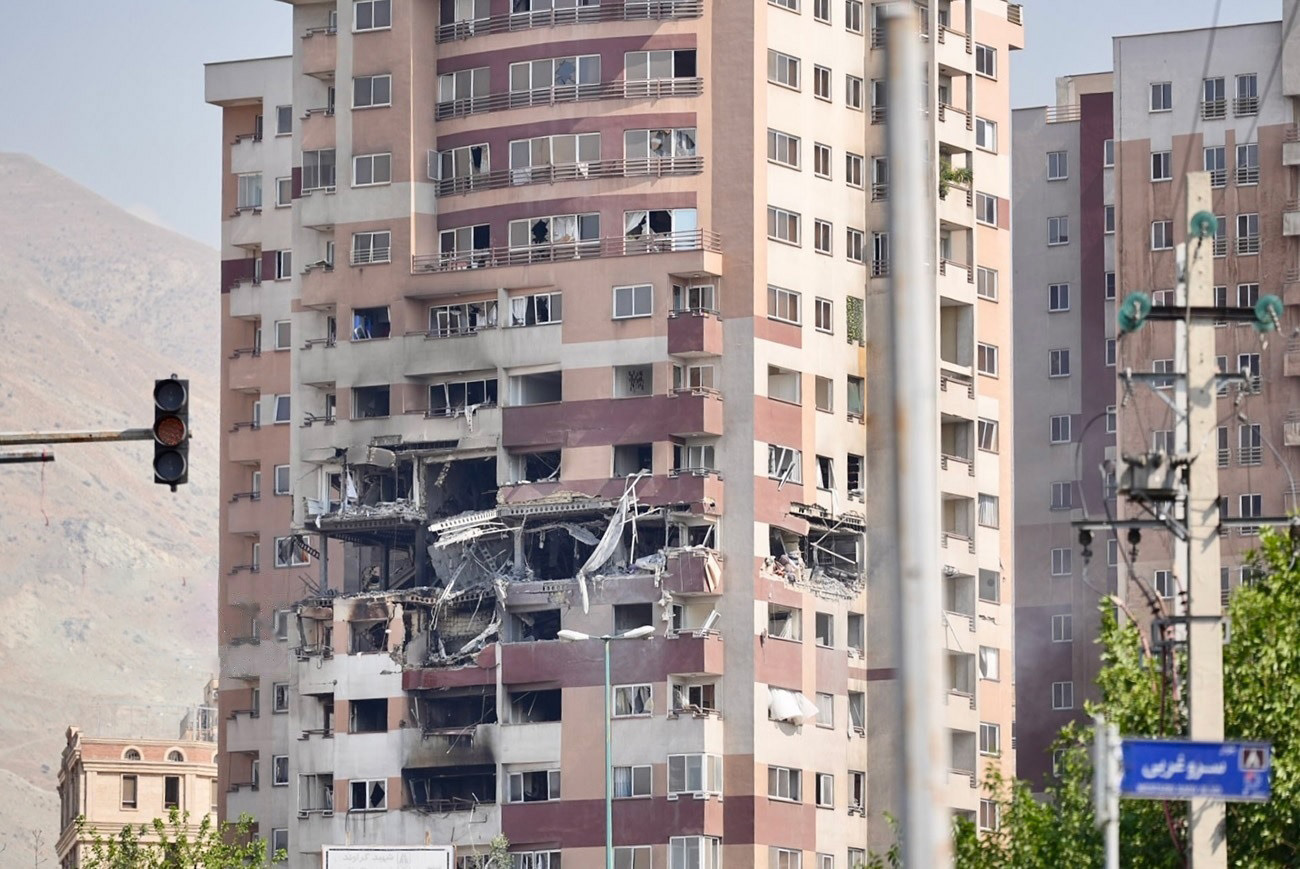
A residential building in Tehran with missile damage, 13 June 2025

CNN reported that Iranians as of 15 June were fleeing major cities in Iran.

Tasnim News Agency reported that Iranian authorities suspended flights at Imam Khomeini International Airport, although the facility itself was not directly affected by the attacks. Return flights were canceled for pilgrims in Saudi Arabia.

After the initial attack, widespread internet outages were reported across major Iranian cities. According to the Guardian, Iran was fearful of Israeli online aggression and almost completely shut down the internet at one point during the war. Local sources told the Guardian that no one except journalists working for accredited foreign media outlets had access to the internet. A student in Tehran told the Guardian he felt "walled in", another said that the blackout limited citizens to using local apps, which the government might use "to spy on us". On 19 June, Iran blocked the internet for more than 12 hours according to NetBlocks. On 21 June, Iran International reported that according to Netblocks the internet was disconnected again. Digiato reported that citizens said they had no internet access.

Authorities told Iranians to delete WhatsApp over concerns regarding data gathered being shared with Israel. WhatsApp in response said they are "concerned these false reports will be an excuse for our services to be blocked at a time when people need them the most" and stated that it does not share any information with any government.

In response to the shutdown, Elon Musk's SpaceX reactivated its Starlink satellite internet service for Iran. According to reports, the move was intended to provide Iranian civilians with uncensored access to the internet during the conflict.

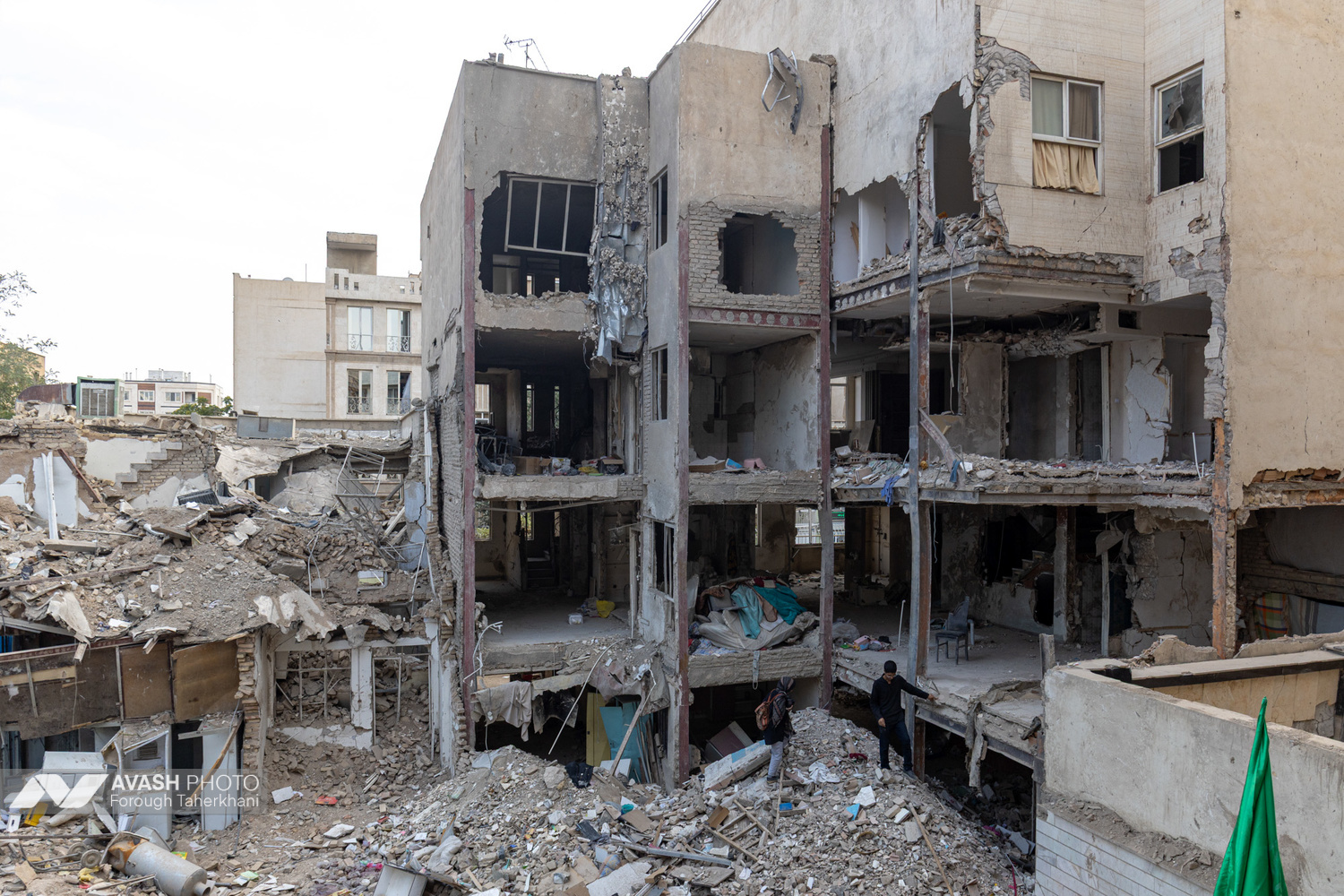
Aftermath of an Israeli strike on a residential building in Tehran

A hacking group linked to Israel claimed responsibility for stealing $90 million (£67 million) from an Iranian cryptocurrency exchange, a day after it claimed to have destroyed data from Iran's Bank Sepah.

On 12 August 2025, Iranian police said they had detained 21,000 suspects during the war, including 260 accused of spying and 172 for illegal filming. The Jerusalem Post reported that most arrests of individuals accused by Iranian authorities of being "Zionist collaborators" have occurred in the country's Kurdish regions (Iranian Kurdistan). Several Kurdish men were charged with espionage and subsequently executed in public. Amnesty International subsequently described the execution rate as "the highest figure recorded in decades," intended to suppress dissent among Iran's minority populations.

=== Israel's use of military, cyber, media and psychological tools ===
Discussions with high-ranking officials from Israel's intelligence sector disclosed the methods employed in the attack, which integrated both human and artificial intelligence. "This operation represents the culmination of extensive efforts by the Mossad aimed at undermining Iran's nuclear initiative," stated Sima Shain, a former director of research at Mossad. Israeli operatives covertly transported a number of drones and missile systems into Iran.

Israeli media indicates that the killings of Iranian military leaders and various Israeli actions stemmed from Israeli intelligence activities. Reports indicated that Mossad penetrated the Iranian security system and that Israeli intelligence operatives attempted to influence public sentiment via media assaults. The Iranian government instructed its officials to refrain from using Internet-connected smartphones because of data breaches.

=== Iranian nuclear program ===
Iran's uranium enrichment facilities at Natanz and Fordow were seriously damaged, according to Foreign Minister Abbas Araghchi and the IAEA. Experts consulted by The New York Times concurred that all of the working centrifuges at the sites were likely destroyed. The Isfahan research center, which could be involved in nuclear weapons development, was also damaged.

Before the war, the IAEA estimated that Iran's 400-kilogram (880 lb) stockpile of enriched uranium was enough for 10 nuclear bombs. The status and location of this stockpile is unclear. Based on pre-attack satellite imagery of trucks at nuclear sites, the IAEA and some Israeli and Western officials believe Iran may have evacuated it. Since Iran may have other locations where it can install centrifuges, the IAEA and many analysts, including Richard Nephew, concluded that the nuclear program was only set back by a few months. After a "low confidence" Defense Intelligence Agency assessment to this effect was leaked, a Pentagon spokesman said "We have degraded their program by one to two years."

Citing the extensive damage to nuclear sites and assassinations of key scientific personnel, the Institute for Science and International Security concluded that "The time Iran would need to build even a non-missile deliverable nuclear weapon has increased significantly." Other Israeli and Western officials contended that Iran could not have easily moved its uranium stockpile and it was buried under the rubble of the attacked sites, so recovery attempts would be detected.

Nicholas Miller of Dartmouth College and Rosemary Kelanic of the think tank Defense Priorities suggested the war only strengthened Iran's ambition to achieve a nuclear deterrent, and began a "cat and mouse game". According to The New York Times, US intelligence had determined that entering the war would likely lead Iran to lift the 2003 fatwa against nuclear weapons.

On 23 June, the Iranian parliament approved an outline of a bill fully suspending Iran's cooperation with the IAEA, intending to block the installation of surveillance cameras, inspections, and the IAEA's receiving of reports. On 25 June, the parliament voted in favour of the bill, allowing the suspension to start.

On 2 July, Iranian president Masoud Pezeshkian ordered the country to suspend cooperation with the IAEA, though the order included no timetables or details about what that suspension would entail. Israeli Foreign Minister Gideon Saar called the decision "scandalous" and urged the European nations which were part of the 2015 Joint Comprehensive Plan of Action nuclear deal with Iran to implement the "snapback clause", reimposing all UN sanctions. A team of IAEA inspectors left Iran on 4 July.

== Misinformation ==
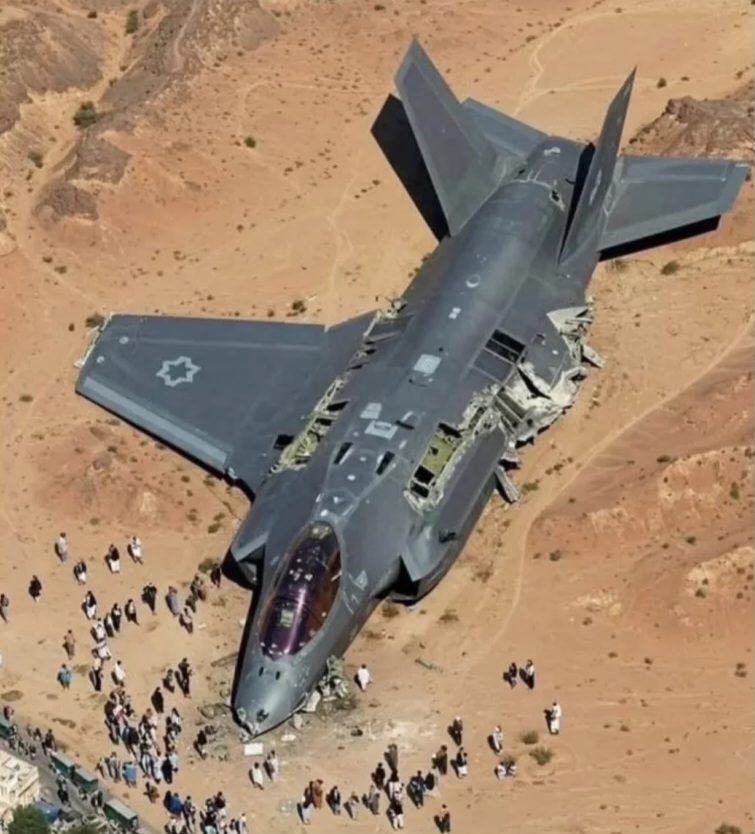
A commonly shared fake AI-generated image that reportedly shows a damaged Israeli jet

During the conflict, there were widespread psychological warfare and misinformation campaigns by both Israel and Iran. These campaigns made use of social media and AI tools to be "more intense and more targeted than anything that had come before". Roi Soussan of the Israeli fact-checking organisation FakeReporter said, "What sets this war apart from others is that our researchers found clear narratives aimed at the Israeli public, and clear narratives aimed at the Iranians that are pretty similar".

BBC Verify reported on 21 June that "a wave of disinformation has been unleashed online" following Israel's strikes on Iran, including AI-generated videos that boasted of Iran's military capabilities. Pro-Palestinian social media accounts shared a video that falsely claimed to show an Israeli F-35 being shot down. It gained 21 million views, but the footage was actually from a flight simulator video game and was later removed by TikTok. The three most-viewed Iranian fake videos collectively gained 100 million views across multiple platforms.

According to the CEO of Alethea analyst group, the surge in such content is linked to Russian influence networks that have shifted focus from undermining support for Ukraine to spreading doubt about the effectiveness of Western, especially American, military technology. She noted that since Russia lacks a direct counter to the F-35, it instead aims to weaken support for the aircraft through disinformation. Other analysts have noted that the large amount of disinformation marks the first time generative AI has been used at scale during a conflict. Pro-Israel social media accounts also circulated old clips of Iranian protests and gatherings, falsely claiming they showed increasing Iranian support for Israel's campaign.

After Israel's 13 June strike, AI-manipulated video clips of Pakistani Defence Minister Khawaja Asif, former IRGC commander-in-chief Mohsen Rezaee and Trump, aimed at depicting Pakistan as Iran's accomplice, were posted online and subsequently picked up by media outlets such as the Daily Mail, Indian adversarial media and Arab news networks. The Tehran Times posted a video generated using Veo that claimed to show destruction in Tel Aviv.

Grok, an AI chatbot developed by xAI, falsely identified the fake videos as authentic footage of the war in some cases.

Shortly after the explosions occurred at Evin Prison, a video surfaced on X and Telegram featuring the hashtag "#freeevin." The content of the posts and videos seemed to lack authenticity. According to the researchers, these videos were part of an "Israeli ruse."

FakeReporter uncovered an Iranian influence network of 3,000 Twitter accounts posing as Israelis expressing opposition to the war and blaming Benjamin Netanyahu.

In October 2025, a Citizen Lab report found that after the Israeli strikes on Evin prison, a network of 50 fake accounts on X (Twitter) purporting to be Iranian residents near the prison had posted AI-generated and/or manipulated content that called for people to storm the prison in the aftermath of the strikes as part of an anti-government uprising. Based in part on the high production value of one of the videos and the release shortly after the strikes, Citizen Lab concluded that the network was mostly likely either directly run by an Israeli government agency or through contractors with advance knowledge of the strikes. Haaretz also found that Israeli-funded networks also promoted the restoration of Reza Pahlavi to the Iranian throne during the war.

== Reactions and responses ==
Reactions to Iran-Israel war: Countries that condemned the Israeli attack. Countries that expressed concern. Countries that supported Israel.

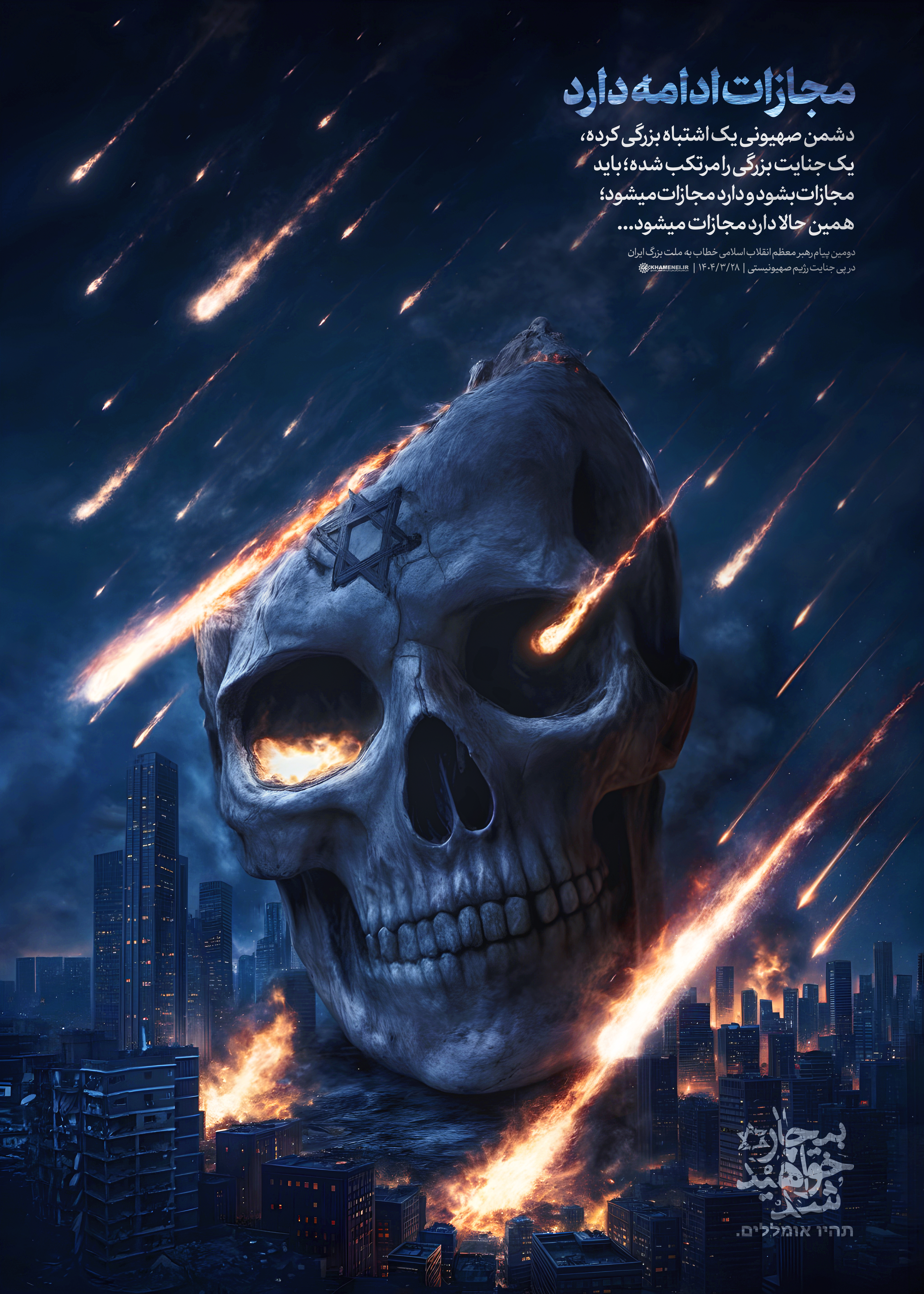
Iranian government propaganda poster, with a quote from Ali Khamenei: "The Zionist enemy has made a big mistake, has committed a great crime, it must be punished and it is being punished, it has already been punished."

In Iran, after the initial wave of Israeli strikes, various authorities warned of a retaliation to follow. There were also local support for retaliation and trepidation as to what would follow. Diasporic figures were generally continuing their support for opposition to the government. Iran also claimed that Pakistan would use its nuclear weapons against Israel, should they be used on Iran. Pakistan denied this.

In Israel, Netanyahu said that the strikes marked a pivotal moment, stating: "We are at a decisive moment in Israel's history" and said the strikes would continue until the threat from Iran was neutralized.

Defense Minister Israel Katz said, in response to Iran's initial attacks that it had crossed red lines by targeting civilians, and added that they will pay very heavy prices for that. Katz warned that "Tehran will burn" if Iran continues to fire missiles at Israel. IDF Chief of Staff Eyal Zamir stated that the Israeli Army is "mobilizing tens of thousands of soldiers and preparing across all borders," as he warned that "anyone who tries to challenge us will pay a heavy price" and that "it was at point of no return". Most Israelis supported Israeli strikes on Iran.

Israel's attacks prompted Reza Pahlavi, Maryam Rajavi and other diasporic Iranian opposition figures to call for the overthrow of the Iranian government. Some leaders of the Woman, Life, Freedom movement condemned the attacks, which they said did not help the Iranian opposition. Sepideh Qolian said that war will not bring democracy. Shirin Ebadi, Narges Mohammadi and Jafar Panahi called for an end to the war and condemned the attacks on civilians by both Israel and Iran. Mehrangiz Kar said: "People are angry, and they hate the Islamic Republic. But they now probably hate Mr. Netanyahu and his military policies even more." University of South Florida political scientist Mohsen Milani said there was little evidence in Iran of the kind of opposition which could topple the Islamic republic.

In the United States, Trump said that he told Netanyahu to continue Israel's attack, but that the United States does not want a long term war, only to not allow Iran to have a nuclear weapon. Trump praised the initial attacks and ordered support to Israel. He also threatened Iran's head of state would be an easy target for assassination. Secretary of State Marco Rubio had initially stated that Israel had "acted independently," but that was later contradicted by Trump as having known about it. The US also moved jets and the aircraft carrier USS Nimitz to the region. In June 2025, most Americans opposed a US military intervention in the war. Some of his supporters criticized Trump's support for Israeli strikes, and the possible involvement of the United States in the war. In a poll of Trump voters, 53% said the U.S. should not get involved in the Iran–Israel conflict.

Secretary of Defense Pete Hegseth and Chairman of the Joint Chiefs of Staff Dan Caine conduct a press briefing after the United States strikes on Iranian nuclear sites, 22 June 2025

G7 leaders issued a statement at the 2025 G7 summit in Canada that read: "We affirm that Israel has a right to defend itself. We reiterate our support for the security of Israel. Iran is the principal source of regional instability and terror." UK prime minister Keir Starmer convened the national emergencies committee (COBRA) and said that "Iran must never have a nuclear weapon" and also that the UK prefers a "diplomatic approach".

The White House said that Trump would decide "within two weeks" whether to join Israel's war against Iran. United States special envoy Steve Witkoff and Iranian Foreign Minister Araghchi reportedly spoke by phone several times after the start of hostilities.

In Germany, German chancellor Friedrich Merz praised Israel's strikes and stated that Israel is "doing the dirty work for us" in Iran during an interview with ZDF. Merz also said that the regime in Tehran has been weakened by Israel's attacks in the past few days and will probably not return to its former strength, making the future of the country uncertain. The Iranian government described the comments by Merz as "shameful", and summoned the German ambassador in response.

Multiple prominent international organizations, such as the United Nations, condemned the attacks on both countries and called for a restraint and Israel to de-escalate. Several countries, such as China, Japan, Russia, and Turkey, condemned the Israeli attack on Iran and called for de-escalation. Trump rejected Russian President Vladimir Putin's offer to mediate a ceasefire in the Twelve-Day War, telling him to focus on mediating a ceasefire in the Russo-Ukrainian War.

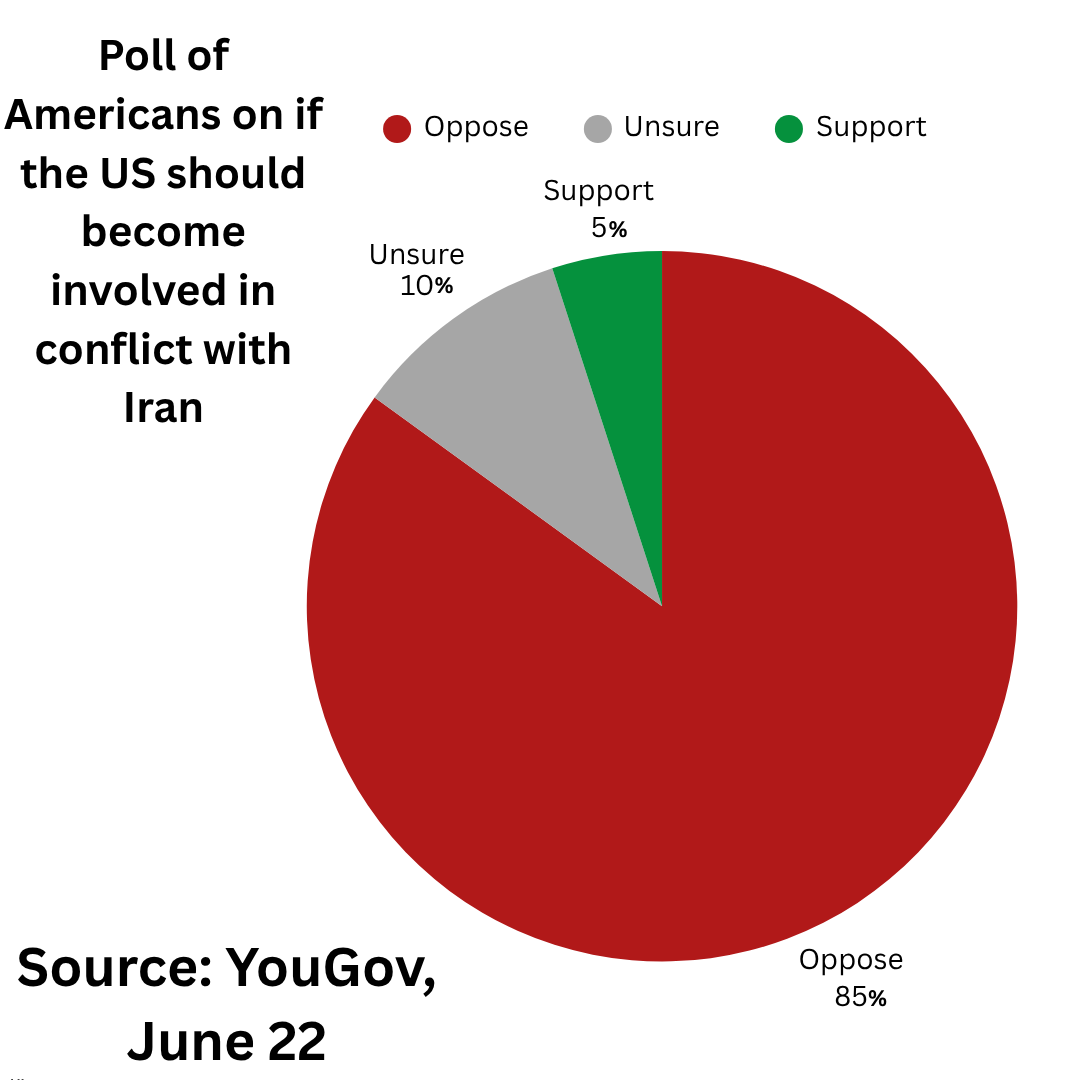
Opinion polling of Americans on US involvement in the Iran-Israel war

Opinion polling of Americans on US involvement in the war by YouGov found 85% of those surveyed were opposed to the United States going to war with Iran, while 5% supported it and 10% were unsure.

The British Foreign Secretary declared that the Islamic Republic is the greatest threat to global security. Following the US strikes on Iran, Russia and China stated that the conflict risked globalization. Former Russian president Dmitry Medvedev proposed that Pakistan and Russia could give Iran nuclear warheads in response to the war. China also stated that the US attacks would further destabilize the region.

In a televised address that day, Israeli Prime Minister Netanyahu declared a "historic victory", stating that Israel had "removed two immediate existential threats", referring to Iran's nuclear program and its ballistic missile arsenal. Reports from the Institute for the Study of War and American Enterprise Institute revealed that moderate clerics and political elites were urging a ceasefire and even considering sidelining Khamenei if he did not accept. Iranian state television and pro-government outlets highlighted widespread public relief and celebratory mood across Tehran and other cities, depicting the ceasefire as an Iranian success and a signal of regional strength. According to The Economist, Israel has achieved a level of military dominance in the region that may surpass previous high points, including the aftermath of the 1967 Six-Day War.

In a prerecorded address released on 26 June, Khamenei warned the United States against future attacks. On 27 June, Iran accused Azerbaijan of allowing Israel to use its territory for drone attacks on Iran, a claim that Azerbaijan then rejected.

Amnesty International condemned Iran's use of cluster munitions in missile attacks against Israel targeting residential areas as "a flagrant violation of international humanitarian law," with the organization's Erika Guevara Rosas stating that these are "inherently indiscriminate weapons that must never be used" and that the manner in which they were fired at Israel "demonstrated clear disregard for international humanitarian law."

=== Iranian public opinion ===
A survey conducted by GAMAAN at the end of September 2025, with over 30,000 Iranian participants, revealed their responses to the Iran-Israel war: 44% believe that the Islamic Republic is responsible for starting the war, while only 33% blame Israel. More than half (51%) think that Israel achieved its objectives, compared to only 16% who believe the Islamic Republic was successful. 42% expressed anger toward the Islamic Republic during the war. 63% believe that the war was between Israel and the Islamic Republic, not against the Iranian people. 58% responded that the Islamic Republic failed to protect the population. 58% gave a negative rating to the performance of Supreme Leader Ali Khamenei during the war. 69% think that the Islamic Republic should stop calling for the destruction of Israel. 47% agree that to prevent another war, the Islamic Republic must stop uranium enrichment, while 49% oppose Iran developing nuclear weapons.

== Analysis ==
=== Tactical ===
According to data collected by Jewish Institute for National Security of America, the interception rate of Iranian missiles declined over time. Only 8% of Iranian missiles penetrated defenses in the first week of the war. This figure rose to 16% in the second half of the war and finally to 25% on the final day of the war, before the ceasefire. "(Iran) increasingly employed more advanced systems," said Mora Deitch, head of the data analytics center at Israel's Institute for National Security Studies (INSS). "These included newer missiles with multiple warheads or decoys, which may individually cause less damage but can overwhelm and saturate air defense systems." In the final days, Iran was firing the Fattah-class missiles, and Iran has probably focused on this missile type since the end of the war, according to an analysis by BBC Persian.

=== Strategic ===
Analysts and some human rights organizations such as Amnesty International stated that Israel's military escalation against Iran risked diverting international attention and investigations from accusations of genocide related to the Gaza war. According to analyst and Iran expert Ori Goldberg, "If Netanyahu feels himself under threat [within Israel], he's going to want to crack the Iranian whip and unify people behind him."

Bamo Nouri, a lecturer in international relations, stated "Israel emerges militarily capable but politically shaken and economically strained. Iran, though damaged, stands more unified, with fewer international constraints on its nuclear ambitions."

Iranian journalist Dorsa Jabbari, writing for Al Jazeera, stated that the United States was involved in "deception" before Israel attacked Iran, with the Americans claiming that nuclear talks with Iran would continue, despite secretly knowing that Israel was planning an attack.

Analysts contend that one potential method of retaliation by Iran could have involved the closure of the Strait of Hormuz, an essential trade passage through which over 20 percent of the world's oil and a significant amount of liquefied natural gas transit each day. They assert that such a closure would impact global oil prices and lead to an increase in oil costs. Iran threatened to close the strait, but did not do so.

== See also ==
- Begin Doctrine – Israeli anti-WMD counter-proliferation doctrine
- Iran's disclosure of confidential IAEA documents
- Israel and weapons of mass destruction
- Israel–United States military relations – Bilateral security relations
- Operation Opera – Israeli attack on the Iraqi nuclear program in 1981
- Operation Outside the Box – Israeli attack on the Syrian nuclear program in 2007
- Samson Option – Israel's deterrence strategy of massive retaliation with nuclear weapons
- Timeline of the nuclear program of Iran
- United Nations Security Council Resolution 1747
