= Casualties of the Twelve-Day War =

Casualties of 2025 armed conflict

During the Twelve-Day War between Iran and Israel, by 28 June 2025, Human Rights Activists in Iran (HRANA), a US-based organization, reported that Israeli strikes killed 1,190 people and wounded over 4,000. Among the fatalities were 436 civilians, 435 military personnel, and 319 individuals whose status could not be confirmed. The Iranian health ministry also stated that more than 4,000 people have been wounded. The Times of Israel reported that Iranian strikes killed 28 Israeli civilians and one off-duty soldier, and caused 3,238 hospitalized injuries.

== Table ==
Country	Breakdown	Casualties	Date reported	Source
Iran	Total	1,060 deaths, 5,800 injuries	24 June 2025	Foundation of Martyrs and Veterans Affairs
Iran	Total	1,190 deaths, 4,475 injuries	28 June 2025	HRANA
Iran	Civilians	436 deaths, 2,071 injuries	28 June 2025	HRANA
Iran	Military	435 deaths, 256 injuries	28 June 2025	HRANA
Iran	Unknown	319 deaths, 2,148 injuries	28 June 2025	HRANA
Israel	Total	28 deaths (Note: Excludes one additional death which occurred when a woman suffered a heart attack while sheltering from incoming missiles.) (all but one were civilians), 3,238 injuries hospitalised	24 June 2025	Times of Israel
Israel	Total	3,461 injuries hospitalised, including 2 fatalities in hospital	25 June 2025	Israel Ministry of Health
Israel	Children	345 injuries hospitalised	25 June 2025	Israel Ministry of Health

== In Iran ==
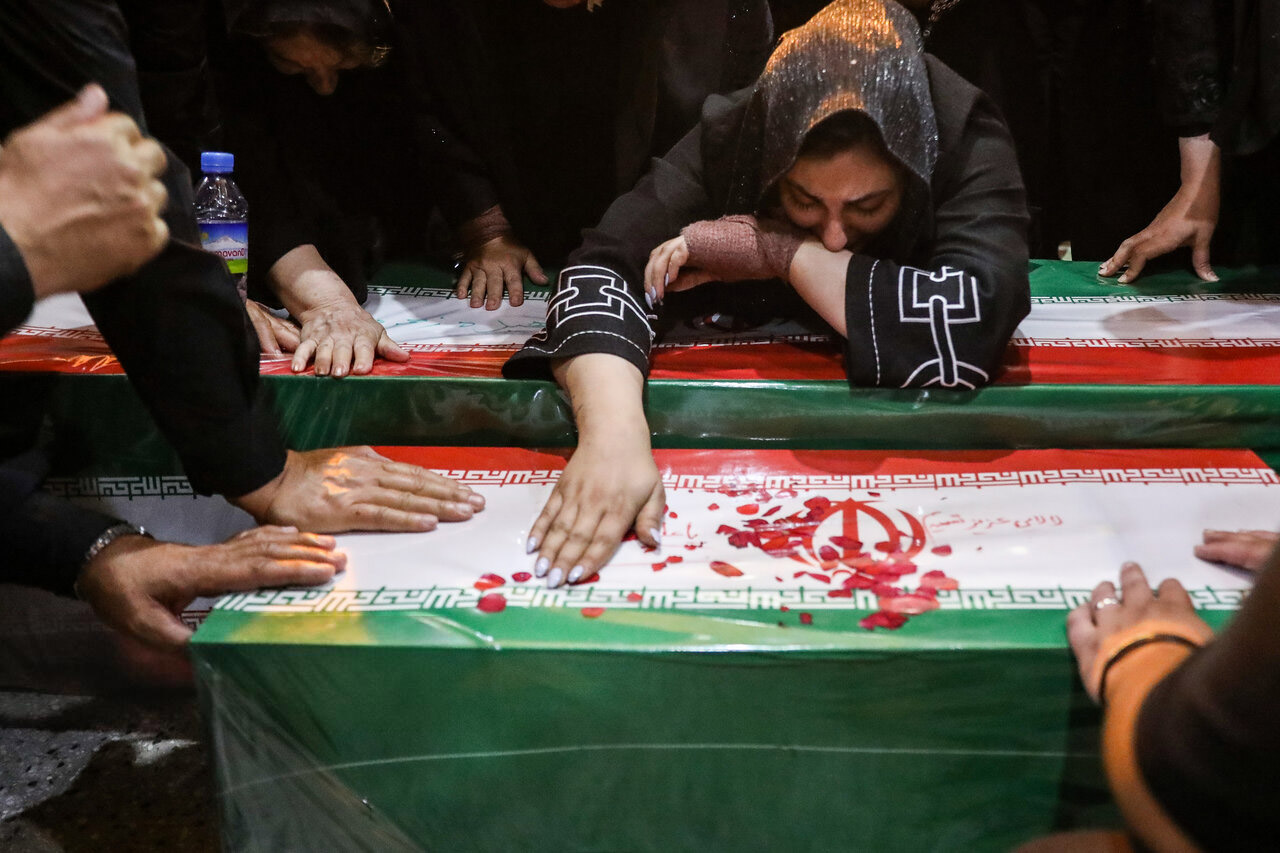
Funeral of a two-month-old victim of an Israeli strike in Behesht-e Zahra, 19 June 2025

Iranian health authorities reported 610 killed, stating initially that the majority of the early casualties were civilians. According to NBC News, the Iranian health ministry stated that more than 2,500 people have been wounded, before later increasing to 4,700. HRANA reported that, as of 28 June 2025, 1,190 had been killed, including 435 military members, 436 civilians and 319 unidentified dead. 4,475 people were injured.

Regional sources said that at least 20 senior commanders were killed in the strikes. Confirmed casualties include Iranian Armed Forces Chief of Staff, Major General Mohammad Bagheri, Islamic Revolutionary Guard Corps (IRGC) commander Hossein Salami, IRGC senior commander Gholam Ali Rashid, and IRGC commander Amir Ali Hajizadeh. The IDF said that a strike on an underground command center killed most of the Islamic Revolutionary Guard Corps Aerospace Force's leadership after they had convened for a meeting, including IRGC air force commander Amir Ali Hajizadeh as well as the leaders of the IRGC's air defense and drone units. In total, the IDF reported killing at least six senior military commanders—Bagheri, Salami, Ali Rashid, Hajizadeh, IRGC air defense unit commander Davoud Shaykhian, and IRGC drone unit commander Taher Pour. The New York Times reported the death of Quds Force commander Esmail Qaani, although Israel believes that he is still alive. According to Israeli Prime Minister Benjamin Netanyahu, IRGC intelligence chief Mohammad Kazemi and his deputy, Hassan Mohaqeq, were killed. Ali Shamkhani, a rear admiral and member of the Expediency Discernment Council, was reportedly killed in an airstrike on 13 June 2025. Shamkhani was one of the political appointees overseeing the 2025 Iran–United States negotiations. On 16 June, websites citing Iranian media reported that Shamkhani survived, but required a leg amputation and suffered organ damage. Iranian media confirmed on 20 June that he was still alive, and in stable condition after recovering from severe injuries from the strike.

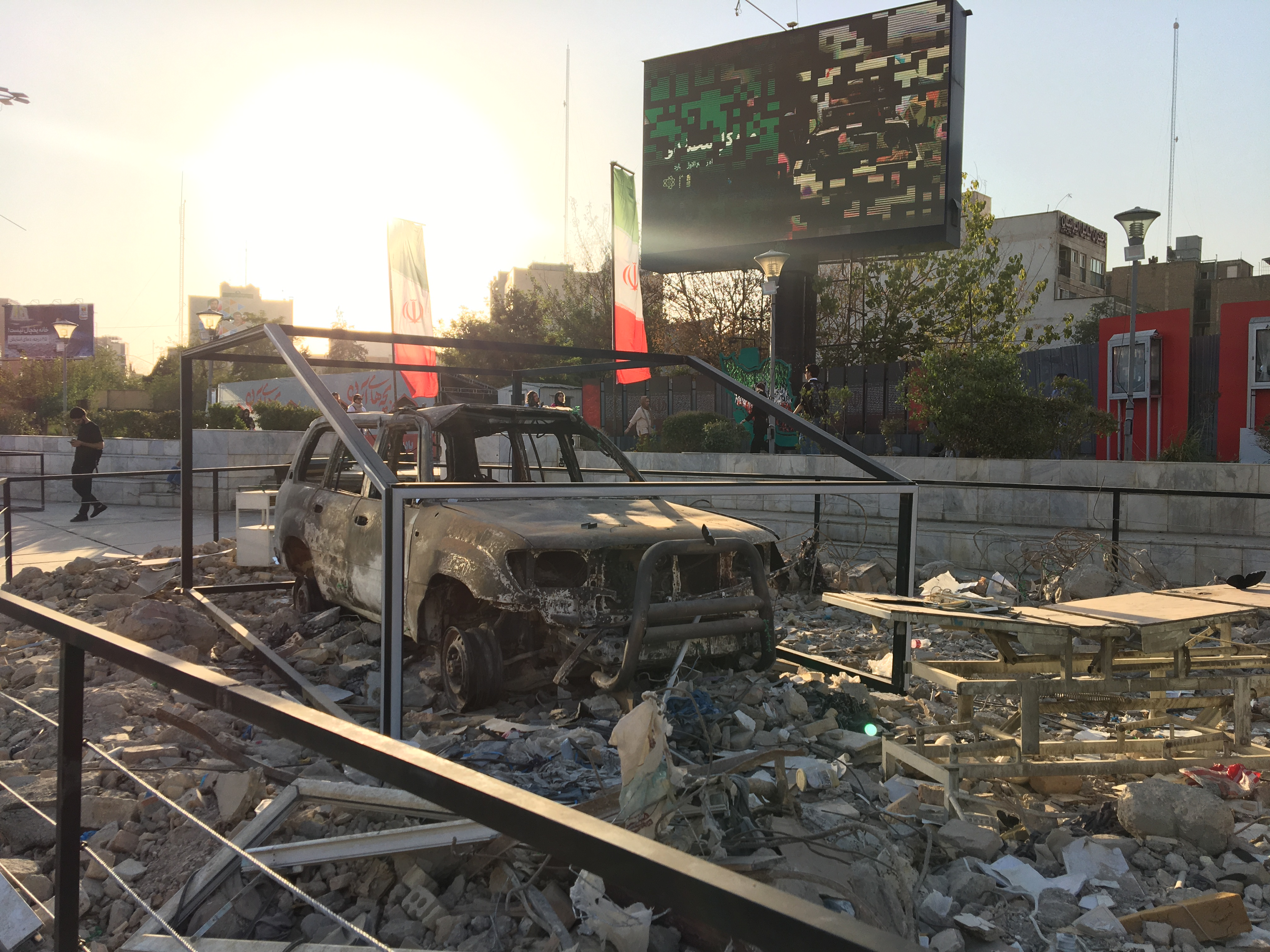
A vehicle in Tehran destroyed during the war (June 2025)

Nuclear scientists Fereydoon Abbasi and Mohammad Mehdi Tehranchi were also killed, according to Iranian state media. Tasnim News Agency later added four more scientists who were killed. Israel named nine nuclear scientists who it said were killed, including successors to Mohsen Fakhrizadeh, the chief of Iran's nuclear program who was assassinated in 2020. Two regional sources reported on 15 June that the death toll of Iranian nuclear scientists rose to 14, including some killed in car bombings.

Civilians, including women and children, were among the casualties identified. Tasnim News Agency reported that over 50 people were injured in Tehran's northern district of Tajrish, including 35 women and children who were taken to Chamran Hospital. The governor of Iran's East Azerbaijan province said 31 people were killed during the first day's strikes in the province, including 30 soldiers and one member of the Iranian Red Crescent Society. The Iranian Tennis Federation named professional padel player, Parsa Mansour being amongst the casualties. France 24 interviewed several people inside Iran who said civilians were among the victims of the Israeli attack. Iranian hospital staff reported that children were killed in the Israeli attacks.

The Iranian army claimed to have downed multiple Israeli fighter jets, allegedly killing one pilot and capturing the other. To date, no evidence has surfaced confirming these claims, while at least one video and one image purporting to show the downing of Israeli F-35's have been debunked as disinformation. The IDF has repeatedly denied claims of air force casualties or damage. Due to the absence of bomb shelters in Tehran, Iranians were instructed to shelter in underground parking lots.

Iran was reported to have executed Esmail Fekri by hanging on 16 June 2025, after he was arrested in 2023 and convicted of passing sensitive intelligence to Mossad, Israel's national intelligence agency.

=== Notable deaths ===
Name	Position	Date of death
Mohammad Bagheri	Chief of the General Staff of the Armed Forces of the Islamic Republic of Iran	13 June 2025
Hossein Salami	Commander-in-Chief of the Islamic Revolutionary Guard Corps (IRGC)	13 June 2025
Gholam Ali Rashid	Commander of the Khatam al-Anbiya Central Headquarters	13 June 2025
Amir Ali Hajizadeh	Commander-in-Chief of the IRGC Aerospace Force	13 June 2025
Khosrow Hassani	Deputy Head of the IRGC Aerospace Force	13 June 2025
Masud Shane’i	Chief-of-Staff to the Commander-in-Chief of the Islamic Revolutionary Guard Corps	13 June 2025
Davoud Sheikhian	Commander of the IRGC Air Defenses	13 June 2025
Mohammad Bagher Taherpour	Commander of the IRGC Drone Unit	13 June 2025
Mohammad Agha Jafar	Brigadier General of the IRGC	13 June 2025
Javad Jursera	Brigadier General of the IRGC	13 June 2025
Masoud Tayyeb	Brigadier General of the IRGC	13 June 2025
Mansour Safarpour	Brigadier General of the IRGC	13 June 2025
Gholamreza Mehrabi	Deputy Head of Intelligence for the Armed Forces General Staff	13 June 2025
Mehdi Rabbani	Deputy Head of Operations for the Armed Forces General Staff	13 June 2025
Mohammad Kazemi	Commander of the IRGC Intelligence Organization	15 June 2025
Hassan Mohaghegh	Deputy Head of the IRGC Intelligence Organization	15 June 2025
Ali Shadmani	Commander of the Khatam al-Anbiya Central Headquarters (replaced Gholam Ali Rashid)	17 June 2025
Saeed Izadi	Head of the "Palestine Branch" of the Quds Force	21 June 2025
Behnam Shahriyari	Senior IRGC official affiliated with Unit 190	21 June 2025
Ali Reza Lotfi	Deputy Head of IRGC Intelligence Organization	24 June 2025
Mohammad Taghi Yusefvand	Head of the Information Protection Unit within the paramilitary volunteer militia Basij	24 June 2025
Fereydoon Abbasi	Nuclear Scientist, former Member of the Parliament of Iran and former Head of the Atomic Energy Organization of Iran	13 June 2025
Saeed Borji	Nuclear scientist	13 June 2025
Ahmadreza Zolfaghari Daryani	Nuclear scientist	13 June 2025
Abdolhamid Minouchehr	Nuclear scientist	13 June 2025
Mohammad Mehdi Tehranchi	Nuclear scientist	13 June 2025
Mansour Asgari	Nuclear scientist	13 June 2025
Ali Bakouei	Nuclear scientist	13 June 2025
Amir Hossein Faqhi	Nuclear scientist	14 June 2025
Akbar Motlebizadeh	Nuclear scientist	14 June 2025
Seyyed Isar Tabatabai Qomsheh	Nuclear scientist	21 June 2025
Mohammad Reza Seddighi Saber	Nuclear scientist	21 June 2025
Neda Rafiei Parsa	Head of the Information Technology department at Tavanir, Iran's biggest electric power provider	On or before 24 June 2025
Majid Tajanjari	Artificial intelligence expert	19 June 2025
Mohammad Reza Zakerian	Artificial intelligence expert	19 June 2025

The 35 names listed in the table above represent 5.7% of the overall casualty count reported by the Ministry of Health and Medical Education or 2.9% of the overall casualty count reported by HRANA (see summary table above of all casualties).

== In Israel ==
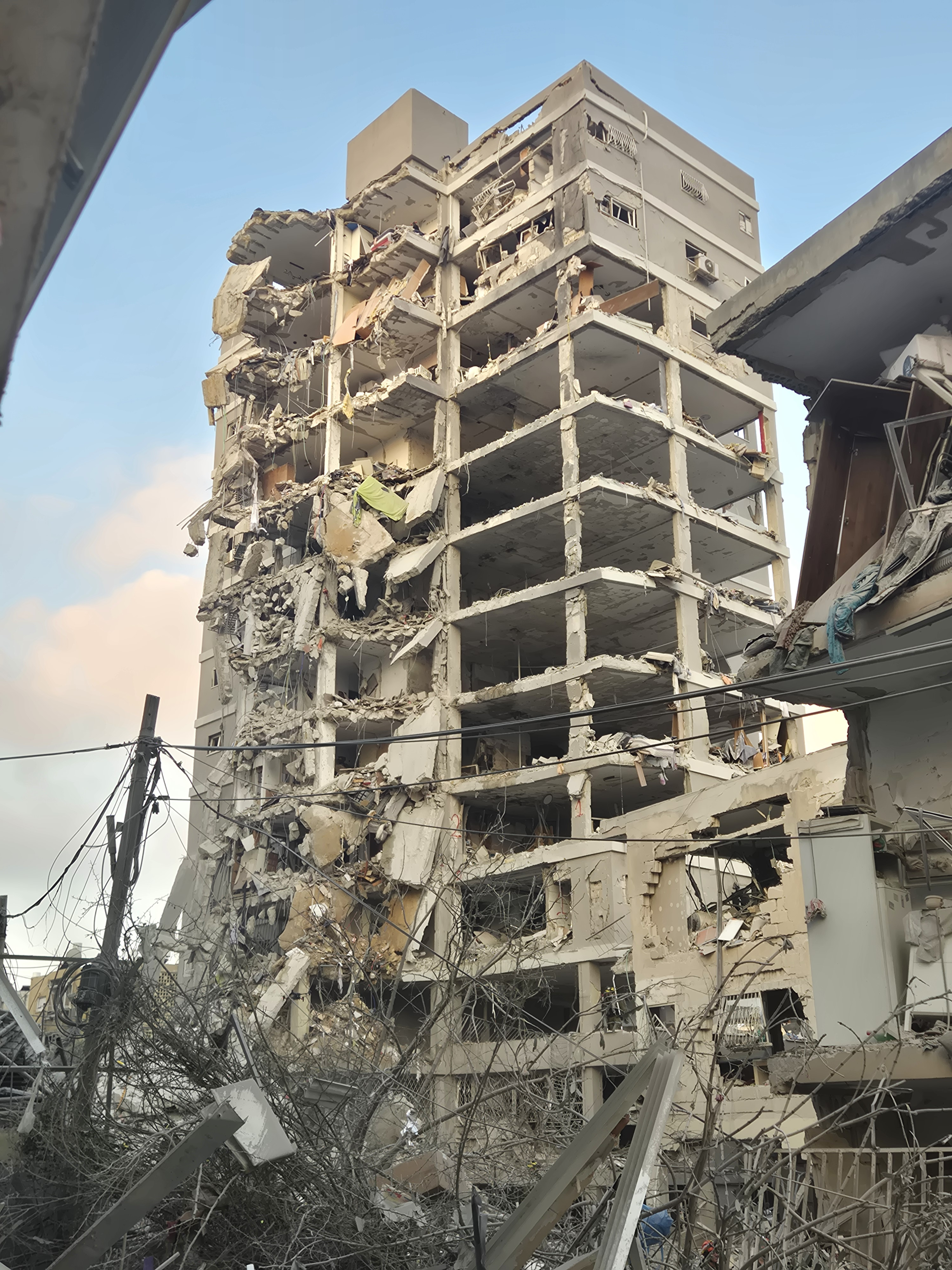
Nine people died when an Iranian missile hit this apartment building in Bat Yam on 15 June.

On 14 June, Magen David Adom reported that 63 people were injured in the Iranian ballistic missile strike – one in critical condition, another in serious condition, and eight with moderate injuries, while the rest suffered minor wounds. One fatality was confirmed. In Tel Aviv, rescue teams pulled two individuals alive from a collapsed building. Later in the day Walla News reported three Israelis were killed and 172 injured. All three were killed in central Israel, in Ramat Gan and Rishon LeZion. Three Jordanian civilians were injured.

On 14 June, local media outlets reported that five Israelis were killed across northern Israel by Iranian missiles. Later reporting, however, mentioned four deaths.

On 15 June, it was reported that nine Israeli civilians (nearly a third of all the casualties suffered by Israel during the war) were killed, and nearly 200 were wounded as a result of a missile strike in central Bat Yam. The casualties include five members of a family from Ukraine who were in Israel for cancer treatment for a 7 year old member of the family. An attack on Rehovot left 42 wounded.

On 16 June, following Iranian ballistic missile attacks on Haifa and Tel Aviv, the death toll was reported to be eight, with approximately 100 individuals injured. On the same day, CNN reported casualties in Israel of 24 people killed and 592 wounded, with 10 of them in serious condition.

Another person died on 20 June after suffering a heart attack while heading to a missile shelter. According to Israel's Ministry of Health, 2,517 people were injured as of 20 June, 2025, of which 107 were admitted due to anxiety attack.

During the ceasefire, it was reported that the death toll was at 28 killed with over 3,238 injured.

== See also ==
- Iran–Israel relations
- List of Iranian officials killed during the 2026 Iran war
