= Gholamreza Aavani =

Iranian philosopher (born 1943)

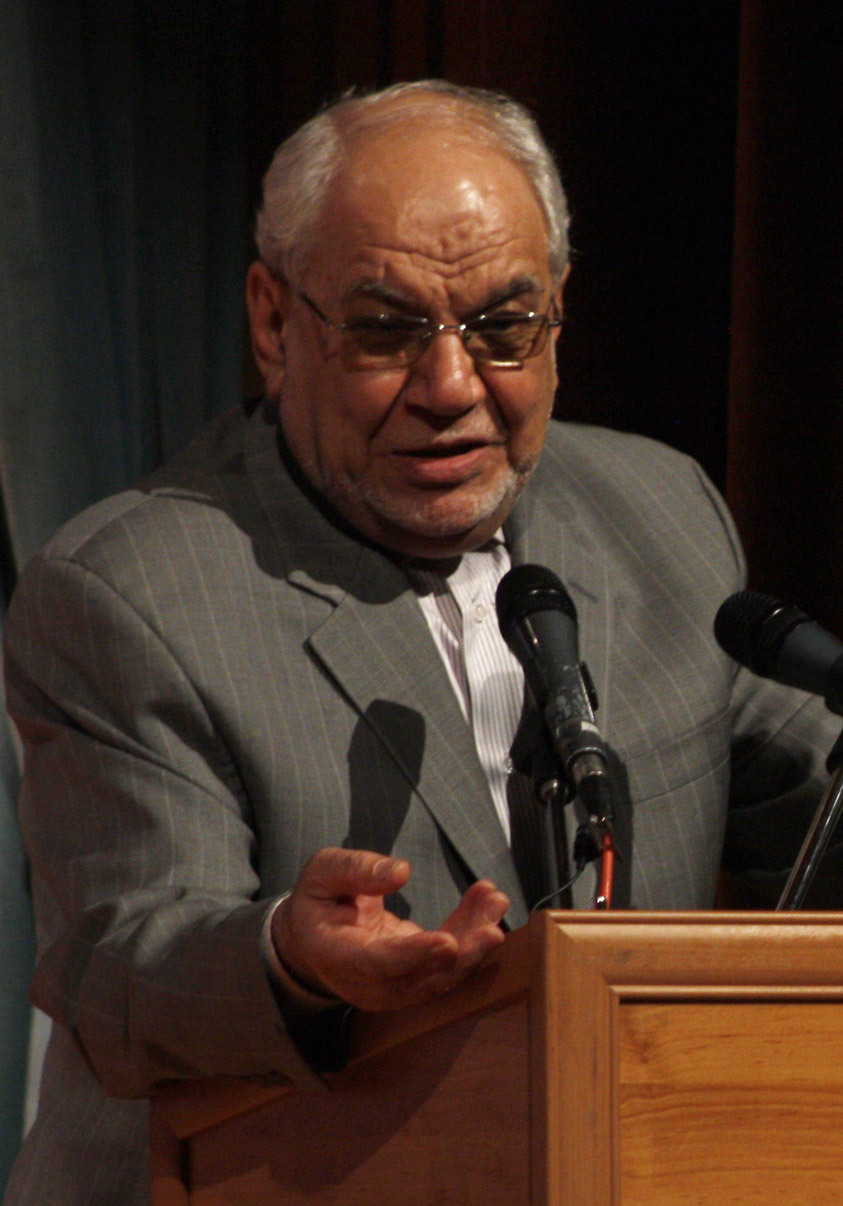
- Born: 1943 (age 82–83); Semnan, Iran

Education
- Education: American University of Beirut, University of Tehran

Philosophical work
- Era: Contemporary philosophy
- Region: Islamic philosophy
- Main interests: Islamic philosophy, Iranian Philosophy

Gholamreza Aavani (born 1943) is an Iranian philosopher and emeritus professor of philosophy at Shahid Beheshti University in Tehran. A former head of the Institute for Research in Philosophy, Aavani is a member of the Academy of Sciences of Iran and a steering committee Member of the International Federation of Philosophical Societies. He has also served as the Kenan Rifai Distinguished Professor of Islamic Studies at Beijing University, China, and is currently a research fellow at Al-Mahdi Institute.

== Biography ==
Born in 1943 in Semnan in Iran, Aavani graduated with a BA in philosophy in 1964 from the American University in Beirut. He received a master's degree in philosophy from the University of Tehran in 1968 and acquired his PhD in 1976 from the same university under the supervision of Seyyed Hossein Nasr. Aavani has the greatest influence on expediting the process of development and expansion of Iranian philosophy. He had been the head of the Institute for Research in Philosophy from the early 1980s until his removal from the office in 2011. He is also a steering committee member of the International Federation of Philosophical Societies and the first president of the International Association of Islamic Philosophy.

== Works ==
- Philosophy and Spiritual Art (in Persian, Hekmat-o Honar-e Ma’navi; Grous Publications, 1976)
- Nasir-I-Khusraw: Forty Poems From The Divan with Peter Lamborn Wilson (1998)
- Rumi: A Philosophical Study (2016)

As Editor

- Metaphysics and Science. Essays in the Memory of Youssef Aliabadi (Iranian Institute of Philosophy, 2005)

== Awards and honors ==
- Chehrehaye mandegar (Iranian Science and Culture Hall of Fame), the honor given to the influential scientific and cultural eminents (2001)
- Farabi Award for Humanities (2009)

== See also ==
- Seyyed Amir Hossein Feghhi
- Twelve-Day War
- 2024 Iran–Israel conflict
- Nuclear program of Iran
- Saeed Borji
- Saeed Izadi
- Abdolhamid Minouchehr
- Mohammad Mehdi Tehranchi
- Ahmadreza Zolfaghari Daryani
- Gholamreza Mehrabi
- Hassan Mohaghegh
- Mehdi Rabbani
- Behnam Shahriyari
- Ali Shadmani
- Hossein Salami
- Gholam Ali Rashid
- Mohammad Kazemi
- Amir Ali Hajizadeh
- Mohammad Bagheri
- Fereydoon Abbasi
- Islamic Revolutionary Guard Corps
