= Akbar Motalebizadeh =

Iranian nuclear scientist (1963–2025)

- اکبر مطلبی زاده
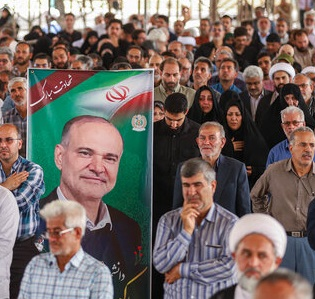
- Akbar MotalebiZadeh's funeral ceremony
- Born: 23 July 1963; Yazd, Imperial State of Iran
- Died: 13 June 2025 (aged 61); Tehran, Iran
- Cause of death: Assassination by airstrike
- Education: Nuclear engineering (energy focus)
- Alma mater: Amirkabir University of Technology
- Occupation: Nuclear engineer

Akbar Motalebizadeh (23 July 1963 – 13 June 2025) was an Iranian nuclear scientist and a faculty member of Shahid Beheshti University, also a physics instructor at Yazd branch of the Islamic Azad University. He was killed in June 2025 during the Israeli attacks on Iran.

== Early life ==
Akbar Motalebizadeh was born on July 23, 1963, in Yazd, Iran. He grew up in a religious, middle-class family and showed a strong interest in science and technology from an early age.

Dr. Motalebizadeh's father was a prominent architect in Yazd, and his mother was a homemaker. Dr. Motalebizadeh spent his childhood and adolescence in Yazd.

After the Islamic Revolution of Iranian in 1979, he became involved in scientific activities, directing his life toward serving the country in the fields of science and defense.

During the Iran–Iraq War (1980‍–‍1988), he spent two years of his youth in the trenches of war, defending his homeland. It is said that during the Iran–Iraq War, Motalebizadeh served as a comrade-in-arms alongside General Qassem Soleimani and acted as his deputy.

== Education ==
Akbar Motalebizadeh completed his undergraduate studies in chemical engineering at Zahedan University. He earned his master's degree from Shiraz University.

== Career ==
Akbar Motalebizadeh served for many years as the head of the "Shahid Karimi Group", a subsidiary of the Organization of Defensive Innovation and Research of Iran (S.P.N.D.).

== Sanction ==
The US Treasury Department sanctioned him in March 2019. According to the department, he worked in areas such as research related to weapons systems, explosives, and shock and explosion tests, and supervised the implementation of projects with military applications in the Shahid Karimi Group and served as a personal advisor to Mohsen Fakhrizadeh, then head of the Organization of Defensive Innovation and Research of Iran (S.P.N.D.).

== Death ==
Akbar Motalebizadeh was killed on June 13, 2025 during Israeli attacks on Iran at the start of the Twelve-Day War.

He was buried in Yazd on June 19, 2025.

The place of his assassination was a city called Absard in the Central District of Damavand County, Tehran province, Iran; And he was killed there along with his wife.

== See also ==
- Targeted killings by Israel
- Assassination of Iranian nuclear scientists
- Hossein Salami
- Amir Ali Hajizadeh
- Mohammad Kazemi
- Hassan Mohaghegh
- Fereydoon Abbasi
- Mohammad Mehdi Tehranchi
- Abdolhamid Minouchehr
- Ahmadreza Zolfaghari Daryani
- Amir Hossein Feghhi
- Saeed Borji
- Saeed Izadi
- Gholamreza Mehrabi
- Mehdi Rabbani
- Gholam Ali Rashid
- Ali Shadmani
- Behnam Shahriyari
- Ali Bakooyi
- Hassan Sayyad Khodaei
