= Hassan Mohaqeq =

Iranian military officer (1951–2025)

Sardar Hassan Mohaqeq
- حسن محقق
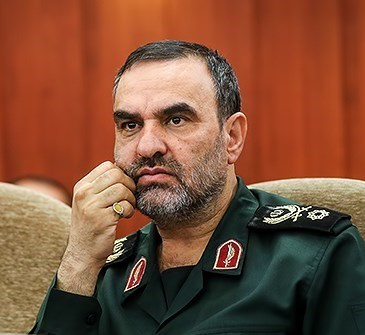
- Mohaghegh in 2019

Deputy Director of the IRGC Intelligence Organization
- In office 2016–2025
- President: Hassan Rouhani; Ebrahim Raisi; Mohammad Mokhber (acting); Masoud Pezeshkian
- Supreme Leader: Ali Khamenei
- Preceded by: Hossein Nejat
- Succeeded by: ?

Personal details
- Born: Mohammad Hassan Mohaqeq; 23 June 1963 Tehran, Iran
- Died: 15 June 2025 (aged 61) Tehran, Iran

Military service
- Allegiance: Iran
- Branch/service: IRGC
- Years of service: 1982–2025
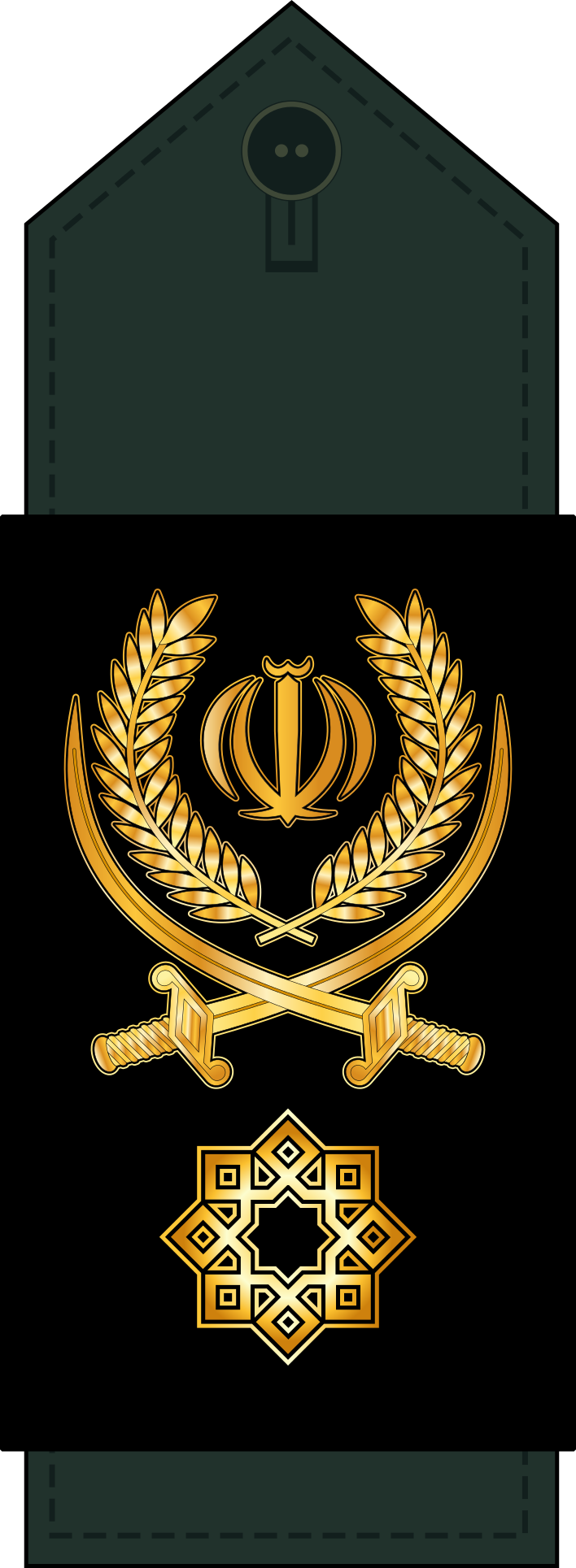
- Rank: Brigadier general
- Battles/wars: Iran–Iraq War; Syrian civil war; Iranian intervention; War in Iraq (2013–2017); Iranian intervention in Iraq; 2024 Iran–Israel conflict; Twelve-Day War X

Mohammad Hassan Mohaqeq (1951 – 15 June 2025), better known as Hassan Mohaghegh (Persian: حسن محقق), was an Iranian military officer in the Islamic Revolutionary Guard Corps (IRGC) who served as the deputy head of the IRGC's Intelligence Organization.

Mohaghegh was killed on 15 June 2025, during an Israeli airstrike in Tehran, that also killed IRGC Intelligence chief Brigadier General Mohammad Kazemi.

== Military career ==
Mohaghegh held the position of deputy head of the Intelligence Organization of the Islamic Revolutionary Guard Corps, Iran’s leading military-intelligence agency responsible for espionage, counterintelligence, and covert operations. Before that, he directed the Islamic Revolutionary Guard Corps (IRGC) Department of Strategic Intelligence. His role placed him among the top-ranking military intelligence officials. He was also a 70% veteran of the Iran–Iraq War.

== Death ==
On 15 June 2025, Israel launched an airstrike on a building in Tehran, where senior IRGC intelligence personnel were located. The strike killed both Mohammad Kazemi and Mohaghegh, along with additional high-ranking officials within the Quds Force and other IRGC intelligence departments.

The IDF officially confirmed Mohaghegh's death and noted his prior leadership of strategic intelligence operations. Iranian media, including Tasnim, as well as Xinhua, confirmed the deaths of both intelligence officials alongside other officers in the same incident. The IRGC issued statements condemning the attack, and pledging continued military action against Israel.

His funeral held on 28 June was set to take place along with those of all the top commanders killed during the Twelve-Day War.

== See also ==
- Targeted killings by Israel
- Assassination of Iranian nuclear scientists
- Hossein Salami
- Amir Ali Hajizadeh
- Mohammad Kazemi
- Ali Bakouei
- Fereydoon Abbasi
- Mohammad Mehdi Tehranchi
- Abdolhamid Minouchehr
- Ahmadreza Zolfaghari Daryani
- Akbar Motalebizadeh
- Amir Hossein Feghhi
- Saeed Borji
- Saeed Izadi
- Gholamreza Mehrabi
- Mehdi Rabbani
- Gholam Ali Rashid
- Ali Shadmani
- Behnam Shahriyari
