= Gholam Ali Rashid =

Iranian military officer (1953–2025)

Sardar Gholam Ali Rashid
- غلامعلی رشید
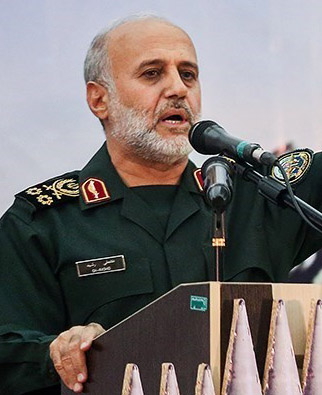
- Rashid in 2016

Commander of Khatam al-Anbiya Central Headquarters
- In office 5 July 2016 – 13 June 2025
- President: Hassan Rouhani; Ebrahim Raisi; Mohammad Mokhber (acting); Masoud Pezeshkian
- Supreme Leader: Ali Khamenei
- Preceded by: Office Established
- Succeeded by: Ali Shadmani

Deputy Chief of the General Staff of the Iranian Armed Forces
- In office 10 April 1999 – 5 July 2016
- President: Mohammad Khatami; Mahmoud Ahmadinejad; Hassan Rouhani
- Supreme Leader: Ali Khamenei
- Preceded by: Ali Sayad Shirazi
- Succeeded by: Abdolrahim Mousavi

Deputy Commander of Khatam al-Anbiya Central Headquarters
- In office ?–2016
- President: Hassan Rouhani
- Supreme Leader: Ali Khamenei
- Preceded by: Hassan Firouzabadi
- Succeeded by: Hossein Hassani Sa'di

Deputy for Defense Affairs of the Supreme National Security Council
- In office ?–2005
- President: Mohammad Khatami
- Supreme Leader: Ali Khamenei
- Preceded by: ?
- Succeeded by: ?

Deputy for Intelligence and Operations of the General Staff
- In office 1989–1999
- President: Akbar Hashemi Rafsanjani; Mohammad Khatami
- Supreme Leader: Ali Khamenei
- Preceded by: Ali Shamkhani
- Succeeded by: Behrouz Soleiman-jah

Deputy for Operations to the Commander-in-Chief of the IRGC
- In office 1986–1989
- President: Ali Khamenei
- Prime Minister: Mir-Hossein Mousavi
- Supreme Leader: Ruhollah Khomeini
- Preceded by: ?
- Succeeded by: Mohammad Ali Jafari

Deputy Commander of the IRGC Ground Forces
- In office 1985–1986
- President: Ali Khamenei
- Prime Minister: Mir-Hossein Mousavi
- Supreme Leader: Ruhollah Khomeini
- Preceded by: Office Established
- Succeeded by: Yahya Rahim Safavi

Personal details
- Born: 23 September 1953 Dezful, Pahlavi Iran
- Died: 13 June 2025 (aged 71) Tehran, Iran
- Cause of death: Assassination by airstrike

Military service
- Allegiance: Iran
- Branch/service: IRGC
- Years of service: 1980–2025
- Rank: Major General; Lieutenant General (posthumously)
- Unit: Ground Forces
- Commands: Commander of Southern Operations Headquarters (1981); Deputy Commander of the Southern Operations Headquarters (1981)
- Battles/wars: Iran–Iraq War; KDPI insurgency (1989–1996); War in Afghanistan (2001–2021); 2001 uprising in Herat; Insurgency in Sistan and Balochistan; Syrian civil war; Iranian intervention in Syria; War in Iraq (2013–2017); Iranian intervention in Iraq; Iran–PJAK conflict; Western Iran clashes; 2019–2021 Persian Gulf crisis; 2024 Iran–Israel conflict; Twelve-Day War X

Gholam Ali Rashid (Persian: غلامعلی رشید; 23 September 1953 – 13 June 2025) was an Iranian military officer in the Islamic Revolutionary Guard Corps (IRGC) who served as the commander of Khatam al-Anbiya Central Headquarters. He was assassinated by Israeli strikes on Iran on 13 June 2025.

Rashid held a master's degree in political geography from the University of Tehran and a doctorate in political geography from Tarbiat Modares University. He began his political activism against the Pahlavi regime in 1978 as a member of militant groups on the path to establishing an Islamic state and fighting the imperial regime of Pahlavi, in support of Ruhollah Khomeini to establishing "Islamic Republic". Rashid was arrested and imprisoned twice by the secret police of the Imperial State of Iran (SAVAK) before the victory of the 1979 Iranian revolution.

Rashid was one of the senior commanders of the Islamic Revolutionary Guard Corps (IRGC) during the Iran–Iraq War and participated in all major operations of the Corps. He served as the deputy chief of operations of the Islamic Revolutionary Guard Corps Joint Staff from 1986 to 1989, after which he was transferred to the General Staff of the Armed Forces of the Islamic Republic of Iran. From 1989 to 1999, he held the position of deputy chief of Intelligence and Operations of the General Staff. Rashid then served as the deputy chief of General Staff of the Armed Forces of Iran for 17 years, from 1999 to 2016. The United States Department of the Treasury placed him on its sanctions list in November 2019.

== Early life ==
Gholam Ali Rashid (full name: Gholam Ali Rashid Ali Noor) was born in 1953 in Dezful, in the Central District of Dezful County, Khuzestan province. He was born into a traditional religious family. He attended primary and secondary school in Dezful, and then went to Ahvaz to complete his public service. He did his military service in the 92nd Armored Division of Ahvaz.

Gholam Ali Rashid was born in Dezful into a large family. He is the second child in the family and has six sisters and two brothers, "Mohammad Ali" and "Hassan Ali". One of his brothers, "Hassan Ali", tragically lost his life in an accident many years ago. His father, the late "Haj Ali Rashid Ali Noor", was a blacksmith, and his mother was a homemaker.

== Educations ==
Gholam Ali Rashid had a bachelor's degree and master's degree in Political Geography from the University of Tehran, and a PhD in political geography from Tarbiat Modares University.

In addition to his military activities, Sardar Rashid was a dynamic and influential figure in the fields of knowledge and research. He completed his education at some of the most prestigious universities in Iran and earned the following degrees:

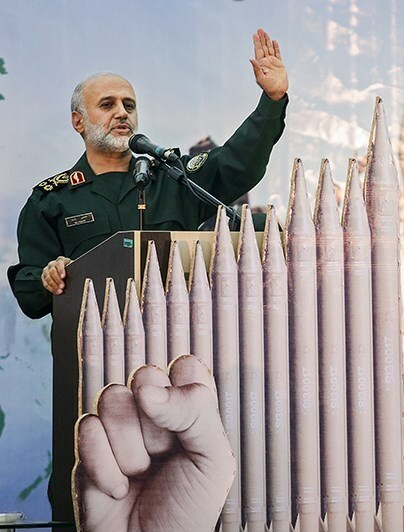
Gholamali Rashid's speech on the fourth anniversary of the death of Hassan Tehrani Moghaddam.

- Bachelor's Degree in Human Geography from the University of Tehran
- Master's Degree in Political Geography from the University of Tehran
- PhD in Political Geography from Tarbiat Modares University, 2008.

== Careers ==
=== Military ===
Rashid served as deputy chief of staff of the Islamic Republic of Iran Armed Forces, and was among the decision-making commanders in the Iran–Iraq War. Along with Mohammad Ali Ja'fari, Ali Fadavi, Qasem Soleimani, and Mohammad Bagheri, Rashid was also a member of the command network in the regular Iranian military.

He then served as the commander of Khatam al-Anbiya Central Headquarters from 2016 until his death.

==== Strategic genius ====
Among the military figures of the Islamic Republic of Iran, Gholam Ali Rashid held a distinguished position as a prominent military strategist and one of the closest associates of the commanders of the Iran–Iraq War. Rashid is regarded as one of the senior commanders of the Islamic Revolutionary Guard Corps (IRGC) and, in recent years, led the Khatam al-Anbiya Central Headquarters, the highest operational command center of Iran's Armed Forces.

He was among the first to join the IRGC following the victory of the Iranian Islamic Revolution of 1979 and quickly assumed a significant role due to his strategic genius at the onset of the Iran–Iraq War. Rashid was one of the closest associates of Hassan Bagheri, the chief architect of operations during the Iran–Iraq War. After Baqeri’s death, Rashid became one of the key figures in the war's strategic think tank.

Rashid played a significant role in major operations such as Operation Tariq al-Quds, Operation Fath ol-Mobin, Operation Beit ol-Moqaddas, Operation Dawn 8, and Operation Karbala 5. According to military commanders' testimonies, Gholam Ali Rashid’s analytical skills, strategic mindset, and deep understanding of the war’s geography made him one of the principal strategists of the Iran–Iraq war. After the war, Rashid joined the senior command structure of the Armed Forces of Iran, serving as Deputy of Operations for the General Staff and later commanding the Khatam al-Anbiya Central Headquarters, which is responsible for coordinating and focusing all military operations during crises and wars. Within the command structure, the commander of this headquarters during wartime is considered equivalent to the deputy commander-in-chief in the operational field.

Rashid was recognized as a leading theorist in the field of Iran’s military doctrine. His primary focus in various speeches was on enhancing the country’s active deterrence capabilities, and he was a staunch advocate for strengthening Iran’s missile arsenal. In recent years, Western media have portrayed Rashid as the architect of Iran’s overarching military strategies and a key influencer in regional dynamics.

In analytical reports from think tanks such as the Washington Institute for Near East Policy, Rashid is portrayed as a low-profile and quiet military figure in Iran, yet influential in military policy, with an impact far greater than what is reflected in the media. Rashid typically operated in the background, spoke infrequently, and showed little desire for visibility; however, he held a respected and trusted position among the senior commanders of the IRGC and the army of Iran.

After the assassination of Qasem Soleimani, Rashid was among those who emphasized the necessity of a strong retaliation. In one of his official speeches, he stated:

"The enemy must understand that Iran’s strategic patience is not a sign of weakness, and the response of the Islamic Republic of Iran to any aggression will be decisive and deterrent."

=== Scientific ===
Rashid was also active in research and the publication of scientific articles. He served on the editorial board of Geographic Information Quarterly (Sepehr), the editorial board of National Defense Strategic Management Studies, and was the editor of Sacred Defense Studies Quarterly. Over his 28 years of scientific activity, he published 20 articles in reputable domestic journals, primarily in the fields of geopolitics, future warfare, knowledge management, and organizational culture. His most significant scientific collaboration was with Dr. Mohammad-Reza Hafeznia, resulting in the publication of three joint articles.

The complete list of articles published by Gholam Ali Rashid is as follows:

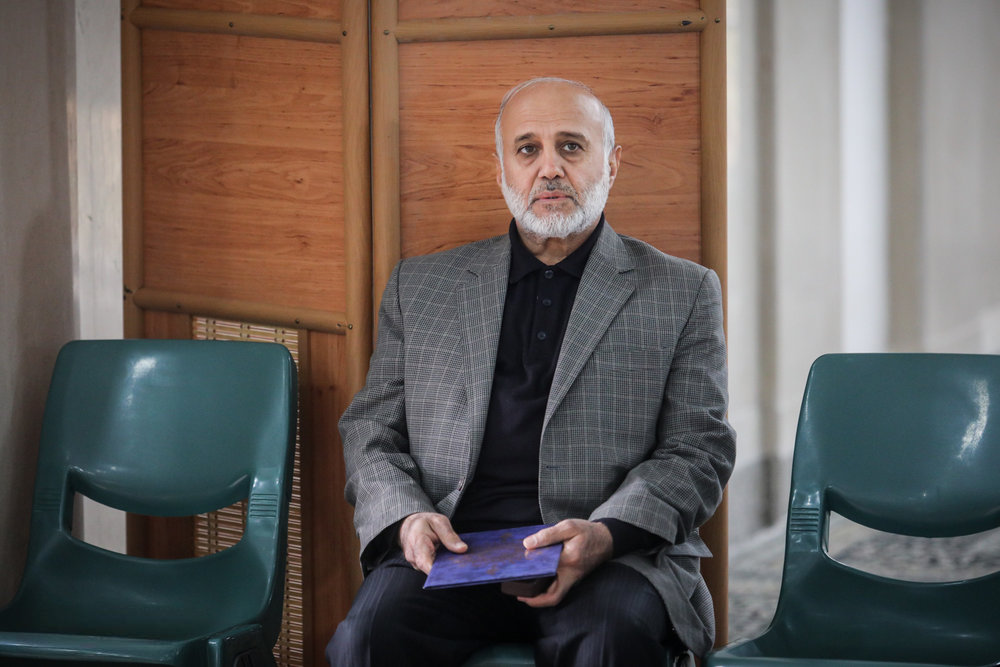
Gholam Ali Rashid, Monday evening, 29 October 2018, Mosque of the Great Prophet (PBUH), Shahid Mahallati Town, Tehran, Iran.

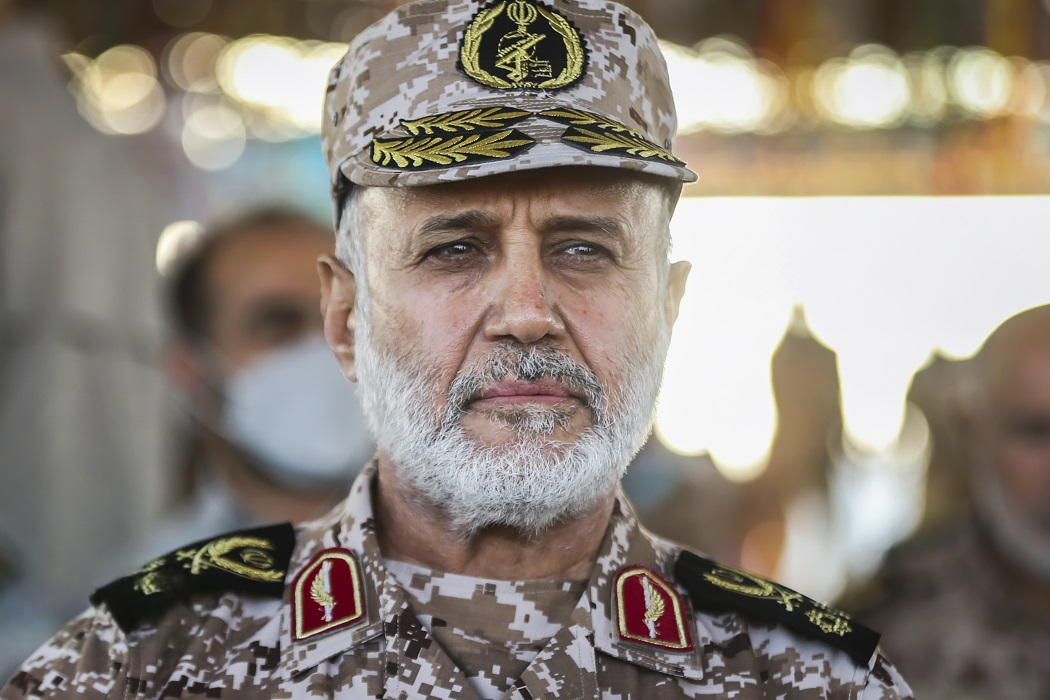
Gholam Ali Rashid in the Great Prophet XVII Military Exercise, 22 December 2021.

1. Explaining the role of Iran's coastal region in the Indian Ocean in the country's national security (published in Military Sciences and Technologies Quarterly, 2023), in collaboration with Hossein Hassani Saadi, Mohammad Reza Hafeznia, and Ebrahim Romina.

2. Theoretical Explanation of the Impact of Geographical and Geopolitical Factors of Oceanic Coastal Areas on National Security (published in Strategic Defense Studies, 2022), in collaboration with Mohammad Reza Hafeznia, Ebrahim Romina, and Hossein Hassani Saadi.

3. Explanation of the political and diplomatic lessons from the recent three-way conflicts in Southwest Asia, and strategies for transforming military victories into political achievements (published in Strategic Defense Studies, 2022), in collaboration with Alireza Taheri Moghaddam and Mohammad Davoud Saremi.

4. Factors and Characteristics of Fourth-Generation Warfare Affecting the Future War Landscape (published in Strategic Defense Studies, 2021) in collaboration with Ahmad Reza Pourdastan and Mohsen Rezaei.

5. Impact of Establishing a Naval Base on Enhancing the Naval Power of the Islamic Republic of Iran (published in the Quarterly of Marine Science Education, 2021), in collaboration with Peyman Jafari Tehrani, Habibollah Sayari, and Alireza Farshchi.

6. Designing a strategic model for establishing Iranian naval bases in the western Indian Ocean (published in Defense Strategy Quarterly, 2021), in collaboration with Peyman Jafari Tehrani, Habibollah Sayari, and Alireza Farshchi.

7. Review and Analysis of the Outset of the Imposed War of Iraq Against the Islamic Republic of Iran from the Perspective of Military-Security Surprise (published in Strategic Defense Studies, 2021), in collaboration with Kazem Eghbali, Abdolali Pourshaasb, Mohsen Rafiei, and Masoud Sameti.

8. The Regional Power of Iran and Its Impact on the Alignment of Russian Foreign Policy (published in Strategic Defense Studies, 2020), in collaboration with Ghadir Nezamipour, Abbas Alipour, and Majid Khademi.

9. Components and Characteristics of Intelligent Command and Control in the Battlefield (published in Military Sciences and Technologies Quarterly, 2020), in collaboration with Mohsen Rezaei and Ahmadreza Pourdastan.

10. Investigating the Role and Presenting an Effective Model of Knowledge Management in the Transfer of the Culture of Sacred Defense (published in Strategic Defense Studies, 2019), in collaboration with Amin Pashaei Holaasoo.

11. Explaining the Quranic teachings on jihad that influence the jihadist spirit of the Islamic Republic Armed Forces (published in Strategic Defense Studies, 2018), in collaboration with Mohammad Idrisian.

12. Developing Comprehensive Defense Strategies in the Field of Future War (published in Strategic Defense Studies, 2017), in collaboration with Davoud Zanjani, Alireza Saadat Raad, and Shahram Hassannejad Moghaddam.

13. Developing military strategies for comprehensive defense against potential future wars (published in Strategic Defense Studies, 2017), in collaboration with Kiyomars Heidari, Abolhasan Kabiri, Ali Mahdavi, and Mahmoud Saadat Arkan Najd.

14. The Role of Natural Geopolitical Factors in Formulating the Defense Strategy of the Islamic Republic of Iran Against U.S. Military Threats Originating from Iraqi Territory (published in Strategic Defense Studies, 2016), in collaboration with Fathollah Kalantari.

15. Analysis of the patterns governing future warfare and its comparison with the Eight-Year War and recent conflicts (published in Defense Strategy Quarterly, 2014), in collaboration with Gholamreza Mehrabi, Fathollah Kalantari, Shahram Shojaei, and Davud Zanjani.

16. Presentation of a model based on knowledge management to promote the culture of Sacred Defense (published in the Cultural Guard of the Islamic Revolution bi-monthly, 2012), in collaboration with Amin Pashaei Holaasoo.

17. Theoretical Model for Designing a Defense Strategy Based on Geopolitical Factors (published in Geopolitics Quarterly, 2007), in collaboration with Mohammad Reza Hafeznia, Akbar Parhizgar, and Mohammad Hossein Afshordi (Major General Mohammad Bagheri).

18. Intelligence in War: An Assessment of Past and Future Necessities (published in Defense Policy Quarterly, 1998).

19. Conditions and Necessities for the Birth, Growth, Stabilization, and Expansion of the IRGC during War (published in Defense Policy Quarterly, 1997).

20. Examining the Process of Formulating the Strategy for Liberating the Occupied Territories (published in Defense Policy Quarterly, 1996).

* Note: Most of Rashid's articles are written in Persian. Some are in English, and some others have been translated into English.

These articles cover the period from 1996 to 2023 and provide strategic defense and geopolitical analyses focusing on the Islamic Republic of Iran and the Southwest Asia region. Over 28 years, Sardar Rashid collaborated directly with eight different researchers, producing numerous articles with their participation. He was also actively involved in analyzing the role of knowledge management and the culture of Iran–Iraq War defense, jihadi Quranic teachings, and in formulating comprehensive military defense strategies for potential future conflicts.

Major General Gholam Ali Rashid is an exceptional and influential figure in Iranian defense and geopolitical studies, whose scientific contributions are as significant as his fieldwork. His dedicated and continuous efforts in producing strategic content and conducting fundamental research have established him as one of the few experts whose work serves as a key reference on future warfare, coastal strategy, and national security in West Asia. Rashid’s systematic and analytical approach to the relationship between geography and military strategy bridges academic theory and practical application, resulting in models that are both theoretical and valuable for senior defense institutions.

He has collaborated with leading figures in Iranian geographical sciences, including Dr. Mohammad Reza Hafeznia, and has actively participated on the editorial boards of the most prestigious quarterly journals.

==== Positions ====
Gholamali Rashid held a prominent scientific position in Iran and played a crucial role in training a new generation of defense scientists in strategic fields. He also significantly contributed to the development of a new generation of military commanders. His scientific positions include:

- Associate Professor of Political Geography, Supreme National Defense University
- A faculty member at Supreme National Defense University
- A faculty member at Imam Hossein University
- Member of the editorial board of the Geographical Information Quarterly (Sepehr)
- Member of the editorial board of the National Defense Strategic Management Studies Quarterly
- Editor in Chief of the Sacred Defense Studies Quarterly

==== Doctoral thesis ====
The title of Gholam Ali Rashid’s doctoral thesis was "The Role of Geopolitical Factors in Formulating Defensive Strategy." In his thesis, he examined the influence of natural geopolitical factors on the development of the Islamic Republic of Iran’s defensive strategy in response to military threats from the United States and Israel. He emphasizes that Iran’s primary adversary is the United States, which threatens Iran by leveraging the territory and geography of neighboring countries.

In his thesis, Rashid analyzes natural geopolitical factors in terms of enabling strengths, creating opportunities, generating weaknesses, and posing threats, all of which significantly influence the defensive security strategy of the Islamic Republic of Iran. He prioritizes these factors, stating that "these factors, in order of priority, are: free waters, proximity to Gulf countries, communication position, geopolitical focal points, the expanse and shape of the territory, maritime and land borders, topography, and the climate of Iraqi Kurdistan."

== Sanctions ==
In November 2019, Rashid was added to the U.S. Specially Designated Nationals (SDN) List. Under Executive Order 13876 (IRAN-EO13876), targeting individuals appointed by or acting on behalf of Iran's Supreme Leader.

In April 2024, Canada imposed sanctions in coordination with its G7 partners, including the United States and the United Kingdom, in response to Iran's regional activities and in support of calls for de-escalation. Under its Special Economic Measures Act, Canada targeted Rashid for his leadership role in the Khatam al-Anbiya Central Headquarters and his involvement in Iran's broader military operations. In addition, Rashid was said to be sanctioned for his role in orchestrating Iran's first direct missile and drone attack on Israel, carried out in coordination with Houthi forces in Yemen, Hezbollah in Lebanon, and militias in Iraq. Mélanie Joly, Canadian Minister of Foreign Affairs, said:

Today's measures deliver a clear message: Canada and its allies are prepared and will not hesitate to take action against the Iranian regime as it seeks to destabilize regional peace and security. Whether directly or through its proxies, Iran's behaviour is deeply concerning and risks further escalating regional tensions and violence. This must be avoided. Canada stands by Israel and its people and reaffirms its commitment to their security.

== Controversy ==
Rashid openly acknowledged Iran's deep strategic ties with several non-state armed groups across the region. He described Hezbollah in Lebanon, Hamas and Palestinian Islamic Jihad in Gaza, the Popular Mobilization Forces in Iraq, and the Houthis in Yemen not merely as allies but as direct extensions of Iran's military forces. He further stated that the U.S. and Israel were upset by this structure because it effectively established "six armies outside our borders that work for Iran".

== In the news ==
Rashid declared in 2011 that Iran may attack Israel military equipment and nuclear sites in a war.

In a conference in Tehran in 2014, he announced that Iranian commanders were in Iraq, Syria, Palestine, and Lebanon to give military advice.

== Death ==
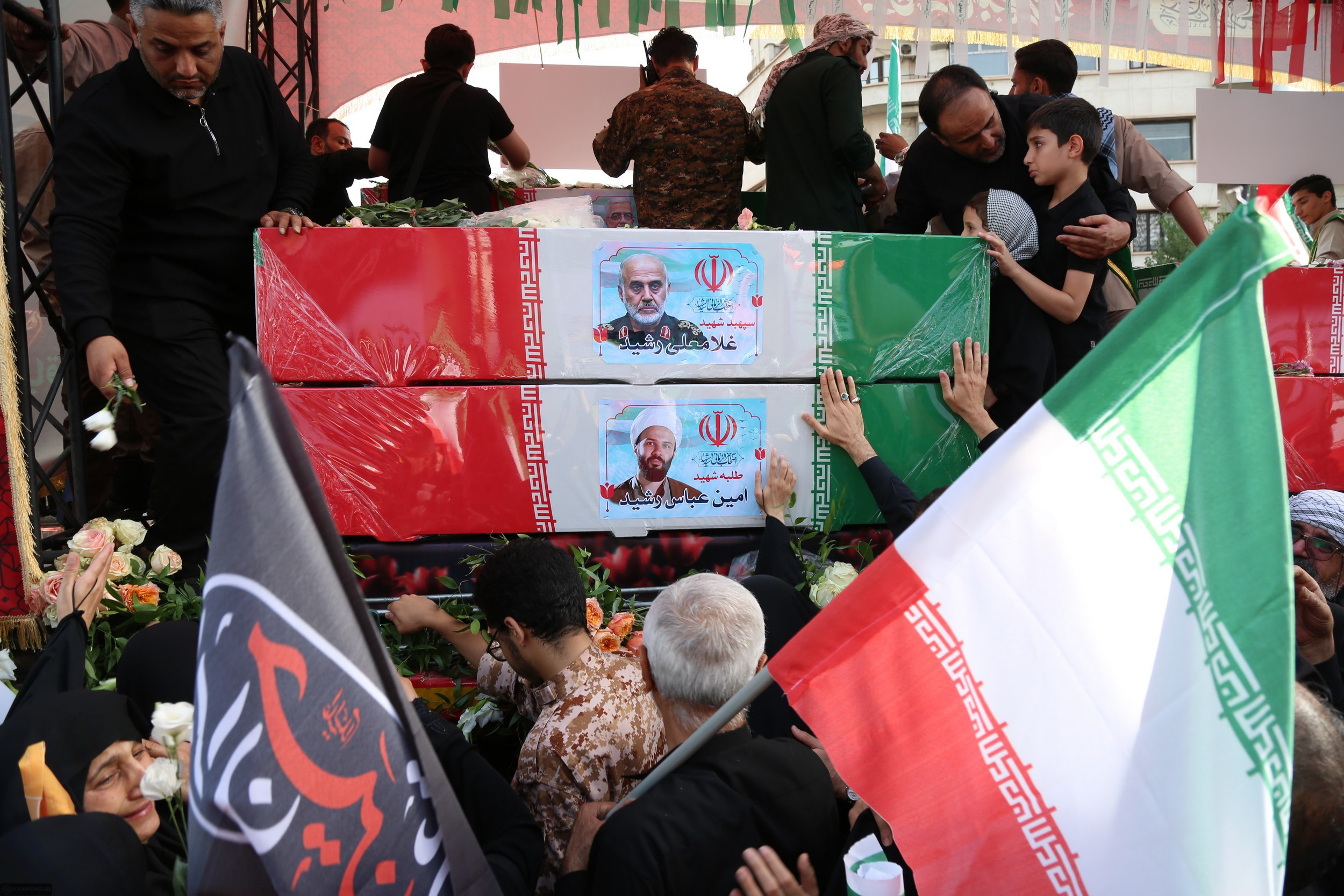
Funeral of Gholamali Rashid and his son, Amin Abbas Rashid, in Tehran, June 28, 2025.

Rashid was killed during the Twelve-Day War on 13 June 2025. His successor Ali Shadmani was killed four days later. His funeral held on 28 June was set to take place along with those of all the top commanders killed during the Twelve-Day War

== See also ==
- List of Iranian two-star generals since 1979
- List of Iranian commanders in the Iran–Iraq War
- Davoud Sheikhian
- Islamic Revolutionary Guard Corps
- IRGC Aerospace Force
- Iran–Israel proxy conflict
- Twelve-Day War
- Davoud Sheikhian
- Mohammad Bagheri
- Hossein Salami
- Amir Ali Hajizadeh
- Mohammad Kazemi
- Hassan Mohaqeq
- Fereydoon Abbasi
- Mohammad Mehdi Tehranchi
- Abdolhamid Minouchehr
- Ahmadreza Zolfaghari Daryani
- Akbar Motalebizadeh
- Seyyed Amir Hossein Feghhi
- Saeed Borji
- Saeed Izadi
- Gholamreza Mehrabi
- Mehdi Rabbani
- Ali Shadmani
- Behnam Shahriyari
- Ali Bakouei
- Targeted killing by Israel
- Assassinations of Iranian nuclear scientists

Military offices
New title	Deputy Commander of the Southern Operations Headquarters; 1981	Succeeded by Hassan Bagheri
Preceded by Yahya Rahim Safavi	Commander of the Southern Operations Headquarters; 1981	Succeeded by Mohsen Rezaee
New title	Deputy Commander of the IRGC Ground Forces; 1985–1986	Succeeded by Yahya Rahim Safavi
Preceded by ?	Deputy for Operations of the Commander-in-Chief of the Islamic Revolutionary Guard Corps; 1986–1989	Succeeded by Mohammad Ali Jafari as Deputy for Operations of the IRGC Joint Staff
Preceded by Ali Shamkhani	Deputy for Intelligence and Operations of the General Staff of the Armed Forces of the Islamic Republic of Iran; 1989–1999	Succeeded by Behrouz Soleiman-jah
Preceded by Hassan Firouzabadi	Deputy Commander of the Khatam al-Anbiya Central Headquarters ?–2016	Succeeded by Hossein Hassani Sa'di
Preceded by Ali Sayad Shirazi	Deputy Chief of the General Staff of Iranian Armed Forces; 10 April 1999–5 July 2016	Succeeded by Abdolrahim Mousavi
Preceded by Ali Khamenei	Commander of the Khatam al-Anbiya Central Headquarters; 5 July 2016–13 June 2025	Succeeded by Ali Shadmani
Government offices
Preceded by ?	Deputy for Defense Affairs of the Supreme National Security Council ?–2005	Succeeded by ?
