= Ali Shadmani =

Iranian military officer (1962–2025)

Sardar Ali Shadmani
- علی شادمانی
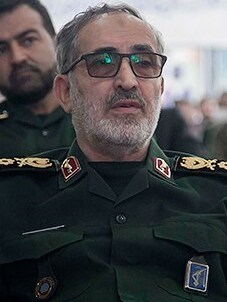
- Shadmani in 2022
- Born: September 21, 1962; Hamadan, Pahlavi Iran
- Died: June 17, 2025 (aged 62); Tehran, Iran
- Cause of death: Assassination by airstrike
- Military career
- Allegiance: Iran
- Branch: IRGC
- Service years: 1979–2025
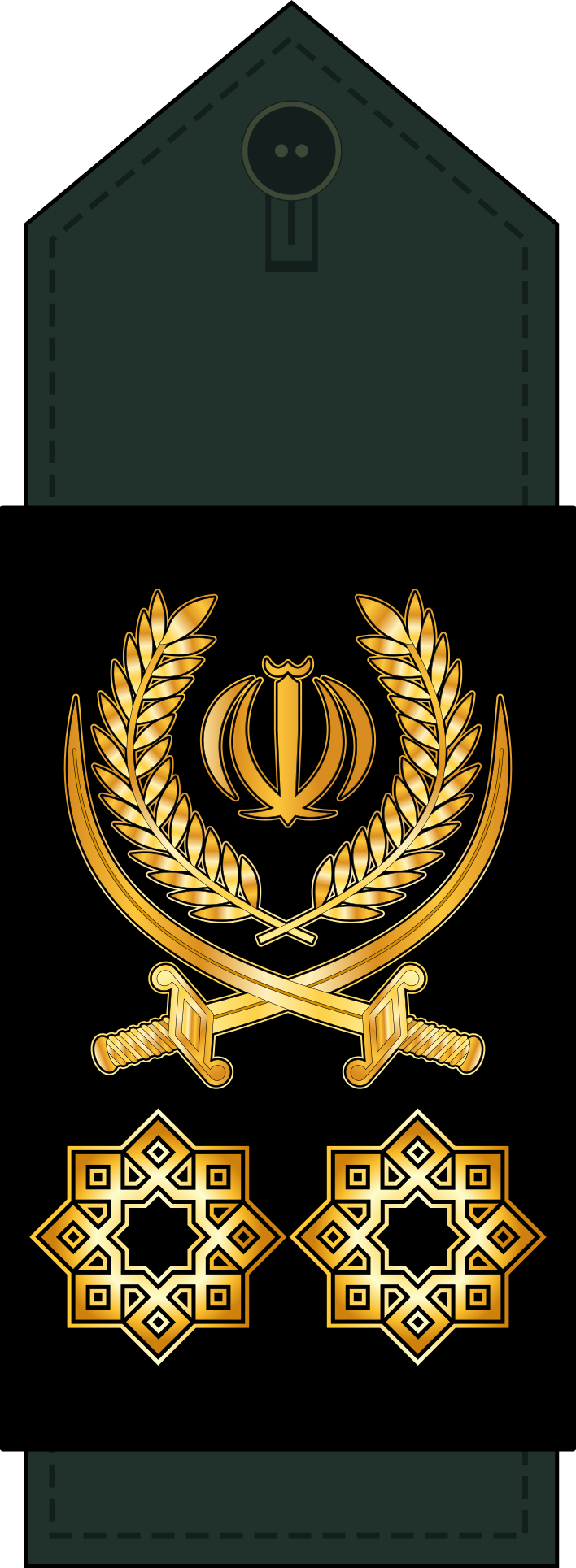
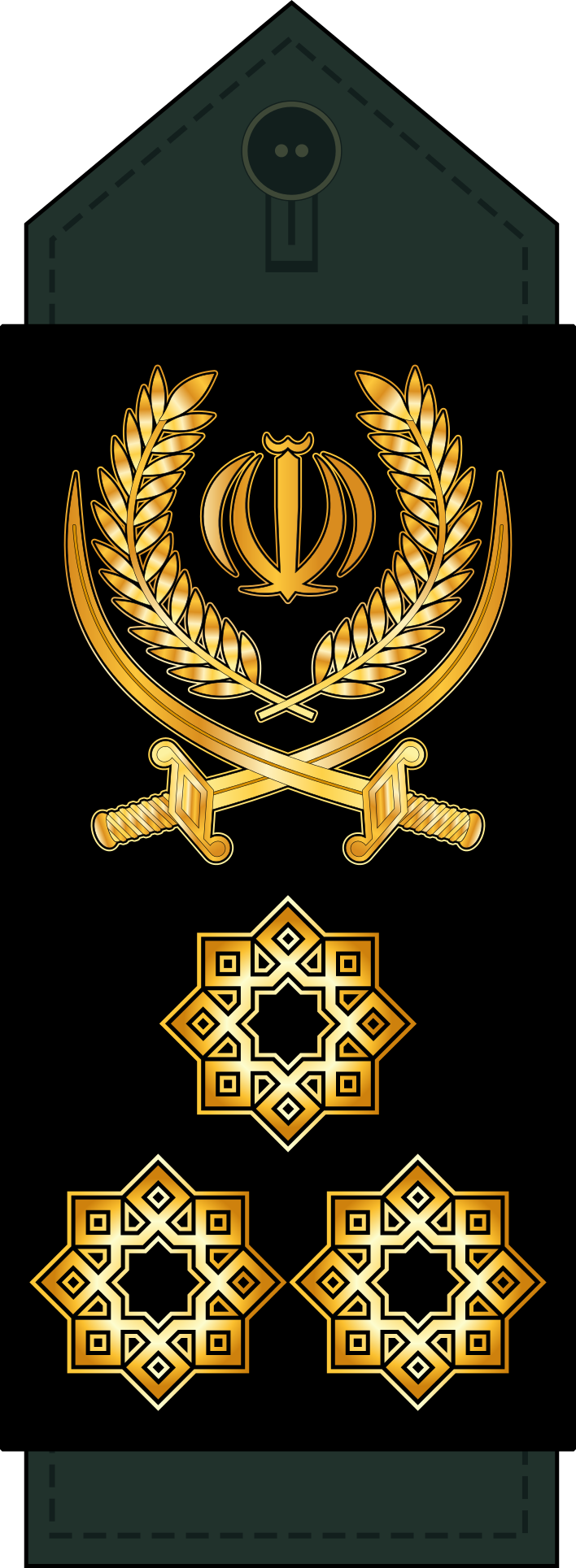
- Rank: Major General; Lieutenant General (posthumously)
- Unit: Ground Forces
- Commands: Khatam al-Anbiya Central Headquarters (2025); Coordinator Deputy of the Khatam al-Anbiya Central Headquarters (2016–2025); Deputy Chief of Operations for the Khatam al-Anbiya Central Headquarters (2016–?); Deputy Chief of Operations for the General Staff (2013–2016); Head of the Ground Operations Department of the General Staff (2005–2013); Head of Amir Al-Momenin University of Military Sciences and Technology (2003–2005); 4th Ba'ath Division (2001–2003); Najaf Ashraf Headquarters (2001–2003); 3rd Hamzeh Special Forces Division (1997–2001); Deputy Chief of Operations for IRGC Ground Forces (1989–1997); 32nd Ansar al-Hossein Division (1986–1988)
- Conflicts: Iran–Iraq War; KDPI insurgency (1989–1996); Insurgency in Sistan and Balochistan; Syrian civil war; Iranian intervention in Syria; War in Iraq (2013–2017); Iranian intervention in Iraq; Iran–PJAK conflict; Western Iran clashes; 2019–2021 Persian Gulf crisis; 2024 Iran–Israel conflict; April 2024 Iranian strikes on Israel; October 2024 Iranian strikes on Israel; Twelve-Day War X

Ali Shadmani (Persian: علی شادمانی; 21 September 1962 – 17 June 2025) was an Iranian military officer in the Islamic Revolutionary Guard Corps (IRGC).

Shadmani served as the Commander of the Khatam al-Anbiya Central Headquarters for a few days in June 2025, before he was killed in an Israeli airstrike during the Twelve-Day War which targeted senior members of Iran's military leadership, its nuclear facilities, and its nuclear scientists. Shadmani replaced Major General Gholam Ali Rashid following his death on 13 June 2025, also from an Israeli airstrike.

== Personal life ==
Ali Shadmani was born on September 21, 1962, in Heyran village, Hamedan, Iran. There is no specific information available about his early life. In the sources mentioned he joined the Islamic Revolutionary Guard Corps (IRGC) in 1979, when the Islamic Revolution in Iran had succeeded, coinciding with the establishment of the Islamic Revolutionary Guard Corps (IRGC), and began his professional activities in the field of defense and security. His entry into the IRGC marked the beginning of a path in which he quickly advanced, and with the onset of the Iran–Iraq War, he took on significant operational responsibilities. His field activities and leadership on the front lines in the western and southern parts of Iran, positioned him among the experienced and effective commanders of the Iran–Iraq War.

After the end of the Iran–Iraq War, Shadmani held significant positions within the Islamic Revolutionary Guard Corps and the General Staff of the Armed Forces of the Islamic Republic of Iran. Before his assassination by Mossad, he served as the Deputy Coordinator of the Khatam al-Anbiya Central Headquarters. He possessed a thorough understanding of the operational structure and the special role of this headquarters in coordinating efforts among the Islamic Republic of Iran Army, the Islamic Revolutionary Guard Corps, the Ministry of Defence and Armed Forces Logistics of Iran, and other Iranian security agencies.

During the June 2025 Israel's attack on Tehran and the assassination of Gholam Ali Rashid, the Iranian leader issued a decree appointing General Shadmani as the commander of the Khatam al-Anbiya Central Headquarters.

However, just a few days after this appointment and following the same Israeli attacks on Iran, General Ali Shadmani was also assassinated. His assassination was confirmed by official sources, including Fars News Agency. Over more than four decades of service, General Shadmani was known as one of the most reliable figures in the Islamic Revolutionary Guard Corps in both operational and strategic roles. His assassination is considered a significant loss to the Iran's military command structure.

Shadmani was married to Maleehe Faraji, and they had five children. Among them, "Yaser Shadmani" and "Saber Shadmani" are the best known.

== Career ==
Born in Hamadan, Shadmani was a veteran of the Iran–Iraq War. He held several senior positions within the Iranian Islamic Revolutionary Guard Corps (IRGC). He served as the Deputy Coordinator of the Khatam al-Anbiya Central Headquarters, where he oversaw operational planning and joint-force integration. The Khatam al-Anbiya Central HQ is tasked with managing Iran's defense posture and coordinating between the branches of the regular army (the Islamic Republic of Iran Army; Artesh) and the IRGC during national emergencies and wartime scenarios.

From 2013 to 2016, he was the Deputy of Operations of the General Staff of the Armed Forces. Following the assassination of Hamas political leader Ismail Haniyeh in July 2024, Shadmani vowed that Iran would deliver "severe revenge" against Israel. He accused the "Zionist criminal regime" of crossing red lines and predicted a decisive retaliation. He had also been deputy commander of the Emergency Command and head of the Operations Department of the General Staff of the Armed Forces of Iran.

In January 2025, he derided what he characterized as deceptive propaganda of Iran's enemies describing Iran's military as feeble, saying: "Our adversaries, particularly the Americans and Zionists, seek to fabricate narratives to mask their own shortcomings; they strive to depict Iran as weak, which is far from reality. Our armed forces are in peak readiness,"

On 13 June 2025, following Israeli airstrikes that killed multiple top Iranian military commanders, including Major General Gholam Ali Rashid, who had led the headquarters since 2016, supreme leader Ali Khamenei appointed Shadmani as the new commander of the Khatam al-Anbiya Central Headquarters. This transition occurred amid an escalating military conflict between Iran and Israel. Shadmani stated that Iran's armed forces would continue their operations on a significantly broader and more destructive scale, until what he described as the "criminal and aggressor Zionist enemy" fully repents and regrets its actions.

=== Military background ===
Since the beginning of his military career, Shadmani has held the following positions:

- Commander of the 32nd Corps of Ansar al-Hussein during the Iran–Iraq War (From 1986 to 1988)
- Deputy of Operations for the Ground Forces of the IRGC (from 1989 to 1997)
- Commander of the 3rd Special Forces Division of Hamzeh Seyyed ol-Shohada (from 1997 to 2001)
- Commander of the Najaf Ashraf Headquarters (from 2001 to 2003)
- Head of the Operations Department of the General Staff of the Armed Forces of the Islamic Republic of Iran (from 2005 to 2013)
- Deputy of Operations for the General Staff of the Armed Forces of the Islamic Republic of Iran (from 2013 to 2016)
- Deputy Coordinator of the Khatam al-Anbiya Central Headquarters (2016–2025)
- Commander of the Khatam al-Anbiya Central Headquarters (June 13, 2025 to June 25, 2025)

== Sanctions ==
In October 2024, Shadmani was sanctioned by the European Union, while he was serving as Deputy Coordinator of Iran's IRGC Khatam al-Anbiya Central Headquarters (KCHQ), following Iran's transfer of missiles and drones to Russia. Shadmani faced asset freezes, a travel ban, and a prohibition on the provision of any financial or economic resources from European Union entities.

== Death ==
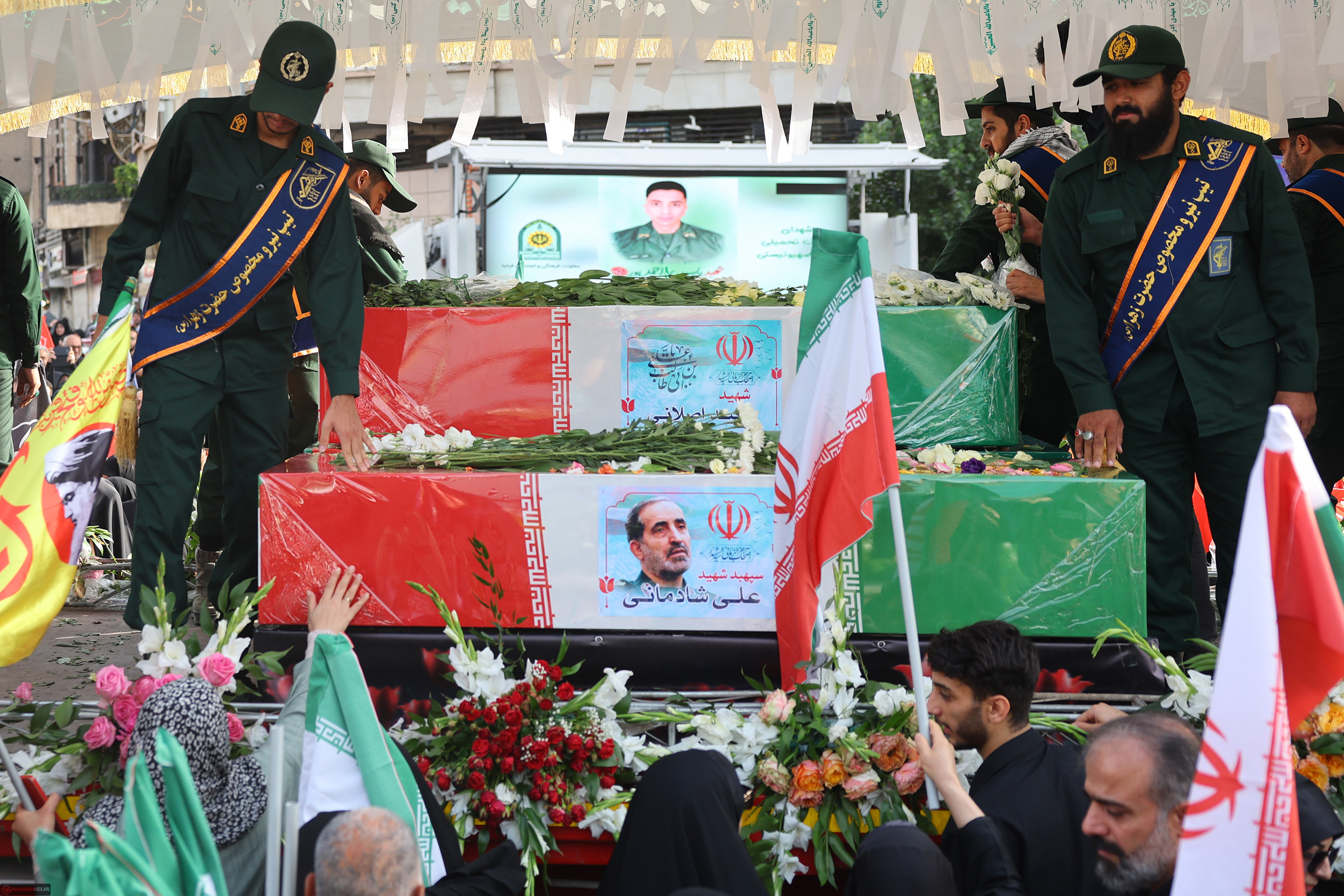
Funeral of Lieutenant General Ali Shadmani in Tehran (June 28, 2025)

On 17 June 2025, the Israel Defense Forces reported that Shadmani had been killed in an Israeli airstrike targeting a mountain command facility in central Tehran. The strike occurred just four days after Shadmani had been appointed to replace Gholam Ali Rashid, who himself had also been killed in an Israeli airstrike, on 13 June 2025. His funeral held on 28 June was set to take place along with those of all the top commanders killed during the Twelve-Day War.

Shadmani's daughter stated that, contrary to most reports, Shadmani was targeted and assassinated on the ground.

In June 2026, Najat, deputy commander of Iran’s Tharallah Security Headquarters, said Shadmani had been identified while being transferred between military facilities and was killed when the facility where he was located was struck by an air-launched missile.

Following his death, he was posthumously promoted to the rank of lieutenant general (sepahbod) by order of Supreme Leader Ali Khamenei. The decree was formally delivered to his family by Ali Abdollahi, commander of the Khatam al-Anbiya Central Headquarters.

== See also ==
- List of Iranian two-star generals since 1979
- Iranian leaders of the Iran–Iraq War
- Davoud Sheikhian
- Islamic Revolutionary Guard Corps
- IRGC Aerospace Force
- Iran–Israel proxy conflict
- Twelve-Day War
- Davoud Sheikhian
- Mohammad Bagheri
- Hossein Salami
- Amir Ali Hajizadeh
- Mohammad Kazemi
- Hassan Mohaqeq
- Fereydoon Abbasi
- Mohammad Mehdi Tehranchi
- Abdolhamid Minouchehr
- Ahmadreza Zolfaghari Daryani
- Akbar Motalebizadeh
- Seyyed Amir Hossein Feghhi
- Saeed Borji
- Saeed Izadi
- Gholamreza Mehrabi
- Mehdi Rabbani
- Gholam Ali Rashid
- Behnam Shahriyari
- Ali Bakouei
- Targeted killing by Israel
- Assassinations of Iranian nuclear scientists

Military offices
Preceded by Mehdi Kiani	Commander of the 32nd Ansar al-Hossein Division; 1986–1988	Succeeded by ?
Preceded by Ahmad Kazemi	Deputy Operations Commander of the IRGC Ground Forces; 1989–1997	Succeeded by ?
Preceded by ?	Commander of the 3rd Hamzeh Special Forces Division; 1997–2001	Succeeded by Mansour Ezzati
Preceded by Mehdi Rabbani	Commander of the 4th Ba'ath Division; 2001–2003	Succeeded by Mohammad Nazar Azimi
Preceded by Mehdi Rabbani	Commander of Najaf Ashraf Headquarters; 2001–2003	Succeeded by Mohammad Nazar Azimi
Preceded by ?	head of the Amir Al-Momenin University of Military Sciences and Technology; 2003–2005	Succeeded by Aghaei
Preceded by ?	Head of Ground Operations of the General Staff of the Armed Forces; 2005–2013	Succeeded by ?
Preceded by Mostafa Salami	Deputy Operations Commander of the General Staff of the Armed Forces; 2013–2016	Succeeded by Mehdi Rabbani
Preceded by ?	Deputy Operations Commander of Khatam al-Anbiya Central Headquarters; 2016–?	Succeeded by Parviz Hashemi
Preceded by Mohammad Bagheri	Coordinating Deputy of Khatam al-Anbiya Central Headquarters; 28 June 2016–13 June 2025	Succeeded by ?
Preceded by Gholam Ali Rashid	Commander of Khatam al-Anbiya Central Headquarters; 13 June 2025–17 June 2025	Succeeded by Ali Abdollahi
