= Amir Ali Hajizadeh =

Iranian military officer (1962–2025)

Sardar Amir Ali Hajizadeh
- امیرعلی حاجی‌زاده
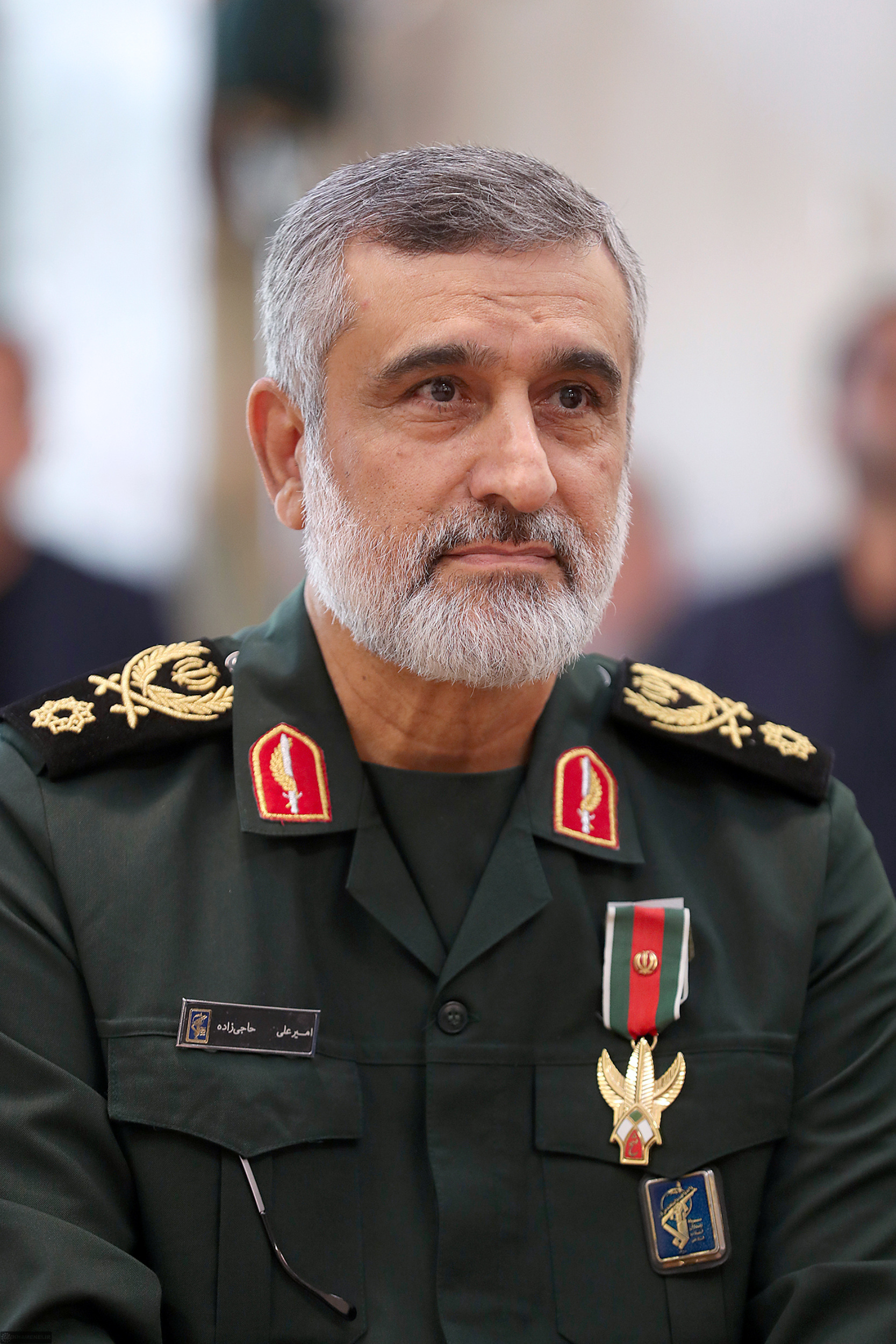
- Hajizadeh in 2024

Commander of Islamic Revolutionary Guard Corps Aerospace Force
- In office 4 October 2009 – 13 June 2025
- President: Mahmoud Ahmadinejad; Hassan Rouhani; Ebrahim Raisi; Mohammad Mokhber (acting); Masoud Pezeshkian
- Supreme Leader: Ali Khamenei
- Preceded by: Hossein Salami
- Succeeded by: Majid Mousavi

Commander of Artillery, Missiles, and Air Defense of the IRGC Ground Forces
- In office 2005–2009
- President: Mahmoud Ahmadinejad
- Supreme Leader: Ali Khamenei
- Preceded by: Ghulamreza Yazdani
- Succeeded by: Office Abolished (Merged into IRGC Air Force)

Personal details
- Born: 28 February 1962 Tehran, Pahlavi Iran
- Died: 13 June 2025 (aged 63) Tehran, Iran
- Cause of death: Assassination by airstrike
- Awards: Order of Fath (1st class)

Military service
- Allegiance: Iran
- Branch/service: IRGC
- Years of service: 1981–2025
- Rank: Brigadier General; Major General (posthumously)
- Unit: Aerospace Force
- Battles/wars: Iran–Iraq War; Syrian civil war; Iranian intervention in the Syria; Operation Night of Power; Operation Strike of Muharram; War in Iraq (2013–2017); Iranian intervention in Iraq; Iran–PJAK conflict; Western Iran clashes; 2018 Koy Sanjaq missile strike; 2019–2021 Persian Gulf crisis; Shoot-down of an American drone; Operation Martyr Soleimani; 2024 Iran–Israel conflict; April 2024 Iranian strikes on Israel; October 2024 Iranian strikes on Israel; Twelve-Day War X

Amir Ali Hajizadeh (Persian: امیرعلی حاجی‌زاده; 28 February 1962 – 13 June 2025) was an Iranian military officer who served as the commander of the IRGC Aerospace Forces, a position he held from October 2009 until his assassination in June 2025 by an Israeli airstrike.

== Early life ==
Hajizadeh was born in Tehran on 28 February 1962.

Hajizadeh was born on 28 February 1962 in Tehran to a family originally from Karaj.

He joined Islamic Revolutionary Guard Corps (IRGC) in 1980; served as a sniper in key Iran–Iraq War operations, including Karbala 4, Karbala 5, and Valfajr 8.

== Career ==
During Eghtedar-e Velayat war games, on 8 March 2016, Hajizadeh said: "the reason we designed our missiles with a range of 2,000 km is to be able to hit our enemies from a safe distance."

Hajizadeh was also one of the main figures in Iran who led and executed the April 2024 Iranian strikes on Israel, known in Iran as Operation True Promise and October 2024 Iranian strikes on Israel, known in Iran as Operation True Promise 2. On 1 July 2024, he stated: "We are hopeful of the arrival of the opportunity for [conducting] Operation True Promise 2..." and spoke of his wish to have another chance to launch a large-scale attack on Israel.

He had also spoken openly about Iran arming its allies in the region, saying, for example: "As it is obvious from the weapons of our dear ones in Palestine, Lebanon and elsewhere, it has now become clear that they are in fact being helped and supplied by Iran". During a speech before students which aired on IRINN TV on 1 December 2023, Hajizadeh remarked: "Look, some people ask what the Islamic Republic has done with regard to Gaza. The Islamic Republic has done what it had to do. Until not so long ago their only means of defense was stones. Today they are defending themselves with rockets and they have advanced weapons and capabilities". He was awarded the Order of Fath in 2024.

=== Role in Missile Development ===
Hajizadeh was transferred to the IRGC Aerospace Division, where he was mentored by Hassan Tehrani Moghaddam, known as the "Father of Iran's Missile Program". Hajizadeh organized the first missile unit, "Hadid". He was promoted by Iran's Supreme Leader, Ali Khamenei, to the position of the commander of IRGC Aerospace Force of Iran. He oversaw of the ballistic missiles and unmanned aerial vehicles (UAVs).

=== Major Operations & Military Exercises ===
Hajizadeh directed missile strikes in retaliation for the assassination of Qasem Soleimani, as well as drone attacks against Israel and the United States.

Hajizadeh commanded missile strikes against ISIS in Syria during Operation "Night of Power" and led large-scale naval-air exercises, such as "Great Prophet IX", in 2015.

== U.S. and Canada sanctions ==
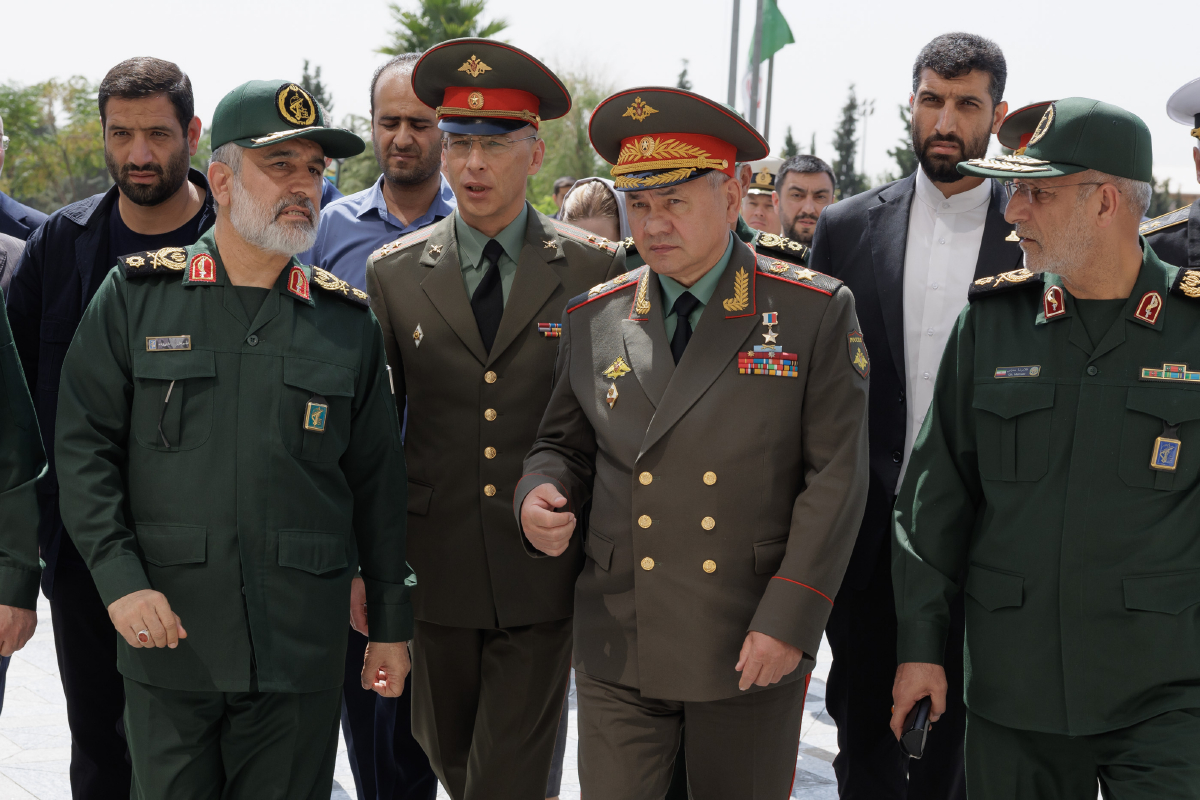
Hajizadeh with Russian Defense Minister Sergei Shoigu on 20 September 2023

On 24 June 2019, the U.S. Treasury Department sanctioned him, freezing any of his U.S. assets and banning U.S. persons from doing business with him.

On 29 September 2022, following the protests to the death of Mahsa Amini, Canada added Amir Ali Hajizadeh's name to the Consolidated Canadian Autonomous Sanctions List. On November 2023, Hajizadeh was sanctioned by the European Union for facilitating the transfer of UAVs, such as the Shahed 136 and Mohajer 6 to Russian forces for their use in the war against Ukraine.

== The downing of Ukraine International Airlines Flight 752 ==
Hajizadeh was the commander of Aerospace Force of IRGC on 8 January 2020 when two surface-to-air missiles shot down Boeing 737–800 Ukraine International Airlines Flight 752 soon after it took off while still in Iranian airspace, killing all 176 passengers and crew. The Islamic Republic of Iran denied that its missiles brought down the plane for three days, claiming it was a plane crash. As the evidence and international pressures escalated, IRGC issued a letter on 11 January 2020 and finally Hajizadeh accepted "full responsibility". Despite this letter, no-one from IRGC, including Hajizadeh, were demoted or punished.

About three years later, in November 2022, Hajizadeh blamed others for the late acceptance of responsibility: "The decision was made after 48 hours. We knew what happened from the first hour, but other entities and organizations did not accept it." He also added, "48 hours is not too long (to determine the truth)".

Hajizadeh played a key role in the downing of Flight 752 in January 2020. He accepted responsibility, describing it as “human error,” and was later acquitted by a military court.

== Threat to kill Donald Trump and Mike Pompeo ==
In February 2023, Hajizadeh claimed Iran had developed a cruise missile with a range of 1,650 kilometres (1,030 mi) and threatened to kill former US President Donald Trump and former US Secretary of State Mike Pompeo. "God willing, we are looking to kill Trump, Pompeo ...and military commanders who issued the order (to kill Quds Force commander Qasem Soleimani)," Hajizadeh said in the television interview.

== Iranian strikes on Israel ==
Hajizadeh oversaw aerial attacks by Iranian forces against Israel in April and October 2024. On 6 October, Supreme Leader Ayatollah Ali Khamenei awarded Hajizadeh the Order of Fath in recognition of his role.

== Death ==
Hajizadeh was killed on 13 June 2025 in an Israeli airstrike targeting an underground military command center in Iran. Following the attack, the Islamic Revolutionary Guard Corps (IRGC) stated that Hajizadeh had played an important role in strengthening Iran’s deterrence capabilities and safeguarding the country’s security and independence. The IRGC also warned that Israel and its regional and extra-regional supporters would receive a “proportionate and decisive response” at an appropriate time and place.

== Gallery ==
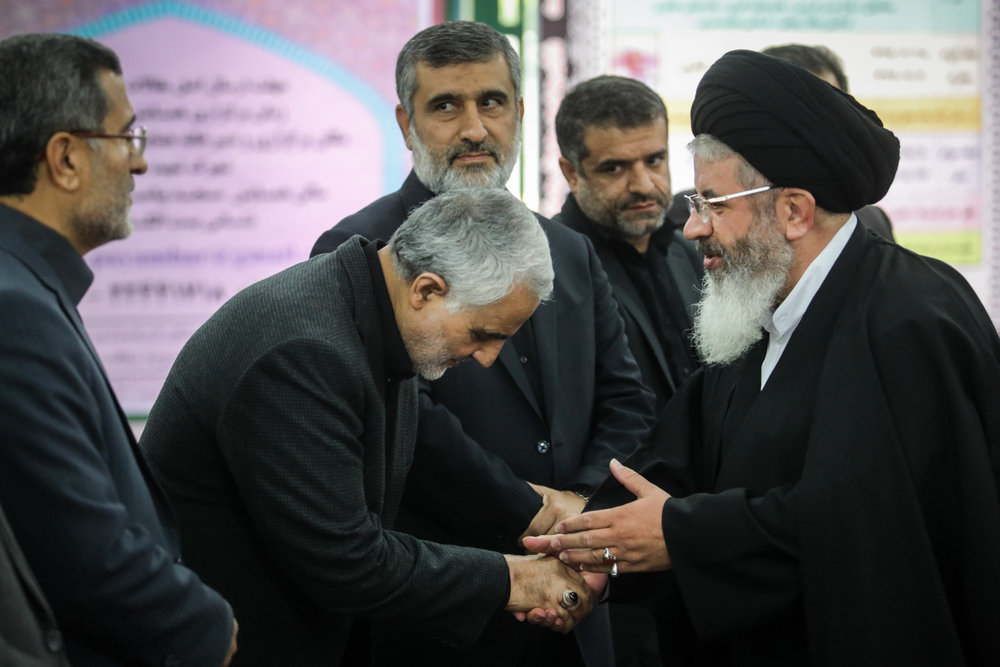
Hajizadeh next to Qasem Soleimani (2018)

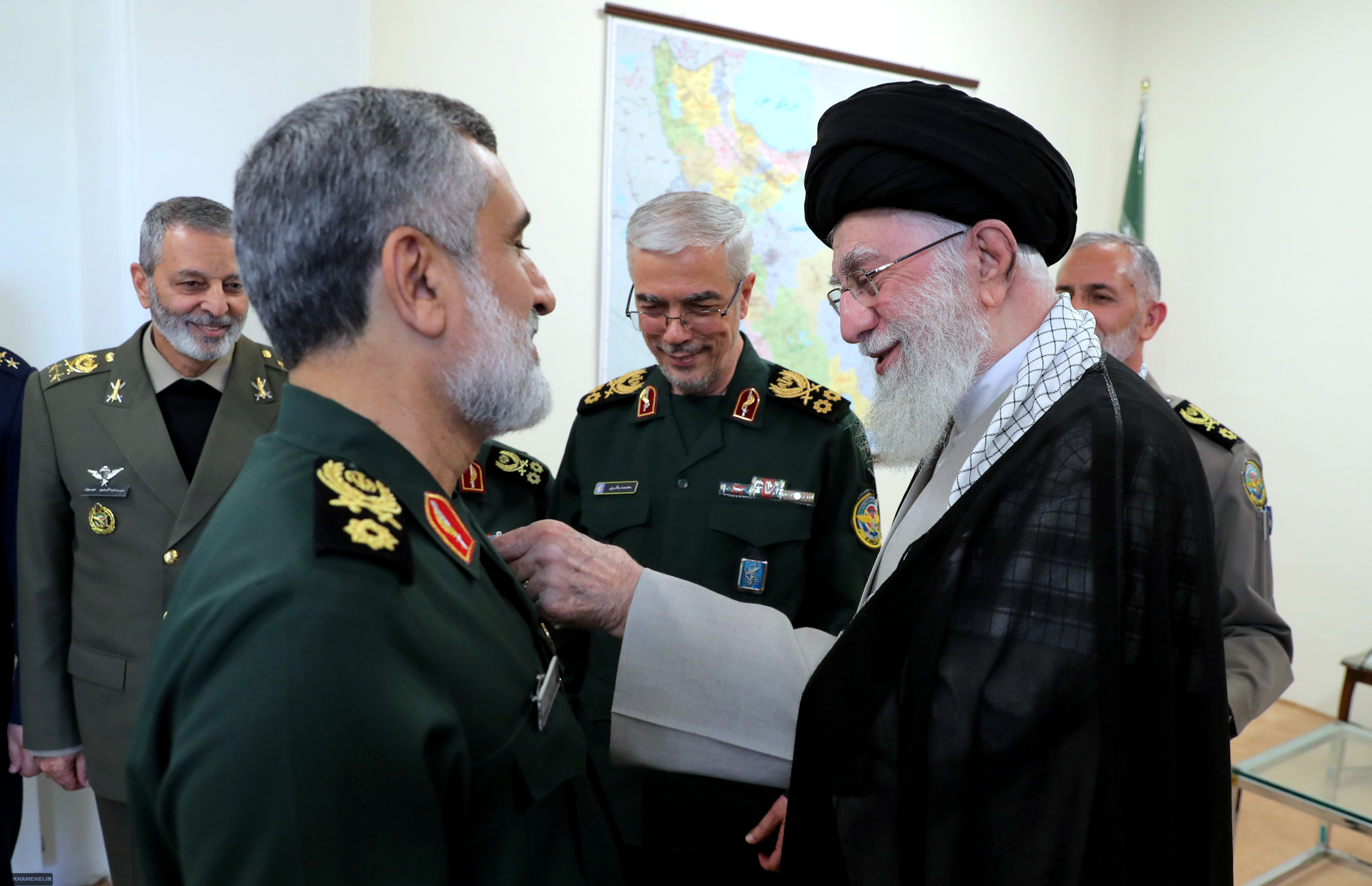
Hajizadeh receiving the Order of Fath from the Supreme Leader of Iran, after October missile strikes on Israel

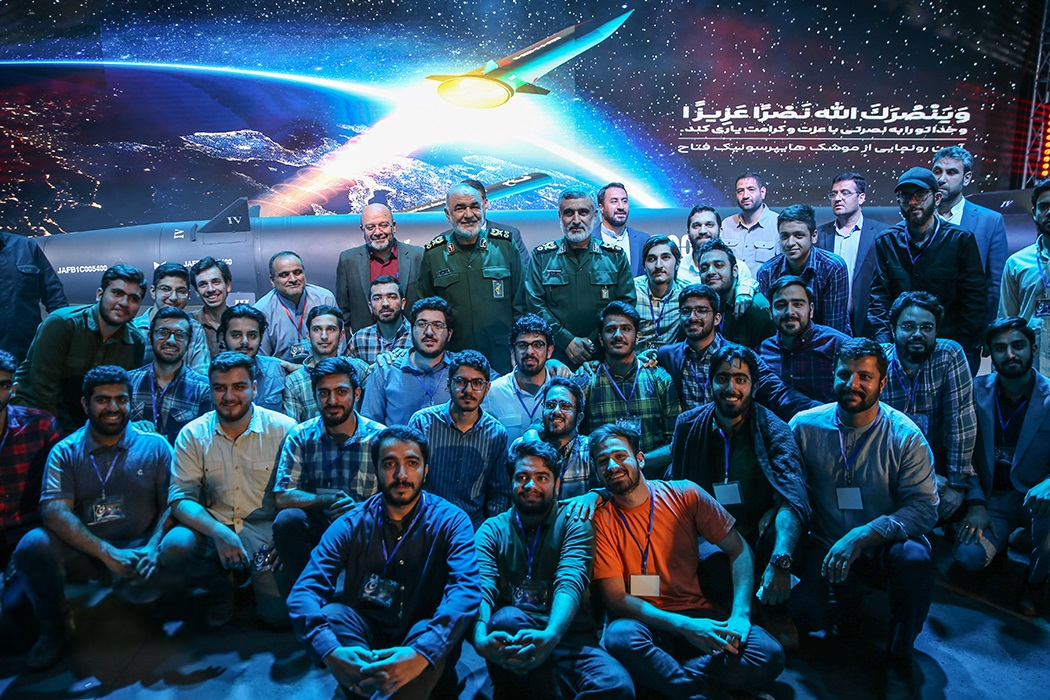
Unveiling ceremony of Fattah-1 hypersonic missile, 2023

== See also ==
- List of Iranian two-star generals since 1979
- Davoud Sheikhian
- Mohammad Bagheri
- Hossein Salami
- Mohammad Kazemi
- Hassan Mohaqeq
- Fereydoon Abbasi
- Mohammad Mehdi Tehranchi
- Abdolhamid Minouchehr
- Ahmadreza Zolfaghari Daryani
- Akbar Motalebizadeh
- Seyyed Amir Hossein Feghhi
- Saeed Borji
- Saeed Izadi
- Gholamreza Mehrabi
- Mehdi Rabbani
- Gholam Ali Rashid
- Ali Shadmani
- Behnam Shahriyari
- Targeted killing by Israel
- Assassinations of Iranian nuclear scientists

Military offices
| Preceded by Hossein Salami | Commander of the Revolutionary Guards Aerospace Force; 4 October 2009 – 13 June 2025 | Succeeded by Majid Mousavi |
