= Ali Bakouei =

Iranian nuclear scientist assassinated by Israel

- علی باکویی
- Born: Ali Mansour Bakouei Katrimi; January 17, 1975; Katrim, Dodangeh District, Sari County, Mazandaran province, Iran
- Died: June 13, 2025 (aged 50); Narmak neighbourhood, Tehran, Iran
- Cause of death: Assassinated by Israel in the first day of Twelve-Day War
- Burial place: Sari, Iran
- Education: Bachelor's degree in mechanical engineering; Master's degree in mechanical engineering; PhD in mechanical engineering; PhD in nuclear physics
- Alma mater: Malek-Ashtar University of Technology; University of Tehran
- Occupations: Nuclear physicist; Boxing coach and referee
- Years active: 1991 - 2025
- Employer: Islamic Republic of Iran
- Organization: Atomic Energy Organization of Iran
- Known for: Skilled in nuclear knowledge
- Title: Martyr
- Spouses: Mona Bakouei; (assassinated along with her husband)
- Children: Armin Bakouei; Yasamin Bakouei; (assassinated along with their father)

Ali Mansour Bakouei Katrimi (Persian: علی باکویی; January 17, 1975 — June 13, 2025) was an Iranian nuclear scientist who was involved in the Iranian nuclear program. Bakouei was an academic, renowned for his contributions to nuclear physics, materials science, and supercapacitor development. He served as an assistant professor, and held various scientific and academic positions throughout his career.

Bakouei, along with his entire family, died on June 13, 2025, during Israel's initial airstrike of the Twelve-Day War, when his home in the residential neighborhood of Narmak in Tehran was targeted.

== Life ==
Ali Bakouei was born on January 17, 1975 in village of Katrim, Dodangeh District, Sari County, Mazandaran province, Iran. Ali Bakouei grew up in the village of Katrim, located in the Dodangeh District of Sari County, Iran.

From an early age, he was recognized by teachers and peers for his exceptional talent and strong ethical character. While many of his contemporaries spent their leisure time on recreation, he dedicated himself to studying academic and scientific books.

His father, a hardworking farmer, described him as a well-mannered and helpful son who also assisted with agricultural work.

In addition to his academic pursuits, Bakouei was active in boxing, serving as both a coach and referee in Tehran Province. However, his academic achievements remained largely unknown to many of his colleagues in the sport until after his death.

He completed his primary and secondary education at his hometown school, then went to Sari to continue his studies. He finished high school at a school in Sari city and prepared to take the national exam for Iranian university entrance.

== Education ==
Bakouei took the national university entrance exam in Iran (Konkour) and was accepted to study mechanical engineering at Malek-Ashtar University of Technology in Isfahan branch. At the same time, he received a scholarship from the Ministry of Defence and Armed Forces Logistics of Iran. After completing his undergraduate studies, he was admitted to the master's program at the same university, where he earned a master's degree in the same field. Following his master's degree in mechanical engineering, he also obtained a doctorate in the same field at the same university. Bakouei later earned another doctorate in nuclear physics at University of Tehran.

Ali Bakouei's educational background is as follows:

- Undergraduate studies in the field of mechanical engineering at Malek-Ashtar University of Technology, Isfahan branch
- Received a scholarship from the Ministry of Defence and Armed Forces Logistics of Iran
- Master's degree in mechanical engineering at Malek-Ashtar University of Technology
- PhD in mechanical engineering at Malek-Ashtar University of Technology
- PhD in nuclear physics at University of Tehran

== Careers ==
Bakouei was an expert in various sciences, including mechanics, and held a PhD in nuclear physics. Additionally, he never gave up on sports. Boxing was his favorite sport, and he was preparing for a second-level box coaching certification.

Ali Bakouei Katrimi was recognized for his academic aptitude from an early age, dedicating much of his time to studying scientific and educational literature. Although his primary professional field has not been documented in detail, his peers regarded him as having a significant academic standing. In his youth, he helped his family with agricultural work in his native village of Katrim.

In addition to his scholarly pursuits, Bakouei Katrimi was actively involved in boxing. He served as a coach and referee in Tehran Province, contributing significantly to the sport's development at the regional level. However, his academic achievements remained largely unknown to his colleagues within the boxing community until his death.

== Personal life ==
Bakouei Katrimi was married to Mona. The couple had two children: a daughter named Yasamin (born c. 2002), and a son named Armin (born c. 2008).

== Death ==
Bakouei, who had been working as a mechanic instructor for several months after his retirement, was assassinated in an attack on 13 June 2025 by the Zionist regime and a missile strike on a 10-unit residential apartment building. All members of Bakouei's family (his wife Mona Bakouei, his 23-year-old daughter Yasamin Bakouei and his 17-year-old son Armin Bakouei) were killed, but no trace of the body of his daughter, Yasamin Bakouei —a 23-year-old Master's student at Sharif University of Technology— has been found in the early hours of the incident. Finally, the identity of the dead was determined by genetic testing.

The bodies of Ali Bakouei, his wife, and their children were all buried in Sari, Iran. Many Iranians attended the funeral ceremony of Ali Bakouei, his wife, and their children.

This attack was one in a series of hostile actions targeting Iranian scientific infrastructure and scientists.

Bakouei lived in a five-story residential building with ten units. An Israeli airstrike attack completely destroyed the fourth and fifth floors, killing the residents —ordinary people— on those floors. The explosion was so powerful that it created a hole through the floors, leaving no trace of the fourth and fifth levels. This building was residential, and its occupants were ordinary people. It was not affiliated with any organization and was owned by private individuals.

Photo gallery of the funeral

== See also ==
- Targeted killings by Israel
- Assassination of Iranian nuclear scientists
- Davoud Sheikhian
- Hossein Salami
- Amir Ali Hajizadeh
- Mohammad Kazemi
- Hassan Mohaghegh
- Fereydoon Abbasi
- Mohammad Mehdi Tehranchi
- Abdolhamid Minouchehr
- Ahmadreza Zolfaghari Daryani
- Akbar Motalebizadeh
- Seyyed Amir Hossein Feghhi
- Saeed Borji
- Saeed Izadi
- Gholamreza Mehrabi
- Mehdi Rabbani
- Gholam Ali Rashid
- Ali Shadmani
- Behnam Shahriyari
