= Katrim =

Katrim كتريم
- Village
- Location within Iran
- Coordinates: 36°10′56″N 53°12′34″E
- Country: Iran
- Province: Mazandaran
- County: Sari
- Bakhsh: Dodangeh
- Rural District: Farim

Population (2016)
  - Total: 101
- Time zone: UTC+3:30 (IRST)

Katrim (Persian: كتريم, also Romanized as Katrīm) is a village in Farim Rural District, Dodangeh District, Sari County, Mazandaran Province, Iran. At the 2006 census, its population was 101, in 44 families. Down from 141 people in 2006.
