= Amir Hossein Feghhi =

Iranian nuclear scientist (1978–2025)

Seyyed Amir Hossein Feghhi
- سید امیر حسین فقهی
- Born: September 11, 1978; Shiraz, Iran
- Died: June 13, 2025 (aged 46); Tehran, Iran
- Cause of death: Missile strike by Israel
- Education: Urmia University(B.S.); Amirkabir University of Technology (M.S., Ph.D.)
- Occupations: Deputy director of the Atomic Energy Organization of Iran; Professor and faculty member at Shahid Beheshti University
- Employer: Islamic Republic of Iran
- Organization: Atomic Energy Organization of Iran
- Known for: Nuclear engineering

Amir Hossein Feghhi (September 11, 1978 – June 13, 2025) was an Iranian nuclear engineer and academic, recognised for his contributions to the field of nuclear physics and nuclear engineering. He was the Deputy of the Atomic Energy Organization of Iran and a faculty member at Shahid Beheshti University (SBU). He was killed during the opening attacks of the Twelve-Day War.

Feghhi was one of Iran's nuclear scientists and an active researcher in cancer treatment using nuclear technology. He was among the Iranians involved in developing nuclear power plants for electricity generation. Feghhi played a role in Iran in designing and launching national projects for peaceful nuclear technology. He was recognized as one of Iran's scientific luminaries.

== Life and activities ==
Amir Hossein Feghhi was born on September 11, 1978, in Shiraz, Iran, and completed his primary and secondary education in his hometown.

He earned a bachelor's degree in nuclear physics from Urmia University and went on to earn a master's degree (2003) and a Ph.D. in nuclear engineering with a focus on energy (2008), from Amirkabir University of Technology. In 2007, he took part in a research program at the European Organization for Nuclear Research (CERN) in Switzerland, deepening his expertise before returning to Iran.

From 2002 to 2004, he was a member of the incident analysis team for the FMP (Final Major Project) project at the Atomic Energy Organization of Iran (AEOI). He also served as the head of the "Nuclear Science and Technology Research Institute" for a period. Additionally, he was a member of the editorial board for the quarterly journal of Nuclear Technology and Energy at SBU, head of the Radiation Applications group at the same university, and the authorized representative of SBU on the Permanent Committee for Space Radiation at the Iranian Space Agency (ISA). He also served as head of the Nuclear Science and Technology Research Institute for a time.

Feghhi was a faculty member at Shahid Beheshti University's Faculty of Nuclear Engineering from 2008, and became a full professor in 2016. He has also held positions such as Director of the Radiation Application Group and represented the university on the Iranian Space Organization's Permanent Committee on Space Radiation. In addition to his academic work, Feqhi has held several administrative roles at the university, including Director of Faculty Affairs, Secretary of the Executive Recruitment Board, and Secretary of the Special Audit Board. He has made contributions to radiopharmaceutical research, which is crucial in cancer treatment.

During his time at SBU, he held various positions, including "Director of Faculty Affairs", "Secretary of the Recruitment Executive Committee", and "Secretary of the University's Promotion Committee".

== Education ==
The educational stages that Feghhi completed are as follows:

- Ph.D. in Nuclear Engineering (Energy Specialization)

Amirkabir University of Technology, Tehran, Iran, October 2008.

- Master’s in Nuclear Engineering (Energy Specialization)

Amirkabir University of Technology, Tehran, Iran, June 2003.

- Bachelor’s in Physics (Nuclear Specialization)

Urmia University, Urmia, Iran, September 2000.

== Career ==
Feghhi, who had been appointed by Mohammad Eslami, the head of Atomic Energy Organization of Iran, as an advisor and special assistant to the head of the organization, has multiple scientific and research backgrounds, including being a full professor of nuclear physics and a faculty member at the "School of Nuclear Engineering" at Shahid Beheshti University in Tehran. He was the Deputy of the Atomic Energy Organization of Iran at the time of his death. He has published various academic books and research articles in the field of nuclear science and technology.

== Scientific and executive career ==
Feghhi's scientific and executive positions were:

No.	Position	Responsibility Period	Institution
1	Secretary of the Selected Committee of the Faculty of Nuclear Engineering	2019–2025	Shahid Beheshti University
2	Editorial Board Member of the Journal of Technology and Nuclear Energy	2018–2025	Shahid Beheshti University
3	Member of the Health, Safety, and Environment Policy Council	2018–2025	Shahid Beheshti University
4	Head of the Radiation Applications Department	2010–2015	Shahid Beheshti University
5	Research and Executive Deputy of the Faculty of Nuclear Engineering	2011–2019	Shahid Beheshti University
6	Elected Representative of the University President in the Working Group for Evaluating the Scientific Capabilities of Faculty Members in the Faculty of Nuclear Engineering	2010–2025	Shahid Beheshti University
7	Member of the Talented Youth Guidance Council	2011–2025	Shahid Beheshti University
8	Scientific Secretary of the Third National Conference on Space Radiation	2013	Iranian Space Agency
9	Authorized Representative of Shahid Beheshti University in the Permanent Committee on Space Radiation	2011–2025	Iranian Space Agency
10	Executor of Scientific and Industrial Projects	2007–2025	Shahid Beheshti University
11	Advisor and Supervisor for Master's and Doctoral Projects	2005–2025	Amirkabir University; Shahid Beheshti University; Sharif University of Technology; Qom University; Islamic Azad University (Science and Research Branch)
12	Conducting Workshops on Nuclear Calculations and Measurements	2001–2025	Shahid Beheshti University
13	Teaching Graduate Courses in Nuclear Engineering	2009–2014	Sharif University of Technology; Shahid Beheshti University
14	Member of the Incident Analysis Team in the FMP Project	2002–2004	Atomic Energy Organization of Iran

== Industrial career ==
He was also very active in the industry and successfully completed various projects and cooperations, including:

- Effective collaboration in the establishment and operation of the first radiation processing site in the private sector of the country.
- Participation and cooperation in the implementation, establishment, and obtaining of international certifications ISO 9001:2015 and ISO 13485:2016 based on ISO 11137 at the Shahrekord radiation processing system.
- Design and construction of two-phase gas-liquid flow meters.
- Design and construction of a two-phase test loop aimed at the fabrication and calibration of two-phase gas-liquid flow meters.
- Design, construction, and calibration of a coating thickness gauge probe based on the beta backscatter method.
- Design and construction of a density measurement device using gamma rays for monitoring petroleum products – Patent registered.
- Design and construction of a laboratory prototype for diagnosing distillation column faults through gamma ray scanning – Patent registered.

== Academic honors and achievement ==
Feghhi was recognized for his excellence in teaching and research, receiving accolades such as the "National Exemplary Professor award" in 2010 and being named a "Distinguished Researcher" at Shahid Beheshti University in both 2010 and 2015.

Feghhi's academic achievements include the following honors:

- 2019
  - National Distinguished Professor Award (Iran, 2019)
- 2015
  - Outstanding Researcher Award, Shahid Beheshti University (2015)
- 2012
  - First Prize in Developmental Research, 15th Kharazmi Youth Festival (2012)
- 2011
  - Exemplary Lecturer Award, Shahid Beheshti University (2011)
- 2010
  - Top Researcher Award, Shahid Beheshti University (2010)
  - Distinguished Researcher at Shahid Beheshti University (2010)
- 2009
  - Second Prize in Applied Research, 23rd International Kharazmi Festival (2009)
- 2007
  - Research Fellowship, CERN (European Organization for Nuclear Research, 2007)
- Publications
  He authored/translated specialized books on:
  - Industrial applications of radioisotopes
  - Advanced materials science
  - Steel production technologies
  Published by leading national and international publishers.

== Death ==
Feghhi was one of the people killed during the attacks carried out by Israel against Iran in June 2025. Following Israel's morning attack on Iran on June 13, 2025 (Fridays are the weekly holiday in Iran), Feghhi's personal residence was hit by a missile and he was killed. Another five Iranian nuclear scientists were killed in this attack. His funeral held on 28 June was set to take place along with those of all the top commanders killed during the Twelve-Day War.

== See also ==
- Nuclear program of Iran
- Assassinations of Iranian nuclear scientists
- Twelve-Day War
- Abdolhamid Minouchehr
- Ahmadreza Zolfaghari Daryani
- Fereydoon Abbasi
- Mohammad Mehdi Tehranchi
- Saeed Borji
- Ali Bakooyi
