= Saeed Izadi =

Iranian military officer (1964–2025)

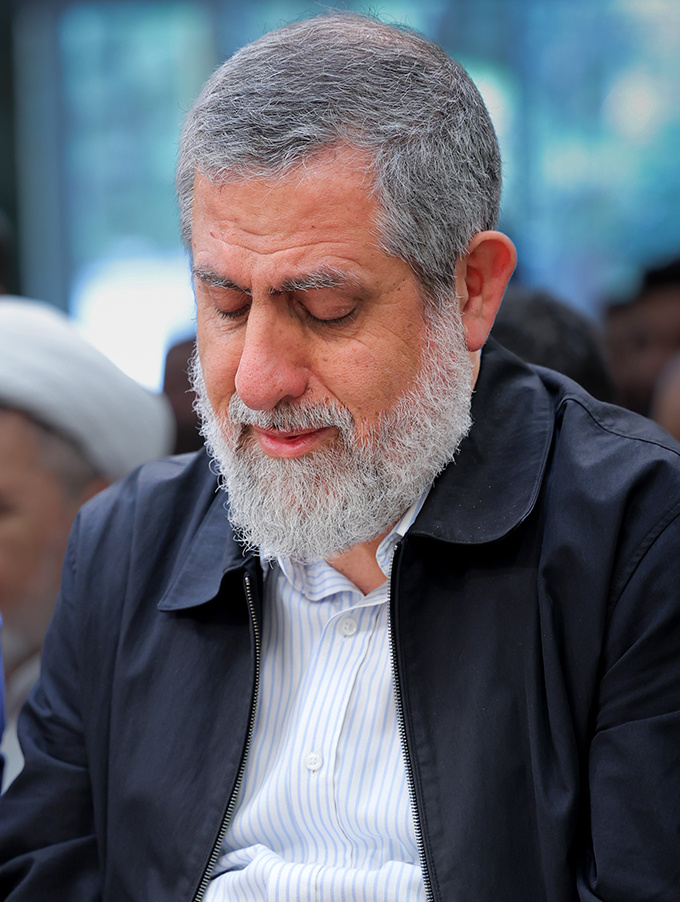
- Native name: سعید ایزدی
- Nickname: Haj Ramadan
- Born: 1964; Imperial State of Iran (present-day Iran)
- Died: 21 June 2025 (aged 60–61) Qom, Iran
- Allegiance: Iran
- Branch: IRGC
- Service years: 1980s–2025
- Rank: Brigadier General
- Commands: Head of the "Palestine Corps" of the Quds Force
- Conflicts: Iran–Iraq War; Twelve-Day War †

Mohammad-Saeed Izadi (Note: also known by his nickname Haj Ramadan (حاج رمضان) and as Sa'id Izadi, Ramazan Izadi, and Sa'id Abedini) (Persian: محمدسعید ایزدی, 1964 – 21 June 2025), better known as Saeed Izadi, was an Iranian military officer who was the commander of the Palestine Corps' of the IRGC's Quds Force.

From the late 2010s, he headed the "Palestine Corps" of the Quds Force, through which Iran provided funding, weapons, and training to Hamas, Palestinian Islamic Jihad, and other Palestinian groups.

Izadi played a pivotal role in building the Axis of Resistance, expanding Iran’s influence through funding, arms‑trafficking, and operational coordination with Hamas, Hezbollah, Palestinian Islamic Jihad, and others. Izadi was sanctioned by both the United States and the United Kingdom for his central role in financing and coordinating militant operations for terrorist groups.

Izadi was killed on 21 June 2025 during the Twelve-Day War between Iran and Israel.

== Biography ==
According to an intelligence document published in February 2025, Izadi was born in 1964 to a religious family from Qom province, Iran. He earned a bachelor's degree in electronic engineering at Khajeh Nasir Toosi University in Tehran.

Izadi joined the Islamic Revolutionary Guard Corps (IRGC) during the Iran–Iraq War in the 1980s, initially serving in its intelligence branch. He later completed officer training at the IRGC military academy. In the 1990s, he was deployed to operational arenas outside Iran, including Lebanon, where he worked with the Hezbollah on rocket infrastructure development, and Sudan, which served as a weapons smuggling corridor to the Middle East.

=== Education and IRGC career ===
According to some sources, Izadi holding a PhD in Electronic Engineering from Khajeh Nasir Toosi University of Technology. Izadi began his career during the Iran–Iraq War and later held command positions in Kurdistan Province, the IRGC General Staff, and the Quds Force.

He began his military career in 1979 as a member of the Islamic Revolutionary Guard Corps. During the Iran–Iraq War, he served as a mid-level commander. Mohammad Saeed Izadi served as the commander of the Kurdistan Corps from 1982 to 1983. He then became the commander of the Hamzeh Seyyed ol-Shuhada headquarters until 1985, followed by his role as the commander of the Najaf Ashraf headquarters until 1987. Subsequently, he was transferred to the IRGC Joint Headquarters, where he held the position of deputy commander of the IRGC until 1989.

After the conclusion of the Iran–Iraq War, Izadi was appointed commander of the IRGC Ground Forces, a position he held until 1993. Subsequently, he oversaw the planning, programs, and budget of the General Staff of the Armed Forces of the Islamic Republic of Iran until 2006, before being transferred to the Quds Force.

=== Head of the "Palestine Corps" ===
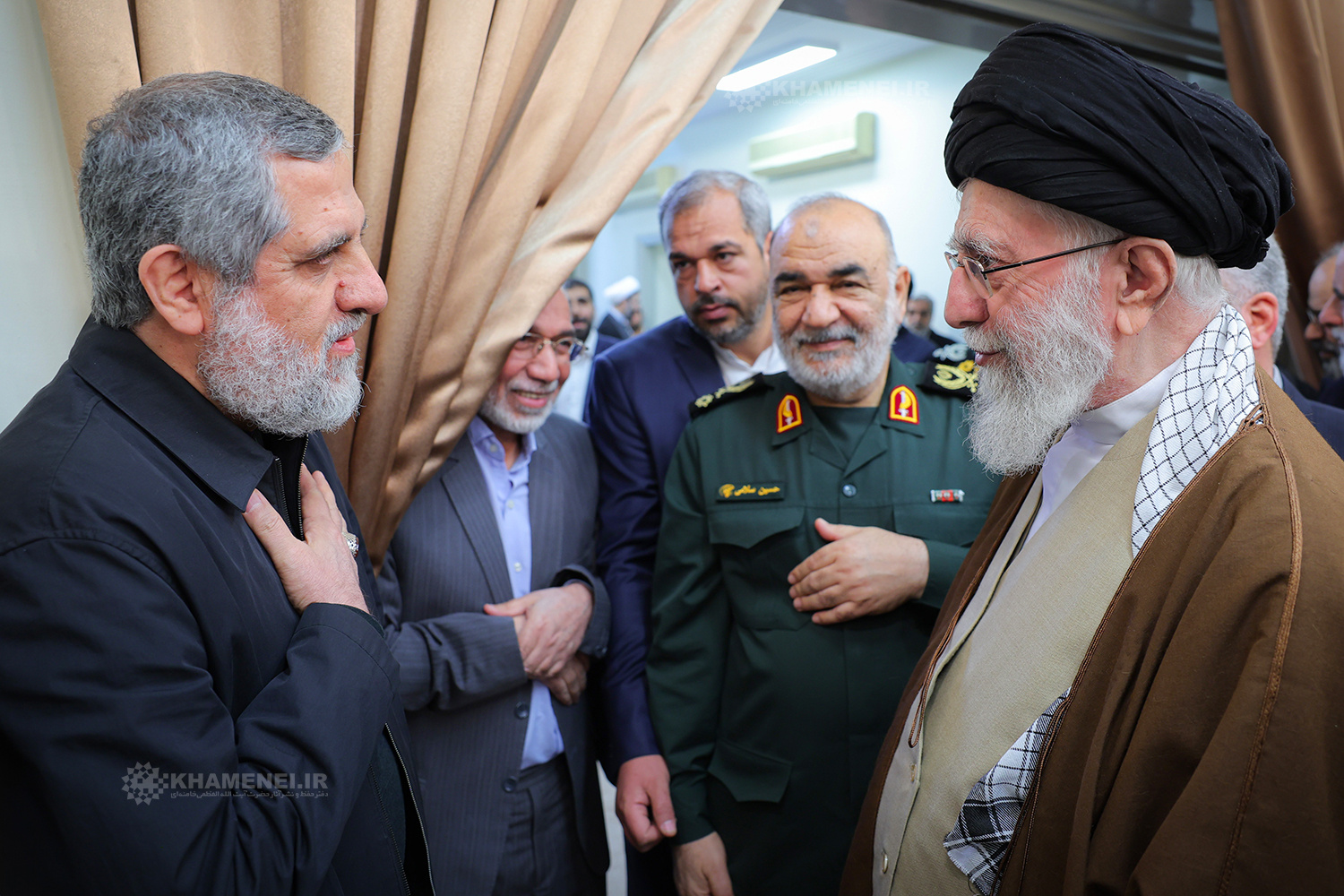
The Supreme Leader of Iran meets with Brigadier General Mohammad Saeed Izadi.: Mohammad Saeed Izadi (left), a brigadier general in the Islamic Revolutionary Guard Corps who was killed in the Israeli attacks on Iran in June 2025.; Hossein Salami (nearly in the middle of the picture in military uniform), was a major general in the Islamic Revolutionary Guard Corps who was killed in the Israeli attacks on Iran in June 2025.; Ali Khamenei (right), the former leader of the Islamic Republic of Iran who was killed in 2026 Iran war.

According to intelligence assessments, around 2014 Izadi was appointed head of the "Palestine Corps," the Quds Force division responsible for operations in the Israel–Palestine theater. In this role, he oversaw the transfer of tens of millions of dollars annually to Hamas, trained rocket manufacturing cells in the Gaza Strip, and developed weapons smuggling networks through East Africa, Syria, and Lebanon. Izadi played a pivotal role in building the Axis of Resistance. Retrieved documents reflected Izadi's role over a number of years in "building the Resistance Axis", under Iranian leadership.

On 1 April 2024, Iranian media reported that Izadi had been killed in an Israeli airstrike in Damascus, Syria, but the report was later denied.

=== Coordinating role with Hamas and the “Axis of Resistance” ===
Saeed Izadi served as the commander of the Palestine Corps within the IRGC Quds Force, where he was responsible for directing financial, logistical, and training support to Hamas. He played a pivotal role in establishing and expanding Iran’s Axis of Resistance, relations with Hamas, Hezbollah, and Palestinian Islamic Jihad.

=== Weapon Transfer Projects “Tufan 1” & “Tufan 2” ===
Documents released by the Israel Defense Forces reveal that Izadi spearheaded the "Tufan‑1" ($21M weapons) and "Tufan‑2" ($25M weapons) projects, which aimed to transfer advanced weaponry to Hamas.

== Sanctions ==
Izadi was sanctioned in 2019 by the U.S. Department of the Treasury under Executive Order 13224, which targets terrorists and those providing support to terrorism or acts of terrorism. The designation identified Izadi as a key official within the Quds Force’s “Palestine Branch”, responsible for coordinating the IRGC's support to militant groups, particularly Hamas and Palestinian Islamic Jihad (PIJ). The U.S. Treasury accused him of directing financial transfers, arms shipments, and paramilitary training to these organizations, thereby playing a central role in Iran’s regional strategy to undermine Israeli and Western interests through proxy forces.

The United Kingdom also sanctioned Izadi, citing his instrumental involvement in Iranian efforts to fund and operationally support Palestinian armed factions. Both sets of sanctions entailed asset freezes and prohibitions on transactions with financial institutions under U.S. or U.K. jurisdiction, marking Izadi as a key facilitator of Iran’s proxy militant activities.

=== International authority ===
Izadi was sanctioned by both the United States and the United Kingdom for his central coordination and funding of militant operations involving Hamas and Palestinian Islamic Jihad (e.g., under U.S. Executive Order 13224).

== Assassination ==
On 21 June 2025, Israel's Defense Minister Israel Katz confirmed that an Israeli airstrike targeted a residential apartment in Qom, killing Izadi. Katz described the operation that killed him as a significant success for Israel's intelligence services and air force. Behnam Shahriyari, the mastermind behind the supply of arms to Hamas, Hezbollah and the Houthis, was killed in the same attack.

Iran confirmed his death on 26 June 2025. His funeral was held on 28 June along with those of all the top commanders and nuclear scientists killed during the Twelve-Day War.

=== Prior Israeli assassination attempts ===
Izadi survived at least three targeted airstrikes by Israel in Syria during 2024–2025, including in Damascus suburbs, before being killed in June 2025.

== See also ==
- Nuclear program of Iran
- Assassinations of Iranian nuclear scientists
- Abdolhamid Minouchehr
- Ahmadreza Zolfaghari Daryani
- Fereydoon Abbasi
- Mohammad Mehdi Tehranchi
- Seyyed Amir Hossein Feghhi
