= Abdolhamid Minouchehr =

Iranian scientist (1962–2025)

- عبدالحمید مینوچهر
- Born: 6 June 1962
- Died: 13 June 2025 (aged 63); Tehran, Iran
- Cause of death: Assassination by airstrike
- Occupations: Nuclear physicist; nuclear engineer
- Known for: Head of the Faculty of Nuclear Engineering at Shahid Beheshti University

Abdolhamid Minouchehr (Persian: عبدالحمید مینوچهر; 6 June 1962 – 13 June 2025) was an Iranian nuclear physicist and nuclear engineer. He served as the head of the Faculty of Nuclear Engineering at Shahid Beheshti University. Minouchehr was killed during the June 2025 Israeli strikes on Iran.

== Life and career ==
Abdolhamid Minouchehr was born on 6 June 1962 in the city of Tehran.

After completing his education in nuclear engineering and earning a PhD from Moscow State University, Minouchehr joined the faculty of Shahid Beheshti University. His specialization was in nuclear reactors, and he conducted significant research in nuclear simulation, advanced nuclear fuel design, and increasing the efficiency and safety of nuclear power plants.

He also served as the editor-in-chief of the electronic journal Nuclear Technology and Energy.

=== Death ===
On 13 June 2025, Minouchehr was killed in Tehran during the June 2025 Israeli strikes on Iran together with other nuclear scientists, at the age of 63. His funeral held on 28 June was set to take place along with those of all the top commanders killed during the Twelve-Day War.

== See also ==
- Nuclear program of Iran
- Assassinations of Iranian nuclear scientists
- Twelve-Day War
- Ahmadreza Zolfaghari Daryani
- Fereydoon Abbasi
- Mohammad Mehdi Tehranchi
- Saeed Borji
- Amir Hossein Feghhi
- Ali Bakouei Katrimi
