= Mohammad Mehdi Tehranchi =

Iranian physicist (1965–2025)

- محمدمهدی طهرانچی
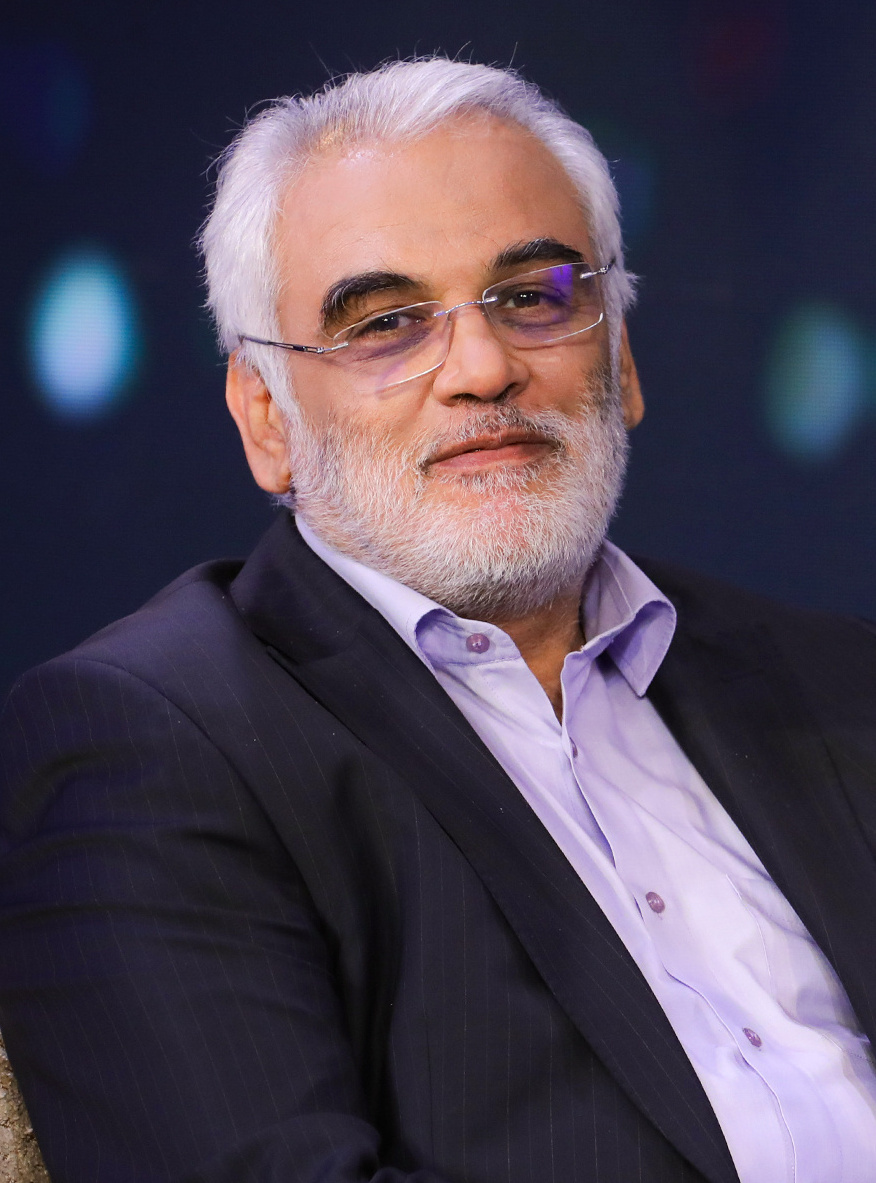
- Tehranchi in 2020
- Born: 21 March 1965; Tehran, Imperial State of Iran
- Died: 13 June 2025 (aged 60); Tehran, Iran
- Cause of death: Assassination by airstrike
- Education: Moscow Institute of Physics and Technology; Shahid Beheshti University

Mohammad Mehdi Tehranchi (Persian: محمدمهدی طهرانچی; 21 March 1965 – 13 June 2025) was an Iranian theoretical physicist and nuclear scientist. He was killed on 13 June 2025 during the Israeli strikes on the Iranian nuclear program.

== Career ==
A professor at the Laser and Plasma Research Institute and Department of Physics of Shahid Beheshti University, and a member of the board of trustees and president of the Islamic Azad University, he was a rector of the two branches of the Islamic Azad University (in Central Tehran and Tehran Province) and Shahid Beheshti University.

=== Awards and honors ===
1. Selected as a National Model Professor

2. Awarded the title of the best researcher at Shahid Beheshti University in various periods

3. Received the Allameh Tabatabaei Award for the best academic book

4. Member of the 41st Foundation of the Supreme Council of the Cultural Revolution

5. Received the First Class Scientific Medal from the President

=== Publications ===
1. Research on the current situation, design of the desired situation, University Press, Tehran, ISBN 978-964-01-1366-0.

2. Introduction to magnetic materials, University Press Center, Tehran, Author: B.D. Quality, C.D. Graham, Translated by: Mehdi Khodayi, Ramin Dehghan, Mohammad Mehdi Tehranchi, ISBN 3-8197-01-964-978

== Post(s) ==
Tehranchi was an Iranian theoretical physicist and nuclear scientist. A professor at the Laser and Plasma Research Institute and Department of Physics of Shahid Beheshti University, and a member of the board of trustees and president of the Islamic Azad University, he was a rector of the two branches of the Islamic Azad University (in Central Tehran and Tehran Province) and Shahid Beheshti University.

== Personal life ==
Tehranchi was born in Tehran in 1965 into a religious family. He was married and had four children.

== Sanctions ==
The US State Department, by issuing an official statement titled "Restrictions on Iranian Nuclear Scientists", placed five of the country's nuclear scientists, including Mohammad Mehdi Tehranchi, on its sanctions list.

== Death ==
Tehranchi was killed on 13 June 2025 during the Israeli strikes on the Iranian nuclear program at the start of the Twelve-Day War. His funeral on 28 June was set to take place alongside those of other scientists and military commanders killed during the Twelve-Day War.

== See also ==
- Nuclear program of Iran
- Assassinations of Iranian nuclear scientists
- Twelve-Day War
- Abdolhamid Minouchehr
- Ahmadreza Zolfaghari Daryani
- Fereydoon Abbasi
- Amir Hossein Feghhi
- Saeed Borji
- Ali Bakouei Katrimi
