= Fereydoon Abbasi =

Iranian nuclear scientist and politician (1958–2025)

- فریدون عباسی
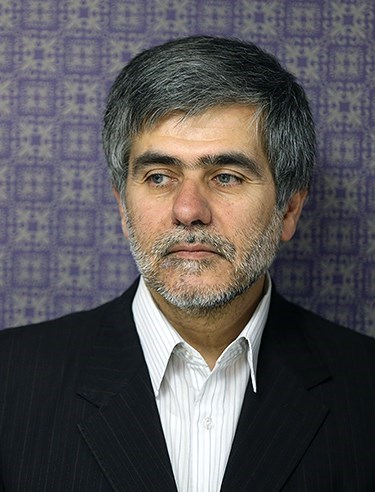
- Abbasi in 2015

Member of the 11th Parliament of Iran
- In office 27 May 2020 – 26 May 2024
- Constituency: Kazerun

Head of Atomic Energy Organization of Iran (AEOI)
- In office 13 February 2011 – 16 August 2013
- President: Mahmoud Ahmadinejad
- Deputy: Mohammad Ahmadian
- Preceded by: Mohammad Ahmadian (acting)
- Succeeded by: Ali Akbar Salehi

Personal details
- Born: 11 July 1958 Abadan, Imperial State of Iran
- Died: 13 June 2025 (aged 66) Tehran, Iran
- Cause of death: Assassination by airstrike
- Party: Association of Islamic Revolution Loyalists
- Education: Shahid Beheshti University; PhD in nuclear physics

Military service
- Branch/service: IRGC (rumored)

Fereydoon Abbasi-Davani (Note: Persian: فریدون عباسی دوانی) (11 July 1958 – 13 June 2025) was an Iranian nuclear engineer and a member of IRGC who was head of the Atomic Energy Organization of Iran from 2011 to 2013. A principlist who also served in the Iranian Parliament, he was killed in an airstrike by Israel on 13 June 2025. He had previously been wounded in an assassination attempt in 2010.

== Early life and education ==
Abbasi was born in Abadan, Iran on 11 July 1958. He held a PhD in nuclear physics.

== Career ==
Abbasi was a professor of nuclear physics at Shahid Beheshti University and was reportedly a member of Iran's Islamic Revolutionary Guard Corps (IRGC) since the 1979 Islamic Revolution. He reportedly performed nuclear research at the Atomic Energy Organization of Iran (AEOI). Prior to his appointment as head of the AEOI he chaired the physics department at Tehran's Imam Hossein University.

Abbasi was appointed head of AEOI by then president Mahmoud Ahmadinejad on 13 February 2011 to succeed Ali Akbar Salehi. In his tenure, the AEOI was unwilling to cooperate with the International Atomic Energy Agency (IAEA). In fact, in May 2011, Abbasi was the recipient of a letter from the IAEA, where its Director General Yukiya Amano reiterated the agency's concerns about the "existence of a possible military dimension" to Iran's nuclear programme and stressed the importance of clarifying these issues, requesting prompt access to relevant locations, equipment, documentation and persons. In June 2011, Abbasi replied evasively, so much so that the IAEA Director could only repeat his request for credible assurances.

Abbasi was removed from office on 16 August 2013 and subsequently replaced by Salehi.

In 2020, Abbasi was elected to Iran's parliament (Majles), representing the city of Kazerun. His term began on 27 May 2020. In parliament, Abbasi continued to advocate for Iran's nuclear program and align himself with hardline political factions supportive of the country's defense and scientific development strategies.

=== Responsibilities and Executive Background ===
- Deputy for Student Affairs and Culture, Shahid Beheshti University, 2007–2016
- Founder and Secretary of the Iranian Nuclear Association, 2006–2013
- Head of the Physics Department, Imam Hossein University, 2006–2014
- Head of the Research Institute, Malek Ashtar University, 2005–2010
- Deputy for Postgraduate Education, Imam Hossein University, 2007–2010
- Director of Departments and Advisor to the Student Affairs Office of the Ministry of Science, Research and Technology, 2007–2010
- Head of the Physics Education and Research Center, Imam Hossein University, 2007–2010
- Responsible for supporting the Jihad-e-Sazandegi War in Fars Province and participating in various operations from the beginning to the end of the Iran-Iraq War
- Head of the Atomic Energy Organization in the 10th government in 2010
- Vice President in 2010

== Iranian nuclear program ==
Abbasi was regularly linked to the Nuclear Program of Iran. He had defended Iran's nuclear efforts as peaceful and essential to national sovereignty.

In a 2012 interview with Al-Hayat, Abbasi acknowledged that Iran had intentionally misrepresented aspects of its nuclear program to the IAEA and Western intelligence agencies. He stated "Sometimes we show weaknesses where we are not weak. Sometimes we show strengths where we are not strong. Later this became evident in talks with the IAEA".

=== Designation by the UN ===
Abbasi was "listed in an annex to U.N. Security Council Resolution 1747 of 24 March 2007, as a person involved in Iran's nuclear or ballistic missile activities". This resolution imposes an asset freeze and travel notification requirements. Abbasi was described as a "Senior Ministry of Defence and Armed Forces Logistics (MODAFL) scientist with links to the Institute of Applied Physics, working closely with Mahabadi" (also designated by the UN).

=== Sanctions ===
In December 2012, Fereydoon Abbasi was sanctioned by the U.S. Treasury. He was added to the Office of Foreign Assets Control's (OFAC) Specially Designated Nationals (SDN) List under the Non-Proliferation of Weapons of Mass Destruction (NPWMD) and Iran Financial Sanctions Regulations (IFSR) programs. This designation was issued under Executive Order 13382, which targets individuals involved in the development or spread of weapons of mass destruction and their delivery systems. As a result, any assets he may have had under U.S. jurisdiction were frozen, and U.S. persons were prohibited from conducting transactions with him.

In October 2023, the EU designated Abbasi-Davani under its Iran sanctions regime, imposing restrictions on his financial assets and freedom of movement.

=== 2010 assassination attempt ===
On 29 November 2010, Abbasi was wounded and narrowly survived an assassination attempt on a Tehran street, as a man on a motorbike attached a bomb to his car as he drove to work. A similar bomb attack the same day killed another scientist, Majid Shahriari, who also taught at Shahid Beheshti University.

== Death ==
Abbasi was killed on 13 June 2025 during the June 2025 American-Israeli attack on Iranian scientists and military officials in Tehran.

=== Funeral ===
His funeral held on 28 June was set to take place along with those of all the top commanders killed during the Twelve-Day War.

== See also ==
- Nuclear program of Iran
- Assassinations of Iranian nuclear scientists
- Twelve-Day War
- Abdolhamid Minouchehr
- Ahmadreza Zolfaghari Daryani
- Mohammad Mehdi Tehranchi
- Amir Hossein Feghhi
- Saeed Borji
- Ali Bakouei

== Notes ==
Academic offices
Preceded by Mohammad Nabavi	President of Imam Hossein University; 2001–2011	Succeeded by Alireza Hosseini
Political offices
Preceded by Mohammad Ahmadian (acting)	Head of Atomic Energy Organization; 2011–2013	Succeeded by Ali Akbar Salehi
