= Ahmadreza Zolfaghari Daryani =

Iranian nuclear scientist

Ahmadreza Zolfaghari
- احمدرضا ذوالفقاری
- Born: 26 November 1959; Iran
- Died: 13 June 2025 (aged 65); Tehran, Iran
- Cause of death: Assassination by airstrike
- Occupations: Professor of Nuclear physics and Nuclear engineering

Ahmadreza Zolfaghari Daryani (Persian: احمدرضا ذوالفقاری داریانی; 26 November 1959 – 13 June 2025) was an Iranian professor of nuclear physics and the dean of the Faculty of Nuclear Sciences at Shahid Beheshti University. He was killed during the June 2025 Israeli strikes on Iran.

== Life and career ==
Zolfaghari was a faculty member at the Faculty of Nuclear Engineering at Shahid Beheshti University. He reportedly played a significant role in education and research related to Iran’s nuclear sciences. Zolfaghari and Abdolhamid Minouchehr were both active in national and strategic projects involving the development of nuclear technology in Iran. He also participated in specialized committees related to the nuclear industry and contributed to the localization of nuclear technical knowledge.

He was also the editor-in-chief of the journal Nuclear Technology and Energy.

On 13 June 2025, he was killed during the June 2025 Israeli strikes on Iran at the age of 65. His funeral held on 28 June was set to take place along with those of all the top commanders killed during the Twelve-Day War.

== See also ==
- Nuclear program of Iran
- Assassinations of Iranian nuclear scientists
- Twelve-Day War
- Abdolhamid Minouchehr
- Fereydoon Abbasi
- Mohammad Mehdi Tehranchi
- Seyyed Amir Hossein Feghhi
- Saeed Borji
- Ali Bakouei Katrimi
