= Islamic Revolutionary Guard Corps =

Military organization in Iran

- سپاه پاسداران انقلاب اسلامی
- Seal of the IRGC

- Official flag (left) and ceremonial flag (right)
- Motto: Heraldic slogan: وَأَعِدُّوا لَهُمْ مَا اسْتَطَعْتُمْ مِنْ قُوَّةٍ (Arabic) "Prepare against them (the enemies) what you believers can of military power." (Quran 8:60)
- Founded: 5 May 1979; 47 years ago
- Ideology: Conservatism (Note: While the IRGC officially maintains a non-partisan stance according to Iranian law, political analysts and observers note that the organization is aligned closely with right-wing conservative Principlists.); Khomeinism; Shia Islamism; Theocracy
- Service branches: 1. Ground Forces; 2. Aerospace Force; 3. Navy; 4. Quds Force; 5. Basij
- Headquarters: Tehran, Iran
- Website: sepahnews.ir

Leadership
- Commander-in-Chief: Maj. Gen. Ahmad Vahidi
- Deputy Commander-in-Chief: Maj. Gen. Mostafa Izadi

Personnel
- Conscription: ≈50,000 (2019), recruited mostly from active members of Basij
- Active personnel: ≈150,000 (2025)

Expenditure
- Budget: $6.96 billion (2020)

Related articles
- History: Kurdish separatism in Iran; 1979 Kurdish rebellion; KDPI insurgency (1989–1996); Iran–PJAK conflict; Western Iran clashes; Arab separatism in Khuzestan; 1979 Khuzestan insurgency; Iran–Iraq War; Lebanese Civil War; 1982 Lebanon War; War in Afghanistan (2001–2021); United States invasion of Afghanistan; 2001 uprising in Herat; Insurgency in Balochistan; Insurgency in Sistan and Balochistan; 2006 Lebanon War; 2009 Iranian presidential election protests; Insurgency in Bahrain; Syrian civil war; Iranian intervention; War in Iraq (2013–2017); Iranian intervention; Russo-Ukrainian war; Iranian intervention; Attacks on US bases during the Middle Eastern crisis; 2024 Iran–Israel conflict; Twelve-Day War; 2025–2026 Iranian protests; 2026 Iran massacres; 2026 Iran war; Proxy conflicts with: Israel; Saudi Arabia
- Ranks: Rank

The Islamic Revolutionary Guard Corps (IRGC), (Note: Persian: سپاه پاسداران انقلاب اسلامی, romanized: Sepâh-e Pâsdârân-e Enqelâb-e Eslâmi, lit. 'Army of Guardians of the Islamic Revolution') also known as Sepah, (Note: Persian for 'soldiers/corps' (Sepoy)) Pasdaran, (Note: Persian for 'guardians') and Iranian Revolutionary Guards, is a multi-service military force of Iran and one of Iran's two military forces, the other being the Islamic Republic of Iran Army. It consists of five service branches: Ground Forces, Aerospace Force, Navy, Quds Force, and Basij. It is led by a commander-in-chief, who is appointed by and reports to the supreme leader of Iran.

The IRGC was officially established by Ruhollah Khomeini as a military branch in May 1979 in the aftermath of the Iranian Revolution. Whereas the Iranian Army (the Artesh) protects the country's sovereignty in a traditional capacity, the IRGC's constitutional mandate is to ensure the integrity of the Islamic Republic. Most interpretations of this mandate assert that it entrusts the IRGC with preventing foreign interference in Iran, thwarting coups by the traditional military, and crushing "deviant movements" that harm the ideological legacy of the Islamic Revolution.

The IRGC has approximately 125,000 personnel, as of 2024. The main body is the IRGC Ground Forces, which focus on maintaining internal order, but have recently moved towards expeditionary warfare also, projecting power for the Islamic Republic. The IRGC Navy is now Iran's primary force exercising operational control over the Persian Gulf, serving as a de facto coast guard. The IRGC Aerospace Force is responsible for the Iranian ballistic missile program and act as the country's space force. The Basij, a paramilitary volunteer militia that serves as the IRGC's auxiliaries, has a further approximately 90,000 active personnel. Lastly, the Quds Force is a unit specialized in unconventional warfare, military intelligence and clandestine operations, responsible for arming, training, advising and, in some cases, commanding pro-Iranian non-state actors abroad—such as Hezbollah and the Houthis. It operates a media arm, known as "Sepah News" within Iran. Currently, the IRGC is designated as a terrorist organization by Albania, Argentina, Australia, Bahrain, Bosnia and Herzegovina, Canada, Colombia, Costa Rica, the Dominican Republic, Ecuador, the European Union, Honduras, Iceland, Israel, Liechtenstein, Moldova, Montenegro, North Macedonia, Paraguay, Saudi Arabia, Serbia, Sweden, Trinidad and Tobago, Ukraine, and the United States.

Originating as a radical ideological militia, the IRGC has taken on a growing role in nearly every aspect of Iranian politics, economics (including energy and food industries) and society. In 2010, BBC News described the organization as a "business empire". In 2019, Reuters described it as "an industrial empire with political clout". IRGC's expanded social, political, military, and economic role under Mahmoud Ahmadinejad—especially during the 2009 presidential election and the suppression of post-election protests—has led many Western analysts to argue that it has surpassed even the country's ruling clerical class in terms of political power. In 2026, Reuters described the IRGC as a "state-within-a-state".

== Terminology ==
Government organizations in Iran are commonly known by one-word names that denote their function, rather than acronyms or shortened versions. The general public refers to the IRGC as Sepâh (سپاه; Sepoy; Sipahi). Sepâh has a historical connotation of soldiers, while in modern Persian it also describes a corps-sized unit. In modern Persian, Artesh (ارتش) is the more standard term for an army.

Pâsdârân (پاسداران) is the plural form of Pâsdâr (پاسدار), meaning "Guardian", and members of Sepah are known as Pāsdār, which is also their title and comes after their rank.

Apart from the name Islamic Revolutionary Guard Corps, the Iranian Government, media, and those who identify with the organization generally use Sepāh-e Pâsdârân (Army of the Guardians), although it is not uncommon to hear Pâsdârân-e Enghelâb (پاسداران انقلاب; Guardians of the Revolution), or simply Pâsdârân (پاسداران; Guardians) as well. Among the Iranian population, and especially among diaspora Iranians, using the word Pasdaran indicates hatred or admiration for the organization.

Most foreign governments and the English-speaking mass media tend to use the term Iranian Revolutionary Guards (IRG) or simply the Revolutionary Guards. In the US media, the force is frequently referred to interchangeably as the Iranian Revolutionary Guard Corps or the Islamic Revolutionary Guard Corps (IRGC). The US government standard is Islamic Revolutionary Guard Corps, while the United Nations uses Iranian Revolutionary Guard Corps.

In the emblem of the Islamic Revolutionary Guard Corps, the sentence above the weapon consists of a segment of the Quranic verse from Surah Al-Anfal —وَأَعِدُّوا لَهُمْ مَا اسْتَطَعْتُمْ مِنْ قُوَّةٍ—which, according to the translation by Abdullah Yusuf Ali, reads: "Against them make ready your strength to the utmost of your power."

== Organization ==
The force's main role is to provide national security. It is responsible for internal and border security, law enforcement, and Iran's missile forces. IRGC operations are geared towards asymmetric warfare and less traditional duties. These include the control of smuggling, control of the Strait of Hormuz, and resistance operations. The IRGC is intended to complement the more traditional role of the regular Iranian military, with the two forces operating separately and focusing on different operational roles.

The IRGC is a combined arms force with its own ground forces, navy, air force, intelligence, and special forces. It also controls the Basij militia, a volunteer-based force with 90,000 regular soldiers and 300,000 reservists. The IRGC is officially recognized as a component of the Iranian military under Article 150 of the Iranian Constitution. It is separate from, and parallel to, the other arm of Iran's military, which is called Artesh (another Persian word for an army). The IRGC is expected to assume control of any Iranian response, especially in the waters of the Persian Gulf, to attacks on its nuclear facilities.

=== History and structure ===
The IRGC was formed on 5 May 1979 by Abbas Duzduzani following the Iranian Revolution of 1979 in an effort to consolidate several paramilitary forces into a single force loyal to the new government and to function as a counter to the influence and power of the regular military, initially seen as a potential source of opposition because of its traditional loyalty to the Shah. From the beginning of the new Islamic government, the Pasdaran (Pasdaran-e Enghelab-e Islami) functioned as a corps of the faithful. The Constitution of the Islamic Republic entrusted the defense of Iran's territorial integrity and political independence to the regular military (artesh), while it gave the Pasdaran the responsibility of preserving the Revolution itself.

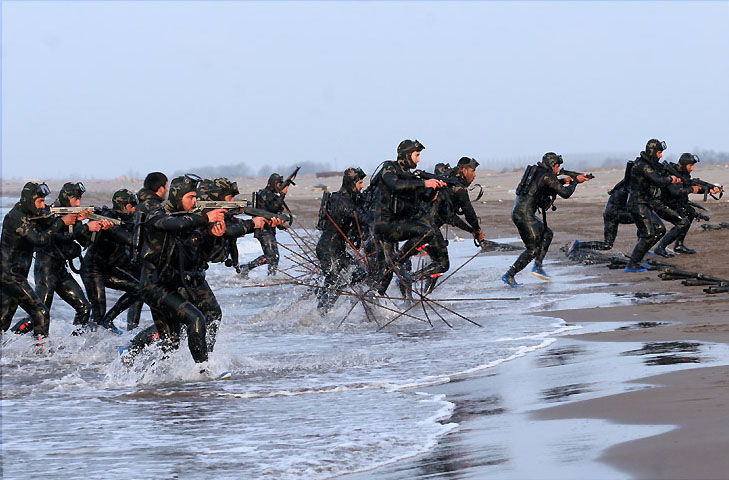
IRGC naval special forces of SNSF during the Great Prophet IX exercise

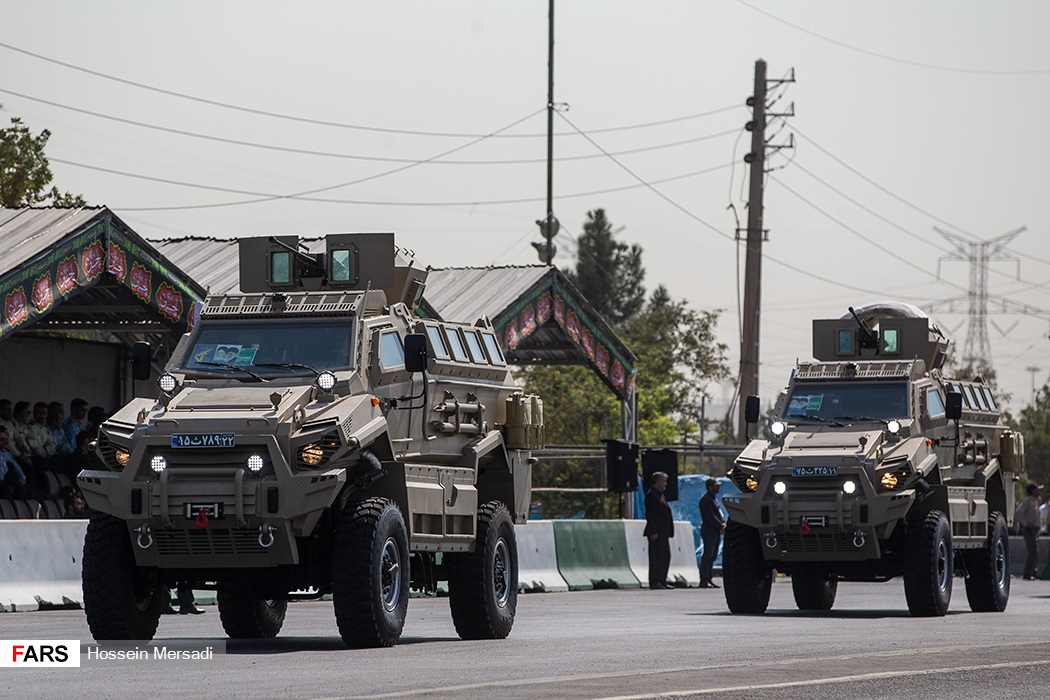
Toofan MRAPs during the Sacred Defense Parade, 2019

Ranks of the Islamic Revolutionary Guard Corps (IRGC)
Forces
Ground forces, Aerospace and Quds	Navy
Colonel General Pasdar	Admiral Pasdar
Lieutenant General Pasdar	Vice Admiral Pasdar
Major General Pasdar	Rear Admiral Pasdar
Brigadier General Pasdar	Commodore Pasdar
Second Brigadier General Pasdar	Second Brigadier Admiral
Colonel Pasdar	Captain Pasdar
Lieutenant colonel Pasdar	Frigate Captain Pasdar
Major Pasdar	Lieutenant Commander Pasdar
Captain Pasdar	Captain Lieutenant Pasdar
Lieutenant Pasdar	Lieutenant Pasdar
Second Lieutenant Pasdar	Second Lieutenant Pasdar
Junior Lieutenant Pasdar	Junior Lieutenant Pasdar
Sergeant Major Pasdar	Warrant Officer Pasdar
Second Sergeant Major Pasdar	Michman Pasdar
Sergeant Pasdar	Petty Officer Pasdar
Second Sergeant Pasdar	Second Petty Officer Pasdar
Junior Sergeant Pasdar	Junior Petty Officer Pasdar
Corporal Pasdar	Able Seaman Pasdar
Soldier Pasdar	Seaman Pasdar
Note: The forces of the Islamic Revolutionary Guard Corps are called "Pasdar". "Pasdar" is a Persian word meaning "Guardian" or "Watchman".

Days after Ayatollah Ruhollah Khomeini's return to Tehran on 1 February 1979, Mehdi Bazargan's interim administration established the Pasdaran under a decree issued by Khomeini on 5 May. The Pasdaran was intended to protect the Revolution and its principles, and to assist the ruling clerics in the day-to-day enforcement of the new government's Islamic codes and morality. There were other, perhaps more important, reasons for establishing the Pasdaran. The Revolution needed to rely on a force of its own rather than borrowing the previous regime's tainted units. As one of the first revolutionary institutions, the Pasdaran helped legitimize the Revolution and gave the new government an armed basis of support. Moreover, the establishment of the Pasdaran served notice to both the population and the regular armed forces that the Khomeini government was quickly developing its own enforcement body.

Thus, the Pasdaran, along with its political counterpart, Crusade for Reconstruction, brought a new order to Iran. In time, the Pasdaran would rival the police and the judiciary in terms of its functions.

Although the IRGC operated independently of the regular armed forces, it was often considered to be a military force in its own right due to its important role in Iranian defense. The IRGC consists of ground, naval, and aviation troops, which parallel the structure of the regular military. The Pasdaran was "given control of Iran's ballistic missile program in both missile employment and development.

Also contained under the umbrella of the more conventional Pasdaran, were the Basij Forces (Mobilization Resistance Force), a network of potentially up to a million active individuals who could be called upon in times of need. The Basij could be called to assist in the defense of the country against internal or external threats, but by 2008 was also deployed in mobilizing voters in elections. Another element was the Quds Force, a special forces element tasked with unconventional warfare roles and known to be involved in providing assistance and training to various militant organizations around the world.

The Pasdaran was closely associated with Supreme Leader Khamenei during his tenure from 1989 to his death in 2026. Khamenei used the Pasdaran to build support using expropriated state resources. Reportedly he reached "far down into the ranks and appointed new colonels and brigadiers. 'Khamenei micromanages the whole system, so everyone is loyal to him, He is hyperactive. He knows every low-ranking commander and even the names of their children'", according to Mehdi Khalaji of the Washington Institute for Near East Policy.

The Basij and Pasdaran were instrumental in crushing the Green Movement, and this gave them political supremacy in Iran. According to at least one source (Abbas Milani, the director of the Iranian Studies program at Stanford), the regime "clearly ... believed it was going to lose control, and the IRGC and the Basij saved the day. The result is that the IRGC now has the upper hand. Khamenei knows that without the IRGC he'd be out of a job in twenty-four hours."

Yahya Rahim Safavi, head of the IRGC since 1997, was dismissed as commander in chief of the Revolutionary Guards in August 2007. The dismissal of Safavi disrupted the balance of power in Iran to the advantage of conservatives. Analysis in the international press considered the removal of Safavi to be a sign of change in the defense strategies of Iran, but the general policies of the Iranian Revolutionary Guard Corps are not personally determined by its commander.

The Corps have occasionally distributed food aid packages.

On 16 March 2022, it established a new independent branch called the "Command for the Protection and Security of Nuclear Centres" involved with Iran's nuclear program.

=== Military structure ===
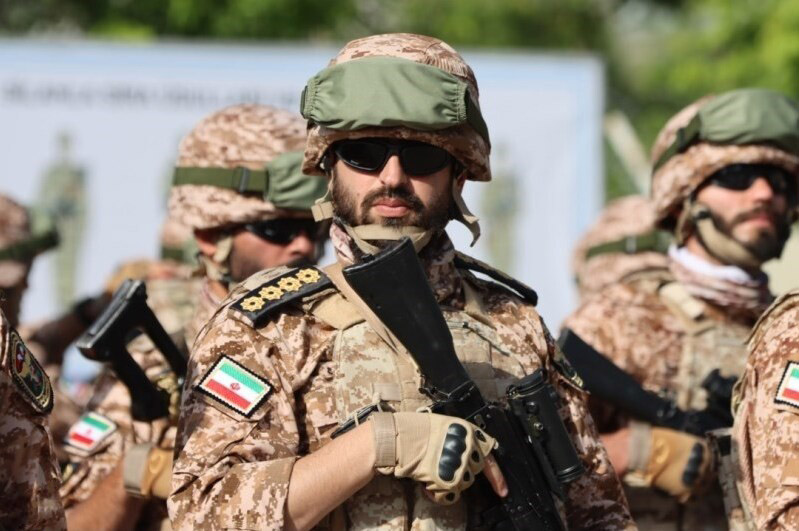
IRGC Ground Forces conducting training exercises in May 2025

In late July 2008, reports originating that the IRGC was in the process of dramatically changing its structure. In a shake-up, in September 2008 Iran's Revolutionary Guards established 31 divisions and an autonomous missile command. The new structure changes the IRGC from a centralized to a decentralized force with 31 provincial corps, whose commanders wield extensive authority and power. According to the plan, each of Iran's thirty provinces will have a provincial corps, except Tehran Province, which will have two.

==== Cyber Security Command of the Islamic Revolutionary Guard Corps ====
In 2007 command for cyber security was established part of cyberdefense of IRGC. It was renamed in 2014, abbreviated GCDC or CIOC.

- Advanced Persistent Threat 34

==== Basij ====
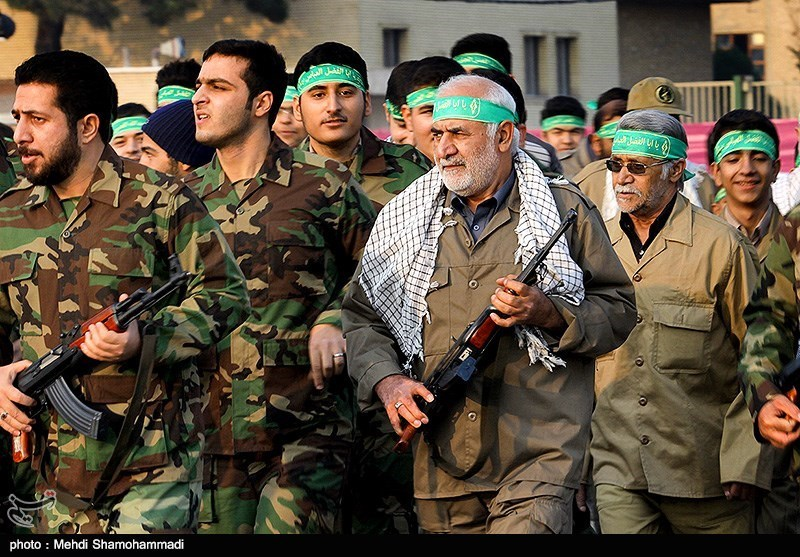
Gathering of Basij volunteers, 2013

Basij Mustazafin were initially separate organizations but were merged in 1980 into Corps and merged to its land forces since 2008. The Basij is a paramilitary volunteer militia or "plainclothes militia" founded by the order of the Ayatollah Khomeini in November 1979. On 4 November 1979, in an address to the Revolutionary Guards during the Iran hostage crisis, Khomeini ordered the creation of an army of "twenty million Iranians" (Artesh-e bis million), proclaiming:

Equip yourself, get military training and train your friends. Give military training to those who are not trained. In an Islamic country, everyone should be a soldier and have military training. ... a country with 20 million young people [should have] 20 million riflemen, an army of 20 million"

This pronouncement and Article 151 of the constitution, which calls for the government to "provide a program of military training, with all requisite facilities, for all its citizens, in accordance with the Islamic criteria, in such a way that all citizens will always be able to engage in the armed defense of the Islamic Republic of Iran," are believed to refer to the Basij. While "Iranian official estimates sometime put their total part-time and full-time strength at more than 20 million", others estimate the Basij as having "a core strength of 90,000, and up to 600,000" (CSIS, 11 January 2018, p. 4); at 100,000 with "hundreds of thousands of additional Basij could be mobilized in the event or an all-out war" (CRS, 23 May 2018, p. 18).

The Basij are "the most visible symbol" of the Pasdaran's strength, whose members "can be seen on street corners in every Iranian city". They are (at least in theory) subordinate to, and receive their orders from, the Iranian Revolutionary Guards and current Supreme Leader. However they have also been described as "a loosely allied group of organizations" including "many groups controlled by local clerics." Currently, the Basij serve as an auxiliary force engaged in activities such as internal security as well as law enforcement auxiliary, the providing of social service, organizing of public religious ceremonies, and as morality police and the suppression of dissident gatherings.

==== Quds Force ====
The elite Quds Force (or Jerusalem Force), sometimes described as the successor to the Shah's Imperial Guards, is estimated to be 2,000–5,000 in number. It is a special operations unit, handling activities abroad. The force's main mission is training, directing, and liaisoning with Iranian proxies.

==== Aerospace Force ====
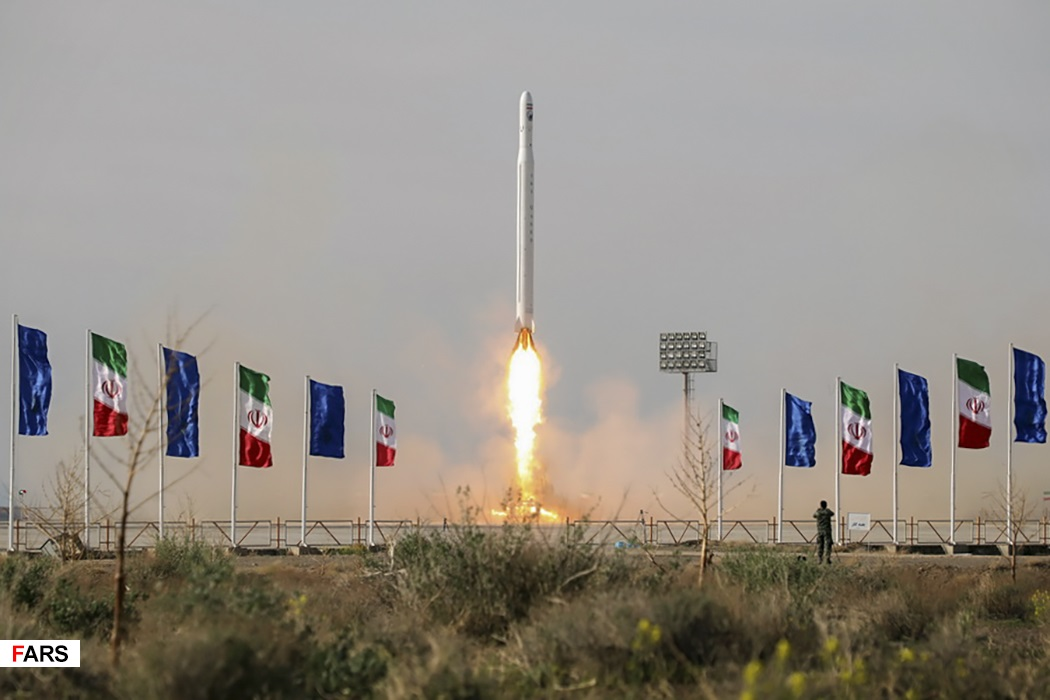
Launch of the Qased SLV

The Islamic Revolutionary Guard Corps Aerospace Force or Islamic Revolutionary Guard Corps Air and Space Force (IRGCASF; Persian: نیروی هوافضای سپاه پاسداران انقلاب اسلامی, romanized: niru-ye havâfazây-e sepâh-e pâsdârân-e enghelâb-e eslâmi, officially acronymed NEHSA) is the strategic missile, air, and space force within the Islamic Revolutionary Guard Corps (IRGC) of Iran. It was renamed from the IRGC Air Force into the IRGC Aerospace Force in 2009. Its 15,000 personnel man around 80 aircraft and operates several thousand short- and medium-range mobile ballistic missiles, including the Shahab-3/3B with a range of up to 2,100 kilometers.

==== Navy ====
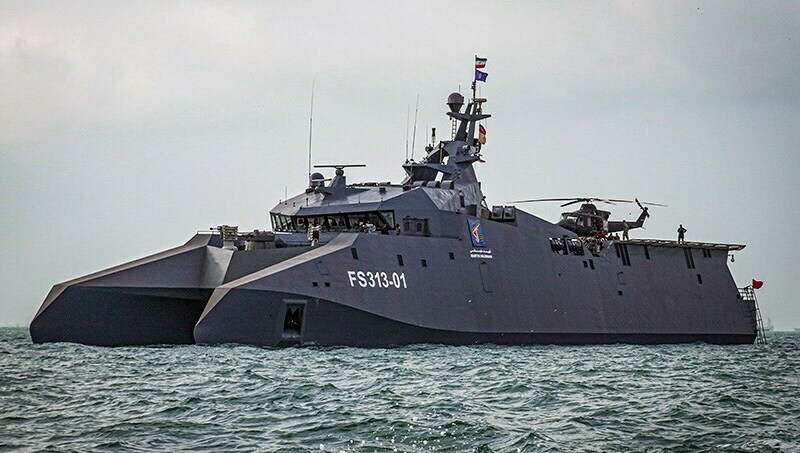
FS313-01 Shahid Soleimani in 2022 during the Sacred Defence Week parade

IRGC started naval operations using mainly swarm tactics and speedboats during "Tanker War" phase of the Iran–Iraq War.

IRGC Navy and the regular Artesh Navy overlap functions and areas of responsibility, but they are distinct in terms of how they are trained and equipped—and more importantly also in how they fight. The Revolutionary Guards Navy has a large inventory of small fast attack craft, and specializes in asymmetric hit-and-run tactics. It is more akin to a guerrilla force at sea, and maintains large arsenals of coastal defense and anti-ship cruise missiles and mines. It has also a Takavar (special force) unit, called Sepah Navy Special Force (S.N.S.F.).

==== Ground forces ====
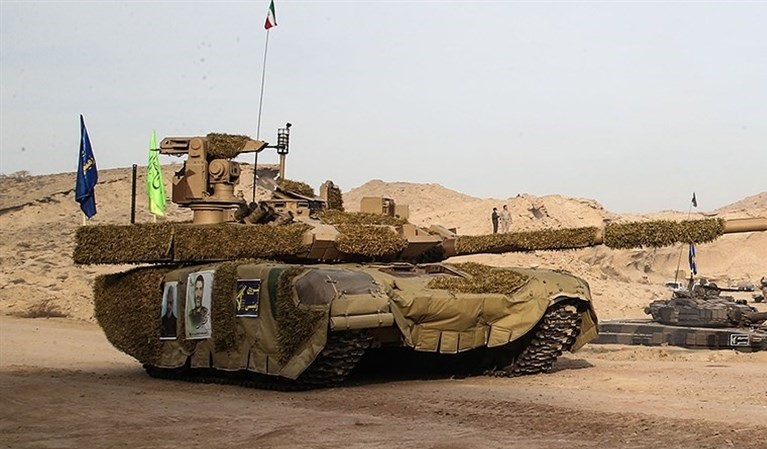
Karrar main battle tank of the IRGC-GF, participating in the Great Prophet XVII military exercise

==== Intelligence organization ====
Corps Intelligence directorate are accused of meddling in the 2021 Iranian presidential election.

==== Auxilaries ====
The IRGC has recruited, funded, and trained two key militias to fight in Syria, Iraq, and Yemen as well as Iranian Balochistan which are led by IRGC commanders and even operate from Iran. These are:

- Liwa Fatemiyoun (a Shia Afghan militia founded in 2013)
- Liwa Zainabiyoun (a Shia Pakistani militia founded in 2015)

=== Size ===
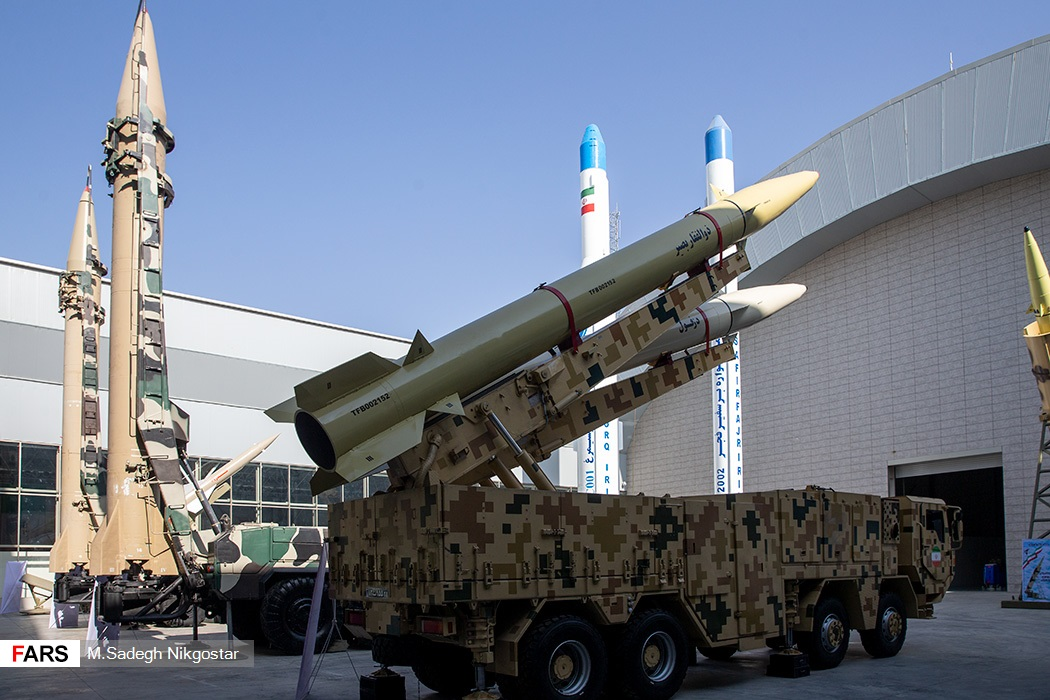
IRGC Aerospace Force missiles at an IRGC exhibition in Tehran, shows Shahab-1, Shahab-2, Zolfaghar and Dezful

The 2020 edition of The Military Balance, published by IISS, says the IRGC has about 190,000 active personnel and controls the Basij on mobilisation (as much as 40,000 active paramilitary forces). It estimates the Ground Force is 150,000 strong and the Aerospace Force, which controls Iran's strategic-missile force, has some 15,000 personnel. The Naval Forces are estimated to size at least 20,000, including 5,000 Marines.

=== Senior commanders ===
- Major General Hossein Salami (Commander-in-chief) (Note: Assassinated during the Twelve-Day War in June 2025.)
- Major General Mohammad Pakpour (Commander-in-chief) (Note: Assassinated by airstrikes in February 2026)
- Brigadier General Ahmad Vahidi (Commander-in-chief)
- Brigadier General Mohammad Karami (Revolutionary Guards' Ground Forces)
- Brigadier General Majid Mousavi (Revolutionary Guards' Aerospace Force)
- Commodore Alireza Tangsiri (Revolutionary Guards' Navy) (Note: Assassinated during the 2026 Iran war in March 2026.)
- Brigadier General Gholamreza Soleimani (Commander of the Mobilized Basij forces)
- Brigadier General Esmail Qaani (Quds Force)
- Brigadier General Mehdi Rabbani
- Brigadier General Gholamreza Mehrabi

== Symbols and uniforms ==
Branch	Flag	Uniform colors and patterns	
Branch	Flag	Service	Combat
Ground Force			
Aerospace Force			
Navy			
Quds Force			
Basij			

== Wars and external operations ==
=== Iran–Iraq War (1980–1988) ===
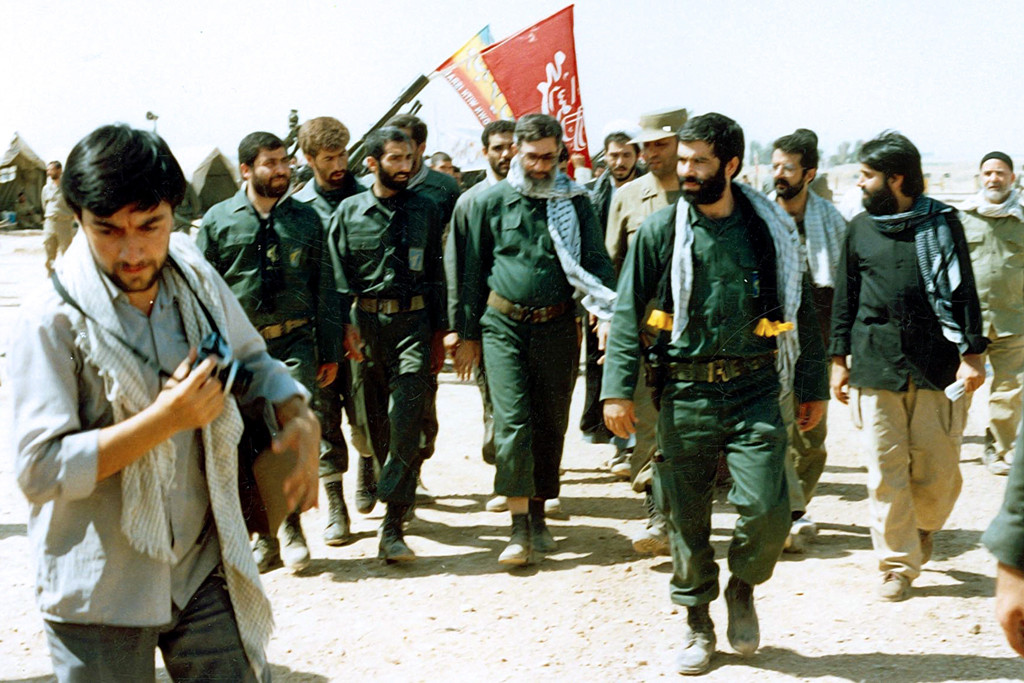
President Ali Khamenei visiting a battlefield during the Iran–Iraq War, August 1988

The IRGC emerged from the 1980–1988 Iran–Iraq War as a largely independent organization, which the clerical leadership relied on. The share of the Iranian military budget allocated to the IRGC in 1980 was 7.3%. This increased to 20.3% by 1982, and then almost 50% by 1987.

=== Lebanon: Civil War and 2006 War (1982–2006) ===
During the Lebanese Civil War, the IRGC allegedly sent troops to train fighters in response to the 1982 Israeli invasion of Lebanon. In Lebanon, political parties had staunch opinions regarding the IRGC's presence. Some, mainly the Christian militias such as the Lebanese Forces, Phalanges, and most of the Christian groups declared war on the IRGC, claiming they violated Lebanese sovereignty. Others, including Muslim militias, were neutral to their presence. Groups such as the PSP and Mourabiton did not approve of their presence but remained silent to preserve political alliances.

During the 2006 Lebanon War, several Iranian Revolutionary Guards were reportedly killed by Israeli forces in Baalbek, a town close to the Syrian border. Israeli officials believe that IRGC forces were responsible for training and equipping the Hezbollah fighters behind the missile attack on the INS Hanit which left four Israeli sailors dead and seriously damaged the vessel.

=== Syrian Civil War (2011–2024) ===
Prior to the Syrian war, Iran had between 2,000 and 3,000 IRGC officers stationed in Syria, helping to train local troops and managing supply routes of arms and money to neighboring Lebanon.

General Qa'ani, commander of the Quds Force, said: "If the Islamic Republic was not present in Syria, the massacre of civilians would have been twice as bad. They had physically and non-physically stopped the rebels from killing many more among the Syrian people."

Iranian Revolutionary Guard soldiers, along with fellow Shi'ite forces from Hezbollah and members of Iran's Basij militia participated in the capture of Qusair from rebel forces on 9 June 2013. In 2014, Iran increased its deployment of IRGC in Syria.

By late 2015, 194 IRGC troops had been killed in Syria; almost all of these soldiers were officers, with several even reaching the rank of Brigadier. Additionally, 354 Afghan combatants had died who were fighting under the command of the IRGC, as part of the IRGC-equipped and trained Fatemiyoun Brigade, which is part of Hezbollah Afghanistan. Another 21 Pakistanis also died as part of the Zainabiyoun Brigade.

The Afghan and Pakistani immigrants volunteered to go to Syria in exchange for salaries and citizenship. The Afghans were recruited largely from refugees inside Iran, and usually had combat experience before joining the IRGC; their status as members of the Iranian military is only vaguely acknowledged and sometimes denied, despite the troops being uniformed fighters led by IRGC officers. They were trained and equipped in Iran, paid salaries by the Iranian military, and received state funerals involving uniformed IRGC personnel. Mid to late October 2015 was particularly bloody for the IRGC, due to them stepping up their involvement in offensives around Aleppo. During this time, 30 IRGC officers, including "three generals, battalion commanders, captains and lieutenants" and "one pilot" were killed in fighting in Syria, as were several Afghan and Pakistani auxiliaries.

The fallen included General Hossein Hamadani, Farshad Hosounizadeh (IRGC colonel and former commander of the Saberin Special Forces Brigade), Mostafa Sadrzadeh (commander of the Omar Battalion of the Fatmiyoon Brigade), and Hamid Mojtaba Mokhtarband (IRGC commander).

=== Iraq (2014–present) ===
Two IRGC battalions were reported to be operating in Iraq against the 2014 Northern Iraq offensive. The IRGC is considered to be a principle backer of the Popular Mobilization Forces, a loose coalition of Shi'a militias allied with the Iraqi government in its fight against the Islamic State of Iraq and Syria (ISIS). Major general Qasem Soleimani was an instrumental force in the Iranian ground mission in Iraq against ISIS, purportedly planning the Second Battle of Tikrit.

In December 2014, brigadier general Hamid Taqavi, a veteran of the 1980–1988 Iran–Iraq War, was killed by snipers in Samarra. In May 2017, Shaaban Nassiri, a senior IRGC commander was killed in combat near Mosul, Iraq. In December 2019, the U.S. Air Force conducted airstrikes on weapons caches and facilities of the IRGC-sponsored militant group Kata'ib Hezbollah. In retaliation, the group attacked the U.S. embassy in Baghdad in the Green Zone.

On 3 January 2020, Soleimani was killed in a U.S. drone strike at Baghdad International Airport along with PMF commander Abu Mahdi al-Muhandis.

=== Russo-Ukrainian war (2022–present) ===
On 21 October 2022, a White House press release stated that Iranian troops were in Crimea assisting Russia in launching drone attacks against civilians and civilian infrastructure. On 24 November, Ukrainian officials said the military had killed 10 Iranians and would target any further Iranian military presence in Ukraine. The Institute for the Study of War assessed that these are likely Islamic Revolutionary Guard Corps or IRGC-affiliated personnel, as this formation is the primary operator of Iranian drones.

=== Direct conflict with Israel (2024–2025) ===
On 13 April 2024, the IRGC, in collaboration with the Islamic Resistance in Iraq, Hezbollah, and the Houthis, launched retaliatory attacks against Israel and the Israeli-occupied Golan Heights with loitering munitions, cruise missiles, and ballistic missiles. It was retaliation for the Israeli bombing of the Iranian embassy in Damascus on 1 April, which killed two Iranian generals. The strike was seen as a spillover of the Gaza war and marked Iran's first direct attack on Israel since the start of their proxy conflict. The attack was the largest attempted drone strike in history, intended to overwhelm anti-aircraft defenses. It was the first time since Iraq's 1991 missile strikes that Israel was directly attacked by a state force.

On 13 June 2025, Israel launched a "preemptive" strike targeting high-ranking members of the Islamic revolution and Iran's nuclear infrastructure and key nuclear scientists. The opening attack killed 30 IRGC generals and nine nuclear scientists. The strike, referred to as Operation Rising Lion, launched the Twelve-Day War. US airstrikes damaged the nuclear facilities at Natanz, Isfahan, and Fordow. Notable IRGC generals killed during the Twelve-Day War include:

- Mohammad Bagheri, chief of staff of the armed forces and the second-highest commander after Ayatollah Khamenei.
- Hossein Salami, commander in chief of the Islamic Revolutionary Guards Corps.
- Gholam Ali Rashid, deputy commander in chief of the Armed Forces.
- Amir Ali Hajizadeh, head of the airspace unit of the Revolutionary Guards.
- Gholamreza Mehrabi, deputy intelligence chief of the Armed Forces.
- Mehdi Rabbani, deputy commander of operations for the Armed Forces.
- Davood Sheikhian, the commander of air defense.
- Khosro Hassani, the deputy intelligence chief of the aerospace unit.
- Mohammad Kazemi, the head of the intelligence
- Hassan Mohaghegh, the deputy to general Kazemi.

=== Other operations and incidents ===
On 7 July 2008, investigative journalist and author Seymour Hersh wrote an article in The New Yorker stating that the Bush administration had signed a presidential finding authorizing the CIA's Special Activities Division to begin cross border paramilitary operations from Iraq and Afghanistan into Iran. These operations would be against the Quds Force, the commando arm of the IRGC that had been blamed for repeated acts of violence in Iraq, and "high-value targets" in the war on terror.

On 24 August 2014, IRGC forces said that they had shot down an Israeli drone approaching the Natanz nuclear facility. According to ISNA, "The downed aircraft was of the stealth, radar-evasive type ... and was targeted by a ground-to-air missile before it managed to enter the area." The IRGC statement did not mention how they recognized it as an Israeli drone. Israel offered no comment.

On 3 February 2021, IRGC announced that it had conducted an intelligence-based operation inside Pakistani territory to rescue two of its border guards who were taken as hostages by Jaish ul-Adl organization two and a half years prior. The Pakistani army denied that Iran had carried out an intelligence operation inside its territory.

== Domestic operations and incidents ==
In January 2006, an IRGC Falcon crashed near Oroumieh, about 560 miles northwest of Tehran, near the Turkish border, Iranian media reported. All fifteen passengers died, including twelve senior IRGC commanders. Among the dead was General Ahmad Kazemi, the IRGC ground forces commander, and Iran–Iraq War veteran. Gen. Masoud Jazayeri, spokesman for the IRGC, told state radio that both of the plane's engines had failed, its landing gear had jammed, and there was snow and poor visibility at the time.

In October 2009, several top commanders of the Revolutionary Guards were killed in a suicide bombing in the Pishin region of Sistan-Baluchistan, in the south-east of Iran. The Iranian state television said 31 people died in the attack, and more than 25 were injured. Shia and Sunni tribal leaders were also killed. The Sunni Baluchi insurgent group Jundullah claimed responsibility for the attack. The Iranian government initially blamed the United States for involvement in the attacks, as well as Saudi Arabia, the United Kingdom and later Pakistan for their alleged support of Jundallah. The United States denied involvement, but some reports of US assistance to Jundallah during the Bush administration have come from Western sources. The attacks appear to have originated in Pakistan and several suspects have been arrested.

Iranian authorities initially denied responsibility for the Ukraine International Airlines Flight 752 incident. However, the IRGC later admitted that the plane had been shot down by mistake. The Aerospace Force of the Islamic Revolutionary Guard Corps took "full responsibility" for mistakenly shooting down the airplane with a surface-to-air missile on 8 January 2020. President Hassan Rouhani stated that it had been approaching an IRGC base. According to a senior commander, the plane was mistaken for a cruise missile. On 17 January 2020, the IRGC were defended by Ali Khamenei in the Friday sermon. He said "Iran's enemies" used the crash and the military's admission to "weaken" the IRGC.

== Influence and activities ==
=== Political ===
As an elite group, members of Pasdaran have an oversized influence in Iran's political world. Mahmoud Ahmadinejad (President 2005–2013) joined the IRGC in 1985, serving first in military operation in Iraqi Kurdistan before leaving the front line to take charge of logistics. A majority of his first cabinet consisted of IRGC veterans. Nearly one third of the members elected to Iran's Majlis in 2004 are also "Pásdárán". Others have been appointed as ambassadors, mayors, provincial governors and senior bureaucrats. However, IRGC veteran status does not imply a single viewpoint.

Strengthening the power of the IRGC was their actions against the Green Movement, where thousands of Iranians protested election irregularities in the 2009 victory of Mahmoud Ahmadinejad over "a well-liked" reformer Mir-Hossein Mousavi. As "the demonstrations gained strength, the security forces swept in, arresting, beating, and killing protesters". The IRGC was thought to be crucial in crushing the movement which "marked a turning point" for the Islamic Republic.

In a video leaked to the internet, then-leader of the Pasdaran, general Mohammad Ali Jafari, opposed the protest for challenging 'the tenets of the revolution', but warned that it 'was a blow that weakened the fundamental pillars of the regime,' and demonstrated that Iran's rulers "could no longer count on popular support". He added, "Anyone who refuses to understand these new conditions will not be successful".

Ayatollah Khomeini urged that the country's military forces should remain unpoliticized. However, the constitution, in Article 150, defines the IRGC as the "guardian of the Revolution and of its achievements" which is at least partly a political mission. His original views have therefore been the subject of debate. Supporters of the Basiji have argued for politicization, while reformists, moderates and Hassan Khomeini opposed it. President Rafsanjani forced military professionalization and ideological deradicalization on the IRGC to curb its political role, but the Pasdaran became natural allies of Supreme Leader Ali Khamenei when reformists threatened him. The IRGC grew stronger under president Ahmedinejad, and assumed formal command of the Basiji militia in early 2009.

Although never explicitly endorsing or affiliating themselves with any political parties, the Alliance of Builders of Islamic Iran (or Abadgaran), is widely viewed as a political front for the Revolutionary Guards. Many former members (including Ahmadinejad) have joined this party in recent years and the Revolutionary Guards have reportedly given them financial support.

During the 2026 Iran war the IRGC became the dominant power in Iran, as Ahmad Vahidi, commander of the IRGC, insisted that all critical and sensitive leadership positions must be decided by the IRGC.

=== Economic activity ===
IRGC first expanded into commercial activity through informal social networking of veterans and former officials. IRGC officials confiscated assets of many refugees who had fled Iran after the fall of Abolhassan Banisadr's government. It is now a vast conglomerate, controlling Iran's missile batteries and nuclear program but also a multibillion-dollar business empire reaching almost all economic sectors. Estimates of the fraction of Iran's economy that it controls through a series of subsidiaries and trusts vary from 10% to over 50%.

The Los Angeles Times estimates that IRGC has ties to over 100 companies, with its annual revenue exceeding $12 billion in business and construction. The IRGC has been awarded billions of dollars in contracts in the oil, gas and petrochemical industries as well as major infrastructure projects.

The following commercial entities have been named by the United States as owned or controlled by the IRGC and its leaders.

- Khatam al-Anbiya Construction Headquarters, the IRGC's major engineering arm & one of Iran's largest contractors employing about 25,000 engineers and staff on military (70%) and non-military (30%) projects worth over $7 billion in 2006.
- Oriental Oil Kish (oil and gas industry)
- Ghorb Nooh
- Sahel Consultant Engineering
- Ghorb Karbala
- Sepasad Engineering Co. (excavation and tunnel construction)
- Omran Sahel
- Hara Company (excavation and tunnel construction)
- Gharargahe Sazandegi Ghaem
- Imensazan Consultant Engineers Institute (subsidiary of Khatam al-Anbiya Construction Headquarters)
- Fater Engineering Institute (subsidiary of Khatam al-Anbiya Construction Headquarters)

In September 2009, the government of Iran sold 51% of the shares of the Telecommunication Company of Iran to the Mobin Trust Consortium (Etemad-e-Mobin), a group affiliated with the Guards, for $7.8 billion. This was the largest transaction on the Tehran Stock Exchange in history. IRGC also owns 45% participation in the automotive Bahman Group and has a majority stake in Iran's naval giant SADRA through Khatam al-Anbiya Construction Headquarters.

The IRGC also exerts influence over bonyads, wealthy, non-governmental ostensibly charitable foundations controlled by key clerics. The pattern of revolutionary foundations mimics the style of informal and extralegal economic networks from the time of the shah. Their development started in the early 1990s, gathered pace over the next decade, and accelerated even more with many lucrative no-bid contracts from the Ahmadinejad presidency. The IRGC exerts informal, but real, influence over many such organizations including:

- Mostazafan Foundation (Foundation of the Oppressed or The Mostazafan Foundation)
- Bonyad Shahid va Omur-e Janbazan (Foundation of Martyrs and Veterans Affairs)

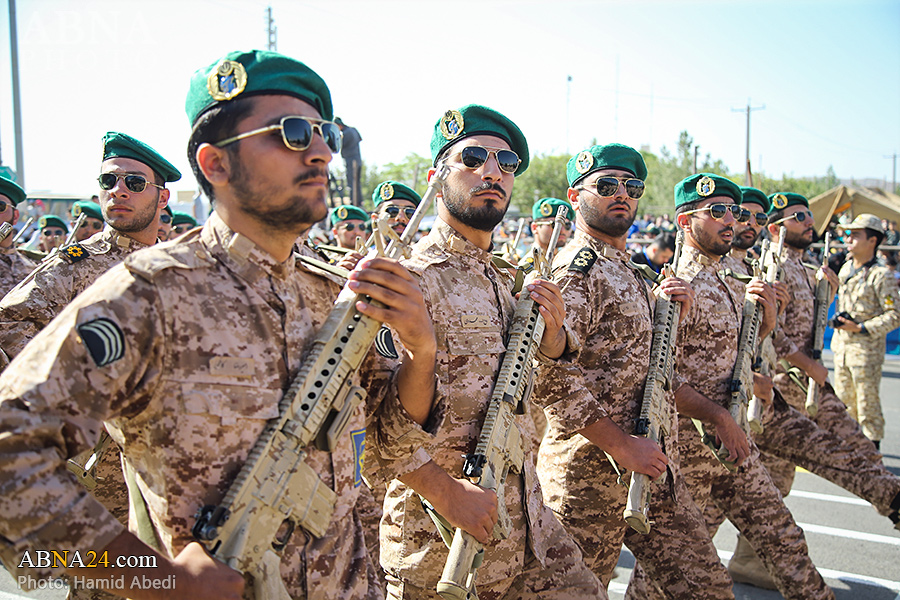
Military parade in Qom, Iran, commemorating Sacred Defence Week, 22 September 2023

As an elite force with great economic assets it has developed into what some observers call an "untouchable élite" and somewhat isolated in Iranian society. According to a "former senior Middle Eastern intelligence officer", the Guard and their families "have their own schools, their own markets, their own neighborhoods, their own resorts. The neighborhoods look like a carbon copy of Beverly Hills."

Former Bank Ansar and Bank Mehr Iranian were run by IRGC Cooperation Bonyad until their merger with state Bank Sepah.

In 2023, Israel seized millions of dollars in cryptocurrency belonging to Hezbollah and the IRGC's Quds Force.

Between 2023 and 2025, Iran significantly increased its military budget, with a substantial portion directed to the IRGC. In 2023, Iran's military expenditure was estimated at $10.3 billion, with the IRGC receiving approximately 37%, approximately $3.8 billion. By 2024, the total military budget rose to approximately $16.7 billion, with $10.9 billion officially allocated to military entities and an additional $5.9 billion channeled through oil revenues and the National Development Fund. In 2025, the Iranian government proposed a 200% increase in the military budget, allocating over half of its oil and gas export revenues—estimated at €12 billion—to the armed forces, including the IRGC. This surge in funding underscores Iran's focus on enhancing its military capabilities amid escalating regional tensions.

=== Environmental ===
Since the 1979 Islamic Revolution, Iran's pursuit of food self-sufficiency has driven a state-led campaign of agricultural expansion that has severely strained the country's limited water resources. This push, heavily reliant on water-intensive crops such as wheat, rice, and sugar beet, has often ignored ecological constraints. With agriculture accounting for approximately 92% of water usage and among the lowest levels of water productivity in the region, Iran's water crisis is deeply entwined with governance failures, ideological policies, and entrenched institutional interests.

The Islamic Revolutionary Guard Corps, who holds a deep entanglement in Iran's economic, infrastructural, and environmental governance, has had a significant effect on Iran's environmental standing. Through its engineering arm, Khatam al-Anbiya Construction Headquarters (KAA), the IRGC has been a principal actor in Iran's dam-building spree, water transfer schemes, and large-scale infrastructure projects. Peripheral provinces such as Khuzestan, which are home to marginalized ethnic communities, have suffered disproportionately from these ecological disruptions.

The IRGC and its affiliated economic networks, sometimes referred to as the "water mafia," have profited immensely from this system. While the official rhetoric remains fixated on sovereignty and resistance economics, the practical outcome has been a politicized water economy marked by mismanagement and corruption. The Majlis Research Center itself acknowledged in 2023 that the current model of water governance is incompatible with the country's hydrological realities.

=== Analysis ===
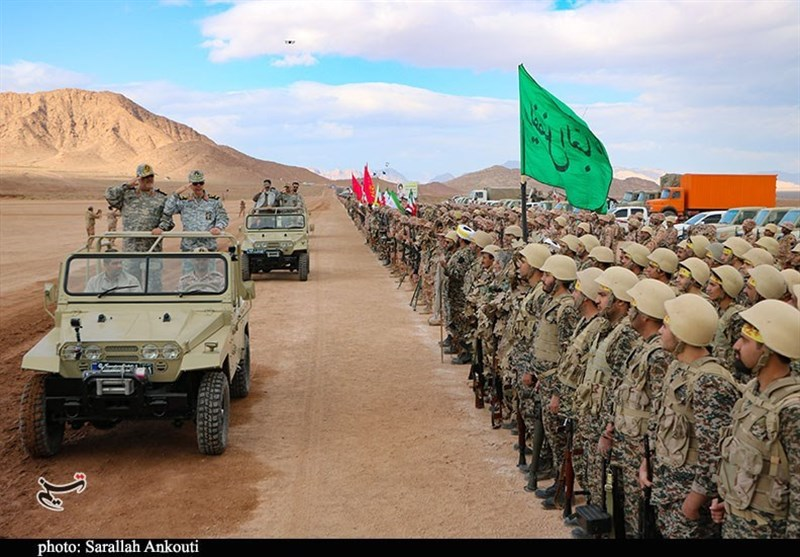
Tactical exercise of the IRGC Ground Force in Kerman, Iran, 21 November 2023

Mehdi Khalaji of the Washington Institute for Near East Policy argues that the IRGC is "the spine of the current political structure and a major player in the Iranian economy." The once theocratic state has evolved into a garrison state, like Burma, whereby the military dominates social, cultural, political, and economic life, protecting the government from internal rather than external opponents.

Greg Bruno and Jayshree Bajoria of the Council on Foreign Relations agree, stating that the IRGC has expanded well beyond its mandate and into a "socio-military-political-economic force" that deeply penetrates Iran's power structure. "The Guards' involvement in politics has grown to unprecedented levels since 2004, when IRGC won at least 16 percent of the 290 seats" in the Islamic Consultative Assembly of Iran. During the elections of March 2008, IRGC veterans won 182 out of 290 seats, helping Mahmoud Ahmadinejad consolidate power.

Half of Ahmadinejad's cabinet was composed of former IRGC officers while several others were appointed to provincial governorships.

Ali Alfoneh of the American Enterprise Institute contends that "While the presence of former IRGC officers in the cabinet is not a new phenomenon, their numbers under Ahmadinejad—they occupy nine of the twenty-one ministry portfolios—are unprecedented." Additionally, Ahmadinejad successfully purged provincial governorships of Rafsanjani and Khatami supporters and replaced them not only with IRGC members, but also members of the Basij and the Islamic Republic prison administration.

The IRGC chief, General Mohammad Ali Jafari, announced that the Guards would go through internal restructuring in order to counter "internal threats to the Islamic Republic." Bruce Riedel, a Senior Fellow at the Brookings Institution and former CIA analyst, argues the Guards was created to protect the government against a possible coup.

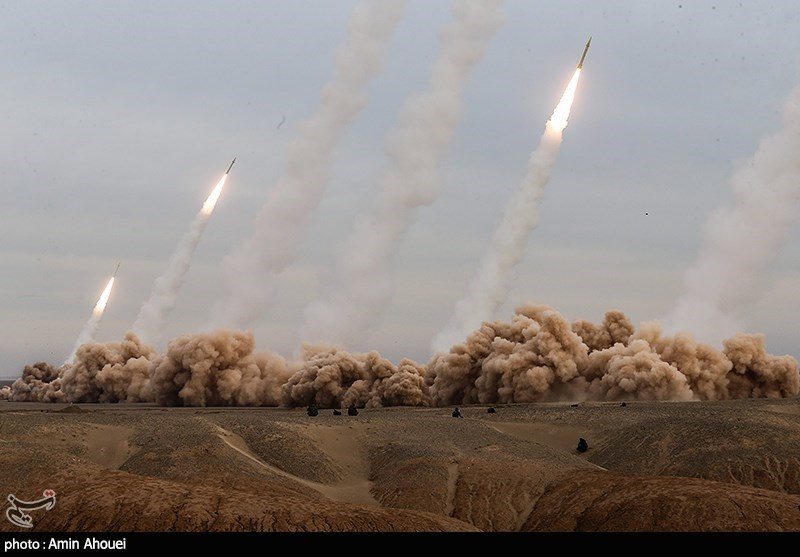
IRGC launching ballistic missiles during the final stage of the "Great Prophet 17" joint military exercise, 24 December 2021

Since the disputed 2009 presidential elections, debate over how powerful the IRGC is has reemerged. Danielle Pletka and Ali Alfoneh see the irreversible militarization of Iran's government. Abbas Milani, director of Iranian Studies at Stanford University, believes the Guards' power actually exceeds that of Supreme Leader Ayatollah Ali Khamenei. Frederic Wehrey, adjunct Senior Fellow at the RAND Corporation believes the Revolutionary Guards is not a cohesive unit of similar-minded conservatives but rather a factionalized institution that is hardly bent on overthrowing their masters.

=== U.S. Department of the Treasury terrorist aid claims ===
The U.S. Department of the Treasury claims the Corp has supported several organizations the U.S. deems to be terrorist, including Hezbollah, Hamas, Palestinian Islamic Jihad (PIJ), the Popular Front for the Liberation of Palestine – General Command (PFLP-GC), and the Taliban. In the U.S. Department of the Treasury's report, four IRGC senior officials, Hushang Alladad, Hossein Musavi, Hasan Mortezavi, and Mohammad Reza Zahedi, were specifically named for providing support to terrorist organizations. Hushang Alladad, a financial officer for the IRGC, was cited as personally administering financial support to terrorist groups including Hizballah, Hamas, and PIJ.

Both General Hossein Musavi and Colonel Hasan Mortevazi were claimed to have provided financial and material support to the Taliban. Mohammad Reza Zahedi, the IRGC commander in Lebanon, was claimed to have played a crucial role in Iran's aid to Hizballah. According to the U.S. Department of the Treasury, Zahedi served as a liaison to Hizballah and Syrian intelligence services as well as taking part in weapon deals involving Hizballah.

The U.S. Treasury report goes on to detail the IRGC's methods of support for terrorist groups: "The Government of Iran also uses the Islamic Revolutionary Guard Corps (IRGC) and IRGC-QF to implement its foreign policy goals, including, but not limited to, seemingly legitimate activities that provide cover for intelligence operations and support to terrorist and insurgent groups. These activities include economic investment, reconstruction, and other types of aid to Iraq, Afghanistan, and Lebanon, implemented by companies and institutions that act for or on behalf of, or are owned or controlled by the IRGC and the Iranian government."

=== Mass media ===
During the Iran-Iraq War, the IRGC developed an extensive media and cultural production apparatus as part of its broader ideological activities. Contemporary reports indicated that as much as "90 percent" of its non-combat operations were devoted to such "cultural activities", aimed at promoting the religious and political values endorsed by the organization and allied clerical figures. IRGC units organized the production and distribution of both textual and audio-visual materials. According to internal reports from the early 1980s, the organization established over 2,400 libraries across major provinces. Within these and existing libraries, approximately 629,102 books were donated, and a further 482,000 books were distributed nationwide. In addition, IRGC units produced around 440,000 publications, excluding political journals. While many of these materials were distributed free of charge, others were sold, generating approximately 9.75 million rials in revenue, including 3 million rials from sales in southwestern provinces affected by the war. Some ideological and political publications were also distributed to "liberation fronts" outside Iran. The IRGC also invested in audio-visual and artistic production. This included organizing 4,049 film screenings and producing 85 theatrical performances. Provincial units distributed nearly 60,000 audio cassettes covering religious themes, including approximately 6,000 excerpts from the Qur'an and 3,000 recordings related to Guardianship of the Jurist. The most widely distributed cassette, numbering 21,000 copies, featured sermons by Ayatollah Morteza Motahhari. These materials were disseminated through local bases and public exhibitions; in total, 1,620 exhibitions were held, where books and cassettes were sold and accompanied by slideshow presentations.

The IRGC also operates affiliated media organizations, including Owj Arts and Media Organization and Tasnim News Agency.

=== Similar organizations ===
Since November 2023, the military of Islamic Emirate have created Supreme leader-led task forces in Afghanistan similar to the Revolutionary Guard.

== Controversy ==
From its origin as an ideologically driven militia, the IRGC has taken an ever more assertive role in virtually every aspect of Iranian society. Its part in suppressing dissent has led many analysts to describe the events surrounding the 12 June 2009 presidential election as a military coup, and the IRGC as an authoritarian military security government for which its Shiite clerical system is no more than a facade.

Since its establishment, IRGC has been involved in many economic and military activities, of which some raised controversies. The organization has been accused of smuggling (including importing illegal alcoholic beverages, cigarettes and satellite dishes, into Iran via jetties not supervised by the Government), training and supplying Hezbollah and Hamas fighters, and of being involved in the Iraq War.

In December 2009, evidence uncovered during an investigation by the Guardian newspaper and Guardian Films linked the IRGC to the kidnappings of 5 Britons from a government ministry building in Baghdad in 2007. Three of the hostages, Jason Creswell, Jason Swindlehurst and Alec Maclachlan, were killed. Alan Mcmenemy's body was never found but Peter Moore was released on 30 December 2009. The investigation uncovered evidence that Moore, 37, a computer expert from Lincoln was targeted because he was installing a system for the Iraqi Government that would show how a vast amount of international aid was diverted to Iran's militia groups in Iraq.

According to Geneive Abdo, IRGC members were appointed "as ambassadors, mayors, cabinet ministers, and high-ranking officials at state-run economic institutions" during the administration of president Ahmadinejad. Appointments in 2009 by Supreme Leader Ali Khamenei have given "hard-liners" in the guard "unprecedented power" and included "some of the most feared and brutal men in Iran."

In May 2019, the United States accused the IRGC of being "directly responsible" for an attack on commercial ships in the Gulf of Oman. Michael M. Gilday, United States director of the Joint Staff, described US intelligence attributing that the IRGC used limpet mines to attack four oil tankers anchored in the Gulf of Oman for bunkering through the Port of Fujairah.

In April 2020, during the COVID-19 pandemic, the IRGC unveiled the Mostaan 110, an experimental medical device that the IRGC claimed could detect instances of COVID-19 using electromagnetic radiation. The IRGC's claims of Mostaan 110's capabilities were met with widespread criticism from both Iranian and international experts, who called it pseudoscientific and compared it to the ADE 651, a fake explosive detector with a similar design.

In December 2022, German authorities accused the IRGC of attempting to orchestrate attacks against synagogues in the state of North Rhine-Westphalia and spying on the president of the Central Council of Jews in Germany. Moreover, in 2020, IRGC members were exposed as having given a talk to UK students in which one spoke of an apocalyptic war with Jews.

In July 2024, it was suspected that the IRGC had attempted to assassinate the former Iranian president, Mahmoud Ahmadinejad.

Following the 2026 Iran massacres, the Kaveh organization was founded to form resistance against IRGC members.

=== Terrorist designation and sanction ===
Iran Designated IRGC as a terrorist organization

Since 15 April 2019, the United States, which opposes the activities of Sepah, considers the IRGC as a terrorist organization, which some top CIA and Pentagon officials reportedly opposed. On 8 April, Israeli Prime Minister Benjamin Netanyahu tweeted in Hebrew that America's terrorist designation was the fulfillment of "another important request of mine." This designation was criticized by a number of governments including Turkey, Iraq and China as well as the Islamic Consultative Assembly, Iran's parliament, in which members wore IRGC uniforms in protest.

On 29 April 2019, United States Deputy Assistant Secretary of Defense Michael Mulroy said Iran posed five threats. The first was Iran obtaining a nuclear weapon. The second was to maritime security in the Straits of Hormuz and the Bab al-Mandab, because a substantial portion of energy trade and commercial goods go through those areas. The third was because of their support to proxies and militant organizations, including Hezbollah in Lebanon and Syria, Houthis in Yemen, some Hashd al-Shaabi in Iraq and safe-harboring senior al-Qaeda leaders in Iran. The fourth was Iranian made ballistic missiles sent to Houthi-controlled areas of Yemen for use against Saudi Arabia and to Syria with Hezbollah to use against Israel. Cyber is the fifth threat and a growing concern. He also said that the terrorist designation did not grant any additional authorities to the Department of Defense and that they were not asking for any.

The IRGC has never been designated as a terrorist organization by the United Nations, although the UNSCR 1929 had its assets frozen (this was lifted in 2016). Since 2010, the European Union has imposed broad sanctions on the IRGC and many of its members, without designating it as a terrorist organization.

Although Saudi Arabia and Bahrain already designated the IRGC as a terrorist organisation, several countries such as Australia are examining the possibility to designate the group as well. Canada outlawed the Quds Force in 2012. On 3 October 2022, in reaction to the death of Mahsa Amini and the persecution of protestors in the protests that ensued, Canada officially sanctioned the IRGC. Foreign Affairs Minister Mélanie Joly announced sanctions targeting 9 entities, including the Morality Police and the Iranian Ministry of Intelligence and Security, and 25 individuals, that include high-ranking officials and members of the Islamic Revolutionary Guard Corps. These individuals include IRGC Commander-in-Chief Major General Hossein Salami, and Esmail Qaani, commander of the Quds Force of the IRGC.

On 7 October 2022, the Canadian government expanded the sanctions, banning 10,000 members of the Islamic Revolutionary Guard Corps from entering the country permanently, which represents the top 50% of the organization's leadership. Canadian Prime Minister Justin Trudeau added that Canada plans to expand the sanctions against those most responsible for Iran's "egregious behavior". Canadian Deputy Prime Minister Chrystia Freeland added that Iran was a "state sponsor of terror", and that "it is oppressive, theocratic and misogynist; The IRGC leadership are terrorists, the IRGC is a terrorist organization".

According to Arab News, a 2020 report by the Tony Blair Institute for Global Change said that the Islamic Revolutionary Guard Corps is an "institutionalized militia" that "uses its vast resources to spread a 'mission of jihad' through an 'ideological army' of recruits and proxies". In 2022, U.S. Secretary of State Antony Blinken said that the IRGC is "probably the most designated organisation – one way or another – in the world among the organisations that we designate, including the foreign terrorist organisation designation".

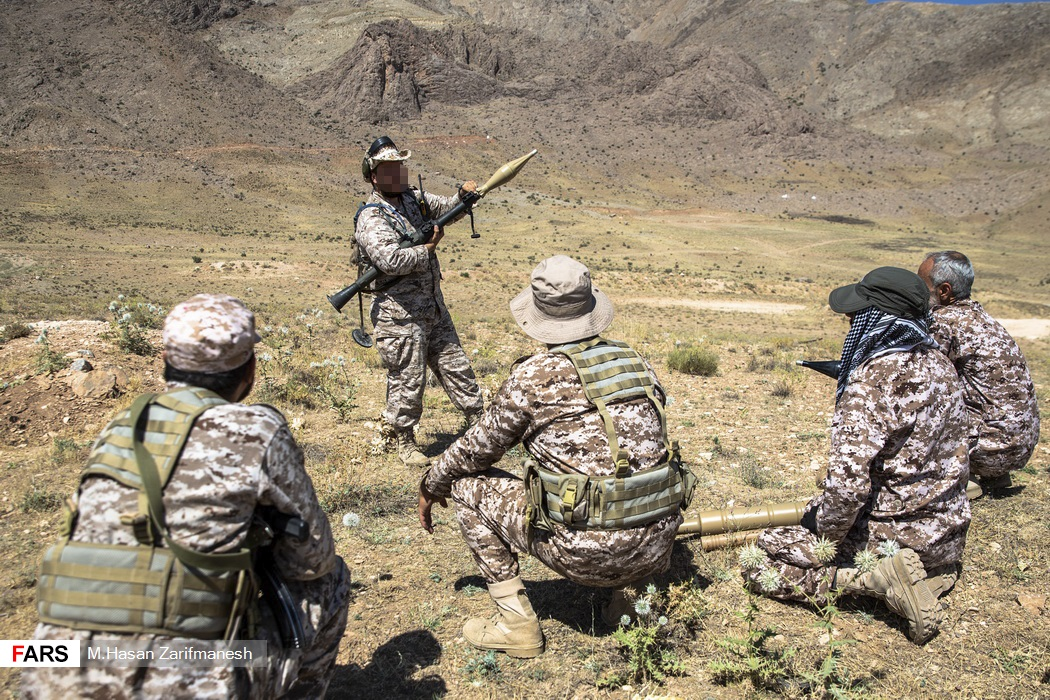
Heydar Karar Battalion of the Fatehin Special Unit conducting training in Damavand, 4 September 2021

In January 2023, it was reported that the United Kingdom was preparing to declare the IRGC a terrorist organization; this did not subsequently occur. On 18 January 2023, the European Parliament passed an amendment proposed by the ECR Group, to call for the EU and its member states to include the IRGC on the EU's terrorist list.

On 19 June 2024, Canada designated the IRGC as a terrorist organization under the nation's Criminal Code, citing "disregard for human rights" and "willingness to destabilize the international rules-based order."

In March 2025, the United States reportedly requested the new transitional administration in Syria to designate the IRGC as a terrorist organization as a condition for partial sanctions relief. On 25 April 2025, Paraguay designated the IRGC as a terrorist organization.

On 26 August 2025, Australia indicated that it would designate the IRGC as a terrorist organization, pending legislation. This followed attacks on Jewish sites in Australia which the Australian Security Intelligence Organisation determined were directed by the IRGC. On 16 September 2025, Ecuador designated the IRGC as a terrorist organization alongside Hamas and Hezbollah, citing threats to Ecuador's sovereignty and national security.

On 27 November 2025, the Parliament of Australia formally listed the Islamic Revolutionary Guard Corps as a State Sponsor of Terrorism, under the framework of the Criminal Code Amendment (State Sponsors of Terrorism) Act 2025. The IRGC was the first entity to be designated as such, after the Minister of Home Affairs determined that it met the criteria specified in Division 110 of the code, thereby following the recommendations of Australian Government intelligence, security and policy agencies. According to the listing, it is "illegal to direct the activities of, be a member of, associate with members of, recruit for, train with, get funds to, from or for, or provide support to, the Iranian Revolutionary Guard Corp", with a penalty of 25 years of imprisonment.

On 17 January 2026, Argentina designated the IRGC Quds Force as terrorist organization. The decree was signed by President Javier Milei. On 22 January 2026, the European Union called for the designation of the IRGC as a terrorist organization and advocated for further sanctions, in response to Iran's violent crackdown and massacres against the 2025–2026 Iranian protests. A few days later, France said it would back the designation, marking a reversal of its earlier position. On 29 January 2026, the EU designated the IRGC as a terrorist organization. Following the European Union's decision to proscribe the IRGC, the United Kingdom is set to follow suit. Ukraine also followed suit on 2 February 2026, citing Iran's crackdown on protestors and Iranian support for the Russian invasion of Ukraine by providing Shahed drones. Eight European countries including Albania, Bosnia and Herzegovina, Iceland, Liechtenstein, Moldova, Montenegro, North Macedonia, and Serbia followed suit in mid-March 2026 aligning with the EU decisions after consultations with the Israeli foreign ministry.

On 5 March 2026, Lebanon banned the IRGC from operating within its territory, and stated that its members would face deportation. On 1 April 2026, Argentina designated the IRGC as a terrorist organization. Local officials said that this measure follows the IRGC’s alleged links to militant group Hezbollah, which Argentina accuses of carrying out the 1992 Israeli embassy bombing in Buenos Aires (killing 29 and injuring more than 200 individuals), and the 1994 bombing of the Asociacion Mutual Israelita Argentina Jewish community center- the deadliest terrorist attack in Argentina’s history.

On 8 April 2026, Costa Rica designated the IRGC as a terrorist organization. On 15 April 2026, Trinidad and Tobago designated the IRGC as a terrorist organization. On 24 April 2026, Prime Minister of United Kingdom Keir Starmer promised in an interview with the Jewish Chronicle to proscribe the IRGC by July 2026, which was then done using the new powers granted by the National Security (State Threats) Act 2026. On 24 September 2026, Colombia designated the IRGC as a terrorist organization.

=== Response to terrorist organization designation ===
The move was met with unfavorable reactions from Iranian leaders and militants. Shortly after the US announced the designation, the Iranian government declared the United States Central Command, whose area of responsibility includes the Middle East, as a terrorist organization. According to Iran's Supreme National Security Council, the move "was in response to the illegal and unwise move from the U.S." The next day, Iranian Members of Parliament displayed their support of the IRGC by collectively wearing green military pants and chanted "death to America" as they opened session. Iranian president Hassan Rouhani also responded to the move, commenting that it was a mistake which would only increase the IRGC's popularity in Iran and elsewhere.

Since the designation, the United States Department of State's Rewards for Justice Program has offered a reward of up to US$15 million for financial background information about the Islamic Revolutionary Guard Corps and its branches, including an IRGC financier, Abdul Reza Shahlai, (Note: The United States unsuccessfully targeted Abdul Reza Shahlai in Yemen on the same day of assassination of Qasem Soleimani, which led to the death of Mohammad Mirza, a Quds Force operative, instead.) who it says was responsible for a raid that killed five American soldiers in Karbala, Iraq on 20 January 2007.

Following Canada's designation of the IRGC as a terrorist organization, Iran strongly condemned the move. As a result, the Foreign Ministry summoned the Italian ambassador in Tehran, who represents Canadian interests in the country. In a statement, the ministry expressed Iran's "strong protest" over what it described as an "unlawful and internationally illegal" act by the Canadian government. The statement also warned of potential consequences and emphasized Iran's right to take necessary and reciprocal measures. According to the ministry, the Italian ambassador pledged to promptly convey the message to Canadian authorities. Spokesperson Nasser Kanaani called the move "hostile" and contrary to international law while the acting foreign minister Ali Bagheri said on X that the Canadian government will be responsible for the consequences of this provocative and irresponsible decision, referring to the designation.

== See also ==
- Composite Index of National Capability
- Economic activities of the Iranian Revolutionary Guard Corps
- Iran's ballistic missiles program
- Iranian external operations
- Islamic Republic of Iran Army
- Ministry of Revolutionary Guards
- Operations attributed to Israel in Iran
- Pasdar (IRGC)
- Rahian-e Noor
  - Research and Self-Sufficiency Jihad Organization
- Unit 840
