= Economic activities of the Iranian Revolutionary Guard Corps =

The Islamic Revolutionary Guard Corps (IRGC) has extended its influence into vast economic sectors, controlling everything from construction to agriculture, often bypassing formal regulations and generating revenue through black-market activities. These economic practices enable the regime to bolster its legitimacy, support the military, and suppress opposition, all while maintaining control over vital resources such as food and water.

== Background: Autocracies and control over the economy ==
According to Freedom House, Iran is considered to be a "not free" country, where the ultimate power rests in the hands of the country's supreme leader, Ayatollah Mojtaba Khamenei, and the unelected institutions under his control. The United States Department of State defines Iran as a theocracy governed by an autocratic regime.

An autocrat exerts control over the populace through the military, police, and secret services, yet cannot wield the same level of influence over these forces themselves. To preserve his life and regime, a dictator must secure the loyalty of the military and security forces, as the majority of successful coups are not the result of spontaneous popular uprisings but are instead led by high-ranking officers. To preempt a coup that could cost him and his family their lives, dictators suppress dissent, outlaw political competition, heavily restrict freedom of expression, and ban all criticism of the government. However, repression can act as a double-edged sword. On the one hand, it instills fear in the populace, making it more challenging to organize subversive movements; on the other, it obscures the truth about the dictator's actual support among the people. Even the dictator's closest advisors often hesitate to relay unpleasant truths, leaving the ruler in an insulated bubble.

Given this mutual signaling problem between the dictator and his subjects, the dictator garners the support and loyalty of the state's power centers—especially the military and police—by granting them generous benefits. In a dictatorship, those controlling these power centers typically receive benefits that far exceed their economic contribution, while others receive less than they contribute. For instance, senior officials in the Soviet Union enjoyed spacious homes and a lifestyle beyond the reach of ordinary citizens. In Nazi Germany, Hitler—who arrived in Germany as a destitute vagrant from Austria—amassed a considerable personal fortune and used state funds as if they were his own. He also granted estates and properties to military personnel and high-ranking officials within Germany's power structure. Additionally, Hitler secured the loyalty of German industrialists by controlling government contracts. Between January and March 1933, companies with strong connections to the Nazi Party saw their profits rise 5%–8% more than similar companies lacking such connections.

In Egypt, a similar system is in place, where the military functions not only as an armed force but as an economic empire, owning factories, schools, residential buildings, and more. Similar patterns are observed across other African countries. Hodler and Raschky (2014) noted that in such regimes, investments in education and healthcare are often directed towards regions inhabited by the ruler's tribe or ethnically close populations. Similarly, Franck and Rainer (2012) found that African leaders in sub-Saharan countries tend to improve health and education outcomes primarily within their ethnic groups.

As Machiavelli observed in his book The Prince, a wise ruler not only secures the loyalty of power centers but also seeks to win the support of the people. One common strategy among dictators for achieving this is through a personality cult. For example, in his book Hitler's Willing Executioners: Ordinary Germans and the Holocaust Daniel Goldhagen writes that Hitler was able to neutralize internal opposition despite having a relatively small paid secret police force, relying instead on informal informants who reported dissenters out of admiration for him in his early years. Moreover, dictators often gain popularity the longer they remain in power.

== The IRGC Economic Apparatus ==
In Iran, the Islamic Revolutionary Guard Corps (IRGC) has developed from a purely military entity into a vast business conglomerate, controlling numerous sectors within the Iranian economy. The RAND report, "The Rise of the Pasdaran", and the Janes report detail this transformation, illustrating how the IRGC has become a dominant economic and political player within Iran. The report attributes the IRGC's rise to a combination of informal social networks, state-sanctioned monopolistic practices, and its exploitation of Iran's geopolitical and economic circumstances. The IRGC has capitalized on various post-revolutionary factors, including wartime reconstruction, to expand its business activities across sectors such as oil, construction, engineering, manufacturing, and agriculture. This expansion not only secures significant revenue but also serves to build a loyal base among Iran's poorer, rural population.

== Origins and Institutional Growth ==
The IRGC's move into economic ventures began shortly after the Iran-Iraq War when Supreme Leader Ayatollah Khamenei formalized a hierarchical structure that paved the way for privileges and economic perks for the country leadership. The IRGC's expansion accelerated during the 1990s under President Rafsanjani, who pushed for government institutions to engage in economic activities to improve the state budget. By the late 1990s, the IRGC's commercial interests were firmly established, and grew rapidly, especially during Mahmoud Ahmadinejad's presidency (2005–2013). Ahmadinejad's government granted numerous no-bid contracts to IRGC-linked companies, particularly in critical sectors like oil extraction and pipeline construction, effectively creating a protected monopoly for the organization.

== Foundations and Bonyads ==
Integral to the IRGC's economic reach are Iran's bonyads, or parastatal foundations, that manage vast resources and assets. While not directly managed by the IRGC, major bonyads such as the Bonyad Mostazafan and the Bonyad Shahid maintain close ties with the organization. The Bonyad Mostazafan, for example, controls extensive resources in agriculture, tourism, and industry, while the Bonyad Shahid (Foundation of Martyrs and Veterans Affairs) primarily supports families of war veterans and martyrs, aligning itself with IRGC interests. Through these bonyads, the IRGC maintains influence over many sectors of Iran's economy, solidifying its power and securing revenue streams that often bypass public oversight and accountability. The IRGC's connection to these charitable foundations helps it sustain public legitimacy by presenting itself as an institution committed to social welfare and economic development.

== Khatam al-Anbiya and Public Works ==
A crucial pillar of the IRGC's economic operations is the Khatam al-Anbiya Construction Headquarters. This organization, established to manage reconstruction projects after the war, has since become Iran's largest engineering and development contractor. Khatam al-Anbiya, with its vast resources and thousands of employees, controls significant infrastructure projects, including the construction of pipelines, roads, dams, and urban transportation networks. Its largest projects are often awarded by the state without competitive bidding, allowing it to maintain a monopoly over critical infrastructure and energy projects. For instance, Khatam al-Anbiya was awarded a $1.3 billion no-bid contract to build a gas pipeline from Asaluyeh to Iranshahr and several billion-dollar contracts for work in the Pars South oil field. These projects not only provide lucrative financial returns for the IRGC but also reinforce its social influence by generating employment in rural areas and aligning its operations with broader development goals. The Basij, a volunteer militia under the IRGC, supports many of these projects, enhancing the IRGC's reputation as a champion of rural economic growth. By investing in rural areas, the IRGC secures grassroots support, using development projects as a means of integrating local populations into its patronage networks.

== Black Market and Illicit Operations ==
In addition to formal economic activities, the IRGC is widely believed to control a vast black market economy. Accusations from reformist political figures, such as Mehdi Karrubi, claim that the IRGC operates numerous unofficial ports, or "invisible jetties," where it facilitates the import and export of contraband. Allegedly, these illegal networks allow the IRGC to smuggle banned items—such as alcohol and narcotics—and to make substantial profits on untaxed goods. Some estimates suggest that these black-market activities may contribute billions to the IRGC's annual revenue. Despite the lack of concrete evidence, the IRGC's access to unmonitored borders and coastal facilities provides the necessary infrastructure for such activities. These operations feed into the IRGC's shadow economy, offering an avenue for unofficial revenue that supports not only the personal wealth of its leaders but also military initiatives and strategic goals, including its nuclear research and support for regional allies.

== Public Perception and Socio-Political Influence ==
The IRGC's dominance over Iran's economy and its extensive patronage networks have, thus far, shielded it from widespread public scrutiny. Many Iranians remain unaware of the extent of the IRGC's control over the economy, partly due to the organization's secretive handling of its business affairs. By monopolizing the economy, the IRGC has managed to maintain some public support, particularly among lower-income and rural populations who benefit from its development projects. However, resentment among traditional business elites and private contractors is growing, especially when these groups are sidelined by the IRGC's monopoly on lucrative government contracts. Some business owners complain that they cannot compete with IRGC-affiliated firms that enjoy advantages such as access to conscript labor, military equipment, and state funds. The IRGC has increasingly justified its economic dominance by citing the Iranian constitution, which allows military entities to engage in economic activities during peacetime. IRGC officials often claim that their business ventures benefit ordinary Iranians, emphasizing the lower cost of IRGC services and their efficiency in delivering public projects. Nevertheless, the IRGC's vast business empire and monopolistic practices have sparked criticism and concerns about its unchecked power, especially as it shifts closer to a political counterforce within the state. For instance, the IRGC's interference in the management of the Imam Khomeini Airport, when it forced out a Turkish contractor to take control of operations, highlights its willingness to leverage economic power for political gain.

== The IRGC and US sanction ==
As sanctions restrict Iran's access to international markets, the IRGC, with its extensive control over smuggling networks and black-market operations, is poised to dominate the economy further. This consolidation of economic power enhances the IRGC's influence within Iran, undermining the sanctions' intended effect of weakening the regime.

== The IRGC and Syria ==
Iran's Islamic Revolutionary Guard Corps (IRGC) is significantly expanding its economic influence in Syria through a series of strategic agreements with the Assad regime. These deals grant Iran control over key sectors, including telecommunications, agriculture, and mining. Notably, Iran has secured a license to operate a mobile phone service in Syria and access to phosphate mining in the country's eastern regions. Additionally, Iran will receive 5,000 hectares for agricultural projects and 1,000 hectares for oil and gas terminals. These agreements are seen as compensation for Iran's military and financial support to Assad during the Syrian civil war. However, Syrian opposition groups have condemned these deals, labeling them as exploitation of Syria's resources by foreign forces.

== The IRGC and Corruption in Water Management ==
Iran suffers from a severe water crisis. According to the World Resources Institute (WRI). Iran ranks among the most water-stressed countries in the world. The country falls under the "extremely high" category on the Water Stress Index, where 80% to 100% of renewable water resources are withdrawn annually. This means Iran is utilizing nearly all of its available water supply for agriculture, industry, and domestic use, leaving little to no buffer for periods of drought or variability in rainfall.

The IRGC and other politically connected entities control water resources, prioritizing projects for political and economic gain rather than public need. They divert supplies to favored regions, causing shortages in vulnerable provinces like Khuzestan and Sistan-Baluchestan. For example, water diversion projects in Isfahan and Yazd provinces received priority despite critical shortages in Khuzestan and Sistan-Baluchestan. Reports also indicate that certain agricultural and industrial enterprises with ties to the Iranian Revolutionary Guard Corps (IRGC) have received significant amounts of water, while small farmers and rural communities struggle with severe shortages.

The IRGC, through its construction arm Khatam al-Anbiya, monopolizes Iran's water management. This "water mafia" controls major infrastructure projects like dam construction, prioritizing financial and political gains over environmental and social considerations. The IRGC's influence leads to inefficient water distribution, ecological damage, and widespread public unrest, particularly in marginalized areas. Their dominance undermines sustainable water policies, contributing to Iran's ongoing water crisis and highlighting the complex interplay between power, corruption, and resource management.

Iran's central government prioritizes water allocation for industrial and urban centers, often at the expense of rural and minority populations. These groups face severe water shortages, ecological degradation, and a loss of livelihoods. This pattern of unequal development not only exacerbates regional disparities but also fuels social unrest and environmental crises. Iran's water policy is also characterized by an overreliance on dam construction and large-scale diversion projects, primarily benefiting politically connected enterprises and urban elites. This has led to the drying of rivers, wetlands, and other vital ecosystems, intensifying dust storms and land subsidence in regions like Khuzestan and Sistan-Baluchestan. Such environmental degradation, combined with insufficient governmental oversight and transparency, worsens living conditions for marginalized communities, reinforcing cycles of poverty and socio-political marginalization.

The consequences of corruption in Iran's water sector extend beyond misallocation and mismanagement. The environmental damage includes the drying of critical water bodies, such as Lake Urmia, which has shrunk by over 80% due to diversion projects and the construction of dams without proper environmental assessments. Such ecological damage affects biodiversity and threatens agricultural productivity, as salinization renders once-fertile land unusable.

== The IRGC and Food Inflation ==
Iran has faced severe food inflation in the past decade. A major contributing factor is the involvement of the Iranian Revolutionary Guard Corps (IRGC) in the economy, particularly in the agriculture and food and water sectors. The IRGC's influence has been linked to mismanagement and corruption, exacerbating problems in water resources, agricultural practices, and food production.

== Food Chain Supply Problems and the IRGC. ==
The Islamic Revolutionary Guard Corps (IRGC) plays a significant role in Iran's economy and particularly in Iran's food supply chain. The IRGC has strategically diversified its operations beyond military and defense industries into critical sectors such as agriculture, construction, telecommunications, and energy. This expansion aligns with Iran's "resistance economy" policy to achieve self-reliance and mitigate the impacts of international sanctions. The IRGC's economic reach extends to major agricultural and infrastructural projects. Through its engineering arm, Khatam al-Anbiya Construction Headquarters (GHORB), the IRGC has become one of the largest contractors in Iran, securing significant government projects, including those related to agriculture and water management. This dominance enables the IRGC to control large segments of Iran's economy, often sidelining private firms through preferential access to state contracts. The IRGC's expansion into food supply and agriculture is part of a broader trend of militarization of Iran's economy. The IRGC uses its influence to manage critical supply chains, including food, which allows it to stabilize and control internal markets, particularly in times of crisis or under sanctions. This move not only supports their logistical needs but also strengthens the IRGC's economic and political leverage within the country.

The IRGC has increasingly involved itself in Iran's agricultural sector to boost domestic production and enhance food security. This involvement is intended to support Iran's resistance economy, a policy emphasizing reduced dependency on imports and bolstering internal production capacities. The IRGC's Chief Commander stated that their forces had entered agriculture to promote self-sufficiency, prioritizing using local technologies and products over foreign alternatives ("Top General Praises Iran's Self Sufficiency - Tehran Times," 2021).

The Iranian Islamic Revolutionary Guard Corps (IRGC) has established extensive control over the country's food supply chain as part of its more extensive influence over various economic sectors. This control extends to formal and informal operations, impacting agriculture, food production, and distribution networks.

The IRGC's economic influence includes dominance over agricultural development and food production projects. Through its construction and engineering arm, Khatam al-Anbiya, the IRGC manages and develops large-scale agricultural and irrigation projects, giving it control over crucial aspects of food production. This involvement ensures that the IRGC can monopolize critical segments of the food industry, from farm outputs to food processing facilities. Such monopolistic control limits competition and centralizes the supply chain under its influence. The IRGC uses its dominant position in Iran's food industry as both an economic and political tool. The organization benefits from favorable government contracts and subsidies, further entrenching its presence. By controlling the distribution of essential commodities like wheat, livestock, and other food products, the IRGC gains leverage over the population and local markets. This allows it to suppress dissent and maintain loyalty by manipulating access to essential resources. The IRGC's practices contribute to the informal economy, where food and agricultural products are smuggled or withheld to manipulate prices. For example, the IRGC's involvement in border controls and critical transportation hubs, such as airports, allows it to bypass customs regulations, importing goods illicitly to maintain its economic advantage. This behavior often destabilizes local markets and contributes to food insecurity, as the organization's financial interests may not align with public needs.

These activities highlight the IRGC's transition from a military and security body to a comprehensive socio-economic entity within Iran, wielding significant power over critical resources, including the food supply chain.

== The IRGC and the Crypto market ==
=== The Role of the IRGC in Iran's Cryptocurrency Market ===
The Islamic Revolutionary Guard Corps (IRGC), a prominent military and political force in Iran, has leveraged the cryptocurrency market as a tool for evading international sanctions, generating funds, and conducting covert financial operations. Given its substantial control over Iran's economic sectors, the IRGC's involvement in cryptocurrency has raised concerns about the intersection of state-controlled entities and digital finance.

=== IRGC's Use of Cryptocurrency for Sanction Evasion ===
International sanctions, especially from the United States, have significantly limited Iran's access to global financial markets, pushing state-linked entities such as the IRGC to explore alternative channels for transactions. Cryptocurrencies, particularly Bitcoin, have provided the IRGC with an effective way to bypass traditional banking restrictions and move money across borders.

The decentralized nature of cryptocurrencies makes them difficult to trace, allowing the IRGC and affiliated groups to use them for sanction evasion and illicit activities. In 2022, the U.S. Treasury's Office of Foreign Assets Control (OFAC) sanctioned two Iranian individuals, Amir Hossein Nikaeen Ravari and Ahmad Khatibi Aghada, both linked to the IRGC. These individuals were involved in cyber-related activities and used cryptocurrency to funnel funds into Iran through local exchanges.

Furthermore, cryptocurrency is increasingly used to fund IRGC-affiliated operations, including cyberattacks and arms smuggling. Digital assets offer a secure and relatively anonymous way to conduct international transactions, which has become crucial for the IRGC under tightening sanctions.

== Links Between IRGC and Domestic Exchanges ==
Certain Iranian cryptocurrency exchanges have been indirectly linked to IRGC operations, raising concerns about their role in sanction evasion. Nobitex, Iran's largest crypto exchange, has facilitated transactions for individuals and entities attempting to bypass international restrictions. Nobitex, along with other platforms, discourages the use of VPNs, but users frequently use such tools to conduct illicit transactions abroad, sometimes with ties to sanctioned organizations like the IRGC.

The IRGC's influence over Iran's economy extends into cryptocurrency mining and trading. While direct evidence linking the IRGC to mining operations is scarce, the organization's control over key industrial and energy sectors makes it a likely beneficiary of the profits generated by mining operations. Iran's energy-intensive mining activities offer high revenue potential, particularly given the country's vast energy resources, making it an attractive target for groups with close ties to the government.

== See also ==
- Pasdar (IRGC)
- Unit 18000
- Unit 340
- Imam Ali Central Security Headquarters
- Unit 700
- Alborz Corps
- Vali-ye Amr special forces unit
