= Fater =

Fater may refer to:

- Károly Fatér (1940 – 2020), Hungarian footballer
- Fater Engineering Institute, subsidiary of Khatam al-Anbia in Iran

== See also ==
- Father (disambiguation)
