= Islamic Revolutionary Guards Corps Research and Self-Sufficiency Jihad Organization =

Iranian research and development unit

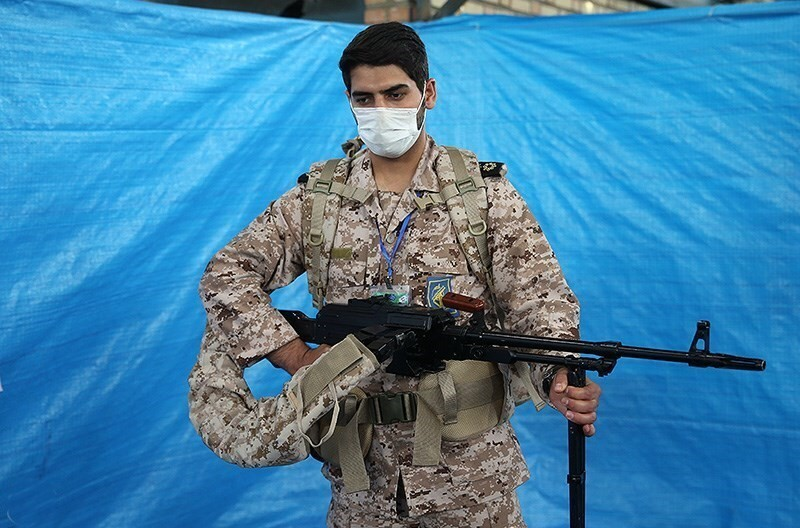

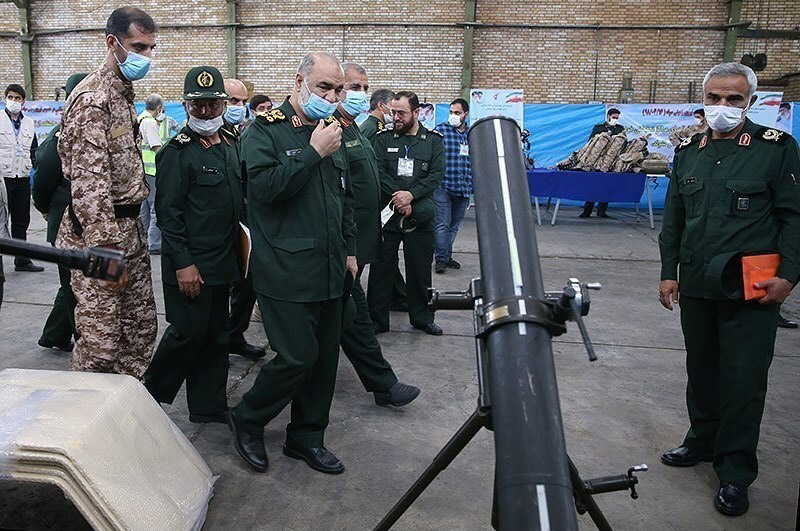

The Research and Self-Sufficiency Jihad Organization (Persian: سازمان تحقیقات و جهادخودکفایی سپاه پاسداران) is an Iranian R&D unit institution of the Islamic Revolutionary Guard Corps established in 1993. According to IRGC, it was attacked in 2021. It has buildings based in Isfahan and Tehran.

It has been sanctioned by US Treasury since July 2017 through Executive Order 13224.

== Products ==
It develops and manufactures ground penetrating radar, communications system, weaponry, combat vehicles, electronic cyber warfare equipment.

Its main contractors include Ministry of Defence and Armed Forces Logistics Iran, Imam Hossein University, Hezbollah IT & Cyber Security Wing, Hamas Communication Brigade.

== See also ==
- Pasdar (IRGC)
- Unit 18000
- Unit 340
- Imam Ali Central Security Headquarters
- Unit 700
- Alborz Corps
- Vali-ye Amr special forces unit
