= Oriental Oil Kish =

Oriental Oil Kish is operated by Khatam al-Anbiya Construction Headquarters in Iran and partially owned by former Iranian President Hashemi Rafsanjani. In 2005, together with Halliburton, it shared a $310 million contract to develop sectors 9 and 10 of the South Pars oil and gas field. It is blacklisted by the United States Department of the Treasury, the United Nations, and the European Union.
