= Gholamreza Mehrabi =

Iranian military officer (d. 2025)

Sardar Gholamreza Mehrabi
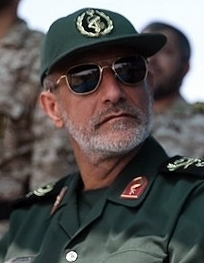
- Born: 11 June 1961; Haftkel, Iran
- Died: 13 June 2025 (aged 64); Tehran, Iran
- Cause of death: Assassination by airstrike
- Military career
- Allegiance: Iran
- Branch: Islamic Revolutionary Guard Corps
- Rank: Brigadier general (Pasdar)
- Unit: Intelligence of the General Staff
- Conflicts: Iran–Iraq War (WIA); Twelve-Day War X

Gholamreza Mehrabi (Persian: غلامرضا محرابی) (11 June 1961 – 13 June 2025) was an Iranian brigadier general in the Iranian Islamic Revolutionary Guard Corps (IRGC). He served as the Deputy Head for Intelligence of the General Staff of the Islamic Republic of Iran Armed Forces from 2016 until his death in 2025 during the Twelve-Day War.

== Career ==
He served as a military commander during the eight years of Iran-Iraq war.

On 16 February 2013, in response to calls from some Iranian officials to engage in nuclear negotiations with the United States, Mehrabi stated: "If we back down they will advance further, therefore we resist. Iran is a great country with abundant holdings; it has a powerful military, intelligent people, decisive leadership, many natural resources and energy. Therefore, if we are present and aware nothing will happen." He also rejected the notion that negotiations would lead to the lifting of sanctions, calling it "a lie". According to Mehrabi, "The goal of sanctions is to pit the people against the authorities, but one must accept that we have managed powerfully and moved past these problems."

He was appointed Deputy Head for Intelligence of the General Staff of the Islamic Republic of Iran Armed Forces in 2016, a position which placed him at the center of Iran's military intelligence operations.

== Death ==
Mehrabi was killed on 13 June 2025 during the June 2025 Israeli strikes on Iran. The strikes, which targeted military and intelligence infrastructure in and around Tehran as well as other locations, resulted in the deaths of several high-ranking Iranian officials, including Mehrabi and Brigadier General Mehdi Rabbani, who was the Deputy Chief of Operations. Iranian state media and official statements described Mehrabi and Rabbani as "martyrs," emphasizing their service during the Iran-Iraq war and their seniority within the armed forces. His funeral, held on 28 June, was set to take place along with those of all the top commanders killed during the Twelve-Day War.

== See also ==
- Assassination of Iranian nuclear scientists
- Targeted killings by Israel
