= Imensazan Consultant Engineers Institute =

Organization based in Iran

The Imensazan Consultant Engineers Institute (ICEI; Persian: مؤسسه مهندسین مشاور ایمن‌سازان) is a subsidiary of Khatam al-Anbiya Construction Headquarters in Iran. It is blacklisted by the United States Department of the Treasury.
