= Sacred Defence Week =

Annual Iranian observance of the Iran–Iraq War

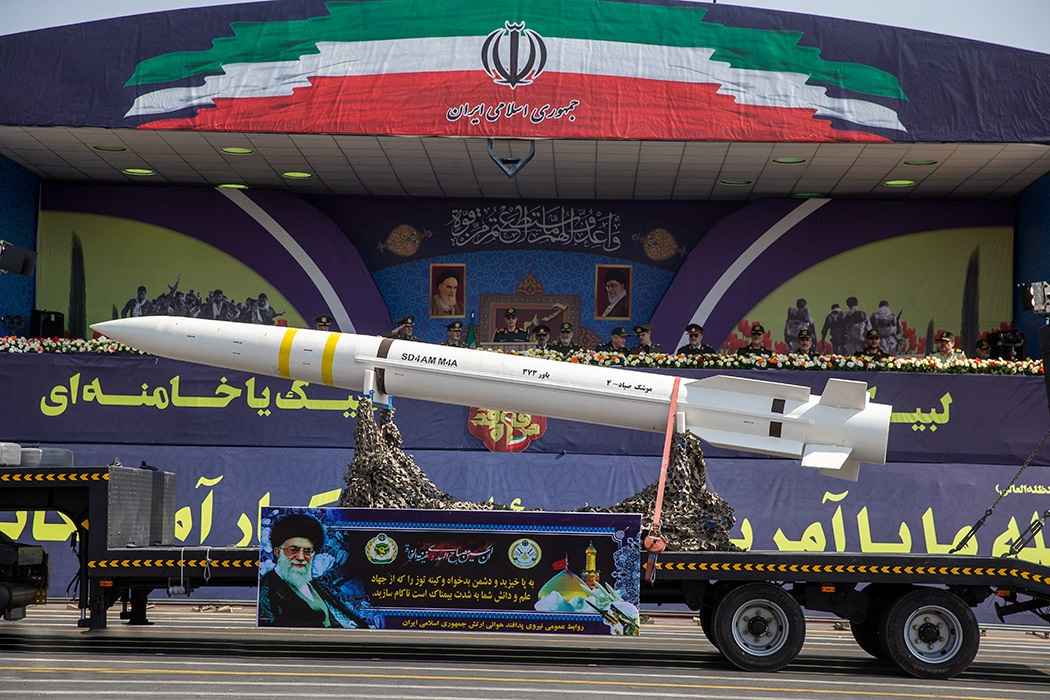
Parade during Sacred Defence Week (2019)

The Sacred Defence Week (Persian: هفته دفاع مقدس Hafte Defâ Moqaddas, also translated Holy Defence Week) is an Iranian annual commemoration of the 1980–1988 Iran–Iraq War (often called "the Sacred Defence" in Iran). It is marked by military parades. It is set by the Iranian calendar and begins on Shahrivar 31.

The Iraqi president, Saddam Hussein at the time, tore up the 1975 Algerian agreement by appearing in front of Iraqi television cameras, announcing the start of the Ba'athist regime's invasion of the Islamic Republic of Iran.

During the Iran-Iraq war, Ruhollah Khomeini, the leader and commander-in-chief of the Islamic Republic of Iran Armed Forces, was responsible for the mass mobilization and organization of the Iranian people and the armed forces, the development of military organization, coordination and cohesion between the armed forces, and the encouragement of war.

This week was known as War Week or Imposed War Week and was later renamed Holy Defense Week.
