= Khatam al-Anbiya Construction Headquarters =

Iranian engineering firm

- Trade name: Khatam Ghorb
- Native name: قرارگاه سازندگی خاتم‌الانبیا
- Type: Public company
- Industry: Engineering
- Founded: 11 February 1979; 47 years ago
- Key people: Abdolreza Abed (Managing Director)
- Number of employees: 40,000 (estimate)
- Parent: Iranian Revolutionary Guard Corps
- Website: khatam.com

Khatam al-Anbiya Construction Headquarters (Persian: قرارگاه سازندگی خاتم‌الانبیا, romanized: Qârargâh-he Sazandegi-ye Xatam alânbia, lit. 'Seal of the Prophet Construction Headquarters') is an Iranian engineering firm controlled by the Islamic Revolutionary Guard Corps (IRGC). The firm, also known as GHORB, is the IRGC's major engineering arm and one of Iran's largest contractors in industrial and development projects. Khatam al-Anbiya was created during the 1980–1988 Iran–Iraq War to help rebuild the country, and has diversified over the years into companies dealing with mechanical engineering, energy, mining and defense.

The company and some of its subsidiaries are affected by UN sanctions.

== Foundation ==
After the Iran–Iraq War (1980–88), the Iranian government encouraged the IRGC to bolster its budget through economic activities. To do so, the IRGC established a headquarters of self-sufficiency and a headquarters of reconstruction. In 1990, the headquarters of reconstruction became gharargah-he sazandegi-ye khatam alanbia, abbreviated Ghorb. In time, the firm became "one of Iran’s largest contractors in industrial and development projects, and today is considered the IRGC's major engineering arm."

== Business activities ==
Khatam al-Anbia is a giant holding firm with control of more than 812 registered companies inside or outside Iran, and (as at 2012) the recipient of 1,700 government contracts. It is said to have a workforce of 25,000 engineers and staff. Ten per cent of the employees are IRGC members while the rest are contractors. According to the firm's website, the company has been awarded contracts in various construction fields "including dams; water diversion systems; highways; tunnels; buildings; heavy-duty structures; three-dimensional trusses; offshore construction; water supply systems; and water, gas, and oil main pipelines."

Two of the most prominent Khatam subsidiaries are Sepasad and Hara; the former is currently constructing Line Seven of the Tehran Metro, while the latter directs tunnel construction and excavation operations throughout the country.

On 25 April 2009, a consortium controlled by Khatam purchased a 51.18% controlling stake in Iran's naval-industrial giant SADRA.

=== South Pars ===
As part of the IRGC, Khatam al-Anbiya is intimately connected to Iran's oil and gas industry. The company has been awarded several phases of the South Pars gas field. In May 2010, the Iranian government awarded Khatam the rights to develop phases 13, 14, 22, 23 and 24 of South Pars. On 30 April 2011, Iran's Oil Ministry awarded two no-tender contracts to Khatam to develop the Halgan and Sefid Baghoon gas fields in South Pars.

=== Activities abroad ===
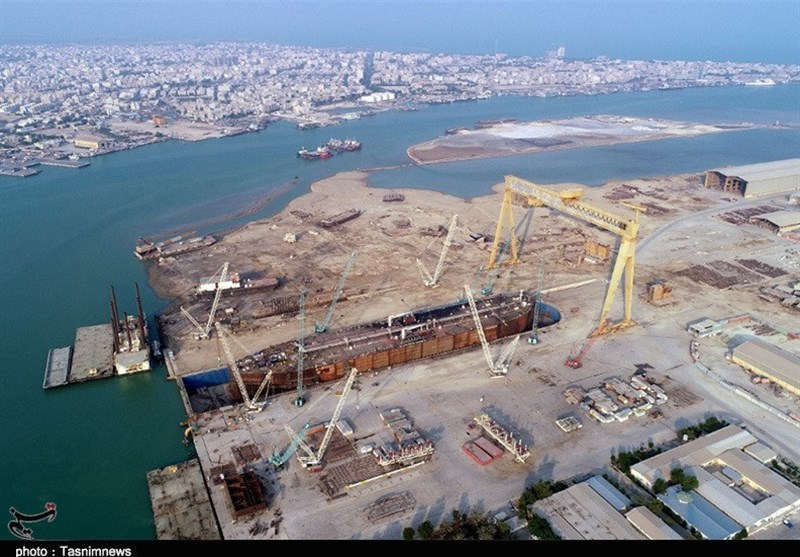
Khatam base shipyard Bushehr

In May 2011, the German newspaper Die Welt reported that Iran is building intermediate-range missile launch pads for its Venezuelan allies on the Paraguaná Peninsula of Venezuela. Khatam al-Anbia is reported to be actively assisting on the project. SADRA also made a contract to build a 120 ton tanker for Venezuela.

=== Project highlights by province ===
- 610-kilometer railroad project of Sistan and Baluchestan Province with a government budget of €300 million with partner Esfahan Steel Company
- Ahvaz drainage (€100 million 2020 National Development Fund of Iran)
- Bonab steel complex €610 million (2020)

== Sanctions ==
=== European Union ===
On 24 June 2008, the European Union listed Khatam as an entity linked to Iran's proliferation-sensitive nuclear activities or Iran's development of nuclear weapon delivery systems. With a few exceptions, EU member states are required to freeze all funds and economic resources owned, held or controlled by the Khatam, and must ensure that no funds or economic resources are made available to or for the listed company.

=== United Nations ===
United Nations Security Council Resolution 1929, adopted on 9 June 2010, targets Khatam as an entity "controlled, or acting on behalf of the Islamic Revolutionary Guard Corps."

=== United States ===
On 25 October 2007, the U.S. Department of Treasury's Office of Foreign Assets Control (OFAC) added Khatam to the Specially Designated National (SDN) list. Pursuant to Executive Order 13382, which targets proliferators of weapons of mass destruction and their delivery systems, this action freezes the company's assets under U.S. jurisdiction and prohibits transactions with U.S. parties.

== See also ==
- Imensazen Consultant Engineers Institute (subsidiary of Khatam al-Anbiya)
- Fater Engineering Institute (subsidiary of Khatam al-Anbiya)
- Makin Institute (subsidiary of Khatam al-Anbiya)
- Construction in Iran
- Economy of Iran
- Energy in Iran
- Industry of Iran
- Military of Iran
- Rahab Institute
