= Pasdar (IRGC) =

Title in the Islamic Revolutionary Guard Corps of Iran

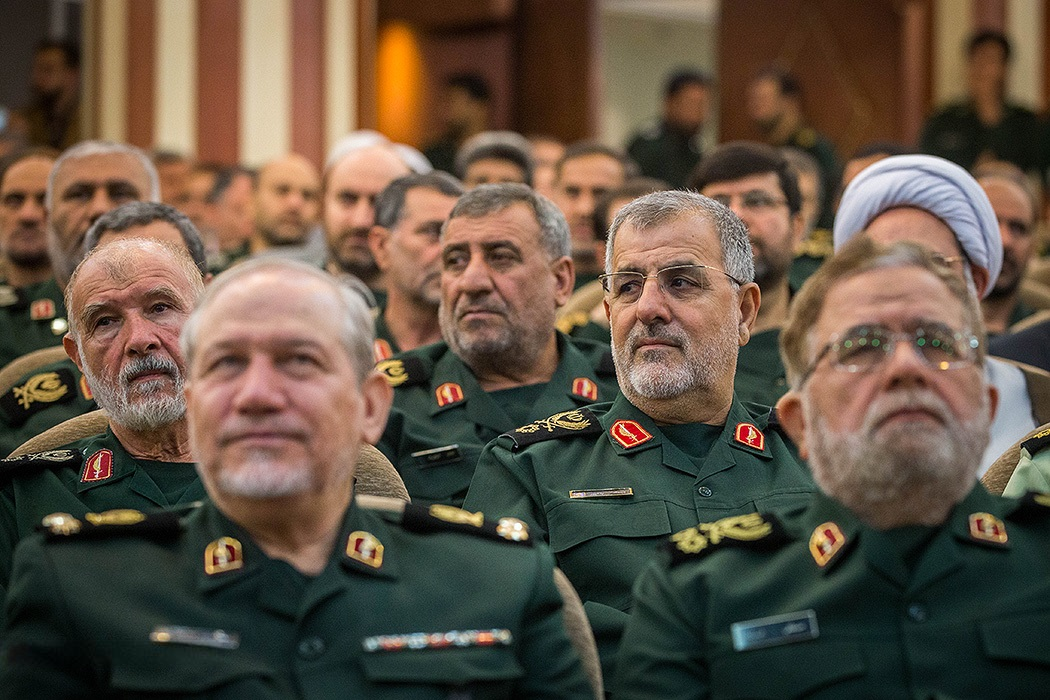
- Pasdars: Induction and valedictory ceremony of Islamic Revolutionary Guard Corps (IRGC) Chief Commander, May 2019.
- Origin: Persian
- Original form: «پاسدار»
- Context: After the 1979 Iranian revolution and when forming the Islamic Revolutionary Guard Corps.
- Coined by: Ruhollah Khomeini
- Meaning: Guardian, watchful

Pasdar (Persian: «پاسدار») is a Persian word meaning "Guardian" which referred to an official member of the Islamic Revolutionary Guard Corps of Iran (IRGC). Pasdar is called to a person who guards the Islamic Iranian Revolution to its completion and upholds its ideology. The foundational ideology of the Iranian Revolution was established and articulated by Ruhollah Khomeini.

With the victory of the Iranian Islamic Revolution in 1979, young and revolutionary forces paved the way for the establishment of the Islamic Revolutionary Guard Corps (IRGC) to preserve and advance the movement and its achievements. Islamic Revolutionary Guard Corps (IRGC) members are individuals recruited to fight in the cause of God and to defend the Islamic Revolution of Iran and its accomplishments with arms.

== Introduction ==
Pasdar means guardian and watchman. In contemporary terminology, it refers to an individual recruited by the Islamic Revolutionary Guard Corps to engage in challenges in the cause of God, as well as the armed defense of the Islamic Revolution of Iran, its achievements, and the system of the Islamic Republic of Iran.

== History ==
With the victory of the Iranian Islamic Revolution in 1979, young and revolutionary forces united to preserve and advance the movement and its achievements. By forming core military and security groups, they paved the way for the establishment of the Islamic Revolutionary Guard Corps (IRGC). The idea to form the Corps was initially proposed by Mohammad Montazeri, who aimed to create a force dedicated to protecting the revolution. He discussed this proposal with Ruhollah Khomeini through Morteza Motahari, who welcomed the idea and issued a decree to establish the Corps. It is reported that the first unit of the Corps which called "Pasa" was also founded by Mohammad Montazeri himself. On April 22, 1979, with the approval of the Council of the Islamic Revolution and the endorsement of Ruhollah Khomeini, the Islamic Revolutionary Guard Corps was officially established by merging several existing groups, becoming an independent force separate from the government and the regular army. After that, anyone recruited by the Islamic Revolutionary Guard Corps (IRGC) was given the title of Pasdar.

The Islamic Revolutionary Guard Corps (IRGC) is recognized as a military, law enforcement, and security force, as defined by Articles 2 to 8 of its statutes. According to Article 150 of the Constitution of the Islamic Republic of Iran and the IRGC's statutes, it has two primary responsibilities:

1. Guarding the Islamic revolution of Iran and its achievements;
2. Engage in challenges in the way of God involves striving for the establishment of God's law and the religion of Islam.

The leader of Iranian revolution, Ruhollah Khomeini, has also emphasized these two duties.

== Views ==
=== Islamic view ===
According to Islamic teachings, Muslims must always be adequately and comprehensively prepared against enemies, and one manifestation of this preparedness is guarding and protecting the Islamic borders. Numerous narrations in Islamic sources emphasize the importance and value of guarding Islamic lands and borders. For example, the Prophet of Islam, Mohammad, stated that one night spent guarding and protecting in the way of God is better than a thousand days of worship and fasting, and the reward of a guard who dies while guarding, equated with die in the way of God. Additionally, among the supplications of Ali al-Sajjad, the great-grandson of the Islamic prophet Muhammad, and the fourth Imam in Shia Islam, there is a complete prayer dedicated to the guardians of the Islamic borders.

=== Ruhollah Khomeini's view ===
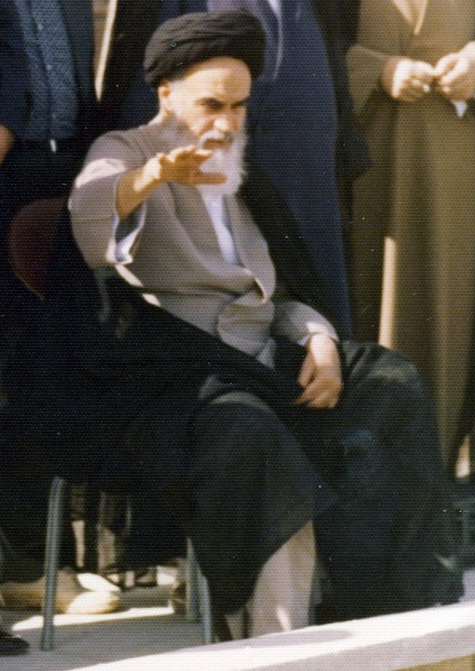
Ruhollah Khomeini: The leader of the Iranian Revolution of 1979 and the founder of Islamic Republic of Iran.

The spiritual leader of Iranian Revolution of 1979, Ruhollah Khomeini, who held a deep interest in the Islamic Revolutionary Guard Corps (IRGC), regarded "Pasdar" as loyal force that emerged from the essence of the revolution and, through their selflessness, brought pride to the Iranian nation. He placed great importance and value on the Islamic Revolutionary Guard Corps (IRGC), viewing their duty not only as protecting the country borders but also as safeguarding Islam and the Quran. From this perspective, he considered jurists and clerics to be the guardians of Islam.

Ruhollah Khomeini, also believed that the value of the IRGC's work in the eyes of God depended on their exemplifying Islamic morality. Ruhollah Khomeini urged the IRGC to fully observe the law and avoid political biases, consistently warning them to repel enemy aggression.

Ruhollah Khomeini regarded the Islamic Revolutionary Guard Corps (IRGC) and the forces of the Islamic Revolutionary Committee as popular, spontaneous, and essential for preserving Islam, maintaining the Islamic system, and governing the country. He viewed them as faithful, religious, and rooted in the principles of the revolution, who, through their selflessness, leadership on the battlefields of truth against falsehood, and dedication to the revolution, Islam, and the nation, brought pride and honor to the country. He held a deep interest in the Pasdars and eagerly sought opportunities to meet with them. He considered encounters with the young, promising, and bright members of the Corps and Basij a source of joy and believed the country and its people depended on them. From the very inception of the Corps, Khomeini held them in high esteem, even expressing, “I wish I were a Pasdar.” He consistently expressed his support and satisfaction with their performance, attributing the country's protection to their efforts. He recognized that weakening the IRGC equated to weakening Islam, viewing it as a conspiracy by opponents of the Islamic Republic. He steadfastly defended the IRGC against negative rumors and counter-revolutionary propaganda. Following Resolution 598, in a message to the commanders and officials of the IRGC, he conveyed his indescribable love and affection for the IRGC, stating that he felt no distance between himself and them and understood their hearts even before they spoke.

Khomeini regarded the Islamic Revolutionary Guard Corps (IRGC) as embodying the characteristic of faith and urged its members to strive to preserve it. He emphasized the importance of realizing this quality within the IRGC and reminded the Pasdars to pay greater attention to Islamic ethics in order to become a complete embodiment of the soldier of Islam. Since Khomeini considered the protection of the self to be a priority over the protection of the country and the revolution, he called on the Pasdars to improve themselves and cultivate moral virtues, so that they would serve as role models and exemplars of Islamic ethics and attract others to Islam through their conduct. He believed that only in this way would the Pasdars’ sacred service be valuable to God.

Khomeini, who recognized the Pasdars’ profound passion for martyrdom and regarded their joyful, radiant faces and tears of happiness, as well as their hearts directed toward God, as a source of his own regret, praised the steadfastness and unparalleled courage of the Islamic soldiers, especially the IRGC. He believed that every particle of their being was imbued with courage. In describing potential threats to the IRGC forces, he warned the soldiers against falling into arrogance, which he identified as one of the plagues of victory, and urged them to be vigilant over their souls to avoid committing unseemly acts influenced by the evil traits hidden within human nature. In this context, he cautioned against the misuse of military power and might.

==== Warnings and recommendations ====
While expressing satisfaction with the performance of the IRGC, Khomeini warned them and reminded them of their duty as defenders of the Iranian revolution. He regarded the IRGC as a significant responsibility and a service to Islam, urging its members to maintain their privileged status and social prestige. He advised them to always be mindful of their behavior and conduct. He encouraged all IRGC members to recognize their true role and responsibilities, emphasizing that, from his perspective, the IRGC embodies the soldier of Islam, and any mistake they make reflects upon Islam itself. He considered the IRGC part of the army of Islam and, while recommending adherence to Islamic standards and principles and the maintenance of military morale, he also called on them to be guardians of the spirit of jihad, martyrdom, resistance, and sacrifice throughout all branches of the country. He urged all armed forces, including the IRGC, to uphold unity and brotherhood, stressing that the IRGC must prevent enemy influence and avoid creating divisions among themselves by maintaining solidarity, as division leads to failure.

On the other hand, Khomeini regarded the preservation of Islam and its transmission to future generations as the duty of the IRGC. He urged them to take an active role in advancing the revolution, promoting accurate Islamic propaganda, and spreading religious and divine values. While the IRGC's primary responsibility is to establish security and defend the Islamic Revolution and the country of Iran, fulfilling this mission requires the IRGC to be equipped not only with military knowledge and awareness but also with spiritual strength. Accordingly, he emphasized enhancing the IRGC's defense readiness, military training, and education, consistently warning them to repel enemy aggression. He viewed maintaining order and discipline as both an organizational and religious obligation of the armed forces, including the IRGC, and was highly sensitive to disorder and indiscipline, considering them causes of weakening the armed forces.

Ruhollah Khomeini called on the Pasdars to fully observe the law and prohibited them from violating it in any way. At the beginning of the revolution, when some chaos prevailed and the country lacked the desired order and discipline, a few individuals acted out of ignorance, outside the framework of their duties and regulations. Sometimes, some Guards, under the pretense of compassion and goodwill for the revolution, interfered in matters that Imam Khomeini explicitly warned them against. He emphasized that they should not engage in any actions contrary to the Guards' policies.

==== Avoiding political and partisan tendencies ====
One of Khomeini's most explicit instructions to the armed forces of Iran, including the Islamic Revolutionary Guard Corps (IRGC), was to avoid factionalism and refrain from membership in or activity within political parties. Khomeini regarded such involvement as a scourge of militarism, believing that the entry of the Revolutionary Guards into political factions—and the resulting support of some Pasdars for one group and others for another—would cause discord within the Pasdars, leading to inefficiency and failure to fulfill their primary duties. In his view, if the military engaged in political games, skilled politicians would undermine the essential unity of the armed forces necessary for serving the country, dragging them toward the East or the West. This would create discord and pessimism among segments of the population, ultimately inflicting harm and exposing the country to foreign domination. Therefore, he strictly prohibited the military, including the Revolutionary Guards, from participating in political affairs, factionalism, and partisanship, and he repeatedly expressed concern about this issue. He also warned about it in his divine political will.[80] While emphasizing that the military must remain aware, vigilant, and possess the necessary political insight rather than act blindly, Khomeini explicitly and emphatically forbade the military and law enforcement forces, including the Revolutionary Guards, from joining political parties or groups. Since Khomeini did not refer to any specific party by the term “party,” the Revolutionary Guards should not be subordinate to any faction or party, nor should their actions suggest such allegiance. Consequently, both overt and covert support or advocacy for any political party, group, or movement is prohibited. For this reason, refraining from membership in or support of political parties, groups, or organizations is among the general conditions for recruiting members of the Revolutionary Guards.

== Tasks and features ==
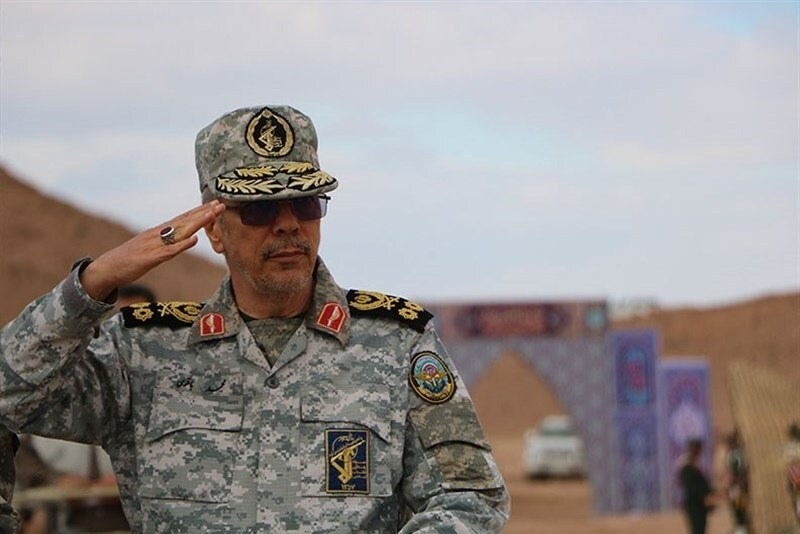
Mohammad Bagheri, a high ranked Pasdar and also the former General staff's commander who was killed during a series of airstrikes launched by Israel against Iran on 13 June 2025.

Practical adherence to Islamic principles and commitment to ethical standards are among the requirements for membership in the Islamic Revolutionary Guard Corps (IRGC). A person who regards all-out challenges in the path of God as a religious duty is considered a Pasdar.

Performing the duty of Pasdar requires having deep religious faith and believing in the correctness and legitimacy of the path of the Islamic Revolution of Iran with certainty and to the point of sacrifice.

Important tasks lie on the shoulders of the Islamic Revolutionary Guard Corps' members (Pasdars). According to the statute of the Islamic Revolutionary Guard Corps (IRGC), the most important duties of the Pasdars are:

1. Protecting one's self and existence;
2. Protecting the pure religion and Islam of Muhammad;
3. Upholding religious, moral, and revolutionary values;
4. Safeguarding the Islamic Revolution, the Islamic Government, and the Islamic Republic of Iran;
5. Safeguarding Islamic beliefs, religious principles, and the essential, life-preserving rulings of Islam;
6. Safeguarding the Quran and the divine laws;
7. Safeguarding the path of the prophets, divine saints, esteemed scholars, and martyrs;
8. Safeguarding the culture of Ashura, as well as the culture of jihad and martyrdom;
9. Safeguarding the absolute authority of the main Islamic jurist and the sanctity of his guardianship.
10. Safeguarding humanity, human life, and the rights of individuals within the Iranian society and all other nations;
11. Safeguarding the security of the Iranian society and the nation;
12. Safeguarding the achievements of the Iranian Islamic Revolution;
13. Safeguarding the line, path, and goals of Ruhollah Khomeini, the founder of Islamic Republic of Iran;
14. Safeguarding the Iranian ideals, as well as the unchangeable foundations and principles, neither Eastern nor Western;
15. Safeguarding political, cultural, economic, military, and social independence of the Islamic Republic of Iran;
16. Protecting human freedom in accordance with Islamic principle;
17. Protecting Islamic justice and social justice in Iran and in the world;
18. Protecting ideological and geographical boundaries of Islamic Republic of Iran;
19. Protecting and enjoining what is right, and forbidding what is wrong, according to humanity;
20. Protecting the identity of Islam and its system in Iran and in the world;
21. Protecting individual rights as well as maintaining social order and discipline;
22. Protecting the religion and devotion of the Iranian peoples, as well as ensuring a good life;
23. Protecting the unity of Islamic societies and the resistance front in the world;
24. Protecting the development of a new Islamic civilization and fostering a unified nation for the world;
25. Protecting the Islamic way of life in both religious and secular societies.

=== Perpetuation of the Iranian Revolution ===
The role of the Pasdars has been very important and vital in the continuation of the Islamic Revolution of Iran. According to the founder of Islamic Republic of Iran, Ruhollah Khomeini, since the Islamic Republic is a trust placed in the hands of the Islamic Revolutionary Guard Corps (IRGC), and defending the Islamic Revolution as well as confronting the conspiracies of Islam's enemies are their duties, the IRGC is a source of honor for Muslims and a shield against the country's threats. Therefore, he consistently praised the IRGC's constructive role and courageous support for the system and the revolution.

Fighting against subversive and counter-revolutionary elements and movements is another important duty of the IRGC,[49] which Khomeini believed they performed well during the early years of the Islamic Revolution. As he acknowledged, when the country was in dire need of security and lacked an intelligence and security organization, the IRGC made significant efforts to discover and dismantle the headquarters of hypocrites and hostile groups.

We must thank the Revolutionary Guards (Pasdars) — these prosperous and hardworking young people who were once among the deprived. These individuals served the country, rose up, and it was through their efforts that this movement reached its current stage.
Ruhollah Khomeini, Sahifeh Imam, Volume 7, Page 475.

Following the victory of the Iranian Revolution of 1979, certain groups and organizations exploited ethnic tensions to foment rebellion and conflict in various regions of Iran. However, the Revolutionary Guards, at the cost of many martyrs, successfully cleared these areas of counter-revolutionaries and restored security. This earned the Revolutionary Guards greater approval from Ruhollah Khomeini. Among other atrocities, counter-revolutionary elements beheaded several IRGC members during the month of Ramadan. In recognition of these martyrs, Khomeini declared that military and law enforcement forces, including the IRGC, were unafraid of martyrdom, and that the IRGC members who were beheaded in Paveh and other locations would be granted eternal life. The era of the Iran–Iraq War was marked by numerous acts of sacrifice, martyrdom, and bravery by IRGC members, which Khomeini also praised. In the final days of Khomeini's life, he expressed gratitude to the IRGC members for their efforts and sacrifices throughout the eight years of the Iran–Iraq War (called "Sacred Defense" among Iranians).

== The Pasdar day ==
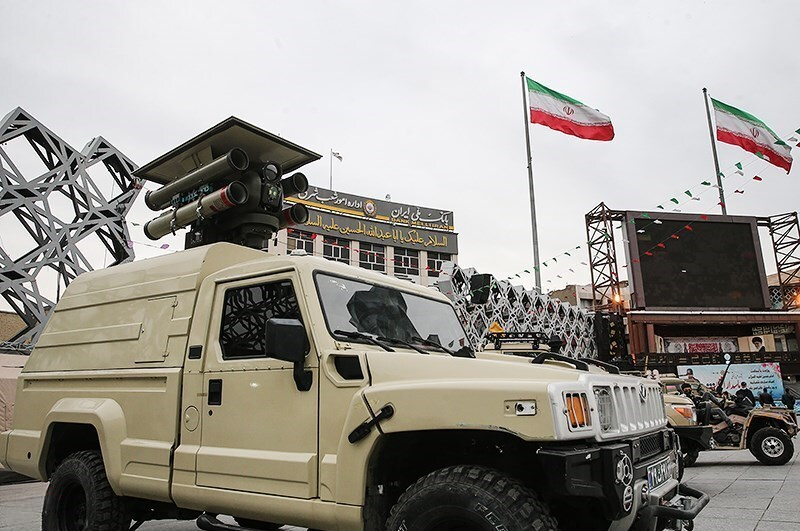
The Pasdar day's exhibition: Emam Hossein Square, Tehran, 2022.

On June 27, 1979, on the occasion of the anniversary of the birth of the third Imam of Shia, Husayn ibn Ali, Khomeini named the day as the Day of the Pasdars, and considered Husayn ibn Ali to be the great guardian of the Quran and Islam, and called on the Pasdars to follow his example. He considered the choice of this day as the Day of the Pasdars to reflect the great mission of the Pasdars, and believed that just as Husayn ibn Ali protected the divine revolution of the Prophet of Islam, Muhammad and saved Islam, the Pasdars would also protect and support the Iranian Islamic Revolution, and they should strive to protect Islam and the rule of truth and justice, which in turn requires the Pasdars to be characterized by justice. He considered the protection and preservation of Islam to be in good and brotherly dealings with people and observing balance in behavior.

== Pasdar relevancy ==
There is an important and influential theory known as "Relevance". This theory proposes that all objects in existence are interconnected in some way. Relevance refers to the discovery of the relationship between one thing and another. Therefore, when two things are related, the nature and type of their connection is called relevance. What is the relevance of the Islamic Revolutionary Guard Corps (IRGC), or the Pasdars, to the Iranian revolution? It appears that a connection between the Pasdars and the Iranian revolution can be established in at least three ways:

1. Protection of the Iranian Revolution (Country and System)
2. Protection of Islam (Iranian Religion and Sect)
3. Protection of the People (Iranian Nation)

Although these three aspects are inseparable in reality, they represent the key dimensions of the Islamic Revolutionary Guards' relevance, which have governed their duties and responsibilities since the inception of the Iranian Islamic Revolution of 1979. The forty-five-year experience of the Iranian Islamic Revolution has demonstrated that the Pasdars’ role is meaningless without embodying these three dimensions of relevance. The Pasdars are not involved in every job, nor is every job worthy of intervention of Pasdars. However, all work that requires safeguarding in these three aspects is connected to the Pasdars. Pasdari is not merely a job; it is a voluntary action carried out in an organized manner on behalf of the Iranian nation.

The primary function of the Islamic Revolutionary Guard Corps (IRGC), whose members are known as Pasdaran, is the defense of the Iranian Revolution, Islam, and the Iranian state. Internal IRGC doctrine frames this service as a religious obligation and privileges compliance with its overarching mission above public discourse or dissent. Institutional texts emphasize that effective defense of the revolution relies on commitment to three components: Islam, the political framework of the revolution, and the Iranian populace. According to organizational ideology, the credibility and social standing of the IRGC stem from religious faith, which underpins the group's institutional values and public perception.

== Uniforms ==
A Pasdar has two main types of organizational uniforms:

1. The headquarters organizational uniform
2. The operational organizational uniform

1. The headquarters organizational uniform of IRGC:
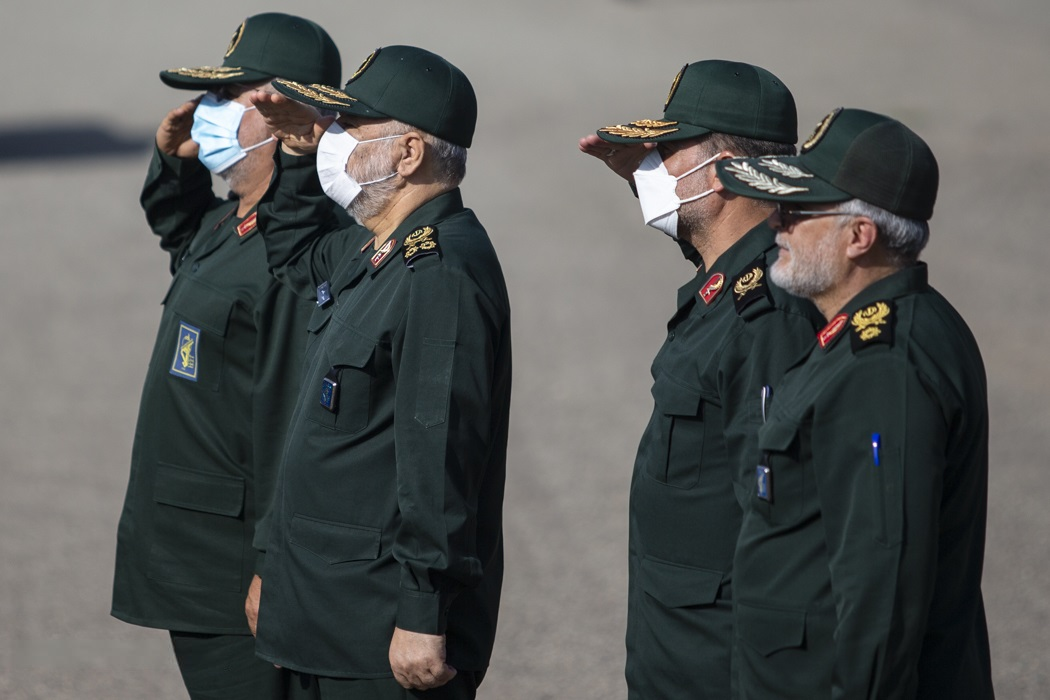

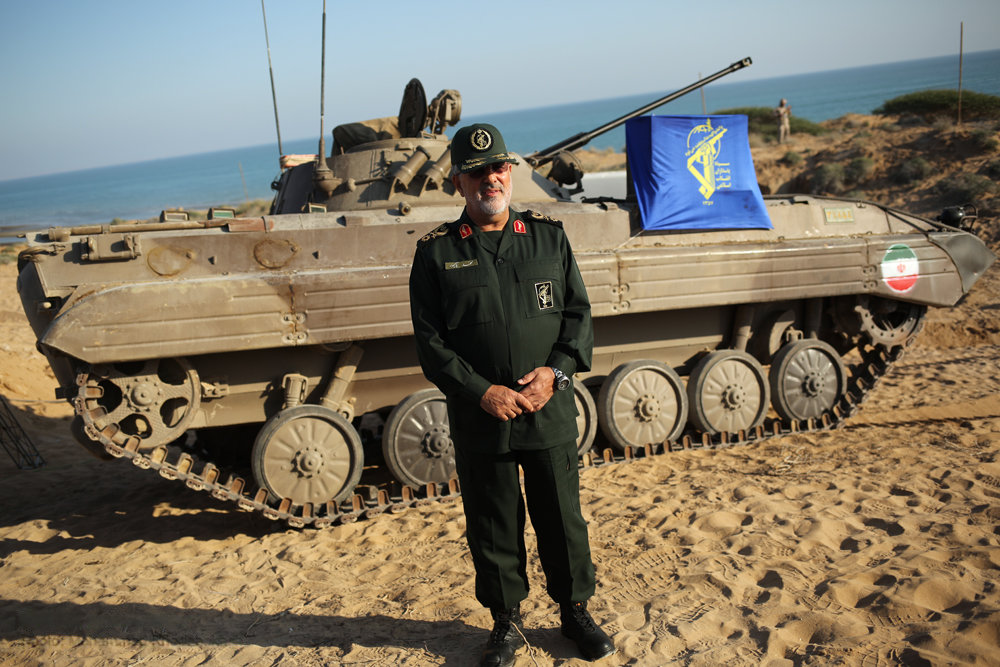

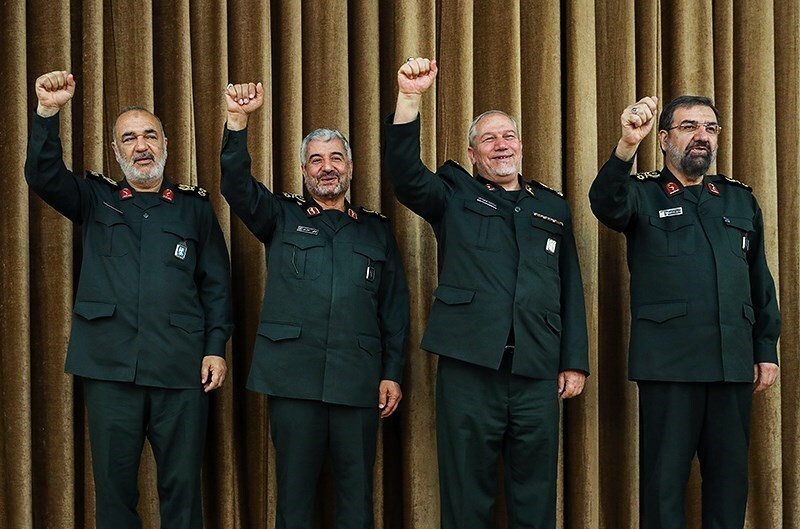
2. The operational organizational uniform of IRGC:
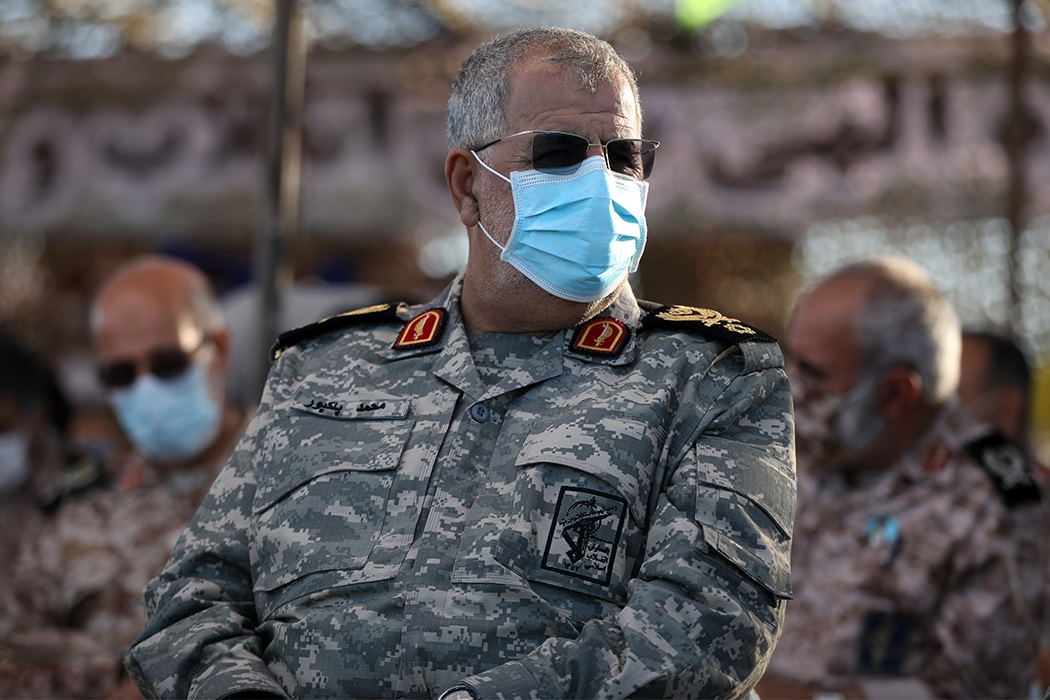

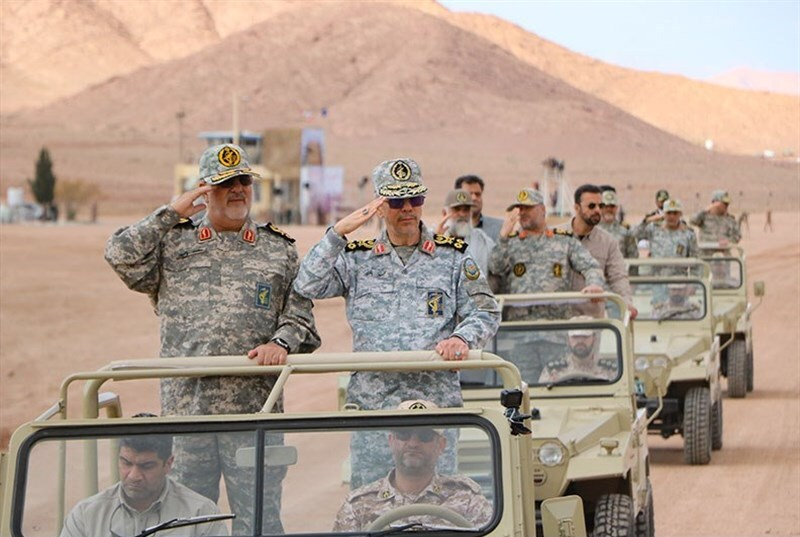

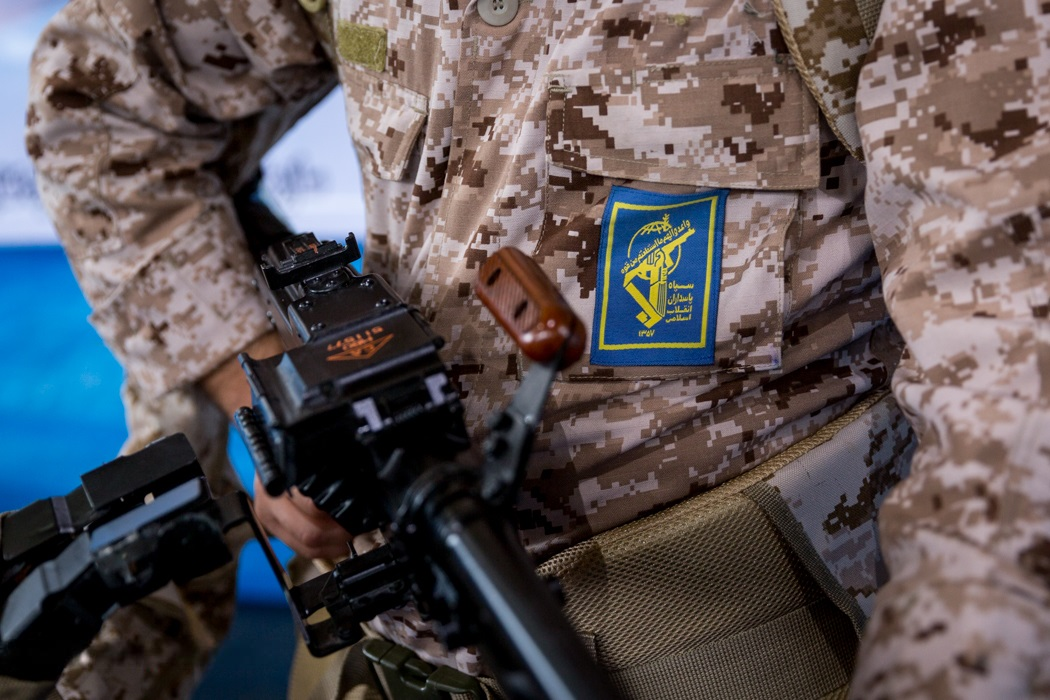

== See also ==
- Arteshtaran-salar
- Baradari (brotherhood)
- Fulad-zereh
- Ganjnameh
- Gharbzadegi
- Javānmardi
- Khawaja
- Marz (country subdivision)
- Morshed (Zurkhaneh)
- Ostandar
- Padishah
- Sardar
- Sarhang (rank)
- Shahbanu
- Iranian military industry
- List of military equipment manufactured in Iran
- List of aircraft of the Iranian Air Force
- List of aircraft of the Aerospace Force of the Islamic Revolutionary Guard Corps
- List of equipment of the Islamic Republic of Iran Air Defense Force
- List of current ships of the Islamic Republic of Iran Navy
- List of equipment of the Navy of the Islamic Revolutionary Guard Corps
- Tanks of Iran
