= Fater Engineering Institute =

Organization in Iran

The Fater Engineering Institute is a subsidiary of Khatam al-Anbiya Construction Headquarters in Iran. It is blacklisted by the United States Department of the Treasury, the United Nations, and the European Union.
