= Israel and the nuclear program of Iran =

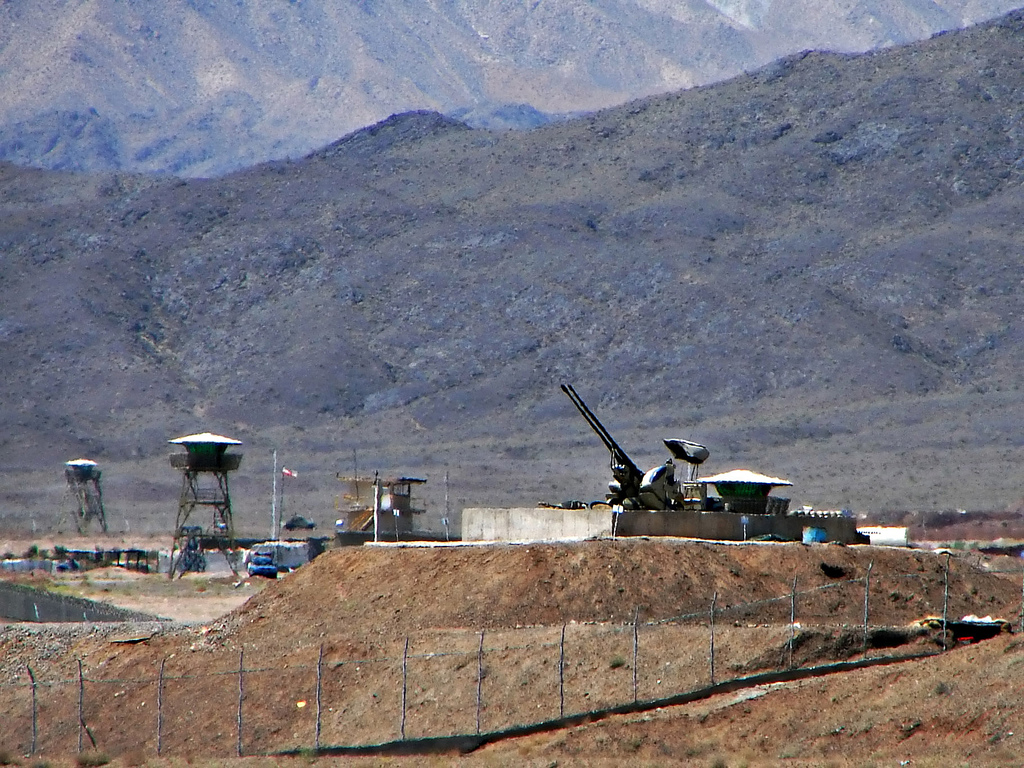
Iran's air defense near Natanz nuclear facilities

The government of Israel believes that if the Islamic Republic of Iran achieves the development of nuclear weapons, the existence of Israel will be in serious danger and this regime will be the first target of a possible nuclear attack by Iran. Benjamin Netanyahu, the prime minister of Israel, who is mentioned as one of the supporters of Israel's "preemptive strike" on Iran's nuclear facilities, has repeatedly emphasized in official speeches that "all the risks are small and insignificant compared to the risk of Iran's nuclearization." The Iranian government has repeatedly emphasized that the country's nuclear program is for peaceful purposes such as energy production and medical issues, and is not seeking to build nuclear weapons. However, since the 1979 Islamic Revolution, the goal of eliminating Israel as a Jewish state has remained a central pillar of Iran's regional policy, and the destruction of Israel is often cited as one of several strategic motives behind Iran's nuclear ambitions.

Also, during the threats of an Israeli attack, the Iranian government emphasizes that it will give a "heavy response" to the "scenario of an Israeli attack" on Iran, and Ali Khamenei, the leader of the Iranian government and commander-in-chief, has also said that "anyone whoever in the thinks of invading the Islamic Republic of Iran, should prepare himself to receive strong slaps and steel fists from the army, IRGC and Basij."

== Support and opposition to preemptive strikes in Israel ==
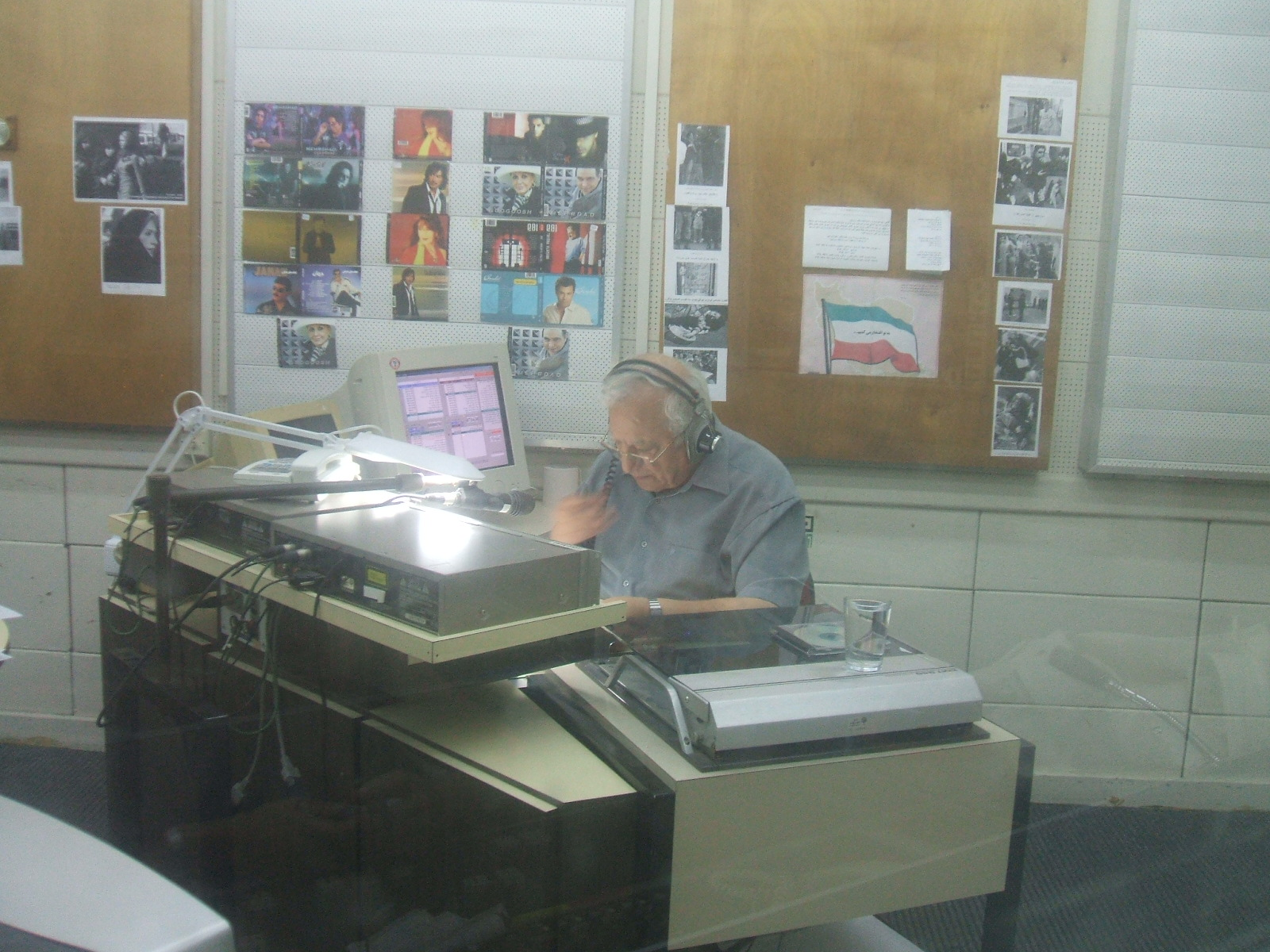
The Voice of Israel, broadcast from Jerusalem to Iran, reflects and broadcasts the Israeli government's political propaganda against "nuclear Iran" in Persian.

Influential and high-ranking people in the Israel Defense Forces and Mossad, Military Intelligence Directorate (AMAN) and Shin Bet (internal security) organizations, as well as among senior politicians and Israeli media, favor or oppose Israel's "pre-emptive attack" on "Iran's nuclear facilities" and each of these two groups have their own arguments and analysis.

Proponents of the "preemptive attack" on Iran's nuclear facilities evaluate the negotiations of the 5+1 group to reach a diplomatic agreement on this country's nuclear program as "failed" and "useless" and as the "waste of time" policy of the Iranian government. This proponents considers the negative impact of Western economic sanctions on Iran's economy insufficient to solve the nuclear crisis and they believes that Iran's nuclear program has progressed significantly during this period. They believe that the Iranian government is reaching an irreversible point in the cycle of uranium enrichment and making ballistic missiles capable of carrying nuclear warheads.

On the other hand, the opponents of the Israeli "preemptive attack" believe that the daily life of the Israeli people will face serious and formidable risks by going to a "risky war".

== Possible attack methods of Israel ==
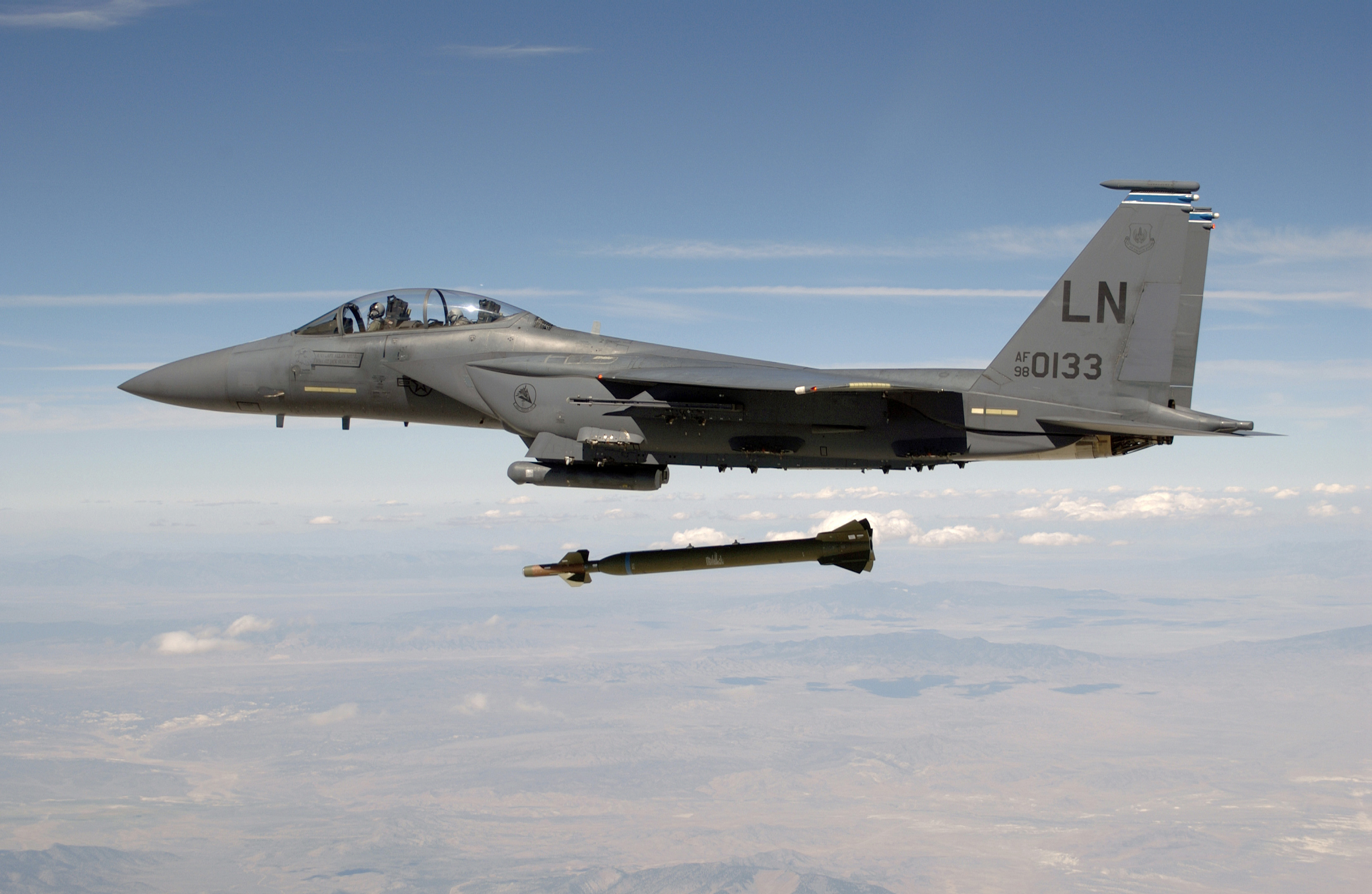
A USAF F-15 Eagle fighter capable of firing a GBU-28 laser-guided missile to destroying underground bunkers.

The Israeli Air Force has purchased from the United States of America various weaponry, including 125 advanced F-15L and F-16L military aircraft, a number of advanced fifth-generation F-35 fighters, and 55 GBU-28 laser-guided missiles. Israeli Air Force fighters are equipped with automatic devices and additional fuel tanks, and are suitable for long-range attacks.

=== Possible routes for Israel's "preemptive strike" ===
According to the analysis of the Israeli newspaper Yedioth Ahronoth, there are four routes for the Israeli Air Force fighters to reach Iran: "The southern route over Saudi Arabia, the northern route over Syria and Turkey, the central route over Jordan and Iraq and a longer route over the Red Sea that does not require entering the airspace of a third country."

=== Alleged plan to attack Iran ===
On August 15, 2012, American journalist Richard Sullivan claimed that he had obtained classified documents through an Israeli politician connected to a high-ranking anti-war officer in the Israeli army. The classified documents was about how Israel attacked Iran. According to this alleged plan, Israel had prepared for a 1-month war. According to Richard Sullivan, military operations would have been "carried out with a series of extensive cyber attacks against Iran's infrastructure. After that, ballistic missiles will be hit Iran's nuclear facilities, command centers and military facilities, research and development centers related to the Atomic Energy Organization and the homes of senior figures related to Iran's nuclear program and missile development. In the final phase, manned fighters will be used to destroy the remaining targets that have not been completely destroyed by ballistic missiles."

=== University of Utah report ===
A study has been conducted at the University of Utah and the Omid Institute about the casualties of a possible Israeli attack on Iran, which says that in the event of an attack on Iran's nuclear centers (in Isfahan, Arak, Natanz and Bushehr), between five thousand to eighty thousand people may be killed. According to the author of this research, Khosrow Semnani, an expert in the industrial management of nuclear waste, the talk of this possible war has always been raised in the political and economic environment, but nothing has been said about the people of Iran who pay the main cost of these events.

According to this report, between 3,000 and 10,000 people will be killed immediately, and in addition, many people will be exposed to nuclear radiation and the death toll will be much higher. This attack may kill or injure between seventy thousand to three hundred thousand peoples only in Isfahan. Also, this research shows that Iran is not ready to help citizens who are exposed to nuclear radiation and "it will be a disaster on the scale of Bhopal and Chernobyl."

== Possible reaction of Iran's air defense ==
Iran has anti-aircraft defense to counter the attacks of hostile fighters, and 29 mobile Tor-M1 and S-300 systems made by Russia. Iran's senior military officials have announced that in case of an attack on Iran, the entire territory of Israel and the military bases of the United States of America in the Middle East region will be targeted by Iranian missiles. Iran has the capabilities to strike Israel with Shahab-3, Sejjil 2, Ghadr-110, Haj Qasem and Khorramshahr ballistic missiles.

According to a report by the London based International Institute for Strategic Studies, Iran's ability to directly counterattack Israel is limited, and according to information obtained from public sources, until 2012, Iran had approximately six Shahab-3 and Ghadr-110 missile launchers.

== Actual attacks against the program ==
=== Assassination of nuclear scientists ===
The Iranian government has accused Israel of assassinating several Iranian nuclear scientists, including Ardeshir Hosseinpour, Massoud Ali-Mohammadi, Majid Shahriari, Fereydoon Abbasi and Mostafa Ahmadi Roshan. Several European sources have also supported this claim.

Following the assassination of Mostafa Ahmadi Roshan, the spokesman of the Israeli army said, "We do not shed tears for this murder." Spiegel magazine, citing an Israeli intelligence official, announced the assassination of Dariush Rezaeinejad as the first serious action of the new head of the Mossad, Tamir Pardo.

Richard Engel published on NBC that "Iranian officials initially accused the Israelis and MEK of being behind the attacks, but they have since added the CIA to the list." In 2012, IRNA reported that the Ministry of Foreign Affairs (Iran) sent a letter to the U.S. saying they had "evidence and reliable information" that the CIA had provided support and guidance to those responsible for the attack. Israel, the MEK, and the U.S. have dismissed these claims as false.

In 2012, the Iranian government accused Majid Jamali Fashi of being "an Israeli agent" involved in the killing of nuclear scientist Masoud Ali-Mohammadi. Fashi, who was 24 years old at the time, was hanged at Evin prison the same year.

Ronen Bergman writes in the book "Rise and Kill First" that after Ariel Sharon appointed Meir Dagan as the head of Mossad, made him responsible for disrupting Iran's nuclear program. Because from the point of view of both of them, Iran's nuclear program was considered a threat against Israel. Dagan used different methods to accomplish this task. According to Dagan, the most difficult and of course the most efficient method was to identify key scientists in Iran's missile and nuclear industry and then kill them. Mossad identified fifteen of these people and eliminated six of them. Most of the elimination operations were carried out in the morning when they were on their way to work by means of quick-explosive bombs that were attached to their cars by a motorcycle rider. These operations and many others initiated by the Mossad and sometimes carried out with the cooperation of the United States were all successful.

Israel has also been accused of assassinating Mohsen Fakhrizadeh. A senior Israeli official, who has been tracking Mohsen Fakhrizadeh for years, announced in an interview with the New York Times a few days after Fakhrizadeh's assassination, says that the world should thank Israel for killing Fakhrizadeh. Israeli Energy Minister Yuval Steinitz announced after the operation that Fakhrizadeh's assassination is positive for the world. Israeli prime minister Netanyahu said in a video message after the assassination of Ministry of Defence and Armed Forces Logistics official Mohsen Fakhrizadeh: "During the last week, I did some things that I don't want to tell you about. This is for you, the citizens of Israel, for our country, this week was an achievement, and there will be more."

=== Iran's reaction ===
The Ministry of Intelligence of the Islamic Republic of Iran has claimed that after the first wave of assassinations of nuclear scientists, the agents of this ministry "monitored the intelligence and operational bases of Israel and identified and arrested some Israeli intelligence officers and mercenary terrorists".

On May 15, 2012, Majid Jamali Fashi, who was tried in the Islamic Revolutionary Court in connection with the assassination of Massoud Ali-Mohammadi and sentenced to execution for the crime of "spying for Mossad and commanding the assassination of Massoud Ali-Mohammadi". Fashi was executed in Evin prison.

=== Television confession of cooperation with Israel ===
In January 2011, Iran's state television aired the television confession of Majid Jamali Fashi, in which he introduced himself as an agent trained by Mossad and accepted responsibility for the assassination of Massoud Ali-Mohammadi.

In August 2012, IRIB TV1, the Islamic Republic of Iran's TV channel 1, aired a special program called "Assassination Club". It televised the forced confessions of some of those accused of involvement in the murder of people related to Iran's nuclear program, and in which Israel was referred to as the "headquarters of the assassination of nuclear scientists."

=== List of those killed ===
- On January 12, 2010, Massoud Ali-Mohammadi, a physics professor at Tehran University, was killed by the explosion of a magnetic bomb.
- On November 29, 2010, Majid Shahriari, professor of physics at Shahid Beheshti University, was the target of an assassination attempt with a magnetic bomb and was killed.
- On November 29, 2010, Fereydoon Abbasi, a professor of physics at Shahid Beheshti University in the Velenjak area of Tehran, was targeted by an assassination attempt with a magnetic bomb, but he survived.
- On January 11, 2012, Mostafa Ahmadi Roshan, the commercial vice president of Natanz Nuclear Facility, was killed by a magnetic bomb explosion in Seyed Khandan area of Tehran.
- On July 23, 2011, Dariush Rezaeinejad, an expert at the Ministry of Defence and Armed Forces Logistics, was shot dead in Tehran.

=== Accusation of attacking Israeli diplomats and citizens ===
In retaliation to the assassination of scientists involved in its nuclear program, the government of Iran is suspected of planning and executing a series of retaliatory attacks on February 13, 2012, in Hindustan, Thailand, and Georgia against Israel's diplomatic affiliates. Iran has also been accused by the Israeli authorities of trying to bomb Israel's interests in Kenya and Cyprus.

Interpol ordered the arrest of several Iranian citizens who were suspected of participating in these retaliatory operations.

On July 18, 2012, a suicide attack on a bus carrying Israeli tourists in eastern Bulgaria resulted in the death of 5 Israeli citizens.

=== Israel's reaction ===
Israeli Prime Minister Benjamin Netanyahu said in response to these attacks: "Iran is the biggest exporter of terrorists in the world and the traces of this country can be seen behind these attacks". The Iranian government has denied these accusations.

=== Malware and computer viruses ===
On January 16, 2011, The New York Times wrote in an investigative article that "Israel first tested the Stuxnet computer worm at the Shimon Peres Negev Nuclear Research Center and on similar centrifuges used in Iran at the Natanz nuclear facility." This is despite the fact that the government of Israel or the United States have never officially confirmed involvement in the spread of the Stuxnet virus.

On June 20, 2012, the Washington Post newspaper wrote in an investigative article that the Flame malware, which had a very complex structure with the purpose of "spying on computer networks and obtaining information necessary to disrupt the progress of Iran's nuclear program" has been produced and used against Iran by the US Central Intelligence Agency, the US National Security Agency and the Israel Defense Forces. Kaspersky Lab has evaluated the date of the beginning of the malware attacks known as "Flame" from August 2010.

=== Explosion at Fordow facility ===
On September 17, 2012, Fereydoon Abbasi, the head of the Atomic Energy Organization of Iran, announced the occurrence of a deliberate explosion in the power lines of the Fordow Uranium Enrichment Plant on August 17, 2012, and added that "power outage is one of the ways to damage centrifuge machines".

On October 30, 2013, Iran's Minister of Intelligence, Mahmoud Alavi, said: "Actually, these people were thieves, not nuclear saboteurs, and they were from the village around the power plant, and they had a history of doing these things."

=== Military strikes (June 2025) ===
At the start of the Twelve-Day War (Operation Rising Lion) on June 13, 2025, Israel launched large-scale attacks against nuclear infrastructure in several areas inside Iran. Explosions were reported at the Natanz Nuclear Facility, in Iran's Isfahan province, where one of the country's most critical nuclear facilities is located. Nuclear sites at Khondab and Khorramabad were also attacked.
