= Iran's disclosure of confidential IAEA documents =

On 31 May 2025, Iran accused the IAEA Director General, Rafael Grossi, of distorting Iran's activities with false and repetitive information. According to a 19-page Iranian analysis dated 3 June, the inspectors used defamatory language and claimed that Iran had seized confidential documents belonging to the agency's inspectors. Iran's active collection and analysis of highly classified Agency documents raises serious concerns about Iran's spirit of cooperation. The agency angered Iran with Grossi's comments in a confidential report obtained by Bloomberg.

The disclosure of these documents follows years of activity by the Iranian Ministry of Intelligence. The International Atomic Energy Agency, by providing them to Israeli officials, led to the assassination of Iranian nuclear scientists, including Ardeshir Hosseinpour, Massoud Ali-Mohammadi, Majid Shahriari, Fereydoon Abbasi, Mostafa Ahmadi Roshan and Mohsen Fakhrizadeh by the Mossad.

== Reactions ==
- Rafael Grossi, Director General of the International Atomic Energy Agency, said in his press conference that according to them, highly confidential agency documents have fallen into the hands of Iran.
- In the absence of progress in the IAEA investigation, European countries have claimed they are ready to refer Iran back to the UN Security Council, where sweeping international sanctions could be reimposed before their October deadline.
- Iran government has warned that it could withdraw from the Nuclear Non-Proliferation Treaty (NPT) if it is referred to the Security Council. Abbas Araghchi, head of Iran's diplomatic service, stressed that the International Atomic Energy Agency's reports should be technical and non-political.
- The International Atomic Energy Agency said that they "appear" to be related to the Soreq Nuclear Research Center.
- Iranian Ministry of Intelligence said Israeli documents reflect lies in international institutions.
- Reuters said A confidential report on this matter was previously made available to 35 members of the Board of Governors.
- Esmaeil Khatib said Iran had transferred thousands of documents from Israel to Iran in a secret operation.
- Iran Foreign Ministry spokesman Esmail Baghaei says that countries that question the "peaceful nature" of Iran's nuclear program and "constantly talk about non-proliferation" are themselves playing a role in equipping Israel's military nuclear program.
- Islamic Republic of Iran Broadcasting (IRIB) announced in a report that the country's intelligence services have removed a large amount of strategic and sensitive information and documents from Israel, including thousands of documents related to nuclear facilities.
- The Times of Israel published a report, citing the names of Roy Mizrahi and Almog Atias, who collected and transmitted this information, and claimed that the two individuals were collecting information in the city of Kfar Ahim, where Israeli Defense Minister Yoav Gallant resides.
- Israel's Channel 12 TV said Iran announced on Saturday that it had succeeded in obtaining an archive of information related to the nuclear project and removing it from Israel.

== See also ==
- Iran and state-sponsored terrorism
- Iran and weapons of mass destruction
- List of Iranian nuclear negotiators
- Timeline of the nuclear program of Iran
- Opposition to military action against Iran
