= Massoud Ali-Mohammadi =

Iranian particle physicist (1959–2010)

- Born: 24 August 1959; Tehran, Iran
- Died: 12 January 2010 (aged 50); Gheytariyeh, Tehran, Iran
- Education: Sharif University of Technology; Shiraz University
- Known for: Quantum field theory; work on Neutrino particle; Modern Quantum Mechanics; being assassinated in relation to Iranian nuclear crisis
- Spouse: Mansoureh Karami
- Scientific career
- Fields: Particle physics
- Workplaces: Tehran University; Sesame Experimental Light-Source

Massoud Ali-Mohammadi (Persian: مسعود علی‌محمدی; 24 August 1959 – 12 January 2010) was an Iranian quantum field theorist and elementary-particle physicist and a distinguished professor of elementary particle physics at the University of Tehran's Department of Physics. Ali-Mohammadi was the first PhD graduate student in physics of the Sharif University of Technology. He published some 53 articles and letters in peer-reviewed academic journals and wrote and translated several physics textbooks, including Modern Quantum Mechanics, revised edition, by J. J. Sakurai, which he translated from English into Persian in collaboration with Hamidreza Moshfegh.

On 12 January 2010, Ali-Mohammadi was assassinated in front of his home in Tehran, while leaving for university. Majid Jamali Fashi was convicted of his killing and executed on 15 May 2012. He stated that he had acted on the instructions of Mossad and had been trained in Tel Aviv.

== Early life and education ==
Ali-Mohammadi was born on 25 August 1959 (although some sources give 23 March 1961). He entered Shiraz University in 1978 where he obtained his BSc in 1985. He subsequently moved to the Sharif University of Technology in Tehran, to study for his MSc in physics. In 1988 he began with his PhD studies at this university as one of its first PhD students in physics. He obtained his PhD there in 1992.

== Research and achievements ==
He was a quantum field theorist with interests in such diverse fields as condensed matter physics (quantum Hall effect in curved geometries), cosmology (modified gravity, dark energy, etc.) and string theory. Quantum field theory is a subject matter quite distinct from nuclear physics, nuclear engineering in general, and nuclear weapons and nuclear power. Iran's Atomic Energy Agency has in an official statement rejected media reports that Ali-Mohammadi was associated with Iran's nuclear program. However, in an interview published in the Christian Science Monitor in July 2014, his widow Mansoureh Karami spoke of his "top secret nuclear work".

Ali-Mohammadi was a Council Member of International Centre for Synchrotron-Light for Experimental Science Applications in the Middle East. He was a professor at Tehran University's Physics faculty. Some sites claimed he was a professor at Imam Hossein University. but Iranian analyst Muhammad Sahimi writes "He was not affiliated with the IRGC-controlled universities, namely Malek-e Ashtar and Emam Hossein universities."

== Political views ==
Ali Moghari, the director of the science department of Tehran University, described Ali-Mohammadi as an "apolitical professor", saying "he was a well-known professor but was not politically active."

Ahmad Shirzad (reformist member of the sixth Iranian Parliament, professor of physics in Isfahan and close friend of Ali-Mohammadi) wrote: "In general his beliefs and actions were close to that of moderate Muslims. ... During the past couple of years he had ideologically become very close to the reformist movement. In the past few elections before the recent presidency election, he had voted for the reformist candidates and had been campaigning for them too." Shirzad adds that Ali-Mohammadi told him how he and his students took part in 2009 Iranian election protests, 16 June.

It was claimed by Tehran University's Basij, or voluntary Islamist student militia, that his name was on a list of sanctioned individuals connected with Iranian nuclear program, but he was not on a compiled list. Ali-Mohammadi was among 240 university professors who signed a letter before the 2009 Presidential Election expressing support for the main opposition candidate, Mir Hossein Moussavi.

On reporting his burial, Al Jazeera reported on his lack of political involvement deepening the confusion over what motivation could have been behind the murder. They reported, "one of Ali Mohammadi's close friends (was quoted) as saying that the professor was never a political activist", and that, "... [Ali-]Mohammadi had very deep reformist tendencies but never mixed it up with his professional character." Ali Moghara, who heads the physics faculty at Tehran University, said Ali-Mohammadi was just a "world famous" physicist who engaged in "no political activity".

== Personal life ==
Ali-Mohammadi was married to Mansoureh Karami (Persian: منصوره كرمی).

== Assassination ==
On 12 January 2010, at 07:58 am, a motorbike rigged with explosives and parked near his car exploded while he was leaving home in Gheytariyeh neighbourhood of northern Tehran, for university. The windows of residences around the scientist's home were shattered by the force of remote controlled explosion, and it was reported that two other people were also injured in the blast.

Iranian state media accused Israel and the US of responsibility, while the US State Department called the allegation "absurd". Ynetnews stated that "there is no known connection between his participation" in the SESAME, an international synchrotron-radiation facility located in Jordan, and the assassination. According to US intelligence sources, Israel is running a secret war against Iran, among techniques used are the killing of important persons in the Iranian atomic energy program.

Another source found the assassination of "a 50-year-old researcher with no prominent political voice, no published work with military relevance and no declared links to Iran's nuclear program", as puzzling, although there were comparisons with the disappearance of Shahram Amiri in 2009 and the death of Ardeshir Hosseinpour in 2007.

=== Funeral ===
On 14 January, Ali-Mohammadi was buried. His burial was arranged at Emamzādeh Ali-Akbar Chizar in Tehran on Thursday 14 January 2010.

Timesonline described it as "Supporters of Iran's regime hijacked the funeral." As his body was carried from his home in northern Tehran hundreds of government loyalists surrounded it and were shown on Iranian state television waving Iranian flags and chanting anti-American and anti-Israeli slogans.

=== State investigation ===
Twenty-four-year-old Majid Jamali Fashi was arrested days after the killing, and in January 2011, Iranian state television aired a confession by Fashi to having killed Ali-Mohammadi on behalf of Mossad. Fashi's arrest may have come as a result of a September 2009 WikiLeaks diplomatic cable from the US Embassy in Baku, Azerbaijan. The cable quoted an Iranian source who was a licensed martial arts coach who was in contact with the Americans. Fashi was reportedly in Baku to participate in an international martial arts competition days before the cable was written. On 28 August 2011, Fashi was convicted and sentenced to death by the Islamic Revolutionary Court. He was hanged on 15 May 2012 at Tehran's Evin Prison.

=== Media speculation ===
The BBC's Tehran correspondent Jon Leyne said "Iranian media were unusually quick off the mark to report the killing, to show television pictures, and to give the sort of details that usually only emerge after hours, days, or weeks in this secretive state". An anonymous former senior official expressed doubt about the official account of Ali-Mohammadi's assassination and expressed concern that the assassination could be used as an excuse for violence against opposition protesters: "This is an old trick. ... They did it themselves but blame it on opposition groups so that they can easily begin issuing death sentences for protesters. I think this means there could be more violence against the opposition."

Opposition groups who monitor Hezbollah, the militant Lebanese movement, in Tehran, claim that a member of Hezbollah, known by his pseudonym "Abu Nasser", was photographed at the scene of the explosion in Tehran's affluent Gheytarih suburb.

According to Iranian-Israeli analyst Meir Javedanfar, It is "possible that [Ali-]Mohammadi was assassinated by a foreign intelligence agency" with the aim of stopping the Iranian nuclear program and also causing embarrassment for the government of Ahmadinejad. Flynt Leverett, director of New America Foundation, said that while it is "highly unlikely that the United States was directly involved" in the assassination, it is "possible that a group or an individual" who received financial support as part of the $400 million US covert activities program initiated under Bush administration against Iran, might have carried out the assassination.

However, Iranian analyst Muhammad Sahimi thinks it unlikely that the murder was directed against Iran's nuclear program as it is engineers, not nuclear physicists, who are "leading" that program, and in any case Ali-Mohammadi's research was in the general area of particle physics, "which is of a fundamental, rather than practical nature". Ali-Mohammadi was also not under contract with Atomic Energy Organization of Iran, according to its spokesman Ali Shirzadian, nor was he affiliated with the universities under the control of the Revolutionary Guard (Malek-Ashtar University of Technology and Imam Hossein University). On the other hand, "a source in Tehran" told Sahimi that Ali-Mohammadi had worked with the Islamic Revolution Guards "on several projects in the past," and this knowledge combined with the Guard's penchant for exacting vengeance against "anyone who deserts them and joins the opposition" adds to "the suspicion that the hardliners may have had something to do with" his murder.

Al Jazeera reported that authorities on condition of anonymity have confirmed his involvement with Iranian nuclear program. The Economist also quoted anonymous Western sources describing him as "one of the most important people involved in the [nuclear] programme". It was also reported that he was a professor at Tehran University's Physics faculty as well as a professor at the IRGC run, Imam Hossein University which houses a physics research center apparently under control of the IRGC. There were also reports of a decapitation program as part of a covert war against Iran, with the aim of assassinating people that are or have been involved with Iranian nuclear program, much like a similar successful program conducted in Iraq, resulting in assassination of hundreds of Iraqi scientists. There were also reports of Israel's involvement in these covert actions, while other reports suggested the creation of a joint assassination team put together by western democracies to neutralize Iranian scientists and engineers.

An article in Time magazine claimed that a Western intelligence source confirmed the truth of the confession made by Majid Jamali Fashid, who said he assassinated Massoud Ali-Mohammadi on behalf of Mossad, Israel. The source confirmed that Iranian intelligence had cracked one cell trained and equipped by Mossad, and blamed a "third country" for exposing the cell.

== See also ==
- Ardeshir Hosseinpour
- Ali-Reza Asgari
- Majid Shahriari
- Fereydoon Abbasi
- Daryoush Rezaei
- Mostafa Ahmadi Roshan
- Mohsen Fakhrizadeh
- Fordow Uranium Enrichment Plant, officially named after him after his assassination
