= Saeed Borji =

Iranian nuclear physicist and nuclear engineer (1958–2025)

- سعید برجی
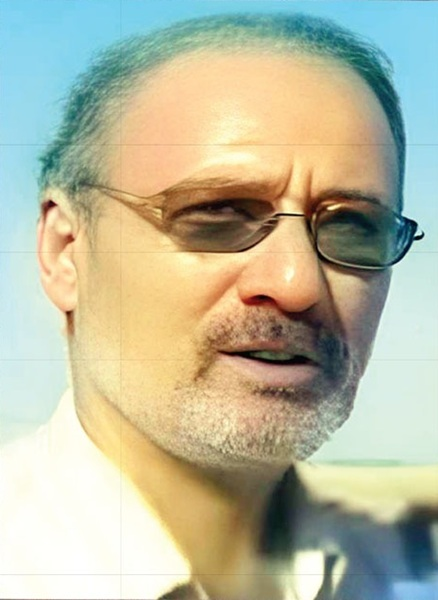
- Born: 1958; Abadan or Kazerun, Iran
- Died: 13 June 2025 (aged 66–67); Tehran, Iran
- Cause of death: Assassination by Israeli airstrike
- Education: Malek-Ashtar University of Technology
- Occupations: Nuclear physicist and nuclear engineer
- Years active: 1980–2025
- Known for: Work on Iran's nuclear programme and defence technologies
- Spouse: Mansoureh Aalikhani

Saeed Borji (Persian: سعید برجی; 1958 – 13 June 2025) was an Iranian nuclear physicist and nuclear engineer who was involved in Iran's nuclear programme. He held a PhD in mechanical engineering from Malek-Ashtar University of Technology. He was killed in Israeli airstrikes on Iran in June 2025.

Borji was sanctioned by the U.S. Department of the Treasury in March 2019 for his alleged role in developing defence equipment for the Islamic Republic of Iran.

== Early life and education ==
Saeed Borji was born in 1958, with sources citing either Kazerun, Fars Province, or Abadan as his birthplace. After completing his secondary education in mathematics and physics, he studied mechanical engineering at university level.

Borji was admitted to the mechanical engineering programme at Malek-Ashtar University of Technology with a scholarship from Iran's Ministry of Defence and Armed Forces Logistics, where he earned his PhD in mechanical engineering. Upon completing his doctorate, he joined the faculty at the same university.

== Career ==
Borji worked as a nuclear physicist and mechanical engineer in Iran, teaching at various universities. According to Iranian media, he was involved in advancing nuclear knowledge and promoting its domestic development.

He reportedly worked with Mohsen Fakhrizadeh, a nuclear physicist and head of the Organization of Defensive Innovation and Research (SPND) within Iran's Ministry of Defense. Borji was allegedly a member of the SPND, which coordinates Iran's defence research programmes.

According to some sources, Borji was considered one of Iran's leading nuclear scientists alongside Fereydoon Abbasi and other prominent figures in the field.

Reports suggest he held expertise in explosive materials and defence technologies, and played a role in the AMAD Project, contributing to strategic technologies and high-energy materials research. He was also involved in academic teaching and knowledge transfer.

Israeli media described him as involved in nuclear weapon detonator design, whilst Iranian sources disputed these characterisations.

Some reports indicated that he established companies in the petrochemical sector, though the U.S. Treasury Department sanctioned him and associated entities in March 2019 for allegedly supporting Iran's defence programmes.

=== Academic work ===
Borji was a faculty member at Malek-Ashtar University of Technology and reportedly authored academic papers in materials science, nanotechnology, and mechanical engineering published in both Persian and English.

== Sanctions ==
In March 2019, Saeed Borji was sanctioned by the U.S. Department of the Treasury for his alleged role in developing explosive materials and technologies for Iran's defence sector, particularly through his reported work with the Organization of Defensive Innovation and Research (SPND).

== Death ==
Borji was killed on 13 June 2025 during Israeli airstrikes on Iran as part of the Twelve-Day War. He was reportedly targeted due to his involvement in Iran's nuclear programme.

According to Iranian sources, his wife Mansoureh Aalikhani, described as a painter, was also killed in the attack. The strike occurred in the early hours of Friday, 13 June 2025, in Tehran.

Iranian media reported that Borji was among several nuclear scientists killed during the same period of airstrikes, though the exact number and identities of others killed varies between sources.

His funeral was held on 28 June 2025, alongside those of other officials killed during the Israeli strikes.

== See also ==
- Nuclear program of Iran
- Assassinations of Iranian nuclear scientists
- Twelve-Day War
- Fereydoon Abbasi
- Mohsen Fakhrizadeh
