= Assassinations of Iranian nuclear scientists =

21st-century assassination campaign

Since 2010, multiple Iranian nuclear scientists have been killed in foreign-linked assassinations. Five were killed from 2010 to 2020 by car bombings or shootings. Fereydoon Abbasi was among the scientists who survived an assassination attempt in 2010, an assassination that killed another nuclear scientist, Majid Shahriari. Abbasi was later killed on 13 June 2025 during Israeli strikes on the Iranian nuclear program.

Other notable scientists killed in the Israeli airstrikes include Mohammad Mehdi Tehranchi, Abdolhamid Minouchehr, Ahmad Reza Zolfaghari, Amir Hassan Fakhahi, Akbar Motallebzadeh, Ali Bahuei Katirimi, Mansour Asgari, Seyyed Amir Hossein Feghhi and Saeed Borji.

The Iranian government accused Israel of complicity in the killings in order to disrupt Iran's nuclear program. In 2011 and 2012, Iranian authorities arrested a number of Iranians alleged to have carried out the assassination campaign on behalf of Mossad. Western intelligence services and U.S. officials reportedly confirmed the Israeli connection. Israel neither confirmed nor denied its role in the assassinations. Israeli defense minister Moshe Ya'alon said: "We will act in any way and are not willing to tolerate a nuclear-armed Iran. We prefer that this be done by means of sanctions, but in the end, Israel should be able to defend itself." The assassination campaign was reportedly terminated in 2013 following diplomatic pressure from the United States, which was attempting to negotiate restrictions on Iran's nuclear activities.

== Incidents ==
Incidents are listed here, including one in which the victim survived, and one where assassination has not been confirmed.

Date	Victim	Expertise	Method and location	Outcome
15 January 2007	Ardeshir Hosseinpour	Professor, authority on electromagnetism	By gas or possibly radiation poisoning, in Shiraz	Died
12 January 2010	Masoud Ali-Mohammadi	Professor, quantum field theorist and elementary particle physicist	By a remote-control bomb attached to a motorcycle, in Tehran	Assassinated
29 November 2010	Majid Shahriari	Nuclear engineer specialized in neutron transport	By a bomb attached to his car from a motorcycle, in Tehran	Assassinated
29 November 2010	Fereydoon Abbasi	Professor, nuclear physicist and administrator	By a bomb attached to his car from a motorcycle, in Tehran	Survived
23 July 2011	Darioush Rezaeinejad	Physicist, expert in neutron transport	Shot by motorcycle gunmen, in Tehran	Assassinated
11 January 2012	Mostafa Ahmadi Roshan	Professor, researching the making of polymeric membranes for gaseous diffusion	By a bomb attached to his car from a motorcycle, in Tehran	Assassinated
27 November 2020	Mohsen Fakhrizadeh	Professor, nuclear physicist and head of Iran's nuclear program	Shot by a remote-control machine gun, in Damavand	Assassinated
13 June 2025	Fereydoon Abbasi	Former head of Atomic Energy Organization of Iran, expert in nuclear engineering	Killed in simultaneous strikes on Tehran	Assassinated
13 June 2025	Seyyed Amir Hossein Feghhi	Full professor at Shahid Beheshti University, deputy of the Atomic Energy Organization of Iran, expert in physics	Killed in simultaneous strikes on Tehran	Assassinated
13 June 2025	Akbar Motalebizadeh	Faculty member at Shahid Beheshti University, nuclear engineer and expert in chemical engineering	Killed in simultaneous strikes on Tehran	Assassinated
13 June 2025	Mohammad Mehdi Tehranchi	President of the Islamic Azad University, expert in physics	Killed in simultaneous strikes on Tehran	Assassinated
13 June 2025	Saeed Borji	Expert in materials engineering	Killed in simultaneous strikes on Tehran	Assassinated
13 June 2025	Mansour Asgari	Expert in physics	Killed in simultaneous strikes on Tehran	Assassinated
13 June 2025	Ahmadreza Zolfaghari Daryani	Distinguished professor of nuclear engineering at Shahid Beheshti University, expert in nuclear engineering and nuclear physics	Killed in simultaneous strikes on Tehran	Assassinated
13 June 2025	Ali Bakhouei Katirimi	Expert in mechanics	Killed in simultaneous strikes on Tehran	Assassinated
13 June 2025	Abdolhamid Minouchehr	Nuclear physicist and nuclear engineer, head Nuclear Engineering at Shahid Beheshti University	Killed in simultaneous strikes on Tehran	Assassinated
20 June 2025	Isar Tabatabai-Qamsheh	Nuclear engineer	Airstrike in Tehran	Assassinated
24 June 2025	Mohammad Reza Sedighi Saber	Nuclear engineer, head of the Organization of Defensive Innovation and Research Shahid Karimi Group.	Airstrike in Tehran	Assassinated
25 March 2026	Hossein Zaki Dizaji	Nuclear engineer, professor at Imam Hossein University.	Airstrike in Tehran	Assassinated

=== Ardeshir Hosseinpour ===
On 15 January 2007, Ardeshir Hosseinpour, a professor at Shiraz University, was initially reported to have died of "suffocated by fumes from a faulty gas fire in sleep". Later reports indicated foul play. American private intelligence company Stratfor released a report on 2 February 2007 in which the claim was made, based on "sources very close to Israeli intelligence," that the victim was "in fact a long-time Mossad target."

In 2014, Ardeshir's sister, Mahboobeh Hosseinpour, interviewed from Turkey in a conversation arranged by "The New Iran" opposition group, claimed that her brother was murdered by Iran's Revolutionary Guards rather than by Israel, for refusing to participate in "Iran's nuclear enrichment program whose use was for atomic [weapons] purposes." According to Stratfor, Hosseinpour died of radiation poisoning.

=== Masoud Ali-Mohammadi ===
On 12 January 2010, Masoud Ali-Mohammadi, a professor of physics at the University of Tehran, was killed by a remote-controlled bomb attached to a motorcycle parked near his car. The bomb exploded on the street outside his home in the Gheytariyeh neighbourhood of northern Tehran as he left for work. Two other people were wounded in the blast, which shattered windows in a nearby four-story building, damaged window frames and blew a garage door out of its frame. The BBC reported that neighbors assumed the jolt was caused by an earthquake. Iran blamed Israel and the U.S. for the attack.

In January 2011, Iran announced that it had arrested 10 Iranian citizens who had worked with Mossad to carry out the assassination. State television broadcast a confession by Majid Jamali Fashi, who said he acted on the instructions of Mossad and had been trained in Tel Aviv: "I woke up at 4 and made a call, the plan had not changed. I parked the motorbike near the tree," Fashi said in his confession. Ali-Mohammadi's wife said, "I heard the explosion just when I closed the door." Later confirmed genuine by Western intelligence officials, Fashi was executed by Iran in May 2012.

According to Iranian media, Maziyar Ebrahimi was an alleged perpetrator code-named Amiryal (Persian: "امیریل") Maziyar Ebrahimi was later exonerated and explained eight years later how he was proved to be innocent in an interview. Ebrahimi told the BBC that Iran had tortured him into confessing he was a spy.

=== Majid Shahriari and Fereydoon Abbasi ===
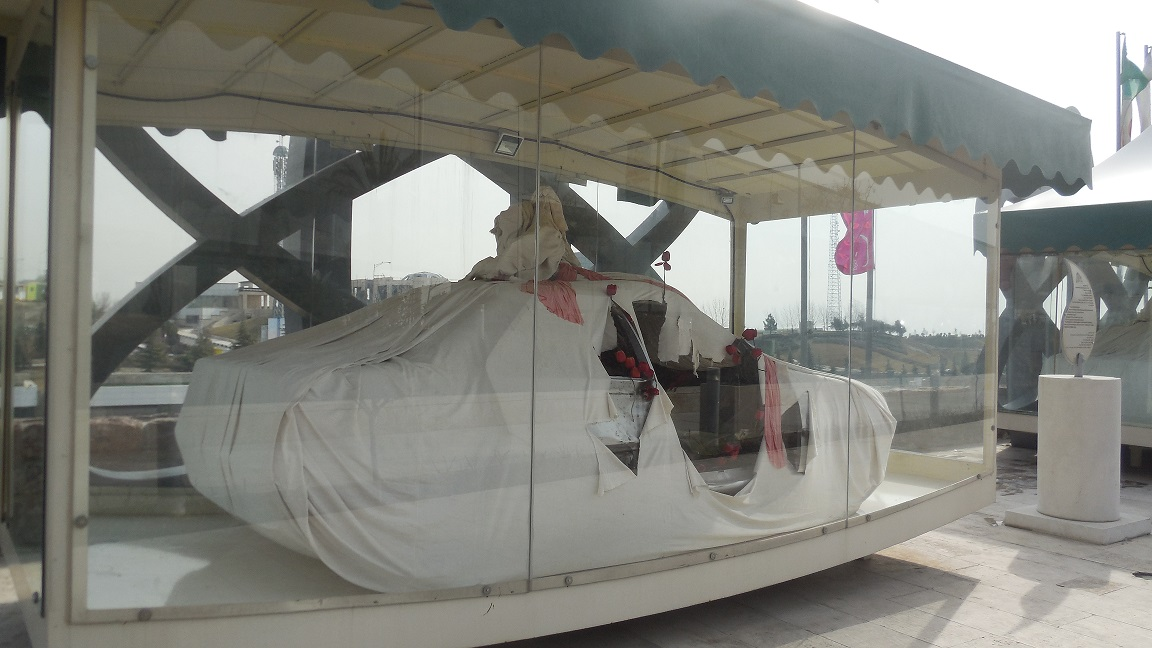
Majid Shahriari's exploded car, National Museum of the Islamic Revolution & Holy Defense, Tehran, Iran.

On 29 November 2010, Majid Shahriari, a professor at Shahid Beheshti University was killed by a bomb launched from a motorbike. The assassins had attached a bomb, detonating it from a distance. Shariari's wife, Ghasemi, was a passenger in the car and was injured in the explosion.

"I attached the bomb to the right front door and moved away quickly," said Arash Kerhadkish, who was convicted of assassinating Shahriari. One member of the assassination team was knocked from his motorcycle by the force of the blast. "The motorcycle fell down and one of the riders was injured. We helped him," said Maryam Izadi, a convicted member of the team, under interrogation.

In an almost simultaneous bomb attack, Fereydoon Abbasi, a professor at Shahid Beheshti University, where Shahriari also taught, and his wife were injured. "I had a meeting with Dr. Shahriari at the early morning. ... The bomb was attached to my car at 7:42. We were around the university square and I heard the sound of something colliding with my car and looked back and saw a motorbike. I concluded that that thing colliding with the car was [a] bomb. I stopped at once and told my wife to get out." According to his wife, Abbasi sustained facial and hand injuries. On 13 June 2025, Abbasi was killed in an airstrike by Israel.

=== Darioush Rezaeinejad ===
On 23 July 2011, Darioush Rezaeinejad was shot five times and killed by motorcycle-riding gunmen in front of his home while he was with his wife after they picked up their daughter from kindergarten. His wife was also wounded in the attack.

The attack was described by an Israeli intelligence interviewed by Der Spiegel as "the first public operation by new Mossad chief Tamir Pardo". Rezaeinejad's wife, Shohreh Pirani, was also wounded in the attack. "I got off quickly and followed the shooter. After running several meters, I realized that they were shooting at me. I fell down and heard the motorcycle go away," she later said.

Initial reports said the gunmen had killed 35-year-old "Darioush Rezaei," a physics professor whose area of expertise was neutron transport, and who was linked to Iran's nuclear program. The victim was subsequently identified as Rezaeinejad, a postgraduate electrical engineering student at Tehran's K. N. Toosi University of Technology, who was expected to defend his thesis and working at a "national security research facility."

After the assassination, the speaker of Iran's parliament Ali Larijani stated that the United States and Israel had killed Rezaeinejad. The U.S. government, through State Department spokeswoman Victoria Nuland, rejected the accusation.

=== Mostafa Ahmadi Roshan ===
On 11 January 2012, Mostafa Ahmadi Roshan was assassinated with a "magnetized explosive" attached to the side of his car on his way to work, on the second anniversary of Masoud Ali-Mohammadi's murder at 8:30 am in Shahid Golnabi Street, Seyed Khandan, eastern Tehran.

According to Western intelligence sources, Ahmadi Roshan was "a victim of Israel's Mossad." "In this location, we reached the car and attached the bomb to the car and the bomb exploded near the white fence," said Arash Kerhadkish, under interrogation, as reported by the Mehr News Agency.

=== Mohsen Fakhrizadeh ===
On 27 November 2020, the alleged head of Iran's nuclear weapons program, Mohsen Fakhrizadeh, was assassinated. Mohammad Javad Zarif, Iran's foreign minister, suggested that Israel was behind Fakhrizadeh's assassination.

=== Mohammad Mehdi Tehranchi ===
Mohammad Mehdi Tehranchi, an Iranian theoretical physicist and nuclear scientist, was killed on 13 June 2025 during the Israeli strikes on the Iranian nuclear program.

=== Fereydoon Abbasi-Davani ===
Fereydoon Abbasi-Davani was an Iranian nuclear scientist and politician who was head of the Atomic Energy Organization of Iran from 2011 to 2013. He was killed in an airstrike by Israel on 13 June 2025. He had previously been wounded in an assassination attempt in 2010.

=== Ahmadreza Zolfaghari Daryani ===
Ahmadreza Zolfaghari Daryani was an Iranian professor of nuclear physics and the former dean of the Faculty of Nuclear Sciences at Shahid Beheshti University. He was killed during the June 2025 Israeli strikes on Iran.

=== Akbar Motlebizadeh ===
Akbar Motlebizadeh, an Iranian nuclear scientist, faculty member at Shahid Beheshti University, and physics lecturer at Yazd Islamic Azad University, was killed during the Israeli attacks on Iran on 13 June 2025 at the start of the Twelve-Day War.

=== Seyed Amir Hossein Feghhi ===
Seyed Amir Hossein Feghhi was a prominent Iranian nuclear engineer and academic, recognized for his significant contributions to the field of nuclear science and engineering. He was assassinated during the Israeli attack on Iran in June 2025.

== Alleged perpetrators ==
There has been speculation about the identity of the perpetrators. Iran blamed Israel and the U.S. for the assassinations. Secretary of State Hillary Clinton categorically denied any U.S. role in the killings, a denial called "plausible" by analysts given the reported lack of U.S. intelligence assets in Iran. Israel neither confirmed nor denied its role in the killings. Iranian officials also blamed British intelligence agencies. Mahmoud Alavi, Iran's intelligence minister, said the person who planned the killing was "a member of the armed forces" indirectly suggesting that the perpetrator might have been from the Islamic Revolutionary Guard Corps (IRGC). Other suspects included Iranian opposition groups such as intelligence operatives from Arab countries opposed to the Iranian government, and the United States. Also, other groups such as the MEK have been accused, although a senior State Department official later denied their involvement.

In early 2011, Majid Jamali Fashi confessed to the killing of Masoud Alimohammadi on Iranian state television, saying that he had trained for the operation at a Mossad facility near Tel Aviv. Fashi was executed in May 2012. That month, Iranian authorities announced the arrest of another 14 Iranians – eight men and six women – described as an Israeli-trained terror cell responsible for five of the attacks on Iranian scientists. Iran's IRTV Channel 1 broadcast a half-hour documentary, Terror Club, which included "the televised confessions of the 12 suspects allegedly involved in the killings of Ali-Mohammadi, Shahriari, Rezaeinejad, and Roshan, and the attempted killing of Abbasi."

According to Time magazine, Western intelligence officials confirmed the cracking of two Mossad-backed espionage rings by Iranian intelligence. Officials in the Obama administration also reportedly confirmed Israeli involvement. According to Dan Raviv, Mossad officials were "pissed off and shocked" to see their intelligence assets paraded on Iranian television. After the arrests, Iran said it was confident it had arrested all those responsible for the attacks. Time magazine said that Iran attempted to retaliate against Israel for the assassinations by launching up to 20 hastily organized attacks on Israeli diplomatic missions around the world in 2012, none of which were successful.

Israel has never publicly confirmed or denied responsibility for the assassinations, and Israeli officials have expressed readiness to employ all necessary means in the nation's defence.

Israeli defence minister Moshe Ya'alon said in an interview with Der Spiegel, "Ultimately it is very clear, one way or another, Iran's military nuclear programme must be stopped ... We will act in any way and are not willing to tolerate a nuclear-armed Iran. We prefer that this be done by means of sanctions, but in the end, Israel should be able to defend itself." Ya'alon added that he was not responsible "for the life expectancy of Iranian scientists."

The assassination campaign against Iranian nuclear scientists reportedly ended in 2013 following pressure on Israel from the Obama administration to stop the attacks during negotiations with Iran to restrict its nuclear programme. Mossad officials also reportedly concluded that the attacks were "too dangerous" for valuable intelligence operatives in Iran. The organisation has since reportedly instructed its Iranian spy network to concentrate on finding evidence of Iranian breaches of its nuclear-restriction agreements.

Although Iran ostensibly considers Israel responsible for the 2010–12 assassination campaign against Iranian nuclear scientists, uncertainty surrounds the 2007 death of Iranian scientist Ardeshir Hosseinpour. Hosseinpour was reported by Iranian authorities to have died from gas poisoning caused by a faulty heater, but a six-day delay in their announcement raised suspicions outside Iran. According to Stratfor, Hosseinpour was assassinated by Mossad using radiation poisoning; Iranian officials denied this, calling their scientists "safe." In 2014 Hosseinpour's sister, Mahboobeh, accused the Iranian Revolutionary Guard of killing him for his alleged refusal to work on Iran's nuclear-enrichment program. Mahboobeh said that she obtained the information from Ardeshir's widow.

Opposition sources in Iran claim that the Iranian government killed Massoud Ali-Mohammadi because he supported them.

In June 2025, Israeli airstrikes targeted key Iranian nuclear sites. Among those confirmed dead were Fereydoun Abbasi-Davani, former head of the Atomic Energy Organization of Iran, along with Mohammad Mehdi Tehranchi, Ahmad Reza Zolfaghari Daryani, and Abdolhamid Minouchehr. The strikes were widely reported as part of a broader Israeli operation targeting Iran's military and nuclear infrastructure.

== Reactions ==
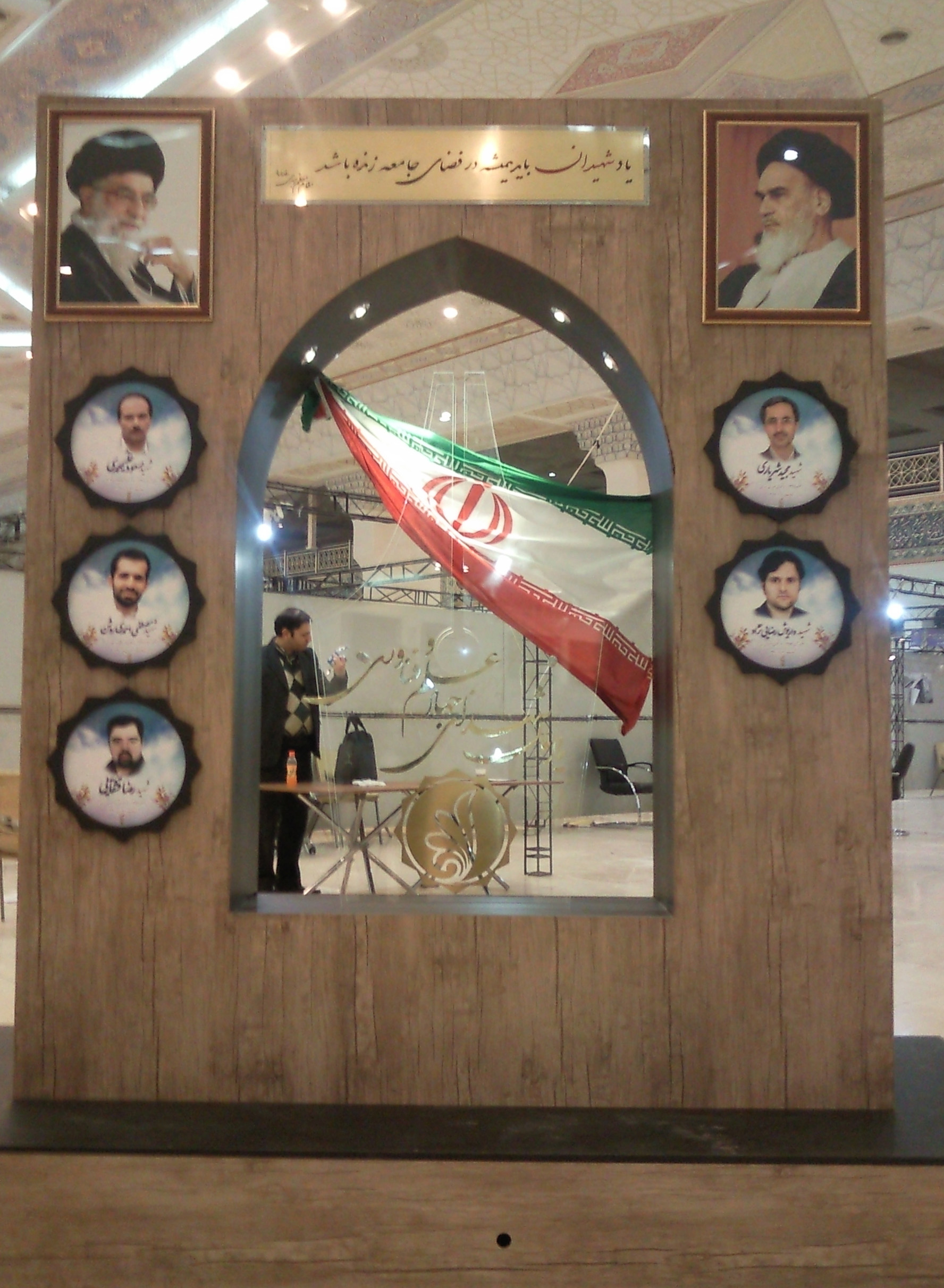
Memorial to assassinated Iranian scientists

The U.S. government condemned the assassinations without implicating any party. However, some American politicians supported the killings. Former speaker of the House Newt Gingrich supported "taking out [Iranian] scientists," and presidential candidate Rick Santorum called the killings "a wonderful thing."

Israel Defense Forces spokesman General Yoav Mordechai said that he had "no idea who targeted [Mostafa Ahmadi Roshan] but I certainly don't shed a tear." Mehdi Hasan wrote in The Guardian, "These 'men on motorbikes' have been described as 'assassins'. But assassination is just a more-polite word for murder ... How many more of our values will we shred in the name of security? Once we have allowed our governments to order the killing of ... fellow human beings, in secret, without oversight or accountability, what other powers will we dare deny them?"

Historian Michael Burleigh compared the assassinations to the Allied bombing of Nazi V2 rocket sites during World War II, noting that the bombers "were not unduly concerned whether scientists and engineers were killed too, nor foreign slave labourers provided the V2s ceased raining down on London." According to Burleigh, scientists are not abstract researchers; there are "real world" consequences of their actions, and he "shall not shed any tears whenever one of these [Iranian] scientists encounters one of the unforgiving men on motorbikes ... Except that if Israel ventures down this road, I cannot think of much of an argument to prevent Iran following them, and then anyone else who decides to follow."

Paul Koring wrote that the assassinations have reportedly had a "chilling impact" on the Iranian scientific community, making it "more difficult for the regime to recruit anyone [for] national-security research efforts". Koring also wrote that the assassinations, regardless of their effectiveness, "left a real trail of grief". Koring cited Shorheh Pirani, the widow of Darioush Rezaeinejad, who was gunned down in front of his wife and five-year-old daughter. A year after the assassination, he wrote that Armita "still draws pictures of her father. In them, she and her mother always have their mouths open in terrified screams. 'Every day', Mrs. Pirani said, 'she makes that painting.'"

Supreme Leader of Iran Ali Khamenei condemned the attacks, saying "the heinous crimes of those who try to suppress the scientific growth of the Iranian nation have been exposed. But there is no doubt that in the face of animosity, Iranian scientists, professors, and researchers will thwart the [enemy's] vicious plans... The martyrdom of these eminent scientists ... has honored the scientific community." Earlier, the leader had stated that "with their achievements, young Iranian scientists have guaranteed the future and long term energy supply for the nation, and such advancements should not be lost at any cost."

Following the first strikes of the Twelve-Day War by Israel, Iran responded with a barrage of missiles at Israel. Iran's Supreme Leader, Ayatollah Ali Khamenei, warned that Israel would face a “bitter and painful” fate in response to the attacks.

== Effect ==
In an interview with Israeli journalist Ronen Bergman, former CIA director Michael Hayden said that the most effective method employed to stop the Iranian nuclear program had been the assassinations of Iranian nuclear scientists. The assassinations eliminated people with valuable knowledge and experience and forced the Iranian government to implement strict security measures such as hunting for Mossad moles, screening equipment for viruses, and assigning bodyguards to scientists, which delayed the program by years, and caused many Iranian scientists to leave the program out of fear that they could be targeted.

== In film ==
- Bodyguard (Persian: بادیگارد) (2016) — Iranian film by Ebrahim Hatamikia about a government bodyguard who protects a nuclear scientist.

== See also ==
- 2020 Iran explosions
- Assassination and terrorism in Iran
- Assassination of Ali Sayyad Shirazi
- Israel and state-sponsored terrorism
- Targeted killings by Israel Defense Forces
- Gerald Bull
- Dariush Rezaeinejad
