= Shahram Amiri =

Iranian nuclear scientist (1978–2016)

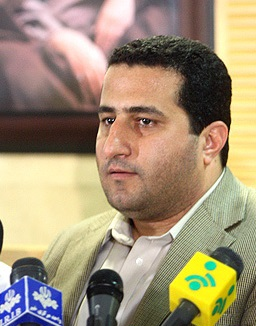
- Amiri in 2010
- Born: 8 November 1978; Kermanshah, Iran
- Died: 3 August 2016 (aged 37); Iran
- Cause of death: Execution by hanging
- Citizenship: Iran
- Known for: Nuclear program of Iran
- Scientific career
- Fields: Physics
- Workplaces: Atomic Energy Organization of Iran

Shahram Amiri (Persian: شهرام امیری Šahrâm Amiri; 8 November 1978 – 3 August 2016) was an Iranian nuclear scientist of Kurdish origin. Who disappeared from Iran during 2009–2010 under disputed circumstances, and was executed by the Iranian government in August 2016.

In the spring of 2009, he disappeared while apparently on a pilgrimage to Mecca, Saudi Arabia. On 27 September 2009, Tehran Bureau noted conflicting information regarding the date of his disappearance: the Tehran Times claimed that Amiri disappeared on 31 May, but Press TV claimed he disappeared in June. In the same announcement by Tehran Bureau, it was claimed that Amiri conducted research on particle physics at the Malek-Ashtar University of Technology in Tehran and that this institution was controlled by the Islamic Revolutionary Guard Corp.

About a year after his disappearance, two videos appeared, each purporting to be declarations by Amiri, but with contradictory stories. One showed him (or the person claiming to be him), stating that he had been kidnapped and tortured by Saudis and Americans; the other that he was in America of his own free will. In July 2010, Shahram Amiri reappeared in Washington, D.C. at the Iran interests section of the Embassy of Pakistan, seeking help to return to Tehran. Shortly thereafter he spoke at a press conference in Tehran, telling journalists he had been kidnapped, tortured and bribed to cooperate with the CIA, but had refused.

In 2009, the Iranian government accused the US government of kidnapping him. Later, the Iranian state media reported that he was working as a double agent for Iranian intelligence. After his return to Iran, American sources confirmed he had arrived in, or was taken to, the United States with the help of the CIA, but insisted he had not been taken or kept against his will. ABC News and the newspaper Haaretz suggested Amiri "wanted to seek asylum abroad." According to a 2011 report by NPR news, he "was believed to be an agent-in-place for the CIA", who decided "he wanted out of Iran", but once in the US "got cold feet" and "made his way back to Iran". Nevertheless, he was sentenced to ten years in prison after returning. Despite this sentence, he was reported as executed in August 2016, and his body was returned to his family with rope marks around his neck.

== Life and career ==
Amiri was an award-winning atomic physicist who worked at the heavily guarded facility near Qom. He was also a nuclear physics researcher at Malek-Ashtar University of Technology, a research institute closely associated with the Iranian military.

The Guardian reported that "he was an expert on radioactive isotopes for medical uses at Malek-Ashtar University of Technology (MUT), in Tehran" and reports in Iran said he "was also an employee of Iran's Atomic Energy Organisation". Press TV reported that he worked at Malek Ashtar University, but the Iranian government would not confirm that he was a nuclear scientist.

A later report by ABC News described him as a "researcher at Malek Ashtar University of Defense Technology," which according to the European Union Council, was "linked" to Iran's Ministry of Defense and "set up a missiles training course in 2003." The university's rector is a lieutenant general in the Iranian military who was "named in the UN Security Council's first round of sanctions on Iran in 2006 as one of seven 'persons involved in the nuclear program'."

== Journey to Britain ==
MI6 was tasked with getting Amiri through Europe and into the British Isles, after which he was to be transferred to the US.

== Iran's response to disappearance ==
In October 2009, Iranian Foreign Minister Manouchehr Mottaki suggested the United States may have been involved in his disappearance. On 7 October 2009, Iran's Press TV reported that Mottaki stated, "we have evidence of a U.S. role in disappearance of the Iranian national ... in Saudi Arabia. ... There is evidence to suggest the United States was involved" in Amiri's disappearance. "We hold Saudi Arabia responsible and consider the US to be involved in his arrest." In response, a United States Department of State spokesperson said only that "the case is not familiar to us".

Iranian Foreign Ministry spokesman Hasan Qashqavi stated a day or two earlier that "Amiri's fate is Saudi Arabia's responsibility." Saudi Arabia "deplored" Tehran's charge that he was kidnapped while on pilgrimage. On the other hand, in December 2009, the head of the Atomic Energy Organization of Iran (AEOI), Ali Akbar Salehi, denied that Amiri had any links with the AEOI or was ever employed by it. The disappearance is thought by some to be connected to the revelation of a second uranium-enrichment facility near the city of Qom, as his disappearance came three months before the facility was revealed in the news, raising the possibility that Amiri "may have given the West information on it or other parts of the nuclear program."

The New York Times said "sources" in Washington confirmed he was an American spy in Iran for several years, even aiding the "National Intelligence" report in 2007. He then traveled to Saudi Arabia, where the CIA smuggled him out of the country. The Obama administration said that his decision to return to Iran was an embarrassment, and it was concerned that it may undermine efforts to convince other Iranian scientists to work against the country. One official said,

His safety depends on him sticking to that fairy tale about pressure and torture. His challenge is to try to convince the Iranian security forces that he never cooperated with the United States.

The Iranian Foreign Ministry stated,

We first have to see what has not happened in these two years and then we will determine if he's a hero or not. Iran must determine if his claims about being kidnapped were correct or not.

The Associated Press also reported American officials saying he has been paid $5 million for "significant original information."

According to the Saudi newspaper Asharq Al-Awsat, Mottaki made a formal complaint to U.N. Secretary-General Ban Ki-moon about "the disappearances of Amiri and three other Iranians in recent years, some of whom they feared may have provided nuclear information to the West." One of these was Ali Reza Asgari, a former deputy defense minister and Revolutionary Guards general who vanished in Turkey in 2007, and may have defected to the US according to "subsequent press reports". According to The Sunday Telegraph, both Asgari and Amiri were part of a CIA defection program against Iran called "the Brain Drain", which began in 2005.

On 30 March 2010, ABC News reported that Amiri was initially approached via an intermediary, agreeing to defect in a "long-planned CIA operation" and was then living in the United States.

== Son's letters ==
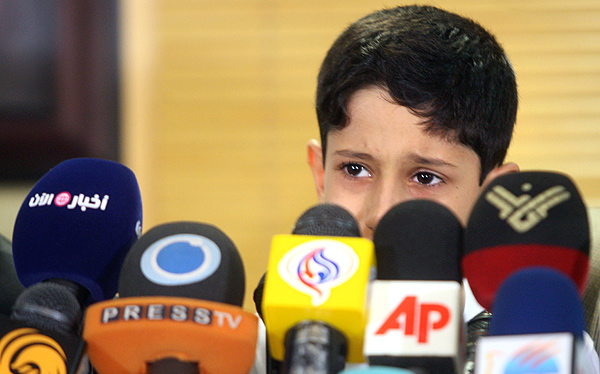
Shahram Amiri's tearful 7-year-old son interviewed by the press at the press conference in Teheran about Shahram's defection to the United States.

Having fled Iran, Amiri surfaced a few months later in the United States, was thoroughly debriefed, got $5 million, a new identity, and a new home in Arizona. On 13 July 2010, after a year in America, Amiri changed his mind and decided to go back to Iran having received several letters from his 7-year-old son Amir Hussein pleading him to return home and visit the family. His son's tearful letters were used by the Iranian officials to lure Amiri back to Iran where he was later executed.

== Torture claims ==
Having decided to return to Iran, Amiri claimed he was drugged and kidnapped by American agents in Saudi Arabia, tortured and held for years against his will.

== June 2010 videos ==
On 7 June 2010, IRIB aired a poor quality webcam video apparently from Tucson and recorded on 5 April 2010, in which a man alleged to be Shahram Amiri said that he had been kidnapped by force in Saudi Arabia through a combined effort of the American and Saudi intelligence services. He further said that after being carried to the U.S., he had been tortured and pressured to publicly state that he had willfully defected and that Iran had a secret nuclear weapon program. He called on international organizations and human rights groups to pressure U.S. for his release and expressed his wish to return to Iran.

A second video was released hours later on YouTube, in which a person who appears to be Amiri without stating whether he was initially abducted, said that "I am free here and I assure everyone that I am safe", and denied taking action against Iran. He stated that he was safe and wished to continue his education in the U.S., and that "I am not involved in weapons research and have no experience and knowledge in this field." A correspondent from the BBC speculated that he may have been reading from a script. The BBC published English-language transcripts of the two videos.

"Within days, the CIA learned that Amiri had given the Iranians a video and moved quickly to produce a version of its own. The second video shows Amiri well-dressed and manicured with a globe – turned to North America – and chess set behind him as he appears to read from a teleprompter. He says, in Persian, that he is happily living in the U.S. and going to school. He also denied having worked in the Iranian nuclear program and made a plea to his wife and son. 'I want them to know that I never abandoned then, and that I will always love them.' According to one U.S. official, the CIA intended to produce the video and launch it on the internet before the Iranians had a chance to air their version. Instead, the video languished at CIA headquarters for weeks, according to a senior intelligence official. Then, earlier this month, Iranian state television aired the Amiri video. Within a day, the CIA posted their Amiri video on YouTube, with a user identification of "shahramamiri2010".

Later in June, IRIB interviewed Amiri's wife, in which she expressed serious doubt that Amiri had gone to the U.S. of his own volition. The interview also made clear that despite more than one year of disappearance, Amiri had not contacted his wife and their seven-year-old son. She further called on human rights organizations to pressure the U.S. for Amiri's release.

On 29 June 2010, the BBC reported that Iranian state TV had shown a video of a "man who says he is an Iranian nuclear scientist" and "claims to have escaped after being abducted by US agents." In the video, the man states "I, Shahram Amiri, am a national of the Islamic Republic of Iran and a few minutes ago I succeeded in escaping US security agents in Virginia. Presently, I am producing this video in a safe place. I could be re-arrested at any time." The BBC quotes him as saying he is not free, is not permitted to contact his family, that human rights organizations should pressure the U.S. for his release, and asserting that "The second video which was published on YouTube by the US government, where I have said that I am free and want to continue my education here, is not true and is a complete fabrication. If something happens and I do not return home alive, the US government will be responsible." A US official told the AFP news agency the allegations were "ludicrous", although its state department has refused to say whether Amiri is in the US.

== Diplomatic assistance in Amiri's return ==
Reuters reported on 29 June 2010 that earlier that month, Iran, which has no direct diplomatic relations with the United States, summoned the Swiss ambassador in Tehran and handed over documents which Tehran said showed Amiri had been kidnapped by the U.S. On 4 July, the BBC reported on this development, adding that the nature of the documents had not been disclosed.

On 13 July 2010, Amiri was unexpectedly dropped off at the Iranian interests section of the Pakistani Embassy seeking assistance returning to Iran. On 14 July, the BBC reported that Amiri was "heading home" to Iran after asking to be repatriated. He returned to Iran via Turkey, as the United States has no direct flights to Iran. After learning of the developments in the case, the US Secretary of State Hillary Clinton said, "Mr Amiri has been in the United States of his own free will and he is free to go."

== Return to Iran and the reunion with family ==
According to The Wall Street Journal, an unnamed Iranian who is familiar with Amiri's case said that Iranian authorities had threatened to hurt Amiri's family if he did not return to Iran. "His family has been under tremendous pressure, they even threatened to kill his son. He had no choice but to play the script the regime has given him and return to Iran." A spokesman at Iran's United Nations' mission in New York did not answer requests for comment. The Wall Street Journal claims that his return was under threat of retaliation to his family.

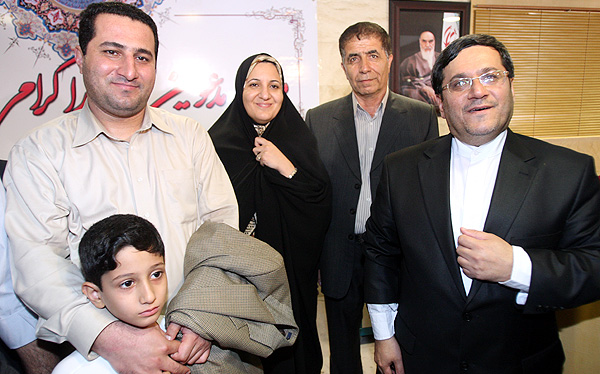
Upon his return Shahram Amiri was greeted by his son, wife and family members.

On 15 July 2010, he returned to Iran and was welcomed by Iranian officials, including Foreign Affairs Ministry officials, his wife and a 7-year-old son. At a special press conference in Tehran, he said that he had been psychologically mistreated by the US intelligence Agency (CIA) after his kidnapping. "They offered me $50 million to cooperate with them and tell the media that I am a very important person in Iran's nuclear programme and have escaped from Iran and politically that I'm a refugee to the US. They wanted me to show a laptop on the TV and say we have obtained very important information on Iran's nuclear weapon programme. But I promised myself not to tell [them] anything against my country."

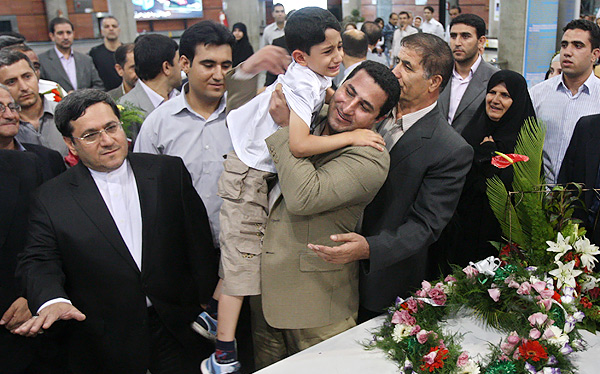
Shahram Amiri was greeted at the airport in Iran by his wife and his seven-year-old son Amir Hussein who alleged that he was tortured by the Israelis while being held captive by the CIA in the US.

After his return to Iran, the Fars News Agency claimed that he was secretly working for Iranian intelligence while in the United States. It was reported that he gathered information regarding CIA plans to gather intelligence on the Iranian Nuclear capabilities. U.S. officials disputed this claim, saying that he never had access to classified information.

Yusuf bin Alawai bin Abdullah, an Omani official involved in the September 2010 release on bail of Sarah Shourd, stated that Iran had been prepared to discuss an exchange of Shourd for Amiri but that "at the White House 'not everyone was on board.'" Bin Alawai avoided saying that Shourd's release was part of an exchange, but allowed "it may have helped" that Amiri had returned to Iran.

According to NPR news, Amiri was jailed after his arrival in Iran and in May 2011 was "on trial for treason." He was sentenced to ten years in prison. Though others say that he was sentenced to death.

On 6 July 2014, Amiri appeared in court, and could tell his relatives that he was then on hunger strike.

== Clinton's Wikileaks cables ==
In August 2016 Wikileaks released several cables of the Presidential candidate Hillary Clinton which implied that Amiri has knowingly defected to the US. In a cable dated 5 July 2010 it was mentioned that "our friend has to be given a way out". Those emails show that Amiri was a friend of the United States and a defector.

== Execution ==
On 2 August 2016, there was a last visit, where Shahram Amiri himself informed his parents of his forthcoming death; the next day, his body was returned to the family.

Amiri was executed on 3 August 2016, for allegedly providing US Intelligence with vital information about Iran's nuclear program. The news of his execution was first announced by his mother, and later confirmed by the spokesperson for the Iranian judiciary.

== In popular culture ==
In 2010, an Iranian film studio said it would produce a telefilm about the Shahram Amiri saga.

== See also ==
- List of Iranian defectors
- Dariush Rezaeinejad
- Majid Jamali Fashi
