= Majid Jamali Fashi =

Iranian martial artist (1978–2012)

- مجید جمالی فشی
- Born: Majid Jamali Fashi; 1978; Tehran, Iran
- Died: May 15, 2012 (aged 33–34); Tehran, Iran
- Occupations: Martial artist, sports coach
- Criminal charges: Assassination of nuclear scientist Massoud Ali-Mohammadi and espionage for Israel
- Criminal penalty: Execution by hanging
- Criminal status: Executed

Majid Jamali Fashi (1978 – 15 May 2012) was an Iranian martial artist, the holder of a world bronze medal in kickboxing, and was accused of assassinating Iranian nuclear scientist Massoud Ali-Mohammadi on the orders of Israel. He was executed after the trial.

In a televised confession on the Islamic Republic of Iran Television, Fashi explained in detail how he cooperated with the Mossad and how he had received training in Israel, but there were many contradictions in his confessions.

== Sporting career ==
Fashi also won the bronze medal of the 2009 Pankration World Cup as a freestyle martial artist and was the 3rd level trainer of the kickboxing style of the Iran Martial Sports Federation. Nasim News described Fashi as a martial artist who started his sport with kickboxing in Karaj, then entered the field of pankration and became a member of the Iranian national team. In 2009, he competed in Baku at -85 kg and won a bronze medal.

== WikiLeaks ==
Fashi's arrest was due to the release of WikiLeaks documents (documents of the American Embassy in Baku) according to The Times (London), which reported that the WikiLeaks documents prompted the Iranian government to arrest Fashi. According to the report, a martial arts champion told an American diplomat that the Iranian government forces martial arts instructors to train the IRGC and Basij personnels and even participate in the suppression of opposition protests. WikiLeaks explained that in the published document, there is no mention of Israel and participation in the assassination of Iranian scientists. BBC also wrote that Fashi intended to immigrate to the United States after the protests of the Iranian Green Movement, so he spoke against the Islamic Republic of Iran at the American Embassy in Baku. This publication on WikiLeaks led to his arrest by the Iranian authorities.

== Television confessions ==
On 11 December 2010, the Ministry of Intelligence of the Islamic Republic of Iran announced that it had succeeded in arresting the perpetrator of the bombing and assassination of Iranian nuclear scientist Massoud Ali-Mohammadi. In this connection, the televised confessions of "Majid Jamali Fashi" were aired on Iran Radio and Television. In the interview of this televised confessions, Fashi reportedly implicated himself. Fashi claimed he had received the training required for this assassination during a trip to Israel and courses under the supervision of Mossad agents. In another part of his televised confession, he claims that he was given training in a military barracks near the Tel Aviv-Jerusalem highway, such as "pursuing and escaping, chasing a car, gathering information from a specific place, and sticking a bomb under the car."

Some analysts of Israel's security affairs in the media of that country, by examining the details of Majid Jamali Fashi's televised confessions, have rejected his statements. Following the broadcast of Fashi's confessions on Iranian TV, Time magazine wrote: "Iran's Ministry of Intelligence has destroyed a team equipped and trained by the Mossad. Senior European security officials have confirmed that the details of Majid Jamali Fashi's confession about the January 2010 motorcycle assassination of Iranian nuclear scientist Massoud Ali-Mohammadi were correct. Western intelligence officials have declared a third country responsible for leaking this team."

== Alleging that the confessions are false ==
After reviewing the interview of Massoud Ali-Mohammadi's wife, Mansooreh Karami, with Masih Alinejad, Iraj Mesdaghi believes that the intelligence officers wrote the murder scenario shot by shot from her statements during the numerous meetings they had with Mansooreh Karami before the televised confessions was broadcast; For example, before broadcasting the defendant's television confessions, they asked Mansooreh Karami for details, or in another place where the defendant's confessions about Ali-Mohammadi and his wife's path were the exact opposite of what happened, the scriptwriters in the Ministry of Intelligence change the whole story, and finally in the defendant's television confessions and in the explanation he gave in the court, gave a different story and did not say anything about meeting Dr. Ali-Mohammadi and his wife two days before the assassination.

Mesdaghi added that "the script of Majid Jamali Fashi begins after the assassination of Majid Shahriari; That is, from November 29, 2010 to January 11, 2011, when Fashi's television confession will be broadcast." Mesdaghi cites Masih Alinejad's interview with Mansooreh Karami and says, Mansooreh Karami criticized Masih Alinejad in the first interview and said that no one was following up on her case, but in the next interview, she says, "we were not told anything at that time. After the assassination of Dr. Shahriari, the university professor who was assassinated, the officials came to us and reported." In addition, Mesdaghi considers the question and answer related to Shahriari's assassination in the court as another reason for faking the television confession after Shahriari's assassination. Mesdaghi asks, "If the matter goes back to before this date, the security authorities should answer the question why Shahriari was not protected. Those who knew that he was going to be assassinated and the accused had also confessed about the training he had received about the assassination." In the following, Mesdaghi also shows other cases of contradiction in the television confession. In 2019, it became clear that all other suspects arrested after Fashi in this case (including Maziar Ebrahimi) were later released from custody.

== Forgery of Israeli passport on TV ==
After the hanging of Fashi, the image of an Israeli passport affixed with his photo was shown on the 20:30 news program of the Islamic Republic of Iran TV. According to Fereshteh Ghazi, the photoshopped passport shown on the Iranian TV is the image of the passport that is easily available on the Wikipedia site, and the photoshoppers did not even bother to change the place of the stamps. Except for the place of the stamps, the date of issuance, expiration, month and year of birth of Fashi's passport that was shown on the Iranian TV is also the same as the sample of the Israeli passport available on Wikipedia.

According to the report of The Times newspaper, the Israeli passport attributed to Fashi had several technical problems and shows that the passport was forged by novices. The first drawback of this passport is the personal photo in which Fashi looks at a point outside the camera frame, and such a photo will never be accepted for passport issuance. On the other hand, the passport issuance date mentioned is November 2003, that is, when Fashi was purportedly only fifteen years old (contrary to the source's claim, Fashi was 25 years old on the mentioned date), but the opaque photo of Majid Jamali Fashi in this fake passport is relatively looks new and not a picture of a fifteen-year-old boy.

== Execution ==
Fashi was hanged by order of the judge Abolqasem Salavati on Tuesday, 15 May 2012.

According to Massoud Ali-Mohammadi's wife, Fashi's family was not present at the execution ceremony. The only witness to the execution was the husband of Massoud Ali-Mohammadi's sister, who said that Majid did not say a word, went to the gallows and was executed. However, the 20:30 news program of the Islamic Republic of Iran Television, broadcast new confessions of Majid Jamali Fashi and claimed that he made these confessions moments before his execution.

In 2019, Maziar Ebrahimi, who had accepted the assassination of nuclear scientists in his forced confessions on television, said, regarding the execution by hanging of Fashi, that several of those who were in the cells next to Fashi at prison, they narrated to him that on the night when Fashi was taken to be executed, he shouted loudly at the prison officers and the conversations have been exchanged between them: "Jamali Fashi tells the agents that you promised me that you would tell them that I am cooperating with you and that you will appreciate me when the main murderer is arrested; But in response to Jamali Fashi, they say no, Haji's opinion has changed and he has decided not to say this, and the martyr's wife also went to the sir (they mean Ali Khamenei, the leader of Iran) and the sir said to execute you."

== See also ==
- Assassination of Iranian nuclear scientists
- Operations attributed to Israel in Iran
- Israel and the nuclear program of Iran
- Timeline of the nuclear program of Iran
- Reactions in Iran to the Gaza War (2008-2009)
- The law countering the hostile actions of the Zionist regime against peace and security
- Death to Israel
- Israel won't exist in 25 years
- Operation Tyre
