= Dariush Rezaeinejad =

Iranian nuclear scientist (1977–2011)

- داریوش رضایی‌نژاد
- Born: Dariush Rezaeinejad; February 18, 1977; Abdanan, Ilam province, Iran
- Died: July 23, 2011 (aged 34); Tehran, Iran
- Cause of death: Assassination
- Burial place: Abdanan
- Education: PhD student in electrical engineering
- Alma mater: K. N. Toosi University of Technology
- Occupation: Nuclear scientist
- Spouse: Shohreh Pirani
- Children: 1

Dariush Rezaeinejad (February 18, 1977 – July 23, 2011) was an Iranian electrical engineering PhD student from K. N. Toosi University of Technology, who was killed in front of his home. Iran's Intelligence Minister Heydar Moslehi said he was "not active in nuclear projects and has nothing to do with the nuclear issue." However, the Associated Press news agency, in a report quoting a foreign official and a former UN nuclear inspector, wrote that Rezaeinejad's research was about high-voltage switches, which are considered an important part in the construction of nuclear warheads in atomic weapons.

In the articles presented by Rezaeinejad to the 14th, 15th and 16th Iranian Electrical Engineering Conferences, he was introduced as a researcher from Malek-Ashtar University of Technology and the title of his two articles is "Design and Construction of an Electronic Resistor as a Load with Small Inductance for a High Voltage Pulse Generator" and "Design, Manufacture and Testing of a Closing Explosive Switch".

Der Spiegel, citing an Israeli intelligence official, announced the assassination of Rezaeinejad as the first serious action of the new head of the Mossad, Tamir Pardo.

== Life ==
Dariush Rezaeinejad was born on February 18, 1977, in Abdanan city of Ilam province, Iran. He received his diploma in mathematics in July 1994. He won the first place in scientific competitions of Ilam Province several times and was accepted in Malek-Ashtar University of Technology to study bachelor's degree of electrical engineering, power major in October 1994. As soon as he graduated, Rezaeinejad started working as a researcher in important research and scientific centers of the country. In the very first year of starting work, he continued his studies in the master's course of Urmia University in the field of electrical engineering, power specialization, in the master's exam of 1999.

In the last few years of his life, while teaching and conducting research activities, Rezaeinejad was responsible for implementing many research projects at Malek-Ashtar University of Technology, Shahid Beheshti University and K. N. Toosi University of Technology. He was admitted to K. N. Toosi University of Technology by passing all the stages of the doctoral exam in 2011.

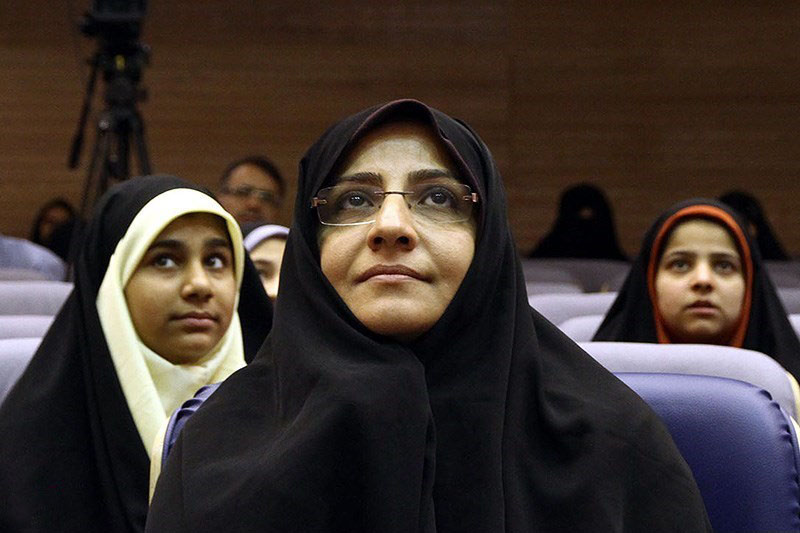
Shohreh Pirani (2016)

Rezaeinejad married Shohreh Pirani (born on January 26, 1980) in 2001. After the death of Rezainejad, Shohreh Pirani got her doctorate in political science and became a university professor. This couple had a daughter. In 2022, Pirani was appointed as an adviser to the head of the women and family affairs in Atomic Energy Organization of Iran.

== Assassination ==
Rezaeinejad was targeted on July 23, 2011, along with his wife and daughter, in front of his house and in his car while they were entering the house. Five bullets were fired at him, one bullet hit his neck and the other hit his hand.

According to his wife Shohreh Pirani, Mohsen Fakhrizadeh, another nuclear physicist, was also present when the injured Rezaeinejad entered the hospital.

== Meeting with the Secretary General of the United Nations ==
United Nations Secretary General Ban Ki-moon participated in the memorial ceremony of nuclear scientists and met their families on the sidelines of his trip to Iran in September 2012. Ban Ki-moon had come to Iran to participate in the meeting of the leaders of the Non-Aligned Movement.

== In media ==
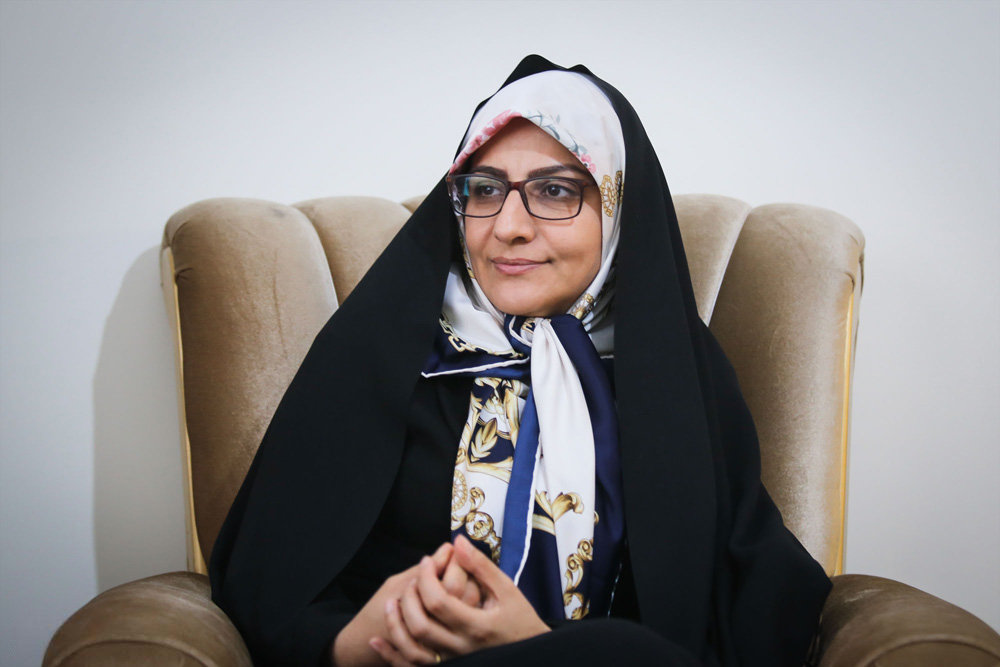
Shohreh Pirani (2016)

In 2022, the film Henas was produced by Hossein Darabi, which attempts to narrate the story of the assassination of Rezaeinejad from the perspective of his wife, Shohreh Pirani. The film is the story of a woman who is trying to save her life and her family in any way and keep it away from the dangers and chaos surrounding her husband's occupation.

== See also ==
- Assassination of Iranian nuclear scientists
- Shahram Amiri
- Mohsen Fakhrizadeh
- Ardeshir Hosseinpour
- Kamaloddin Jenab
- Hassan Sayyad Khodaei
- Ali Asghar Soltanieh
- Targeted killing by Israel
