= Kamaloddin Jenab =

Iranian physicist (1908–2006)

Kamaloddin Jenab (Persian: كمال‌الدین جناب; 1908–2006) was an Iranian pioneer physicist. He is often credited for founding academic experimental science in Iranian universities.

He was the first Iranian to obtain a PhD in nuclear physics, and is often credited for laying the foundations of that science in Iran.

Born in 1908 in Isfahan, he earned a scholarship to study abroad, taking him to France where he studied physics at Nancy-Université, chemistry at Sorbonne University, and finally culminating in a PhD from California Institute of Technology in the U.S.

Jenab studied under Robert Millikan at Caltech where he completed his PhD in Nuclear Physics in 1936. He also participated in the 1936 student Olympics, and being an avid swimmer, swam across the English Channel at the age of 25.

After returning to Iran, Dr. Jenab served as faculty at Tehran University until his retirement in 1975 after 40 years of service. He authored many of Iran's first textbooks in modern physics.

In 2004, a film was made to honor his services to Iran's physics community, and he was honored as one of Iran's founding fathers in modern science.

He died on August 26, 2006, at the age of 98.

== See also ==
- Dariush Rezaei-Nejad
