= Ali-Reza Asgari =

Iranian military officer who disappeared in 2007 in Turkey

Sardar Ali-Reza Asgari
- Born: November 1, 1952; Ardestan, Imperial State of Iran
- Disappeared: 7 February 2007; Istanbul, Turkey
- Military career
- Branch: Islamic Revolutionary Guard Corps
- Rank: Brigadier general
- Nickname: Reza Chieftain
- Unit: Quds Force
- Conflicts: Balochistan conflict; Iran–Iraq War
- Other work: Vice Minister of Defense for Logistics

Ali-Reza Asgari (Persian: علیرضا عسگری, born 1 November 1952) was an Iranian who served as a general in the Islamic Revolutionary Guards Corps, as deputy defense minister, and as a cabinet member of Iranian President Mohammad Khatami.

Asgari had been "pushed aside" from his ministerial role after President Mahmoud Ahmadinejad, a former rival, came into power in 2005. Asgari disappeared in Turkey in early 2007, and news reports indicate that he either defected to, or was kidnapped by, Western intelligence agencies. His disappearance has also led to reports that Iran would retaliate by kidnapping American or Israeli officials in Europe. According to The Sunday Times, Asgari was described as a "gold mine for western intelligence" by an Israeli defence source who claimed that they had been following him since the 1980s. On 15 November 2026, The New York Times revealed in an article that Asgari was abducted by Israel and later killed after interrogating him for information on captured Israeli pilot Ron Arad.

== Early life ==
Ali Reza Asgari was born in Ardestan, a town in Esfahan province, Iran on 1 November 1952.

== Military and intelligence career ==
In the 1980s Asgari was commander of the Revolutionary Guard in Lebanon and during the 1990s he was the top Iranian intelligence official in Lebanon, where he worked with the Shia militant group Hezbollah. One report said that during this time Asgari was involved in the alleged transfer of captured Israeli pilot Ron Arad to Iran. The Israeli website Debkafile claims that Asgari ran Iranian operations in Iraq, and is linked to the January 20, 2007 Karbala provincial headquarters raid.

=== Spying allegation ===
According to The Sunday Times, Asgari was recruited as a spy in 2003 during a business trip; however, it is not known what Western intelligence agency recruited him. He decided to defect once it was suspected by the Iranian Ministry of Intelligence that he was a mole.

=== Arrest in Iran ===
Asgari was reported to have been imprisoned in Iran for 18 months before disappearance.

== Disappearance ==
He disappeared on February 7, 2007 in Istanbul, Turkey after flying in from Damascus, Syria. One report said that he had been in Syria to discuss production of military equipment, and his trip to Turkey was to meet with a European arms dealer. A woman in Tehran who claimed she was Asgari's wife, said that Asgari flew to Istanbul on December 7 and disappeared on December 9. She also said that "He [Asgari] was doing business in olive oil in Syria."

Reports say that two other people had reserved a room for Asgari at the Ceylan Hotel in Istanbul for three nights, but that after arriving Asgari reserved a room at the cheaper Hotel Ghilan. It is not clear if he ever checked into the hotel.

Some Arab diplomats told the media that Asgari was kidnapped by the U.S. CIA and/or Israeli Mossad. On March 6, a top Iranian police chief confirmed that kidnapping was a possibility.

Reports say that Iran sent several defense officials to Turkey to discuss the matter during the last week of February, and also asked Interpol to investigate the case. Because of claims that Israel was behind the disappearance, security was boosted for Israeli embassies and senior officials abroad. On March 6 the Turkish Foreign Minister said that Turkey was conducting "an extremely broad investigation."

According to the Iranian state-run newspaper Iran, Asgari was captured by a joint team of Mossad and CIA and then tortured by them. In an interview with Fars News, Asgari's daughter said that "I'm sure that United States and Israel have kidnapped him".

=== Defection versus kidnapping ===
There has been vivid debate in the media about the question of whether Asgari defected to the west or was kidnapped. The Israeli paper Haaretz first reported that Asgari may have defected. This was echoed by a report in Asharq Alawsat, which stated that Asgari defected to the United States. That same paper reported on March 7 that Asgari was being questioned in northern Europe (later reported as a NATO base in Germany and specifically Rhein-Main Air Base) before eventually being moved to the US. However, a US intelligence official told the New York Post "We don't have him."

Asgari may have been able to leave Turkey under a different passport.

On March 8 The Washington Post said that Asgari was willingly cooperating with Western intelligence officials, and was providing information on Hezbollah and its Iranian connections. Among other things, this included information regarding the 1983 Beirut barracks bombing. Asgari also smuggled out intelligence documents and maps that detail Iranian involvement with Muslim militia groups, including Hezbollah, Islamic Jihad in Palestine, and the Iraqi Mahdi army and Badr Organization. A US intelligence official said that his defection was "orchestrated by the Israelis", although Israeli spokesman Mark Regev denied this. The New York Post reported that an Iranian dissident group helped plan the defection and is negotiating with Western intelligence agencies for a "permanent place of exile".

On March 12 the German Minister of Defense, Franz Josef Jung, was asked about the disappearance during a visit to Ankara, Turkey. Jung answered, "I cannot say anything on this issue."

According to The Sunday Telegraph, Asgari's defection was part of a CIA program called "the Brain Drain", which began in 2005 and later netted Iranian nuclear scientist Shahram Amiri.

Iranian sources and Associated Press reports say that Asgari was kidnapped by the Mossad with the help of other western intelligence agencies.

=== Family ===
Asgari was married to Ziba Ahmadi and Zahra Abdollahpour and had five children. Several sources say that some of Asgari's family left Iran before he defected, possibly under the guise of a vacation. One article said that 10 close family members left, including two sons and a daughter. This has been contradicted by Farda News, which said his wife and children were still in Tehran. On March 12, Asgari's wife Ziba Ahmadi and daughter Elham lodged a complaint at the Turkish embassy in Tehran, saying that "He has not asked for political asylum and will never do." On March 19, ten relatives including another wife Zahra Abdollahpour again gathered at the Turkish embassy, and said that "It was America and Israel who did it but... [the] Turkish government is responsible and they should inform us about his situation as soon as possible."

In an interview on July 10 with the news agency Mehr, Ziba Ahmadi said that 90% of the evidence points towards Israel being responsible for her husband's disappearance, although she has not received any information on him.

=== 2007 Iranian seizure ===
After 15 British navy personnel were seized by Iranian forces on March 23, 2007, some media reports suggested that the Iranian government wanted to trade them for Iranian personnel allegedly abducted, including Asgari.

=== Follow-up investigation ===
In April 2007, journalist Richard Miniter published an article detailing his own investigation in Turkey as to Asgari's disappearance. Miniter found that it is impossible to reserve a room at the Ceylan Hotel in cash (as was previously reported) and that no such "Hotel Ghilan" exists, although it may have been a mispronunciation of "Hotel Divan", just across the street from the Ceylan. Miniter spoke with Professor Hasan Koni of the American Studies program at Bahcesehir University, who said that senior Turkish generals were angry at not being told which ally had taken Asgari, and that the identity of this country was a hot debate among "military, intelligence, and police circles."

=== Nuclear information ===
In early July 2007 the Israeli newspaper Yediot Aharonot reported that Asgari told US interrogators that Iran is secretly attempting to enrich uranium with a combination of lasers and chemicals at a weapons facility in Natanz; this would act as a backup if the publicly known facilities and activities were stopped by sanctions or military strikes. Israeli journalist Ronen Bergman expanded upon this reporting in his book The Secret War with Iran, in which he stated that Asgari had not only supplied the information regarding lasers, but had also revealed that a second site for centrifuges had been built near the principal Natanz site, and that a Syrian nuclear program, developed with North Korean help, was being paid for by Iran.

In December 2007 when the US intelligence community released the findings of an NIE stating that Iran had stopped its secret nuclear weapons program in 2003 (as opposed to the 2005 NIE which said they were continuing), some observers suspected that Asgari played some role in providing intelligence or prompting the reassessment; however, current officials have said that there was no single thing which prompted the reversal, though another source cited current diplomatic and security officials as saying that a defector was likely to be the cause of the new information.

=== Operation Orchard ===
On September 28 the Kuwaiti newspaper Al Jareeda reported that Asgari provided information for the Israeli airstrike on September 6 in Syria, code-named Operation Orchard; this was echoed by the intelligence group Stratfor, which reported that Asgari "gave Israel the intelligence on Syria's missile program needed for the Syrian airstrike." In March 2009, Neue Zürcher Zeitung reported that after defecting, Asgari told the U.S. about the secret Syrian nuclear reactor, built in partnership with North Korea and with Iranian financing. This was reportedly the first time the U.S. and Israel were alerted of the project.

=== Ebrahimi story ===
In late March 2008, Amir Farshad Ebrahimi, an Iranian human rights activist who lives in Germany, was detained at Atatürk International Airport after an Iranian official requested that he be deported to Iran. According to the Iranians, he had played a role in Asgari's defection.

Asgari later reportedly communicated with Ebrahim from Washington, D.C. and Texas.

=== 2009 Iranian reports ===
On November 15, 2009, several Iranian websites reported details of a two-year Iranian investigation into the matter, which concluded that Asgari was kidnapped by the Israeli, British, and German intelligence agencies, and was currently being held in an Israeli jail. Earlier in October, Iranian Foreign Minister Manouchehr Mottaki had said that "The United States should be accountable as it is directly or indirectly responsible for causing problems for Shahram Amiri, Ali Reza Asgari and Ardebili".

=== "Prisoner X" theory ===
On 27 December 2010, the Tikun Olam blog claimed that a certain "Prisoner X" in an Israeli prison who had died was Asgari. The blogger, Richard Silverstein, had earlier reported that a confidential source close to Israel's Defense Minister Ehud Barak had given him the identity of the prisoner. The Iranian government subsequently reported that Asgari had died in an Israeli jail.

In 2024, Iran International reported that Asgari was alive in the United States, living under the United States Federal Witness Protection Program with the Central Intelligence Agency's protection.

== See also ==
- Shahram Amiri
