= Majid Shahriari =

Iranian nuclear scientist and physicist (1966–2010)

- مجید شهریاری
- Born: 7 December 1966; Zanjan, Zanjan, Imperial State of Iran
- Died: 29 November 2010 (aged 43); Tehran, Tehran, Iran
- Cause of death: Assassination by car bomb
- Resting place: Imamzadeh Saleh, Tehran, Tehran, Iran
- Citizenship: Iran
- Education: Amirkabir University of Technology (B.S.); Sharif University of Technology (M.S.); Amirkabir University of Technology (Ph.D.)
- Known for: Being assassinated due to his participation in Iran's Uranium enrichment program
- Spouse: Behjat Ghasemi
- Children: 2
- Scientific career
- Fields: Nuclear Engineering
- Institutions: Shahid Beheshti University; Amirkabir University of Technology; Atomic Energy Organization of Iran
- Doctoral advisor: Dr. Mustafa Sohrab-Pour

Majid Shahriari (Persian: مجید شهریاری; 7 December 1966 – 29 November 2010) was a top Iranian nuclear scientist and physicist who worked with the Atomic Energy Organization of Iran. He was assassinated in Tehran in November 2010, allegedly by Israel's Mossad.

== Career ==
He specialized in neutron transport, a phenomenon that lies at the heart of nuclear chain reactions in reactors and bombs. According to The Guardian, he "had no known links to banned nuclear work". According to Al Jazeera he "was a quantum physicist and was not a political figure at all" and he "was not involved in Iran's nuclear programme".

He was also one of the two Iranian scientists of the International Centre for Synchrotron-Light for Experimental Science Applications in the Middle East, beside Masoud Alimohammadi, another assassinated scientist. Iran asserts that its nuclear program is solely for civilian purposes, but a large number of Western and Israeli observers argue that Tehran's objective is to develop a nuclear bomb.

According to Time magazine, Majid Shahriari and Aria Tahami were "Chief Nuclear Scientists of Iran's nuclear program".

Some Iranian media reports said he taught at the Supreme National Defense University, which is run by the Iranian Army, according to The New York Times.

== Assassination ==
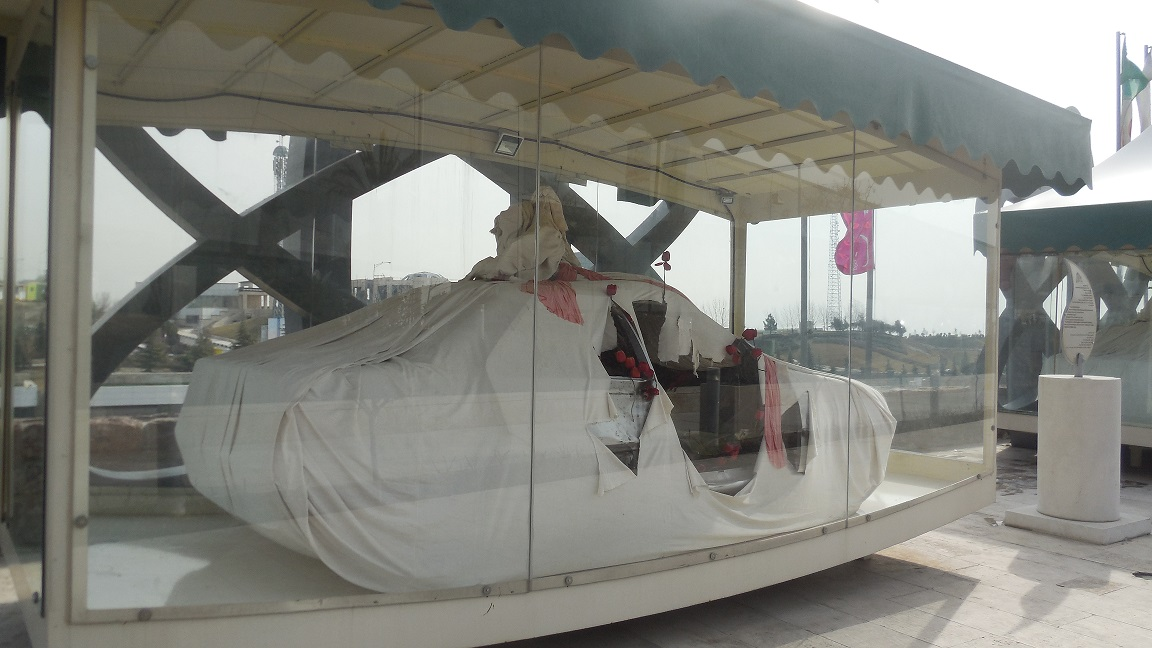
Majid Shahriari's exploded car, National Museum of the Islamic Revolution & Holy Defense, Tehran, Iran.

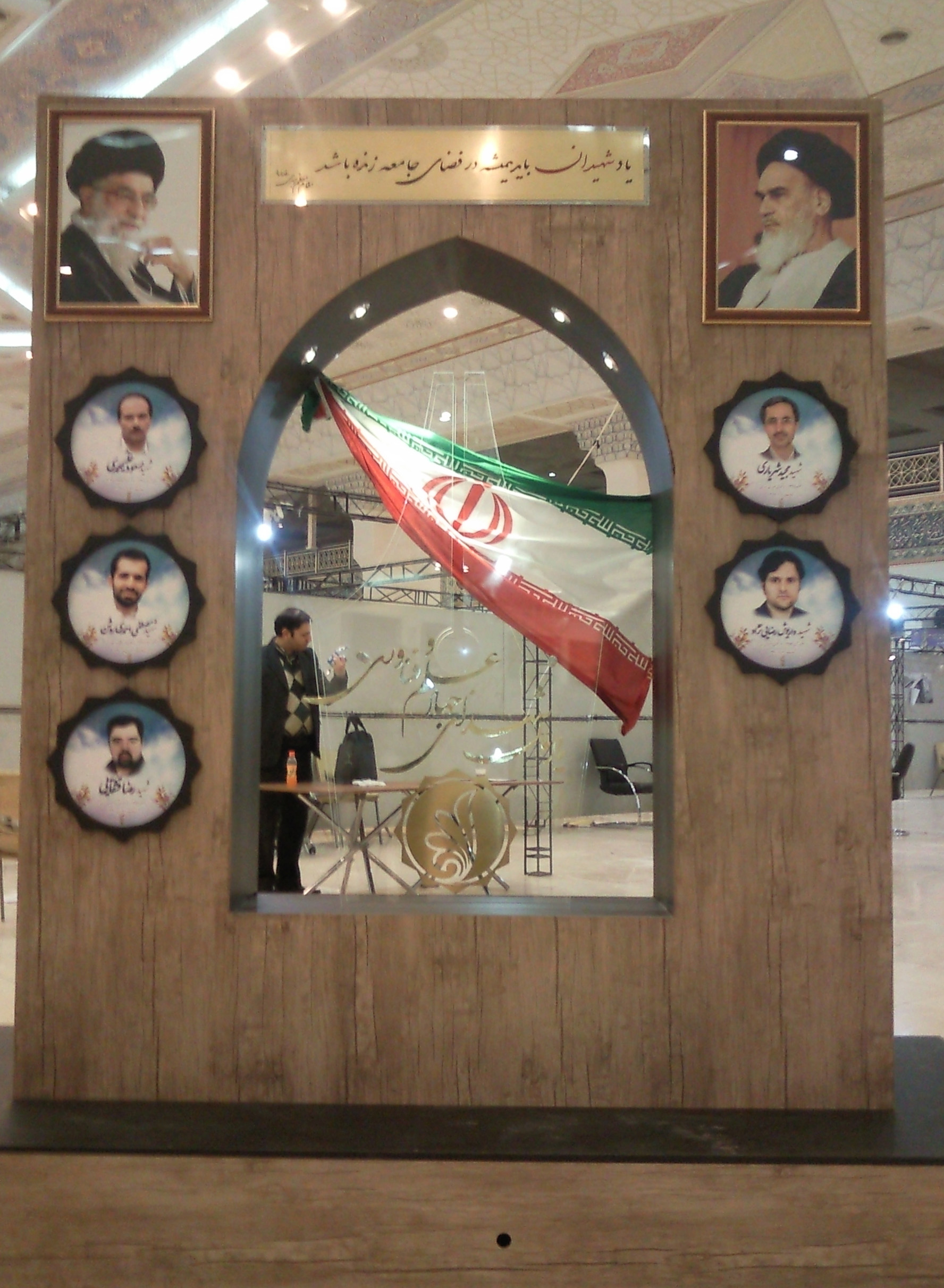
Memorial to the assassinated Iranian scientists

On 29 November 2010, assassins riding motorcycles planted and detonated explosive device using C-4 on his car door whilst he was driving. He was instantly killed. His fellow nuclear scientist Fereydoon Abbasi, a professor at Shahid Beheshti University was severely wounded. Dr. Abbasi's wife was also hurt. The killers had attached bombs to the professors' cars and detonated them from a distance. According to Time, this assassination had the signature of Israel's Mossad, which has carried out similar operations on foreign soil for decades. This killing has led to accusations that the US and Israel were trying to interfere in Iran's nuclear program.

Iranian officials have variously blamed Israel and the United States for assassinating Shahriari. Saeed Jalili, Iran's chief nuclear negotiator, was quoted as saying Western nations "exercise terrorism to liquidate Iran's nuclear scientists".

Time magazine ran an article questioning whether this action was perpetrated by Mossad (Israel's external intelligence service). According to The Daily Telegraph (UK), Israel allegedly planned to conduct covert operations against Iran, including assassinations.

A Tehran nuclear site was officially renamed after him after his assassination.

== See also ==
- Assassination of Iranian nuclear scientists
- Ardeshir Hosseinpour
- Masoud Alimohammadi
- Fereydoon Abbasi
- Daryoush Rezaei
- Mostafa Ahmadi-Roshan
