= Mostafa Ahmadi Roshan =

Iranian nuclear scientist (1979–2012)

Mostafa Ahmadi Roshan (Persian: مصطفی احمدی روشن; 8 September 1979 in Hamadan – 11 January 2012 in Tehran) was an Iranian nuclear scientist who was assassinated in 2012. He was also deputy of commerce at the Natanz nuclear power plant.

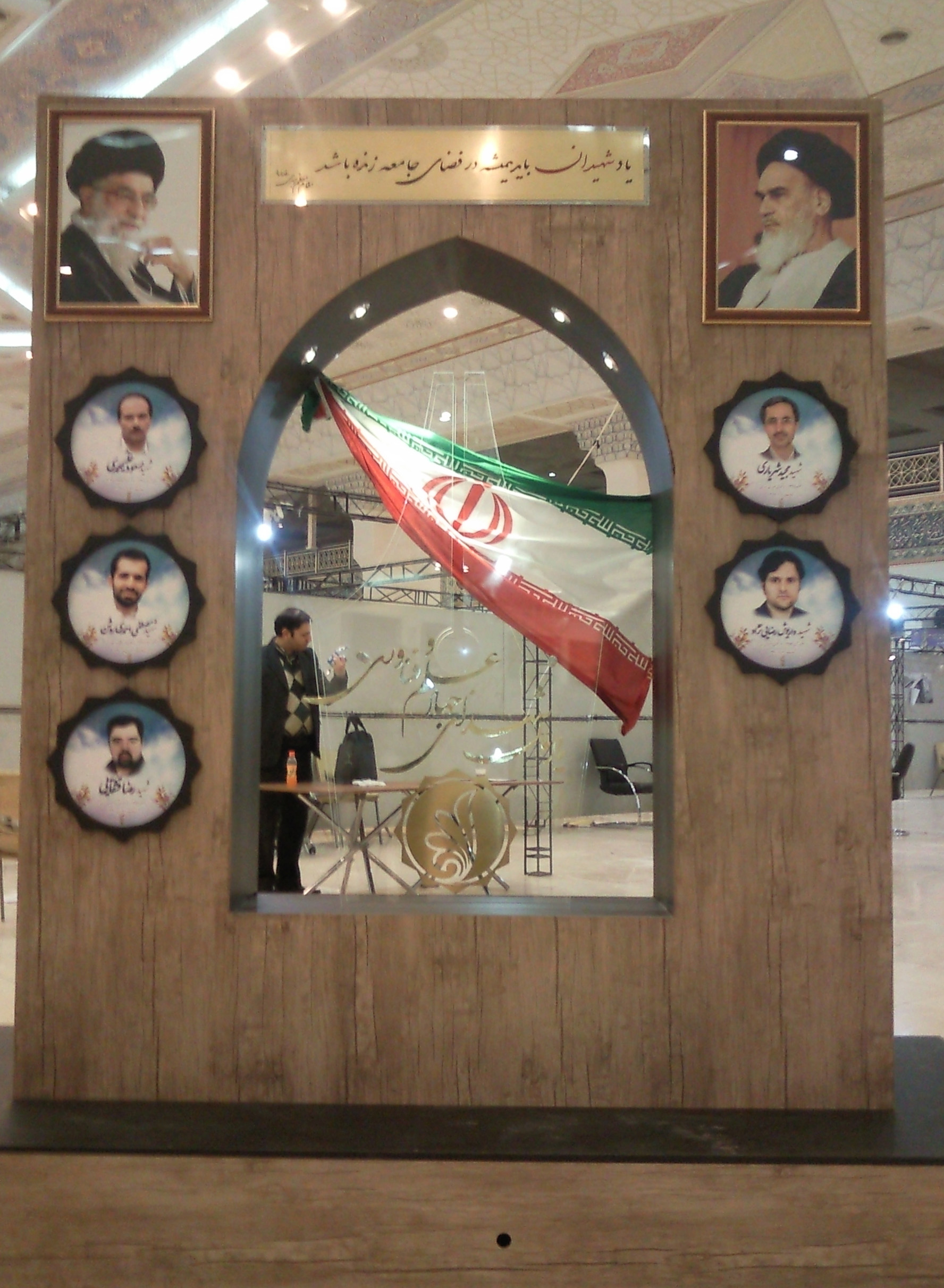
Memorial to assassinated Iranian scientists

== Life ==
Ahmadi Roshan (also known as "Shahid Ahmadi-Roshan" after the assassination, denoting his status as a martyr) was born on 8 September 1979 in the village of Sangestan in Hamedan province, and grew up in a poor family. He was among the students of Aziz Khoshvaght (who was known as an Islamic moralist), studied polymer engineering at the Sharif University of Technology, and had published several Institute for Scientific Information (ISI) articles in English and Persian by the time he was 32 years old.

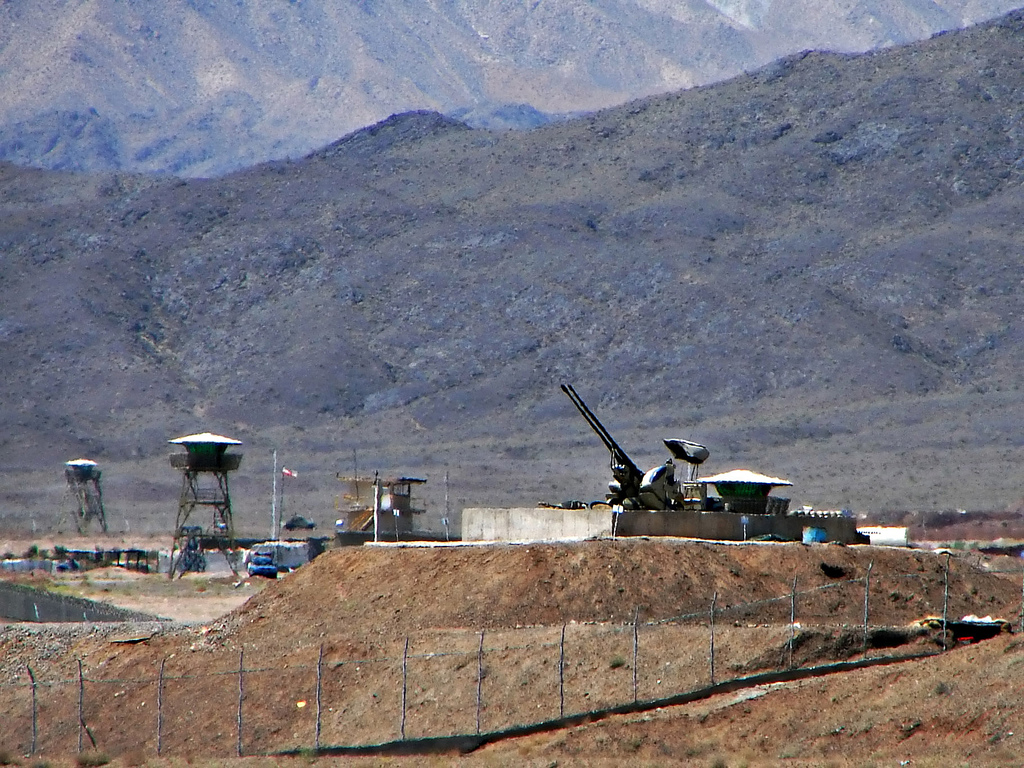
Anti-aircraft guns at Natanz Nuclear Facility (2006)

== Family ==
Ahmadi Roshan was married to Fatemeh Boluri-Kashani, who graduated with a master's degree in chemistry from Sharif University. His father was Rahim Ahmadi Roshan and his mother was Sedigheh Salari. His only child, Ali-Reza, was four years old when Ahmadi Roshan was killed.

== Death ==
Roshan was killed on 11 January 2012 by a motorbike bomb at 8:30am in the vicinity of Seyyed Khandan in Tehran. He was the last of four assassinated Iranian nuclear scientists (following Massoud Ali-Mohammadi, Majid Shahriari, and Darioush Rezaeinejad).

== Natanz enrichment site ==
In response to this and previous assassinations, a number of students from universities throughout the country sent letters to Iranian authorities, asking them to change the names of Iranian nuclear facilities and enrichment sites to those of the murdered scientists. Five of these requests were honored, and the Natanz enrichment site's name was changed to "The Site of Shahid Mostafa Ahmadi-Roshan".

== See also ==
- Assassination of Iranian nuclear scientists
- Assassination of Masoud Alimohammadi
- Nuclear facilities in Iran
- Assassination and terrorism in Iran
