= Holy Defense Museum =

Museum in Iran

National Museum of the Islamic Revolution & Holy Defense
- موزه ملی انقلاب اسلامی و دفاع مقدس; Muze-ye Melli-e enghelab-e islami ve defa'-e moghadas
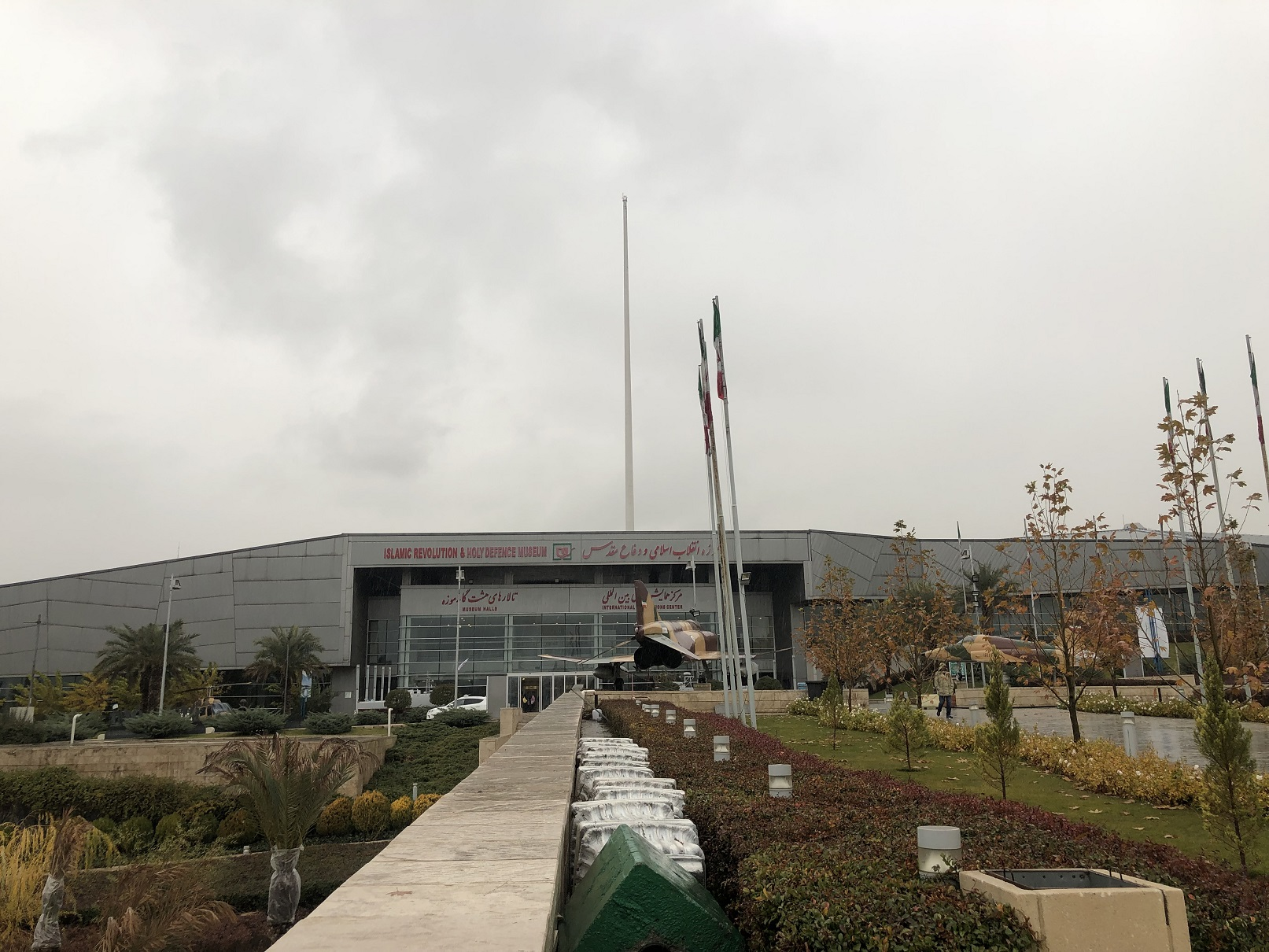
- Holy Defense Museum
- Established: 2010
- Location: Sarv Street, Haqani Highway, Vanak, Tehran, Iran
- Coordinates: 35°45′11″N 51°25′31″E
- Type: Military museum
- Director: Ali Asghar Jafari
- Architect: Zhila Norouzi
- Owner: Municipality of Tehran
- Website: iranrhdm.ir

The National Museum of the Islamic Revolution and Holy Defense (Persian: موزه ملی انقلاب اسلامی و دفاع مقدس, Muze-ye Melli-e enghelab-e eslami ve defa'-e moghadas), located in Tehran on a landscaped site of 21 hectares, is one of the largest museums of Iran. It is dedicated to the Iran–Iraq War (1980–1988), the conflict known in Iran as "imposed war" or mainly "Holy Defense".

== Museum ==
The museum consists of different parts such as Tomb of the Unknown Soldiers, flag tower, open area and lake, parking, conference halls, Khorramshahr Mosque, Library and Panorama museum. The main building of museum consists of 8 halls; each displays a specific concept of war through many monitors, video projectors, hologram showcases and some other modern technologies.
