= Malek-Ashtar University of Technology =

Public research university in Iran

Malek Ashtar University of Technology
- Type: Public
- Established: 1984
- Location: Tehran, Isfahan and Urmia, Tehran, Iran; 35°46′59″N 51°29′35″E, 32°52′49″N 51°33′10″E
- Website: www.mut.ac.ir

Malek Ashtar University of Technology (MUT) (Persian: دانشگاه صنعتی مالک اشتر, romanized: Dāneshgāh-e San'ati-ye Mālek Asht'ar) is a public research university of engineering, science in Iran. Founded in 1984, MUT's main campus is located at Tehran, the capital of Iran. Its other campuses are located in Isfahan and Urmia. The university is named after Malik al-Ashtar, one of the most loyal companions of Ali Ibn Abi Talib.

MUT provides both undergraduate and graduate programs. It is organized into more than twenty schools, colleges, and institutes, located in six centers throughout Lavizan in Tehran, Shahin Shahr in Isfahan province, Karaj in Alborz province, Fereydunkenar in Mazandaran province, Bandar Abbas in Hormozgan province and Urmia.

== History ==
In late 1981, the Iranian government brought together all military-industrial units and placed them under the Defense Industries Organization (DIO). By 1984, a large number of infantry rifles, machine guns, and mortars and some small-arms ammunition were being manufactured locally. Malek Ashtar University of Technology was approved in 1984 by the Iranian Ministry of Science, Research and Technology. It was then recognized as a university in 1984. In March 2026 during the 2026 Iran War, the Israeli Air Force bombed research and development facilities in the university.

== Campuses ==
MUT had only one campus in Shahinshahr, Isfahan. In 1999, another campus was established in Tehran and known as main campus. Its faculties include aerospace engineering, applied sciences, electrical engineering, management and industrial engineering, marine sciences and engineering, materials and manufacturing technologies and information, communications and security technologies, and rector as of 2006.

== Research ==
=== Aerospace research ===
Malek Ashtar University of Technology is among top five public universities in Iran that provide aerospace research and programs at undergraduate and postgraduate levels. (These universities includes K. N. Toosi University of Technology, Sharif University of Technology, Amirkabir University of Technology, and Malek Ashtar University of Technology. The Sharif University of Technology was the first university with an Aerospace Engineering degree since 1987. The K.N. Toosi University of Technology offered Ph.D. in Aerospace Engineering in a joint program with Moscow State Aviation Technological University in Russia.

In 2003, Iranian Space Agency was established in an uninhabited desert area in Semnan Province, southeast of Tehran. The Aerospace Research Institute affiliated to the Ministry of Science, Research and Technology is active organization in the space science and technology applications. Five public universities, one private university (Azad University Science and Research Branch), and one college (Civil Aviation Technology College) provide higher education and research in aerospace engineering.

Since the 1990s, Iran started to develop a launch vehicle based on Shahab-3. The Iran Space Research Center started testing launch capabilities since early 2007 reaching 150–200 km altitude based on Shahab-3 series. In 2008, they developed a two-stage launch vehicle Safir-1. In 2009, they launched a satellite named Omid into orbit using the domestically built launch vehicle Safir-2, making Iran the ninth nation capable of producing and launching a satellite.

=== Biological research ===
According to the Center for Strategic and International Studies (CSIS) report on the biological activities in Iran, genetic cloning is being carried out at the Malek Ashtar University of Technology. The Iran's activities about biological weapons began in 1985. By 1986, they established a research center in Tehran's Pasteur Institute to work on toxic fungus and microbial substances. The center succeeded in producing toxic fungus, and aflatoxin. In 1987, they moved the facilities to the Imam Hossein University.

== Sanctions ==
The United Nations, the European Union and American officials believe the university is involved in the nuclear program of Iran and that it has served as a cover for the organization responsible for the manufacturing of nuclear warheads. According to the European Union, inspectors of the International Atomic Energy Agency have not been allowed to interview staff. The university has been under sanctions from the United Nations and from the European Union.

== Academics ==
=== Schools and colleges ===
The main campus located in Tehran include:

- Materials and Manufacturing Technologies Complex
- Electrical and Electronics Engineering Complex
- Management and Industrial Engineering Complex
- Communications and Security Technologies Complex
- Modern Sciences and Technologies Complex
- Non-factor Defense Institute
- Aerospace Department

Shahinshahr campus include:

- Applied Sciences Complex
- Marine Science and Technology Complex
- School of Aerospace and Mechanical Engineering
- School of Material Engineering
- School of Electrical and Electronics Engineering
- School of Industrial Engineering
- School of Marine Science and Engineering

MUT has two libraries, the Dr Chamran library on the Shahinshahr campus, and the Khawrazmi library on the Tehran campus.

The university also co-operates with several independent research centers. Among those:

- Atomic Energy Organization of Iran (AEOI)
- Ministry of Defense of Iran
- Amirkabir University of Technology
- Sharif University of Technology
- University of Tehran
- University of Science and Defense Technologies (USDT)
- Baltic State Technical University (until 1998)
- China Aerospace Science and Technology Corporation
- Centers for Science and Technological Growth
- Biological Research Center of Malek Ashtar University
- Research Center for Direct Biotechnology
- Sina Industry (Vira Laboratories)
- Aerospace Industries Organization (AIO)
- Biological Research Center of SIO
- Damghan's Weapons Industry
- National Center for Genetic Engineering and Biotechnology Research
- The Institute of Biochemistry and Biophysics (IBB)
- Tehran's Biochemical and Bioenvironmental Research Center
- Group of Fermentation and Biological Technology
- Missile Industrial Group at Parchin
- Shahid Babaye Industrial Complex (SBIC)
- Mechanical Systems Industrial Group (MIG)
- Special Industrial Groups of the Ministry of Defense (MIDSPCIG)

=== Admissions ===
Admission in MUT is highly competitive and only top students may achieve this honor and all undergraduate and graduate programs requires scoring among top 1% of students in the Iranian University Entrance Exam, known as Concours (from the French; Konkoor, Konkour, and Konkur are transliterations of the Persian).

=== Rankings ===
University rankings
- Malek Ashtar University of Technology

Global – Overall
- CWTS World: 1,055 (2020)

- Top Ranks in the research tournament in Iran indicate that this university has a high scientific level.
- According to the evaluation of technical universities in Iran by ISC(Islamic World Science Citation Center), this university was ranked 8 in 2015-2016 and in 2016-2020 ranked 6-10among all the technical universities of Iran.
- In the ranking of Islamic world universities in 2022 by Islamic World Science Citation Database (ISC), this university has been ranked 301–350.
- In the ranking of world universities by CWTS Leiden Ranking in 2020(Time period:2015–2018), it has been ranked 1055.
- In the ranking of world universities by CWTS Leiden Ranking Ranking in 2021(Time period:2016–2019), it has been ranked 1077.
- The global ranking of Malek-Ashtar University of Technology in the field of engineering in 2021 in CWTS Leiden Ranking is 481
- According to the results of the World Rankings in 2022 by EduRank institute, the world ranking of this university in the fields of Metallurgical Engineering, Nuclear Engineering, Marine Engineering, Chemical Engineering, Materials Science, Aviation and, Aerospace Engineering is 525, 556, 689, 878, 888, 928 and, 1000, respectively.
- In the 2020 assessment of the Essential Science Indicators (ESI) belonging to Clarivate Analytics (ISI), Malek-Ashtar University of Technology ranked among the top 1% universities of the world with the most impact based on citations.
- According to EduRank in 2024, Malek Ashtar University of Technology is among the top 1,500 universities in the world in several engineering branches:

Nuclear Engineering :745, Marine Engineering: 778, Aviation: 920, Nanotechnology: 1020, Chemical Engineering: 1030, Metallurgical Engineering: 1071, Automation and Control engineering: 1174, Aerospace Engineering: 1287, Materials Science: 1293, Operations Research: 1378, Structural Engineering: 1386, Optical Engineering: 1475

== Student life ==
=== Residential life ===
In addition to the sports teams, fraternities, sororities, and study clubs, there are many organizations on campus that focus on entertainment, arts, and culture.

=== Groups and activities ===
MUT has many scientific societies include:

- Language Scientific Society
- Physics Scientific Society
- Chemistry Scientific Society
- Password and Encryption Scientific Society
- Astronomy Scientific Society
- Marine Engineering Scientific Society
- Materials Engineering Scientific Society
- Scientific Society of Mechanical Engineering
- Scientific Society of Aerospace Engineering
- Scientific Society of Optical Engineering
- Information Technology Scientific Society
- Electrical and Electronic Engineering Scientific Society

The Materials Engineering Scientific Society selected as the best national scientific Society by Ministry of Science, Research and Technology in 2009, 2010 and 2011. Also, MUT Physics Scientific Society was honored in Harkat National Festival and selected as a third center of excellence in Iran Scientific Society of Physics.

== Athletics ==
MUT students compete in club and intramural sports, including soccer, volleyball, basketball, badminton, tennis and ping pong. A wide variety of sports facilities are available at Malek Ashtar University of Technology. The Sports and Recreation Center serves various facilities and fields throughout both Isfahan and Tehran campuses to athletic teams.

== Notable faculty and alumni ==
- Ardeshir Hosseinpour
- Darioush Rezaeinejad
- Shahram Amiri
- Mohammad Reza Aref
- Ali Mohammadi

== See also ==
- List of universities in Iran
- Iranian Space Agency
- Iran Aviation Industries Organization
