= Ardeshir Hosseinpour =

Iranian physicist (1962–2007)

- Born: 1962; Tehran, Iran
- Died: 15 January 2007 (aged 44–45); Isfahan, Iran
- Education: Shiraz University
- Known for: Nuclear program of Iran; Electromagnetism
- Awards: Khwarizmi International Award (2006)
- Scientific career
- Fields: Nuclear physics and engineering
- Workplaces: Nuclear Technology Center of Iran; Shiraz University, Malek Ashtar University

Ardeshir Hosseinpour (Persian: اردشير حسين‌پور; 1962 – 15 January 2007) was an Iranian nuclear scientist, physics professor, and electromagnetism expert, who was involved in the Iranian nuclear program. He died mysteriously in early 2007 during his nuclear work at Isfahan.

== Education and career ==
Hosseinpour held a B.S. degree in electrical engineering and a MSc degree in Nuclear Physics from Shiraz University in 2002. He was a professor at Shiraz University, and also taught at the Malek Ashtar University of Technology in Isfahan.

In 2005, he co-founded the Nuclear Technology Center of Isfahan, where he continued his research until his death on 15 January 2007.

== Cause of death ==
There are conflicting reports on the cause of Hosseinpour's death. It was not reported until six days later, first by Al-Quds (daily news) and then by the Iranian Students' News Agency. American Radio Farda (broadcasting in Persian) originally reported he had died due to "gassing".

The United States private intelligence company Stratfor released a report on 2 February 2007 claiming "sources very close to Israeli intelligence" had said that Hosseinpour was "a long time Mossad target", and that Hosseinpour died from "radioactive poisoning" as part of a purported covert Mossad operation to halt the Iranian nuclear program. It continued

"Decapitating a hostile nuclear program by taking out key human assets is a tactic that has proven its effectiveness over the years, particularly in the case of Iraq. In the months leading up to the 1981 Israeli airstrike on Iraq's Osirak reactor—which was believed to be on the verge of producing plutonium for a weapons program -- at least three Iraqi nuclear scientists died under mysterious circumstances."

The Israeli newspaper Haaretz reported that a "website of expatriate Iranian communists" had claimed that several other scientists were killed and injured in the same incident.

Despite these reports, the "semi-official" Fars News Agency reported that an unnamed informed source in Tehran told them Hosseinpour was not involved in the Isfahan nuclear facility, and that he "suffocated by fumes from a faulty gas fire in sleep."

The report of an assassination was denied by Gholamreza Aghazadeh, head of the Atomic Energy Organization of Iran, who said that Iranian nuclear experts "are sound and safe." Mossad sources, including former Mossad chief director Meir Amit, also told the San Francisco Chronicle that the claim of assassination was "baseless" and "[went] against all known modus operandi of the agency."

According to an investigative work by an Italian journalist, Ardeshir Hosseinpour sympathised with Khatami. Ardeshir's sister, Mahboobeh Hosseinpour, claimed her brother was murdered by Iran's Revolutionary Guards and not by Israel.

In 2020, Mostafa Moeen, the Minister of Culture and Higher Education under President Akbar Hashemi Rafsanjani (1989-1993) and President Mohammad Khatami (1997-2000), asserted that Hosseinpour was killed by Mossad.

== Awards ==
- Ranked first, Defense Ministry Researchers Festival. (2004)
- Ranked second, Applied research section, Khwarazmi International Festival.
- Ranked first, Khwarazmi International Festival. (2006)

== Publications ==
- Hosseinpour, Ardeshir; Sadeghi, H. (September 2001). "Anisotropy Variation with Order-Disorder Transition in Magnetite". Physica Status Solidi B. 227 (2): 563–567. Bibcode:2001PSSBR.227..563H. doi:10.1002/1521-3951(200110)227:2<563::AID-PSSB563>3.0.CO;2-G.
- Hosseinpour, Ardeshir; Zakery, Abdolnaser (2001). "Investigation of Magnetic Force for Barium and Strontium Ferrites". Journal of the American Ceramic Society. 84 (5). Blackwell Publishing Ltd. for the American Ceramic Society: 1184–1186. doi:10.1111/j.1151-2916.2001.tb00813.x. (also abstracted at IngentaConnect, INIST-CNRS, and CSA)
- Hosseinpour, Ardeshir; Javadpour, Sirus (2005). "Fabrication of High Density Strontium Ferrites". Proceedings of the Ninth International Conference on Ferrites (ICF 9): 353–358.
- Ghasemi, Ali; Shams, M.R.; Saatchi, A.; Salehi, M.; Hosseinpour, A. (1 October 2004). "Influence of Stoichiometry and Molar Ratio of Barium Ferrite Thin Film Synthesized by Sol-gel on Alumina Substrate". Transactions of Materials and Heat Treatment. 25 (5): 1313–1315. Archived from the original on 30 September 2007.

== See also ==
- Assassination of Iranian nuclear scientists
- Nuclear program of Iran
- Dariush Rezaei-Nejad
