= 2020 national electoral calendar =

National and federal elections held in 2020

- Countries with national elections or referendums: Executive Legislative Executive and Legislative Referendum Legislative and Referendum Executive, Legislative and Referendum Legislative and Judicial Executive, Legislative and Judicial

This national electoral calendar for 2020 lists the national/federal elections held in 2020 in all sovereign states and their dependent territories. By-elections are excluded, though national referendums are included.

== January ==
- 5 January:
  - Croatia, President (2nd round)
  - Uzbekistan, Legislative Chamber (2nd round)
- 9 January: Sint Maarten, Legislature
- 11 January: Taiwan, President and Parliament
- 19 January: Comoros, Parliament (1st round)
- 23 January: Tokelau, Legislature
- 26 January: Peru, Parliament

== February ==
- 8 February: Ireland, Parliament
- 9 February:
  - Azerbaijan, Parliament
  - Cameroon, National Assembly
  - Switzerland, Referendums
- 21 February: Iran, Parliament (1st round)
- 22 February: Togo, President
- 23 February: Comoros, Parliament (2nd round)
- 29 February: Slovakia, Parliament

== March ==
- 1 March: Tajikistan, Assembly of Representatives
- 2 March:
  - Guyana, President and Parliament
  - Israel, Parliament
- 19 March: Vanuatu, Parliament
- 22 March:
  - Abkhazia, President
  - Guinea, Parliament and Constitutional Referendum
- 29 March: Mali, Parliament (1st round)
- 31 March: Artsakh, President (1st round) and Parliament

== April ==
- 14 April:
  - Artsakh, President (2nd round)
  - Kiribati, Parliament (1st round)
- 15 April: South Korea, Parliament
- 19 April: Mali, Parliament (2nd round)
- 21 April: Kiribati, Parliament (2nd round)

== May ==
- 1 May: Palau, Constitutional Referendum
- 20 May: Burundi, President and National Assembly
- 25 May: Suriname, Parliament
- 30 May: Niue, Legislature

== June ==
- 5 June: Saint Kitts and Nevis, Parliament
- 21 June: Serbia, Parliament
- 22 June: Kiribati, President
- 23 June: Malawi, President
- 24 June: Mongolia, Parliament
- 25 June – 1 July: Russia, Constitutional Referendum
- 27 June: Iceland, President
- 28 June: Poland, President (1st round)
- 29 June: Anguilla, Legislature

== July ==
- 5 July:
  - Croatia, Parliament
  - Dominican Republic, President, Chamber of Deputies and Senate
- 10 July: Singapore, Parliament
- 12 July: Poland, President (2nd round)
- 15 July: North Macedonia, Parliament
- 19 July: Syria, Parliament

== August ==
- 5 August: Sri Lanka, Parliament
- 9 August: Belarus, President
- 10 August: Trinidad and Tobago, House of Representatives
- 11–12 August: Egypt, Senate (1st round)
- 30 August:
  - Liechtenstein, Referendums
  - Montenegro, Parliament

== September ==
- 3 September: Jamaica, House of Representatives
- 8–9 September: Egypt, Senate (2nd round)
- 11 September: Iran, Parliament (2nd round)
- 20–21 September: Italy, Constitutional Referendum
- 24 September: Falkland Islands, Referendum
- 27 September: Switzerland, Referendums

== October ==
- 1 October: Bermuda, House of Assembly
- 2–3 October: Czech Republic, Senate (1st round)
- 4 October:
  - Kyrgyzstan, ~~Parliament~~ (election nullified)
  - New Caledonia, Independence Referendum
- 7 October: Guernsey, Legislature
- 9–10 October: Czech Republic, Senate (2nd round)
- 11 October:
  - Lithuania, Parliament (1st round)
  - Northern Cyprus, President (1st round) and Constitutional Referendum
  - Tajikistan, President
- 17 October: New Zealand, Parliament and Referendums on cannabis and euthanasia
- 18 October:
  - Bolivia, President, Chamber of Deputies and Senate
  - Guinea, President
  - Northern Cyprus, President (2nd round)
- 22–24 October: Seychelles, President and Parliament
- 24–25 October: Egypt, House of Representatives (1st round, 1st phase)
- 25 October:
  - Chile, Referendum
  - Lithuania, Parliament (2nd round)
- 28 October: Tanzania, President and Parliament
- 31 October:
  - Georgia, Parliament (1st round)
  - Ivory Coast, President

== November ==
- 1 November:
  - Algeria, Constitutional Referendum
  - Moldova, President (1st round)
- 3 November:
  - Palau, President, House of Delegates and Senate
  - United States, President, House of Representatives and Senate
- 5 November: Saint Vincent and the Grenadines, Parliament
- 7–8 November: Egypt, House of Representatives (1st round, 2nd phase)
- 8 November: Myanmar, House of Representatives and House of Nationalities
- 10 November: Jordan, House of Representatives
- 11 November: Belize, House of Representatives
- 15 November: Moldova, President (2nd round)
- 21 November: Georgia, Parliament (2nd round)
- 22 November: Burkina Faso, President and Parliament
- 23–24 November: Egypt, House of Representatives (2nd round, 1st phase)
- 29 November:
  - Switzerland, Referendums
  - Transnistria, Parliament

== December ==
- 5 December: Kuwait, Parliament
- 6 December:
  - Romania, Chamber of Deputies and Senate
  - Venezuela, National Assembly
- 7 December: Ghana, President and Parliament
- 7–8 December: Egypt, House of Representatives (2nd round, 2nd phase)
- 8 December: Liberia, Senate and Constitutional Referendum
- 27 December:
  - Central African Republic, President and Parliament (1st round)
  - Niger, President (1st round) and Parliament

== Indirect elections ==
The following indirect elections of heads of state and the upper houses of bicameral legislatures took place through votes in elected lower houses, unicameral legislatures, or electoral colleges:

- 6 January: Marshall Islands, President
- 16–17 January: Uzbekistan, Senate
- 22 January: Greece, President
- 23 January: Nepal, National Assembly
- 17 February and 24 November: Austria, Federal Council
- 12 March: Isle of Man, Legislative Council
- 26 March, 19 June, and 2 November: India, Council of States
- 27 March: Tajikistan, National Assembly
- 30–31 March: Ireland, Senate
- 1 April: San Marino, Captains Regent
- 11 May, 10 and 25 August, 13 September, 10 November and 10 December: Malaysia, Senate
- 13 July: Suriname, President
- 20 July: Burundi, Senate
- 12 August: Kazakhstan, Senate
- 27 September: France, Senate
- 1 October: San Marino, Captains Regent
- 25 November: Namibia, National Council
- 11 December: Madagascar, Senate

== See also ==
- 2020 in politics and government
