= Kuhgir =

Kuhgir (Persian: كوهگير) may refer to:

- Kuhgir-e Olya
- Kuhgir-e Sofla
- Kuhgir Rural District, in Qazvin Province
