= Organ =

Organ and organs may refer to:

== Biology ==
- Organ (biology), a group of tissues organized to serve a common function
- Organ system, a collection of organs that function together to carry out specific functions within the body.

== Musical instruments ==
- Organ (music), a family of keyboard musical instruments characterized by sustained tone
  - Electronic organ, an electronic keyboard instrument
  - Hammond organ, an electro-mechanical keyboard instrument
  - Pipe organ, a musical instrument that produces sound when pressurized air is driven through a series of pipes
  - Fairground organ, an automatic mechanical organ designed to provide loud music in fairground settings
  - Street organ, a mobile, automatic mechanical pneumatic organ played by an organ grinder
  - Theatre organ, a pipe organ originally designed specifically for imitation of an orchestra
    - BBC Theatre Organ, several theatre organs used for popular BBC radio programmes
    - Pump Organ, a small free-reed organ, also known as the melodeon, not to be confused with the diatonic button accordion often called by the same name.

== Entertainment ==
- Harry "Snapper" Organs, a fictional characterization of a police superintendent from a 1970 Monty Python sketch.

=== Films ===
- Organ (film), a 1996 Japanese film about organ thieves
- The Organ (film), a 1965 Slovak film

=== Music ===
- The Organ (band), a Canadian rock band 2001–2006
- Organ (album), a 2021 album by Dimension
- "Organs", a 2003 song by Moe from Wormwood.
- "Organs", a 2006 song by The Black Maria on the MVP Baseball (video game series) soundtrack.
- "Organs", a 2015 song by Of Monsters and Men from Beneath the Skin.

== Periodicals ==
- Organ, any official periodical (i.e., magazine, newsletter, or similar publication) of an organization
- Organ (magazine), a UK music magazine founded in 1986
- The Organ (magazine), a quarterly publication for organ enthusiasts, founded in 1921
- The Organ (newspaper), an underground newspaper published in San Francisco from 1970 to 1972

== Places ==
=== United States ===
- Organ, New Mexico, an unincorporated community
- Organ Mountains, New Mexico
- The Organ (Arches National Park), a butte in Utah
- The Organ (Zion National Park), a summit in Utah
- Organ Rock Formation, in Utah, New Mexico and Arizona
- Organ Cave, Virginia

=== Elsewhere ===
- Organ Peak, Graham Land, Antarctica
- Serra dos Órgãos, or Organ Range, a mountain range in Brazil
- Organ, Hautes-Pyrénées, a commune in France
- Organ, Iran, a village in Chaharmahal and Bakhtiari Province, Iran
- Organ-e Kord, a village in Qazvin Province, Iran
- Organ-e Tork, a village in Qazvin Province, Iran

== Other uses ==
- Organ, a division within an organization, for example, organs of United Nations
- Organs of state, branches of power within a government
- Organ, an old word for a mental faculty, particularly in the context of phrenology
- Organ, a slang word for a penis
- Organ (surname), a list of people with the surname

== See also ==
- Oregon, a U.S. state
