= List of elections in 2020 =

The following elections were scheduled to occur in 2020. The International Foundation for Electoral Systems maintains a comprehensive list of upcoming elections on its E-Guide Platform. The National Democratic Institute also maintains a calendar of elections around the world in the countries in which the organization works.

This list contains the dates and nature of different national, regional and municipal elections in each country.

- 2020 International Criminal Court judges election
- 2020 United Nations Security Council election 17–18 June 2020

== Africa ==
- 2020 Beninese municipal elections 17 May 2020
- 2020 Comorian legislative election 19 January and 23 February 2020
- Cameroon
  - 2020 Cameroonian parliamentary election 9 February 2020
  - 2020 Cameroonian municipal elections 9 February 2020
- 2020 Togolese presidential election 22 February 2020
- Guinea
  - 2020 Guinean legislative election 22 March 2020
  - 2020 Guinean constitutional referendum 22 March 2020
  - 2020 Guinean presidential election 18 October 2020
- 2020 Malian parliamentary election 29 March and 19 April 2020
- 2020 Burundian general election 20 May 2020
- 2020 Malawian presidential election 23 June 2020
- 2020 Seychellois general election 22-24 October 2020
- 2020 Egyptian parliamentary election 24-25 October and 7-8 November 2020
- 2020 Tanzanian general election 28 October 2020
- 2020 Ivorian presidential election 31 October 2020
- 2020 Burkinabé general election 22 November 2020
- 2020 Ghanaian general election 7 December 2020
- Liberia
  - 2020 Liberian by-elections, 8 December 2020
  - 2020 Liberian senate election 8 December 2020
  - 2020 Liberian constitutional referendum 8 December 2020
- 2020–21 Nigerien general election 27 December 2020
- 2020–21 Central African general election 27 December 2020

== Asia ==
- 2020 Abkhazian presidential election 22 March 2020
- 2019-20 Uzbek parliamentary election 22 December 2019 and 5 January 2020
- 2020 Azerbaijani parliamentary election 9 February 2020
- 2020 Egyptian parliamentary election 24-25 October and 7-8 November 2020
- Taiwan
  - 2020 Taiwanese general election 11 January 2020
    - 2020 Taiwanese presidential election
    - 2020 Taiwanese legislative election
  - 2020 Kaohsiung mayoral by-election 15 August 2020
- 2020 Nepalese National Assembly election 23 January 2020
- 2020 elections in India
  - 2020 Delhi Legislative Assembly election 8 February 2020
  - 2020 Bihar Legislative Assembly election 28 October, 3 and 7 November 2020
- 2020 Tajik parliamentary election 1 March 2020
- 2020 South Korean legislative election 15 April 2020
- 2020 Mongolian legislative election 24 June 2020
- 2020 Singaporean general election 10 July 2020
- 2020 Sri Lankan parliamentary election 5 August 2020
- Malaysia:
  - 2020 Sabah state election 26 September 2020
- 2020 Kyrgyz parliamentary election 4 October 2020
- 2020 Tajik presidential election 11 October 2020
- 2020 Myanmar general election 8 November 2020
- 2020 Indonesian local elections 9 December 2020

== Europe ==
- Croatia:
  - 2019–20 Croatian presidential election 22 December 2019 and 5 January 2020
  - 2020 Croatian parliamentary election 5 July 2020
- 2020 Greek presidential election 22 January 2020
- 2020 Irish general election 8 February 2020
- 2020 Azerbaijani parliamentary election 9 February 2020
- 2020 Hamburg state election 23 February 2020
- 2020 Slovak parliamentary election 29 February 2020
- 2020 Artsakhian general election 31 March and 14 April 2020
- Czech Republic:
  - 2020 Teplice by-election 5-6 and 12-13 June 2020
  - 2020 Czech regional elections 2-3 October 2020
  - 2020 Czech Senate election 2-3 October 2020
- Serbia:
  - 2020 Serbian parliamentary election 21 June 2020
  - 2020 Serbian local elections 21 June 2020
- 2020 Icelandic presidential election 27 June 2020
- 2020 French municipal elections 15 March and 28 June 2020
- Spain:
  - 2020 Basque regional election 12 July 2020
  - 2020 Galician regional election 12 July 2020
- 2020 Polish presidential election 28 June and 12 July 2020
- 2020 North Macedonian parliamentary election 15 July 2020
- 2020 Belarusian presidential election 9 August 2020
- Montenegro
  - 2020 Montenegrin municipal elections 30 August 2020
  - 2020 Montenegrin parliamentary election 30 August 2020
- 2020 Liechtenstein referendum 30 August 2020
- Italy:
  - 2020 Italian regional elections 26 January and 20-21 September 2020
    - 2020 Emilia-Romagna regional election 26 January 2020
    - 2020 Calabrian regional election 26 January 2020
    - 2020 Valdostan regional election 20-21 September 2020
    - 2020 Apulian regional election 20-21 September 2020
    - 2020 Campania regional election 20-21 September 2020
    - 2020 Ligurian regional election 20-21 September 2020
    - 2020 Marche regional election 20-21 September 2020
    - 2020 Tuscan regional election 20-21 September 2020
    - 2020 Venetian regional election 20-21 September 2020
  - 2020 Italian constitutional referendum 20-21 September 2020
  - 2020 Italian by-elections, 23 February and 1 March 2020
- Austria:
  - 2020 Viennese state election 11 October 2020
- Northern Cyprus:
  - 2020 Northern Cypriot constitutional referendum 11 October 2020
  - 2020 Northern Cypriot presidential election 11 and 18 October 2020
- 2020 Lithuanian parliamentary election 11 and 25 October 2020
- Portugal:
  - 2020 Azorean regional election 25 October 2020
- 2020 Ukrainian local elections 25 October 2020
- 2020 Bosnian municipal elections 15 November 2020
- 2020 Moldovan presidential election 1 and 15 November 2020
- 2020 Georgian parliamentary election 31 October and 21 November 2020
- 2020 Romanian legislative election 6 December 2020
- United Kingdom:
  - 2020 by-elections to the House of Lords 31 December 2020

== North America ==
- 2020 Sint Maarten general election 9 January 2020
- 2020 Costa Rican municipal elections 2 February 2020
- 2020 Dominican Republic municipal elections 15 March 2020
- 2020 Saint Kitts and Nevis general election 5 June 2020
- 2020 Anguillian general election 29 June 2020
- 2020 Dominican Republic general election 5 July 2020
- 2020 Trinidad and Tobago general election 10 August 2020
- 2020 Jamaican general election 3 September 2020
- 2020 Bermudian general election 1 October 2020
- 2020 United States elections
  - 2020 Democratic Party presidential primaries 3 February–11 August 2020
  - 2020 Republican Party presidential primaries 3 February–11 August 2020
  - 2020 United States gubernatorial elections, 3 November 2020
  - 2020 United States House of Representatives elections, 3 November 2020
  - 2020 United States presidential election, 3 November 2020
  - 2020 United States Senate elections, 3 November 2020
  - 2020 United States state legislative elections, 3 November 2020
  - 2020 Puerto Rico gubernatorial election, 3 November 2020
- 2020 Sint Eustatius general election 21 October 2020
- 2020 Canadian electoral calendar
  - 2020 Nunatsiavut presidential election 6 October 2020
  - 2020 New Brunswick general election 14 September 2020
  - 2020 British Columbia general election 24 October 2020
  - 2020 Saskatchewan general election 26 October 2020
- 2020 Vincentian general election 5 November 2020
- 2020 Belizean general election 11 November 2020

== South America ==
- 2020 Peruvian parliamentary election 26 January 2020
- 2020 Guyanese general election 2 March 2020
- 2020 Surinamese general election 25 May 2020
- 2020 Falkland Islands electoral system referendum 24 September 2020
- 2020 Bolivian general election 18 October 2020
- 2020 Chilean national plebiscite 25 October 2020
- 2020 Brazilian municipal elections 15 and 29 November 2020
- 2020 Venezuelan parliamentary election 6 December 2020

== Middle East ==
- 2020 Iranian legislative election 21 February and 11 September 2020
- 2020 Israeli legislative election 2 March 2020
- 2020 Syrian parliamentary election 19 July 2020
- 2020 Jordanian general election 10 November 2020
- 2020 Kuwaiti general election 5 December 2020

== Oceania ==
- 2020 Tokelauan general election 23 January 2020
- 2020 Vanuatuan general election 19–20 March 2020
- 2020 Kiribati parliamentary election 14 and 21 April 2020
- 2020 Palauan constitutional referendum 1 May 2020
- 2020 Niuean general election 30 May 2020
- 2020 Kiribati presidential election 22 June 2020
- Australia
  - 2020 Eden-Monaro by-election 4 July 2020
  - 2020 Tasmanian Legislative Council periodic election 1 August 2020
  - 2020 Northern Territory general election 22 August 2020
  - 2020 Australian Capital Territory election 17 October 2020
  - 2020 Queensland state election 31 October 2020
  - 2020 Groom by-election 28 November 2020
- Papua New Guinea
  - 2020 Bougainvillean general election 12 August to 1 September 2020
- 2020 New Caledonian independence referendum 4 October 2020
- 2020 New Zealand general election 17 October 2020
  - 2020 New Zealand cannabis referendum 17 October 2020
  - 2020 New Zealand euthanasia referendum 17 October 2020
- 2020 Palauan general election 3 November 2020
  - 2020 Palauan presidential election 22 September and 3 November 2020
