= Gugir =

Gugir (Persian: گوگير) may refer to:

- Gugir, Fars
- Gugir-e Olya, Qazvin Province
- Gugir-e Sofla, Qazvin Province
