= Sanjan =

Sanjan or Sangan or Zangan (Persian: سنگان) may refer to:

- Sanjan (Khorasan), a historic city in present-day Turkmenistan
- Sanjan, Gujarat, a town in Gujarat state, India, named by Zoroastrian immigrants after the Sanjan in Khorasan
- Sangan, Pakistan, a town in Balochistan province, Pakistan
- Sangan-e Olya, a village in Qazvin province, Iran
- Sangan-e Sofla, Qazvin, a village in Qazvin province, Iran
- Sangan, Razavi Khorasan, a city in Razavi Khorasan province, Iran
- Sangan-e Bala Khvaf, a village in Razavi Khorasan province, Iran
- Sangan, South Khorasan, a village in South Khorasan province, Iran
- Sangan, Chabahar, a village in Sistan and Baluchistan province
- Sangan, Tehran, a village in Tehran province, Iran
- Sengan, West Azerbaijan, a village in West Azerbaijan province, Iran
- Zangan, West Azerbaijan, a village in West Azerbaijan province, Iran
- Sangan District, a district in Razavi Khorasan province, Iran

Sanjan is also:

- Qissa-i Sanjan, an account of the early years of Zoroastrian settlers in India
- the Sanskrit word for 'Creator', and thus the stock epithet of Brahma
- the Persian name for Xinjiang, China, which is part of historical Khorasan
- an area in the Loliondo Game Controlled Area in the eastern Serengeti in Tanzania

== See also ==
- Zanjan (disambiguation)
- Sanjana (disambiguation)
