= Qarkhun =

Qarkhun or Karkhan or Kar-Khun (Persian: قارخون) may refer to:

- Qarkhun, East Azerbaijan
- Karkhan, Markazi
- Qarkhun, Qazvin
