= Ardak (disambiguation) =

Ardak may refer to:

== Given name ==
- Ardak Amirkulov (1955–2026), Kazakh film director
- Ardak Maratova (born 1994), Kazakh volleyball player

== Places ==
- Ardak, Qazvin, Qazvin province, Iran
- Ardak, Razavi Khorasan
- Ardak, Gonabad, Razavi Khorasan province
