= 2020 in politics =

These are some of the notable events relating to politics in 2020.

== January ==
- January 1
  - All works published in 1924, except for some sound recordings, are now in the public domain in the United States.
  - Crowds of protesters breach the US embassy compound in Baghdad, Iraq, and then withdrew after US Marines fired tear gas. The unrest occurred in response to US airstrikes on pro-Iranian militias in Iraq.
  - Recreational marijuana becomes legal in Illinois, United States.
  - State laws on bail, the gig economy, minimum wages, data privacy, and red flag gun control take effect in several U.S. states, that includes California, New York, Colorado, Nevada, and Hawaii.
  - Several new federal regulations take effect in the US as of this date, including new regulations on retirement funds, minimum wage rules, and overtime rules.
- January 2
  - The government of New South Wales, Australia, declares a State of emergency to take effect January 3 as bushfires rage, threatening human lives and property as well as wiping out as many as 500 million animals.
  - 750 US troops prepare to be deployed to Iraq to defend US Embassy in Baghdad.
  - Turkey reports a new refugee influx and possible crisis, as 250,000 Syrians flee Syria for Turkey, due to Syrian government attacks on rebel groups around Idlib.
  - Zoran Zaev, the prime minister of North Macedonia, resigns. Oliver Spasovski is interim prime minister until a new government can be organized after the April 12 election.
  - A female-majority cabinet is sworn in for the first time in Austria. It is also the first time The Greens – The Green Alternative forms part of the ruling coalition, in alliance with the conservative Austrian People's Party.
- January 3
  - President Donald Trump approves the targeted killing of Iranian general Qasem Soleimani and Iraqi paramilitary leader Abu Mahdi al-Muhandis in Baghdad, Iraq. Fears of a conflict between Iran and the U.S. results in World War III trending on Twitter.
  - Spain's electoral commission prohibits Catalan president Quim Torra from serving in the regional parliament.
- January 4 – An airstrike against the military academy south of Tripoli, Libya, kills 16 and wounds 37.
- January 5 – Former Prime Minister Zoran Milanović defeats President Kolinda Grabar-Kitarović with 53% of the vote in the 2020 Croatian Presidential Election.
- January 6
  - Australian Prime Minister Scott Morrison acknowledges that climate change plays a role in Australia's bushfires, in a reversal of his previous stance.
  - US House Speaker Nancy Pelosi announces she will introduce a resolution to limit President Trump's ability to take actions against Iran.
  - At a meeting of the Lima Group, Argentina and Mexico abstain from supporting Juan Guaidó as president of the General Assembly of Venezuela.
- January 7 – Pedro Sánchez takes office as President of the Government of Spain on a vote of 167 in favor, 165 against, and 18 abstentions.
- January 8
  - Two U.S. military bases in Iraq are hit with a dozen missiles fired by Iran; no casualties or serious damage reported. U.S. President Donald Trump says Iran "appears to be standing down" after the killing of Qasem Soleimani but announces new sanctions against Iran.
  - As many as 25 Crore (250 million) people join a general strike in India in response to Bharat Bandh labor reforms.
- January 9 – The International Olympic Committee bans political gestures by athletes at the 2020 Summer Olympics.
- January 10
  - On January 11, 2020, Russia announced that a ceasefire had been agreed to in the area of Idlib and Northwest Syria, between Russia, Syria, Syrian rebels and Turkey. This was due to requests by Turkey for a ceasefire, in order to stop the flood of Syrian refugees into Turkey. However, some regional news outlets reported that Syria launched further attacks near Idlib, in Maarat al-Numan district and the villages of Maar Shoreen, Talmenes, and Maar Shamshah, even after the ceasefire had officially begun.
- January 11
  - Taiwanese general election: Progressive Tsai Ing-Wen is reelected with 7.8 million votes (90% of the votes counted).
  - Legislators in Northern Ireland form a government for the first time since the Executive of the 5th Northern Ireland Assembly collapsed in January 2017.
  - Iran takes responsibility for "unintentionally" shooting down Ukraine International Airlines Flight 752 that killed 176 people on January 8. Canadian Prime Minister Justin Trudeau demands "transparency and justice for the families and loved ones of the victims."
  - British police say it was an "error of judgment" to label 'Extinction Rebellion' a terrorist group.
- January 12
  - 13,000 participate in a "Run Against Dictatorship" in Bangkok, demanding that Thai prime minister Prayut Chan-o-cha step down.
  - A nuclear alert about Pickering Nuclear Generating Station was erroneously sent to millions in Ontario, Canada.
  - Same-sex couples can legally register for marriage in Northern Ireland.
- January 14
  - Alejandro Giammattei is inaugurated as President of Guatemala.
  - Japanese Deputy Prime Minister Taro Aso is under fire for describing Japan as a single race and single language country, ignoring 200,000 indigenous Ainu people and 760,000 ethnic Koreans.
  - New Guatemalan President Alejandro Giammattei takes office after a five-hour delay due to protests. Outgoing president Morales is pelted with eggs.
- January 15
  - The Prime Minister of Russia, Dmitry Medvedev announces that the entire Russian government will resign. This occurred due to a proposal from Putin for new laws and reforms that would vastly increase his power.
  - U.S. Speaker of the United States House of Representatives Nancy Pelosi names the seven managers of the impeachment team and the House votes to send its impeachment resolutions to the Senate for a trial of President Donald Trump.
  - Filipe Nyusi is sworn in for another term as president of Mozambique while the opposition boycotts the ceremony amidst charges of electoral fraud.
  - Turkey lifts its ban on Wikipedia, due to a ruling by the Turkish High Constitutional Court.
- January 16
  - Pope Francis names Italian lawyer Francesca Di Giovanni as the under-secretary in the Section for Relations with States, the arm of the Catholic church that handles the foreign relations of the Holy See. She is the first woman appointed to a post at that level.
  - The impeachment of Donald John Trump formally moves into its trial phase in the United States Senate.
  - Guatemala breaks off diplomatic relations with Venezuela
  - Mikhail Vladimirovich Mishustin is appointed as Prime Minister of Russia. He previously served as Director of the Federal Tax Service from 2010 to 2020. He was nominated for Prime Minister of the Russian Federation by President Vladimir Putin. Hearings on his appointment were held in the State Duma on January 16, and he was confirmed to the office that day.
- January 18
  - French police called for backup as protesters tried to storm a theater where President Emmanuel Macron and his wife were watching The Fly.
  - Turkey President Recep Tayyip Erdoğan urges leaders of the European Union to support the government of Libya in peace talks in Berlin. Libyan opposition leader General Khalifa Haftar seeks support in Greece.
  - Violence escalates in Beirut, Lebanon, with 377 protesters and 142 members of security forces injured during nine hours of clashes; 43 people were arrested and later released.
- January 20 – Norway's ruling coalition falls apart after repatriation of Islamic State of Iraq and the Levant (ISIL) bride.
- January 22 – Katerina Sakellaropoulou is elected the first female president of Greece.
- January 23 – U.S. Treasury Secretary Steven Mnuchin, 58, says Greta Thunberg, 17, should study economics if she wants to talk about climate change. Mnunchin has a bachelor's degree in economics.
- January 26 – 2020 Peruvian parliamentary election. No party wins a majority, but centrists dominate.
- January 27
  - Manzoor Pashteen, a leading activist against corruption in the Pakistani military, is arrested.
- January 31 – The United Nations Security Council approves an extension of an arms embargo against the Central African Republic only until July 31, 2020.

== February ==
- February 1 – Palestinian leader Mahmoud Abbas threatens to cut security ties to the United States and Israel.
- February 3
  - The Supreme Court nullifies the results of the 2019 Malawian general election due to widespread irregularities. President Peter Mutharika will stay in power until new elections on July 2, 2020.
  - "Technical irregularities" delay the vote counting of the Iowa Democratic caucuses, the first step in the 2020 Democratic Party presidential primaries in the United States.
- February 5
  - Thomas Kemmerich of the Free Democratic Party (FDP) is elected governor of Thuringia, Germany, with support from the AfD party. This is the first time in modern history that a state governor has been elected with the support of the far-right AfD.
  - The US Senate voted on whether or not to convict the president on the charges and evidence as they were presented and debated upon. The senators voted 52 to 48 to find President Trump not guilty on the charge of abuse of power (all 45 Democrats, independent senators Bernie Sanders and Angus King, and Republican senator Romney voted guilty). They voted 53 to 47, in a party line vote, to find him not guilty on the charge of obstruction of Congress
- February 9
  - Sudanese leader Abdel Fattah Abdelrahman Burhan meets with Prime Minister Benjamin Netanyahu of Israel.
  - Former deputy Prime Minister Mubarak al-Fadil al-Mahdi of Sudan states that it would be good to normalize relations with Israel.
- February 11
  - Palestinians withdraw their request for the UN Security Council to discuss the proposed peace plan offered by the Trump Administration of the United States.
  - President Trump submits a new federal budget for the upcoming fiscal year. It would increase defense spending and cut social programs.
  - 2020 Azerbaijani parliamentary election The ruling party takes about 65 of 125 seats.
  - 2020 Delhi Legislative Assembly election's results announced with Aam Aadmi Party securing 62 of 70 seats.
- February 14
  - German President Frank-Walter Steinmeier criticizes the United States for rejecting "even the idea of an international community." He also criticized Russia and China.
  - The U.S. issues a travel ban against Sri Lanka general Shavendra Silva for human rights violations.
  - Benjamin Griveaux, 42, French President Macron's preferred candidate for mayor of Paris, withdraws his candidacy after a sex video is leaked.
- February 15
  - Thousands protest in eastern Germany against the role Christian Democrats and the Free Democratic Party in supporting a far-right political party in Thuringia.
  - U.S. Defense Secretary Mark Esper says that a "reduction in violence" deal reached with the Taliban in Afghanistan "looks very promising." The agreement is expected to be formally announced on February 16 and to go into effect on February 17.
  - Venezuela carries out military exercises and drills amidst growing tensions with the United States. Opposition leader Juan Guaidó returns after a three-week tour that included a visit with the U.S. president.
  - Facebook founder and CEO Mark Zuckerberg supports increased taxes in Europe for Silicon Valley tech giants.
- February 16
  - A Saudi jet crashes in Al Jawf Region after being shot down by Houthi rebels. 31 civilians are killed and 12 injured in a retaliatory strike in Yemen.
  - 2020 Guinean legislative election.
  - Tesla is ordered to stop work on a factory in Germany due to environmental concerns.
  - North Macedonia's parliament is dissolved ahead of the April election.
  - Software problems force the suspension of the 2020 Dominican Republic municipal elections.
  - Ivanka Trump praises Saudi Arabia and other Mideast countries for the advances they have made on women's rights.
  - French Health Minister Agnès Buzyn announces her candidacy for mayor of Paris, after Benjamin Griveaux drops out.
  - Strikes among seasonal ski resort workers break out against unemployment reforms at 50 locations in France, from the Alps to the Pyrenees.
- February 17 – 3,000 interns in the public service sector of Spain protest against the lack of a permanent contract. 21.6% of Spanish government employees are considered "temporary."
- February 18 – Incumbent Ashraf Ghani is declared the winner of the 2019 Afghan presidential election with 50.64% of the votes.
- February 19 – President Trump replaces acting director of national intelligence Joseph Maguire with the inexperienced ambassador to Germany Richard Grenell after Maguire's office tells the United States House Permanent Select Committee on Intelligence that Russia intends to interfere in the 2020 United States elections.
- February 20
  - A terrorist attack by a right-wing extremist Hanau, Hesse, Germany, leaves eleven dead including the suspect.
  - Israel asks that the Carnaval parade in Aalst, Belgium be canceled because of anti-Semitism.
  - The U.S. sanctions five Iranian clerics after they blocked 7,000 candidates in the upcoming parliamentary elections.
- February 21 – 2020 Iranian legislative election.
- February 22 – 2020 Togolese presidential election. Incumbent President Faure Gnassingbe wins reelection with 72% of the vote.
- February 23 – Police in Haiti violently protest against money being spent on a carnaval celebrations instead of their salaries.
- February 24 – Seven people, including a police officer, are killed in protests against new immigration laws in New Delhi, India before a visit by U.S. President Donald Trump.
- February 29
  - Egypt says it will use "all means" to defend its interests in a dispute with Ethiopia and Sudan over a dam on the Nile River.
  - The United States and the Taliban sign an agreement that may lead to the end of the war in Afghanistan.
  - Eight members of Hezbollah are killed by Turkish troops in Syria. Last week, 33 Turkish soldiers were killed in the fighting.
  - 10,000 to 22,000 people march in Moscow in memory of slain dissident Boris Nemtsov.

== March ==
- March 1 – The prime-minister-designate of Iraq, Mohammed Allawi withdrew from his run for the post, accusing political parties of obstructing him, creating a domestic crisis and also a possible power vacuum. This decision occurred hours after the Iraqi parliament declined for the second time in a week to approve his cabinet.
- March 2
  - The U.N. envoy to Libya, Ghassan Salamé, 69, steps down because of health concerns. Peace efforts seem further off than ever.
  - 2020 Israeli legislative election.
  - Russian President Vladimir Putin submits changes to enshrine God and heterosexuality in the constitution.
- March 6 – Thousands march in Brussels for the European Climate Strike as the warmest winter on record comes to a close.
- March 7 – The Saudi government arrests three members of the royal family in a move to consolidate Crown Prince Mohammed bin Salman's power.
- March 8 – Women's marches
  - Pakistan – Aurat March ("Women's March") in Pakistan.
  - Mexico – 100,000 women march in Mexico City, Monterrey, and other cities in Mexico.
  - Chile – Between 190,000 and 300,000 people march in Santiago, Chile and 800,000 across the country.
  - Other countries – Three masked men attack demonstrators in Kyrgyzstan. Hundreds protest in the Philippines. Marches in several countries are canceled or have lower attendance than in 2019 due to COVID-19.
- March 9 – Women strike across the country, demanding an end to violence against women in Mexico. The Chamber of Deputies and banks are forced to close.
- March 11 – Lawmakers in Russia approve legal changes that will allow President Vladimir Putin to remain in office until 2036. The changes still have to be approved the Constitutional Court and in a nation-wide referendum scheduled for April.
- March 15
  - Voters in France participate in local elections despite concerns about the coronavirus pandemic. A second round will be held on March 22.
  - Blue and White Party leader Benny Gantz is asked by Israel's president to form a government.
  - Pro-government protesters march across Brazil, ignoring social distancing recommendations.
  - Saudi authorities detain 298 government employees, including members of the military, accusing them of abuse of power, bribery, money laundering, and corruption. 379 million riyals ($101 million) are involved.
  - Anti-immigrant protests turn violent in Chios and Lesbos, Greece.
  - King Felipe VI of Spain renounces the inheritance from his father, King Emerit Juan Carlos I, who is accused of receiving €88 million ($100 million) in Saudi Arabian kickbacks. King Felipe will also take away Juan Carlos's pension.
- March 16 – Governments across Latin America impose strict measures to control the coronavirus.
  - Peru puts military personnel on the streets, blocking major roads and suspending freedom of assembly.
  - Costa Rica closes its borders.
  - Colombia closes its maritime, river, and land borders but shares information with Venezuela, where there are 33 cases of coronavirus.
  - In Chile, at least six passengers from the cruise ship Silver Explorer are treated in hospitals in Patagonia after they tested positive for coronavirus.
  - Paraguay restricts crowds and enforces an 8 p.m. curfew.
  - President Lenin Moreno of Ecuador plans to begin a curfew on March 17.
  - Panama reports 69 cases of coronavirus.
- March 16
  - U.S. Secretary of State Mike Pompeo tells his Chinese counterpart Yang Jiechi in a phone call to request Chinese officials to stop using official media channels to blame the United States for the coronavirus while Yang tells Pompeo to request American officials to stop slandering China and its anti-epidemic efforts. The call comes on the day that the World Health Organization says more coronavirus cases and deaths have been reported in the rest of the world than in China.
  - French President Emmanuel Macron announces the banning of social gatherings and the postponement of the second round of the 2020 French municipal elections.
- March 17
  - Heavy fighting kills 38 in central Yemen.
  - The Niger Armed Forces say they have killed 50 members of Boko Haram in Toumour.
- March 20
  - India hangs four men convicted of a violent gang rape in 2012.
  - Luis Almagro is reelected Secretary-General of the Organization of American States (OAS).
  - The United States continues its high-pressure sanctions against Iran despite the COVID-19 pandemic in Iran; the sanctions do not prohibit humanitarian aid.
- March 21 – North Korea test-fires two ballistic missiles into the Sea of Japan.
- March 24 – A diplomatic dispute between China and Brazil ends when the former offers to help Brazil cope with the coronavirus pandemic. Brazil reports 1,891 cases and 34 deaths; São Paulo is on lockdown.
- March 25 – The Group of Seven cannot agree on a joint statement about the coronavirus pandemic because the United States Secretary of State insists on referring to it as the “Wuhan virus”. At a meeting of the United Nations Security Council, France proposes "general and immediate cessation of hostilities in all countries," including a 30-day pause in conflicts, to allow coronavirus-related supplies to flow. The United States insists that the resolution include a reference to the Wuhan, China, origin of the coronavirus. Russia insists that ambassadors vote in person.
- March 27
  - Prime Minister Boris Johnson tests positive for COVID-19, and will self-isolate in 10 Downing Street.
  - Health Secretary for the United Kingdom, Matt Hancock tests positive for COVID-19 and reports that he is remote working and self-isolating.
  - Seven ships from the Russian Navy are monitored by the British Royal Navy in the English Channel and the North Sea.
  - Saudi Arabia says it intercepted two ballistic missiles in an attack that Yemen's Houthi launched towards Riyadh and areas near the Yemeni border. The attacks came days after Yemen's warring parties welcomed a U.N. call for a truce to fight the COVID-19 outbreak.
  - Monuments across the world turn off their lights at 8:30 p.m. in honor of Earth Hour.
- March 30 – The National Liberation Army (ELN) rebels in Colombia have declared a unilateral ceasefire for a month starting April 1. There are 700 infections and 10 deaths related to the COVID-19 pandemic in Colombia.

== April ==
- April 4
  - Vietnam protests after a Chinese maritime surveillance vessel rammed a fishing boat near the Paracel Islands in the South China Sea (East Sea).
  - Sir Keir Starmer is confirmed as the new leader of the Labour Party, succeeding Jeremy Corbyn.
- April 5
  - Queen Elizabeth II makes a rare broadcast to the UK and the wider Commonwealth, something she has done on only four previous occasions. In the address she thanks people for following the government's social distancing rules and pays tribute to key workers, and says the UK "will succeed" in its fight against coronavirus but may have "more still to endure".
  - Prime Minister Boris Johnson is admitted to hospital for tests after testing positive for coronavirus ten days earlier.
- April 6 – Prime Minister Boris Johnson is taken into intensive care after being admitted to hospital for coronavirus the day before. It is announced that First Secretary of State Dominic Raab will deputise for him.
- April 9 – Prime Minister Boris Johnson is moved out of intensive care, but remains in hospital.
- April 12
  - Bangladesh executes Abdul Majed for the murder of Sheikh Mujibur Rahman, the founder of the country.
  - 2020 North Macedonian parliamentary election.
  - Three civilians are killed in India after fighting between India and Pakistan along the border of Kashmir.
  - COVID-19 pandemic – Turkish President Recep Tayyip Erdoğan turns down an offer from Interior Minister Suleyman Soylu to resign after a stay-at-home order led to panic buying.
  - Prime Minister Boris Johnson is discharged from the hospital after being treated for coronavirus and will continue his recovery at Chequers.
- April 15 – 2020 South Korean legislative election is held despite the pandemic. President Moon Jae-in's Democratic Party wins 163 of 300 seats in parliament. Its satellite party, the Platform Party, is expected to win 17 seats for a combined total of 180. The main conservative party of the United Future Party and its satellite party, the Future Korea Party, are expected to take 103 seats.
- April 18 – Denmark and Poland announce they will not give stimulus money to businesses registered in tax havens.
- April 19 – Vietnam protests China's establishment of administrative units in the South China Sea. Malaysia also contests China's more aggressive moves.
- April 20
  - Benjamin Netanyahu (Likud) and Benny Gantz (Blue and White) agree to the formation of a national emergency government in Israel.
  - For the second time in four days, a Russian Sukhoi Su-35 intercepts a U.S. Navy aircraft in the eastern Mediterranean. A similar incident happened on June 8.
- April 22
  - United Nations secretary-general António Guterres says the impact of COVID-19 is "immediate and dreadful" but there is "another, even deeper emergency: the planet's unfolding environmental crisis."
  - After U.S. President Trump threatened to shoot Iranian patrol boats that get close to U.S. ships in the Persian Gulf, Tehran says it will destroy "any American terrorist force" if its security is threatened.
  - The Islamic Revolutionary Guard Corps launches its first satellite.
- April 24
  - COVID-19 pandemic: France and Holland pledge almost $10 billion to bail out their national airlines (€7 billion for Air France between €2 and €4 billion for KLM).
  - China closes its border with Myanmar after fighting in Jiegao, Yunnan. Artillery fire and bullets destroy a gas station in China, but there are no reports of injuries in either country.
- April 26
  - The Southern Transitional Council (SCT) in Yemen declares self-governance. The government said local and security authorities in the provinces of Hadramawt, Abyan, Shabwa, al-Mahra, and the island of Socotra dismissed the move as a “clear and definite coup."
  - Saudi Arabia abolishes capital punishment for minors, except for terrorism cases. Floggings are also banned.
  - Referendum on new constitution in Chile.
- April 27 – Boris Johnson returns to work after three weeks of illness. In his first speech outside 10 Downing Street since recovering from coronavirus, he urges the public not to lose patience with the lockdown, warning that the UK is at the moment of "maximum risk".
- April 28
  - A bombing believed to have been carried out by Kurdish fighters in Turkish-controlled Afrin, Syria kills at least 20 civilians.
  - Libyan General Khalifa Haftar is accused of carrying out a coup d'état as he puts the eastern part of the country under direct military rule.
  - Brazil President Jair Bolsonaro appoints key allies to head the Justice Ministry and Federal Police after the Supreme Federal Court authorized an investigation into allegations that Bolsonaro had tried to interfere illegally with the police agency.

== May ==
- May 1
  - North Korean Supreme Leader Kim Jong-un inaugurates a fertilizer factory, dispelling rumors of his death after twenty days when he was not seen in public.
  - Fifty-seven people are arrested in a May Day demonstration in Santiago de Chile. Due to the COVID-19 pandemic, gatherings of more than fifty people are prohibited. Police say one arrested man was supposed to be in quarantine until May 9.
  - Canada bans 1,500 kinds of assault weapons.
- May 6 – Congressman Ken Buck (R-CO) is caught on tape allegedly pressuring a district GOP party chair to sign a false affidavit certifying the results of that district assembly's vote on the nomination of candidates for a Republican primary to replace its term-limited state senator.
- May 10 – 2020 Polish presidential election. The president is expected to win in a landslide as the opposition calls for postponement. It was announced on May 6 that the election will be postponed indefinitely.
- May 12 – A bomb explosion attributed to the Islamic State of Afghanistan kills 24 at a funeral in Nangarhar Province, eastern Afghanistan. Unknown attackers killed 24 and injured 16 others, including new-born babies, mothers, and nurses at a maternity hospital in Kabul.
- May 16
  - Thousands in Sarajevo, Bosnia-Herzegovina, many wearing masks, demonstrate against a Roam Catholic Mass for Croatia's Nazi-allied soldiers and civilians killed by partisan forces at the end of World War II.
  - Protests against Stay-at-home orders result in arrests in Warsaw and London.
  - Satellite pictures show 200 buildings burning in a village in Let Kar, Myanmar. Villagers say the fires were set by government soldiers, but the government says guerrillas from the Arakan Army are responsible.
- May 17 – Dominican Republic presidential election
- May 20 – 2020 Burundian presidential election Evariste Ndayishimiye, 52, wins with 69% of the vote and will not face a second-round of voting. President Pierre Nkurunziza will step down and be granted the title ″Supreme Guide.″
- May 22 – May 2020 New Zealand National Party leadership election. Todd Muller and Nikki Kaye won.
- May 24 – China clamps down on dissidents in Hong Kong; authorities warn that U.S. backing of dissidents could set off a new Cold War.
- May 26 – The U.S. (AFRICOM) says Russia has sent fighter jets to Tripoli to support the mercenaries trying to topple the government of Libya. Russia says this is ″disinformation.″
- May 31
  - Opposition leader Mikola Statkevich is arrested in a protest in Minsk, Belarus. 50 opposition activists have been arrested in the last few days, including blogger Sergei Tikhanovsky, who was arrested in Grodno.
  - People in cities around the world including London, Berlin, and Rio march against police brutality and the murder of George Floyd.
- May – COVID-19 pandemic: Online criticism of Italy's handling of the pandemic is censored by World Health Organization (WHO) officials. Similar criticism of other large donars, including China and the United Kingdom, is similarly muted.

== June ==
- June 1
  - Mexican President Andrés Manuel López Obrador announces a "new normal" of partial reopening with a road trip to Cancun and the inauguration of the Mayan Train. Mexico has nearly 100,000 confirmed cases of COVID-19 and nearly 10,000 deaths.
  - Nationwide protests continue in the United States a week after the murder of George Floyd at the hands of four police officers.
- June 1 to 5 – Protests against the murder of George Floyd and other instances of police brutality extend to hundreds of cities across at least 40 countries.
- June 6 – Han Kuo-yu, mayor of Kaohsiung, Taiwan, is recalled in a special election.
- June 11 – President Donald Trump authorizes economic and travel restrictions on International Criminal Court (ICCt) employees who investigate war crimes committed by Americans in the War in Afghanistan. Prime Minister Imad Khamis was dismissed by President Bashar al-Assad, amid anti-government protests over deteriorating economic conditions.
- June 15
  - Twenty-two Indian soldiers die in a border clash with Chinese troops in the Ladakh region.
  - Kyrgyzstan Prime Minister Mukhammedkalyi Abylgaziev resigns amidst scandal and is replaced with Kubatbek Boronov.
- June 23 – 2020 Malawian presidential election: Opposition alliance leader Lazarus Chakwera, 65, wins with 58.57% of the vote.
- June 28 – 2020 Polish presidential election: Populist conservative incumbent, Andrzej Duda will face off against the liberal mayor of Warsaw, Rafał Trzaskowski in a second round.

== July ==
- July 1 – 2020 Russian constitutional referendum: President Vladimir Putin is allowed to extend his presidency to 2036.
- July 5 – 2020 Croatian parliamentary election The conservative Croatian Democratic Union (HDZ) wins 66 of 151 seats in parliament.
- July 9
  - Agnès Callamard, an independent U.N. human rights expert, issues a report insisting an American drone strike that killed Iranian Gen. Qasem Soleimani in January was a “watershed” event in the use of drones and amounted to a violation of international law.
  - Turkish President Recep Tayyip Erdogan signs a decree handing over Hagia Sophia to Turkey's Religious Affairs Presidency, changing its status from a museum to a mosque.
- July 10
  - 2020 Singaporean general election: The ruling People's Action Party (PAP) maintained its power, winning 83 of 93 seats in parliament.
  - The body of Seoul mayor Park Won-soon is found on a mountainside. Park was seen as a reformer but had recently been accused of sexual assault.
- July 11
  - Thousands protest the arrest of Khabarovsk Governor Sergei Furgal on murder charges in eastern Russia.
  - Thousands protest against corruption by the Bulgarian Prime Minister Boyko Borisov.
  - COVID-19 pandemic
    - Thousands protest Israel's economic response to the pandemic.
    - Thousands of protesters, many masked, march for the fifth night in a row to demand the resignation of Serbian President Aleksandar Vučić. The protests are mostly against the president's handling of the national response to the COVID-19 pandemic in Serbia, where 18,073 cases and 382 deaths have been confirmed.
- July 12
  - 500,000 voters participate in primary elections for pro-democracy candidates in Hong Kong, in what organizers say is a vote against the national security law.
  - Second round of Polish presidential election.
  - Thousands of protesters march in Kinshasa, Bukavu, and Kananga; Democratic Republic of the Congo, against the selection of a new election chief aligned with former president Joseph Kabila. Five people were killed in similar protests on July 8.

== August ==
- August 5 - The Lebanese government declares a two-week State of Emergency, following the Beirut explosion.
- August 6
  - Canadian military magazine Kanwa Asian Defence publishes photos that show China sending hundreds of Type 05 amphibious fighting vehicles to Taiwan Strait as tensions rise.
  - Egyptian Foreign Minister Sameh Shoukry says that his country and Greece have signed an agreement designating an exclusive economic zone in the eastern Mediterranean between the two countries, effectively nullifying an accord between Turkey and the internationally recognized government of Libya.
  - The Indian Defence Ministry warns that its conflict with China is bound to be long.
  - Protesters in Beirut, Lebanon, ask visiting French President Emmanuel Macron to intervene to help eradicate the corruption that led to the August 4 explosion that killed 157 and injured at least 5,000.
- August 7
  - Russia warns that any incoming ballistic missile will be treated as if it were nuclear and would spark a nuclear response.
  - The United States Department of the Treasury sanctions eleven top officials in Hong Kong and China, including chief executive Carrie Lam. The move comes only hours after Donald Trump banned social media platforms TikTok and WeChat.
- August 8
  - Police in Beirut, Lebanon, reportedly react to protesters with tear gas and live ammunition after the August 4 explosion, sending 55 people to local hospitals as 117 others are treated at the scene.
  - 15,000 protesters march against corruption in downtown Jerusalem, demanding the resignation of Prime Minister Benjamin Netanyahu.
- August 9 – 2020 Belarusian presidential election. Violent protests and allegations of electoral fraud break out after incumbent President Alexander Lukashenko claims a landslide victory over former teacher Sviatlana Tsikhanouskaya.
- August 10
  - 2020 Trinidad and Tobago general election: Preliminary results give 22 seats to Prime Minister Keith Rowley's People's National Movement (PNM) and 19 seats to the opposition United National Congress (UNC).
  - Hong Kong billionaire activist and newspaper publisher Jimmy Lai is arrested under security law.
  - Lebanese Prime Minister Hassan Diab and his cabinet resign.
- August 12 – Mexico arrests Jesús Orta and eighteen other former top police officials in a crackdown on corruption.
- August 13 – Donald Trump says the United Arab Emirates and Israel have agreed to reestablish diplomatic relations.
- August 16
  - 2020 Belarusian protests: Despite week-long protests against vote fraud in Belarus, President Alexander Lukashenko rejects calls for new elections.
  - Lebanese President Michel Aoun says it would be "Impossible" for him to resign following the explosion that killed 170 and left hundreds of thousands homeless.
- August 18 – Russian media report that Belarus President Alexander Lukashenko says he will allow new elections after the country adopts a new constitution. He had previously said that he would have to be killed before there could be new elections.
- August 20 – Polish Foreign Minister Jacek Czaputowicz resigns in the midst of the crisis in Belarus. This is the second cabinet resignation in a week, as Health Minister Lukasz Szumowski left amid increased COVID-19 infection rates.
- August 21
  - 2020 Khabarovsk Krai protests: 1,500 people in Khabarovsk, Khabarovsk Krai, Russia conduct their seventh march against the Moscow government. They are protesting against the arrest of Governor Sergei Furgal and in support of Alexei Navalny and dissidents in Belarus. Navalny, a critic of the Kremlin, was taken to a German hospital after a suspected poisoning on August 19.
  - Iran agrees to inspections by the International Atomic Energy Agency (IAEA) at nuclear sites in Marivan and Amand, Qazvin after the United States calls for reimposition of sanctions.
- August 25 – The United Nations Security Council rejects an effort by the United States to “snap back” sanctions on Iran.
- August 30 – 2020 Montenegrin parliamentary election and local elections.

== September ==
- September 4 – Serbia and Kosovo normalize economic relations. Kosovo also establishes diplomatic relations with Israel, and both countries open embassies in Jerusalem.
- September 6
  - Hong Kong protests: Police arrest 290 people in protests.
  - Belarusian protests: A record 100,000 march on the Palace of Independence; 72 are arrested and students strike.
- September 7 – Two deserters from the Myanmar Army testify on video that they were ordered to commit rape, murder, and other atrocities against Rohingya people, mostly Muslims.
- September 9
  - Several thousand protest against proposed electrical power price increases in North Macedonia.
  - A fire at a refugee camp in Greece leaves 13,000 homeless.
  - Iraq War: The United States Army announces a reduction of 5,200 troops in Iraq.
- September 11
  - The DoD cancels a Navy low-level flyover of New York City deemed "inappropriate."
  - Israel and Bahrain agree to establish diplomatic relations.
- September 12
  - The Association of Southeast Asian Nations (ASEAN) calls for dialogue to prevent a conflict in the East China Sea.
  - Representatives of the Afghan government and the Taliban meet in Qatar to begin peace talks.
  - MV Wakashio oil spill: Thousands march in Port Louis to protest the government's handling of the July oil spill in Mauritius.
  - Mauricio Claver-Carone becomes the first citizen of the U.S. to lead the Inter-American Development Bank.
- September 13 – Saudi Arabian-led intervention in Yemen: Fighting intensifies in Yemen after the COVID-19 truce.
- September 21 – More than 160 world leaders ask the UK to release Julian Assange and not extradite him to the United States.
- September 27 – Ethnic fighting breaks out into the 2020 Nagorno-Karabakh war between Azerbaijan and Armemia.

== October ==
- October 1 – The 2020 World Expo will open in Dubai.
- October 3 – The government of Sudan and ten rebel groups sign a peace agreement, ending 17 years of war.
- October 11
  - 2020 Tajik presidential election: Incumbent Emomali Rahmon of the People's Democratic Party reelected.
  - 2020 Lithuanian parliamentary election. Independent Ingrida Šimonytė is the Prime-Minister designate.
- October 18
  - 2020 Bolivian general election: Luis Arce of the Movement for Socialism is elected.
  - 2020 Guinean presidential election
  - 2020 Northern Cypriot presidential election (second round): Ersin Tatar of the National Unity Party (UBP) is elected.
- October 22—24 – 2020 Seychellois presidential election: Won by Wavel Ramkalawan.
- October 28 – 2020 Tanzanian general election: Incumbent John Magufuli is reelected.
- October 25 – 2020 Chilean national plebiscite: The "Approve" side won with 78% agreeing to draft a new constitution. 79% opted for a "Constitutional Convention" as the best way to rewrite the text.
- October 31
  - 2020 Ivorian general election.
  - 2020 Georgian parliamentary election: Georgian Dream leads at the end of the first round with a second round scheduled for November 21.

== November ==
- November 3 – 2020 United States elections
  - 2020 United States presidential election: Joe Biden and Kamala Harris win the presidency and vice-presidency respectively.
  - 2020 United States Senate elections: Democrats pick up two seats but Republicans hold 50–48 advantage as two seats go to runoffs.
  - 2020 United States House of Representatives elections
  - 2020 United States gubernatorial elections: Republicans increase their control to 27 seats by flipping Montana.
- November 4 – "Scores, probably hundreds" of civilians are killed in the conflict in Tigray Region, northern Ethiopia.
- November 5 – 2020 Vincentian general election: Unity Labour Party wins nine of 15 seats.
- November 8
  - 2020 Myanmar general election
  - 2020 Egyptian parliamentary election
- November 9
  - 2020 Nagorno-Karabakh ceasefire agreement signed, ending the war between Azerbaijan and Armenia.
  - President Martín Vizcarra of Peru resigns after being impeached on corruption charges.
- November 11
  - 2020 Belizean general election: Johnny Briceño of the People's United Party (PUP) leads 19 seats to five.
  - Sheikh Salman bin Hamad bin Isa Al Khalifa is appointed Prime Minister after the death of his great uncle, Prime Minister Prince Khalifa bin Salman, who had held the position for nearly fifty years.
- November 12 – Thousands protest the ouster of Peruvian President Martin Vizcarra.
- November 13 – Fighting between India and Pakistan along the Line of Control in Kashmir leaves 15 dead, including ten civilians.
- November 14
  - Thousands rally in Tbilisi, Georgia, to protest the October election, which they say was rigged.
  - Twenty diverse groups protest against the Monarchy of Thailand.
  - A report in The New York Times says that Abu Mohammed al-Masri, the alleged mastermind behind the 1998 United States embassy bombings was killed by Israeli intelligence in Tehran, Iran, on August 7, 2020.
- November 15
  - The Regional Comprehensive Economic Partnership (RCEP) consisting of fifteen countries including China and Japan, is signed during a virtual summit at the Association of Southeast Asian Nations (ASEAN). It is the largest free-trade association in the world.
  - Manuel Merino resigns the presidency of Peru after only four days in office.
  - 900 are arrested in protests against the reelection of Belarus President Alexander Lukashenko.
  - Armenians burn their own homes as they leave Kalbajar, Azerbaijan.
  - Ethiopia's Tigray conflict takes on an international character as rockets are fired at the Asmara, Eritrea, airport, and 25,000 refugees flee from Tigray, to Sudan.
  - 2020 Moldovan presidential election (Round 2): Won by Maia Sandu with 57% of the vote.
  - 2020 Brazilian municipal elections (Round 1): Of the nearly 60 candidates whom President Bolsonaro backed, only nine advanced. Transgender candidates make two historic wins.
- November 16
  - Hungary and Poland threaten to veto the 2021 EU budget and recovery plan.
  - 2020 Bosnian municipal elections
  - UN-sponsored peace talks in Libya fail to establish an interim government.
  - Peru chooses Francisco Sagasti as interim president.
- November 17 – Acting Secretary of Defense Christopher C. Miller announces that the United States will withdraw 2,500 troops from Afghanistan and Iraq by January 15, 2021.
- November 17
  - Yemeni Civil War: Fifty fighters from both sides are killed in fighting centered in Zinjibar District.
  - Greek police use tear gas, stun grenades, and water cannon to break up a demonstration held to commemorate the 1973 Athens Polytechnic uprising.
- November 21
  - The 2020 G20 Riyadh summit opens as a virtual summit.
  - Thousands march in Paris, France, to protest restrictions on freedom of information and media rights.
- November 22 – 2020 Burkinabé general election
- November 26 – 2000 Romanian general election (Round 1). Prime Minister Ludovic Orban declares victory.
- November 29 – 2020 Brazilian municipal elections (Round 2)
- November - Thousands of farmers from various parts of India move to the capital city amidst blockades protesting against the new farm reforms.

== December ==
- December 2
  - The United Nations Commission on Narcotic Drugs votes to remove cannabis from a list of dangerous drugs in recognition of its medical value, although some controls will remain.
- December 5
  - Russia begins vaccination against COVID-19 in Moscow.
  - 2020 Kuwaiti general election: Two-thirds of the legislature lose their seats in an election that sees 60% turnout among eligible voters.
  - Thousands march in Yerevan, Armenia in protest of Prime Minister Nikol Pashinyan's handling of the Nagorno-Karabakh conflict.
  - The United States announces it will withdraw almost all its troops from Somalia by January 15.
- December 6
  - Violence breaks out in Paris as thousands protest against security laws. Peaceful rallies are held in Marseille, Lyon, Lille and other French cities.
  - Three hundred protesters are arrested in the 18th week of protests in Minsk, Belarus.
  - 2020 Romanian legislative election
  - 2020 Venezuelan parliamentary election: Turnout is 31% as Maduro's government is reelected with 67.6%, the traditional opposition won 17.95%, and dissidents on the left won 3% of the vote. Eighteen countries in America (including the United States and Canada but excluding Argentina, Bolivia, and Mexico) call the election fraudulent and illegal.
- December 7
  - 2020 Ghanaian general election: President Nana Akufo-Addo wins reelection with 51.59% of the vote. Five people are killed in election-related violence.
  - Six supporters of Indonesian hard-line cleric Muhammad Rizieq Shihab are killed in a shootout in Jakarta.
  - Abdolnaser Hemmati, Governor of the Central Bank of Iran, says that United States economic sanctions are blocking Iran from the Access to COVID-19 Tools Accelerator (COVAX) program of the World Health Organization (WHO).
  - Romanian prime minister Ludovic Orban resigns, but the National Liberal Party hopes to stay in power.
  - Indian farm reforms 2020: Tens of thousands of Indian farmers protest for the 12th day.
- December 9
  - 2020 Indonesian local elections
  - Hanan Ashrawi resigns from the Executive Committee of the Palestine Liberation Organization (PLO).
  - Lebanon's Prime Minister designate Saad al-Hariri presents a proposed cabinet to President Michel Aoun. A viable government is key to receiving French aid.
- December 11 – European Union leaders agree to cut greenhouse gas emissions by at least 55% by 2030.
- December 13
  - A roadside bomb in Rawalpindi, Punjab, Pakistan, wounds 23. Similar bombs earlier this year killed nine and wounded 151.
  - The UK and the EU agree to extend Brexit trade negotiations.
  - Fifty-one Taliban fighters and seven civilians are killed in fighting in Kandahar, Afghanistan.
- December 14
  - Somalia cuts diplomatic ties with Kenya after Muse Bihi Abdi from Somaliland visits Kenya.
  - By a 306–232 vote, the United States Electoral College votes to elect Joe Biden and Kamala Harris president and vice president of the U.S. Presidents López Obrador of Mexico and Putin of Russia congratulate him.
  - Saudi Arabia says an explosion on the Singapore-flagged BW Rhine was a terrorist attack from an undisclosed source.
- December 15 – Retailers face pressure to boycott Chinese cotton as stories emerge about forced labor among Uyghurs in China.
- December 18
  - 2020–2021 Indian farmers' protest: At least 25 people have died during the protests since November 26, including 14 due to natural causes.
  - At least 15 civilians are killed and 20 are wounded, including children, in an explosion in Ghazni province, Afghanistan.
- December 20
  - COVID-19 pandemic: Several European Union countries and Canada temporarily stop flights from the UK in response to a new, fast-spreading strain of the virus. Other countries follow suit, with Saudi Arabia, Kuwait, and Oman closing their borders completely.
  - Taiwan deploys ships and planes as a Chinese carrier group sails through the Taiwan Strait. The United States sent a warship through the strait on December 19.
  - President Bidya Devi Bhandari of Nepal dissolves parliament and calls for spring elections.
- December 22 –
  - Belarusian leader Alexander Lukashenko allows Tadevuš Kandrusievič, archbishop of the Roman Catholic Archdiocese of Minsk–Mohilev and a Lukashenko critic, to return from exile in Poland.
  - Donald Trump presents Indian Prime Minister Narendra Modi with Legion of Merit.
- December 23 – Outgoing U.S. President Trump's pardon of four Blackwater mercenaries convicted of murdering 17 civilians in Baghdad in 2007 is widely criticized.
- December 24 – The EU and UK reach a Brexit deal.
- December 26 – Yemeni Civil War: A new Yemeni government is sworn in as per the Saudi-backed Riyadh Agreement of 2019.
- December 27
  - 2020 Central African general election
  - 2020 Nigerien general election
  - Donald Trump reluctantly signs a $2 trillion bill that averts a U.S. government shutdown and provides $900 billion in COVID-19 relief.
- December 28
  - Thousands in Montenegro protest against the government's pro-Serbia stance in approving a new property law that favors the Serbian Orthodox Church.
  - Women's rights activist Loujain al-Hathloul, 31, is sentenced to almost six years of prison in Saudi Arabia.
- December 29
  - Tens of thousands protest against the dissolution of the Federal Parliament of Nepal.
  - Argentina legalizes abortion up to the 14th week of pregnancy, becoming the fourth Latin American country to do so.
- December 30
  - Twenty-two are killed and 50 wounded when a bomb explodes at the Aden International Airport in Yemen. Information Minister Moammar Al-Eryani blamed the attack on Houthi rebels, who denied responsibility.

== Scheduled events ==
- December 31 – If implemented, the Brexit transition period will expire.

== History by world issue ==
Note: This section is provided for issue-based overviews in narrative format, if desired.

=== Climate change ===
In December 2019, the World Meteorological Organization released its annual climate report revealing that climate impacts are worsening. They found the global sea temperatures are rising as well as land temperatures worldwide. 2019 is the last year in a decade that is the warmest on record.

Global carbon emissions hit a record high in 2019, even though the rate of increase slowed somewhat, according to a report from Global Carbon Project. The economic slowdown and the closure of factories related to the coronavirus pandemic brought a 6% decrease in emissions in February and March 2020.

BlackRock global money management firm Chief Executive Larry Fink said in January 2020 that climate change "has become a defining factor in companies' long-term prospects... and I believe we are on the edge of a fundamental reshaping of finance."

=== Coronavirus pandemic ===
Legislatures close, cities, regions, and entire countries are locked down, and borders close across the world in response to the pandemic. Elections are postponed. Governments rush to find funding to combat the virus, provide medical supplies and services, and to mitigate the economic slowdown. The virus, which began in Wuhan, China, in December 2019 was declared a pandemic by the World Health Organization (WHO) on March 11. The epicenter of the pandemic shifted from East Asia at the beginning of the year to Europe in March and April, then to the United States and Latin America in May and June. As of June 7, there have been over 7,000,000 confirmed cases and 400,000 deaths worldwide, with about 30% of the cases in the United States.

After accusing the WHO of bias towards China, U.S. President Donald Trump threatened to permanently cut off funding for the organization. Many blame Trump himself for the high number of cases in the United States.

=== Police brutality and racism ===
Hundreds of thousands of people protest in the United States and around the world against the May 26 murder of George Floyd in Minneapolis, Minnesota. Many of the protests emphasize local cases of police brutality and racism.

== See also ==
- Timeline articles for 2020
  - 2020
  - List of elections in 2020
  - 2020 national electoral calendar
- Decade articles
  - 2010s in political history
  - 2020s in political history

=== Specific situations ===
- Timeline of the Israeli–Palestinian conflict, 2020
- Timeline of the Syrian Civil War (January–April 2020)

=== Countries and regions ===
- 2020 in United States politics and government
- 2020 in United Kingdom politics and government
- 2020 United States elections

=== Categories ===
WikiProject—Wikiproject Politics
