= Sangan, Qazvin =

Sangan (Persian: سنگان) in Qazvin Province may refer to:

- Sangan-e Olya
- Sangan-e Sofla, Qazvin
