= Tarazan =

Tarazan (Persian: طرازان) may refer to these places in Iran:

- Tarazan-e Olya
- Tarazan-e Sofla

== See also ==
- Tarzan (disambiguation)
