= Mir Khavand =

Mir Khavand (Persian: ميرخواند) may refer to:

- Mir Khavand-e Olya
- Mir Khavand-e Sofla

== See also ==
- Mir Khvand the historian
