= Khakineh =

Khakineh or Khaginah or Khaginakh or Khagineh (Persian: خاكينه) may refer to:

- Khakineh-ye Bala
- Khakineh-ye Pain
