= Amand, Qazvin =

Amand عمند
- Village
- Location within Iran
- Coordinates: 36°37′51″N 49°14′10″E
- Country: Iran
- Province: Qazvin
- County: Qazvin
- Bakhsh: Tarom Sofla
- Rural District: Khandan

Population (2006)
  - Total: 19
- Time zone: UTC+3:30 (IRST)
  - Summer (DST): UTC+4:30 (IRDT)

Amand (Persian: عمند, also Romanized as ‘Amand; also known as Āmad) is a village in Khandan Rural District, Tarom Sofla District, Qazvin County, Qazvin Province, Iran. At the 2006 census, its population was 19, in 10 families.

Western analysts believe Amand has been a manufacturing site for nuclear weapons; the government agreed to allow inspectors from the International Atomic Energy Agency in August 2020.
