= Zarand =

Zarand may refer to:

- Zarand, Iran, a city in Kerman Province, Iran
- Zarand, Qazvin, a village in Qazvin Province, Iran
- Zarand, Zanjan, a village in Zanjan Province, Iran
- Zarand County, an administrative subdivision of Kerman Province, Iran
- Zărand (Hungarian: Zaránd), Arad County, Romania
