= Kallaj =

Village in Qazvin province, Iran

Kallaj Persian: كلج
- Village
- Location within Iran
- Coordinates: 36°42′16″N 49°15′44″E
- Country: Iran
- Province: Qazvin
- County: Qazvin
- District: Tarom-e Sofla
- Rural District: Khandan

Population (2016)
  - Total: 1,624
- Time zone: UTC+3:30 (IRST)

Kallaj (Persian: كلج) (Note: Also romanized as Kaladzh and Kalaj) is a village in Khandan Rural District of Tarom-e Sofla District in Qazvin County, Qazvin province, Iran.

== Demographics ==
=== Population ===
At the time of the 2006 National Census, the village's population was 1,517 in 425 households. The following census in 2011 counted 1,376 people in 448 households. The 2016 census measured the population of the village as 1,624 people in 572 households.
