= Orkan-e Tork =

Orkan-e Tork اوركن ترك
- Village
- Location within Iran
- Coordinates: 36°37′00″N 49°23′00″E
- Country: Iran
- Province: Qazvin
- County: Qazvin
- Bakhsh: Tarom Sofla
- Rural District: Khandan

Population (2006)
  - Total: 131
- Time zone: UTC+3:30 (IRST)
  - Summer (DST): UTC+4:30 (IRDT)

Orkan-e Tork (Persian: اوركن ترك; also known as Organ-e Tork) is a village in Khandan Rural District, Tarom Sofla District, Qazvin County, Qazvin Province, Iran. At the 2006 census, its population was 131, in 35 families.
