= Zabad =

Zabad may refer to:

- Zabad (Bible), several figures in the Bible
- Zabad, Iran, a village in Qazvin Province, Iran
- Zabad, Syria, a village
