= Duljak Khan-e Mohammadabad =

Village in Qazvin province, Iran

Duljak Khan-e Mohammadabad Persian: دولجك خان محمداباد
- Village
- Location within Iran
- Coordinates: 36°37′50″N 49°19′50″E
- Country: Iran
- Province: Qazvin
- County: Qazvin
- District: Tarom-e Sofla
- Rural District: Khandan

Population (2016)
  - Total: 366
- Time zone: UTC+3:30 (IRST)

Duljak Khan-e Mohammadabad (Persian: دولجك خان محمداباد) (Note: Also romanized as Dūljak Khān-e Moḩammadābād; also known as Moḩammadābād) is a village in Khandan Rural District of Tarom-e Sofla District in Qazvin County, Qazvin province, Iran.

== Demographics ==
=== Population ===
At the time of the 2006 National Census, the village's population was 116 in 40 households. The following census in 2011 counted 131 people in 57 households. The 2016 census measured the population of the village as 366 people in 117 households.
