= Anbaqin =

Village in Qazvin province, Iran

Anbaqin Persian: عنبقين
- Village
- Location within Iran
- Coordinates: 36°37′32″N 49°10′06″E
- Country: Iran
- Province: Qazvin
- County: Qazvin
- District: Tarom-e Sofla
- Rural District: Khandan

Population (2016)
  - Total: 300
- Time zone: UTC+3:30 (IRST)

Anbaqin (Persian: عنبقين) (Note: Also romanized as Anbaqīn; also known as ‘Amaqīn, Ambakin, and Ammehghin) is a village in Khandan Rural District of Tarom-e Sofla District in Qazvin County, Qazvin province, Iran.

== Demographics ==
=== Population ===
At the time of the 2006 National Census, the village's population was 177 in 65 households. The following census in 2011 counted 124 people in 52 households. The 2016 census measured the population of the village as 300 people in 117 households.
