= Abbasabad, Qazvin =

Village in Qazvin province, Iran

Abbasabad Persian: عباس آباد
- Village
- Location within Iran
- Coordinates: 36°28′18″N 49°09′25″E
- Country: Iran
- Province: Qazvin
- County: Qazvin
- District: Tarom-e Sofla
- Rural District: Chuqur

Population (2016)
  - Total: 355
- Time zone: UTC+3:30 (IRST)

Abbasabad (Persian: عباس آباد) (Note: Also romanized as ‘Abbāsābād) is a village in Chuqur Rural District of Tarom-e Sofla District in Qazvin County, Qazvin province, Iran.

== Demographics ==
=== Population ===
At the time of the 2006 National Census, the village's population was 305 in 57 households. The following census in 2011 counted 324 people in 91 households. The 2016 census measured the population of the village as 355 people in 108 households.
