= Somaq, Qazvin =

Village in Qazvin province, Iran

Somaq Persian: سماق
- Village
- Location within Iran
- Coordinates: 36°23′39″N 49°22′07″E
- Country: Iran
- Province: Qazvin
- County: Qazvin
- District: Tarom-e Sofla
- Rural District: Kuhgir

Population (2016)
  - Total: 251
- Time zone: UTC+3:30 (IRST)

Somaq (Persian: سماق) (Note: Also romanized as Somāq; also known as Emamzadeh Kazem (امامزاده کاظِم) and Somak) is a village in Kuhgir Rural District of Tarom-e Sofla District in Qazvin County, Qazvin province, Iran.

== Demographics ==
=== Population ===
At the time of the 2006 National Census, the village's population was 156 in 32 households. The following census in 2011 counted 42 people in 13 households. The 2016 census measured the population of the village as 251 people in 67 households.
