= Hoseynabad, Tarom-e Sofla =

Village in Qazvin province, Iran

Hoseynabad Persian: حسين آباد
- Village
- Location within Iran
- Coordinates: 36°33′07″N 49°13′41″E
- Country: Iran
- Province: Qazvin
- County: Qazvin
- District: Tarom-e Sofla
- Rural District: Chuqur

Population (2016)
  - Total: 222
- Time zone: UTC+3:30 (IRST)

Hoseynabad (Persian: حسين آباد) (Note: Also romanized as Ḩoseynābād; also known as Husainābād and Khusaynabad) is a village in Chuqur Rural District of Tarom-e Sofla District in Qazvin County, Qazvin province, Iran.

== Demographics ==
=== Population ===
At the time of the 2006 National Census, the village's population was 151 in 36 households. The following census in 2011 counted 19 people in 10 households. The 2016 census measured the population of the village as 222 people in 72 households.
