= Khakineh-ye Pain =

Khakineh-ye Pain خاكينه پائين
- Village
- Location within Iran
- Coordinates: 36°38′00″N 49°26′00″E
- Country: Iran
- Province: Qazvin
- County: Qazvin
- Bakhsh: Tarom Sofla
- Rural District: Niyarak

Population (2006)
  - Total: 100
- Time zone: UTC+3:30 (IRST)
  - Summer (DST): UTC+4:30 (IRDT)

Khakineh-ye Pain (Persian: خاكينه پائين, also Romanized as Khākīneh-ye Pā’īn; also known as Khākīneh-ye Soflá) is a village in Niyarak Rural District, Tarom Sofla District, Qazvin County, Qazvin Province, Iran. At the 2006 census, its population was 80, in 18 families.
