= Saznaq =

Village in Qazvin province, Iran

Saznaq Persian: سزنق
- Village
- Location within Iran
- Coordinates: 36°32′46″N 49°03′02″E
- Country: Iran
- Province: Qazvin
- County: Qazvin
- District: Tarom-e Sofla
- Rural District: Chuqur

Population (2016)
  - Total: 216
- Time zone: UTC+3:30 (IRST)

Saznaq (Persian: سزنق) (Note: Also romanized as Sazanaq and Sezneq; also known as Sāzen, Saznagh, and Saznak) is a village in Chuqur Rural District of Tarom-e Sofla District in Qazvin County, Qazvin province, Iran.

== Demographics ==
=== Population ===
At the time of the 2006 National Census, the village's population was 123 in 27 households. The following census in 2011 counted 68 people in 19 households. The 2016 census measured the population of the village as 216 people in 72 households.
