= Barvaj =

Barvaj بروج
- Village
- Location within Iran
- Coordinates: 36°35′32″N 49°02′05″E
- Country: Iran
- Province: Qazvin
- County: Qazvin
- Bakhsh: Tarom Sofla
- Rural District: Chuqur

Population (2006)
  - Total: 53
- Time zone: UTC+3:30 (IRST)
  - Summer (DST): UTC+4:30 (IRDT)

Barvaj (Persian: بروج, also Romanized as Barooj, Barvach, Barvadzh, and Barwaj; also known as Darvaj) is a village in Chuqur Rural District, Tarom Sofla District, Qazvin County, Qazvin Province, Iran. At the 2006 census, its population was 53, in 12 families.
