= Shizar =

Shizar (Persian: شيزر) may refer to:

- Shizar, Qazvin
- Shizar, Takestan
- Shizar Rural District, in Kermanshah Province
