= Mahin, Tarom-e Sofla =

Village in Qazvin province, Iran

Mahin Persian: ماهين
- Village
- Location within Iran
- Coordinates: 36°34′23″N 49°03′03″E
- Country: Iran
- Province: Qazvin
- County: Qazvin
- District: Tarom-e Sofla
- Rural District: Chuqur

Population (2016)
  - Total: 340
- Time zone: UTC+3:30 (IRST)

Mahin (Persian: ماهين) (Note: Also romanized as Māhīn; also known as Magan) is a village in Chuqur Rural District of Tarom-e Sofla District in Qazvin County, Qazvin province, Iran.

== Demographics ==
=== Population ===
At the time of the 2006 National Census, the village's population was 233 in 77 households. The following census in 2011 counted 229 people in 89 households. The 2016 census measured the population of the village as 340 people in 124 households.
