= Siah Push, Qazvin =

Village in Qazvin province, Iran

Siah Push Persian: سياه پوش
- Village
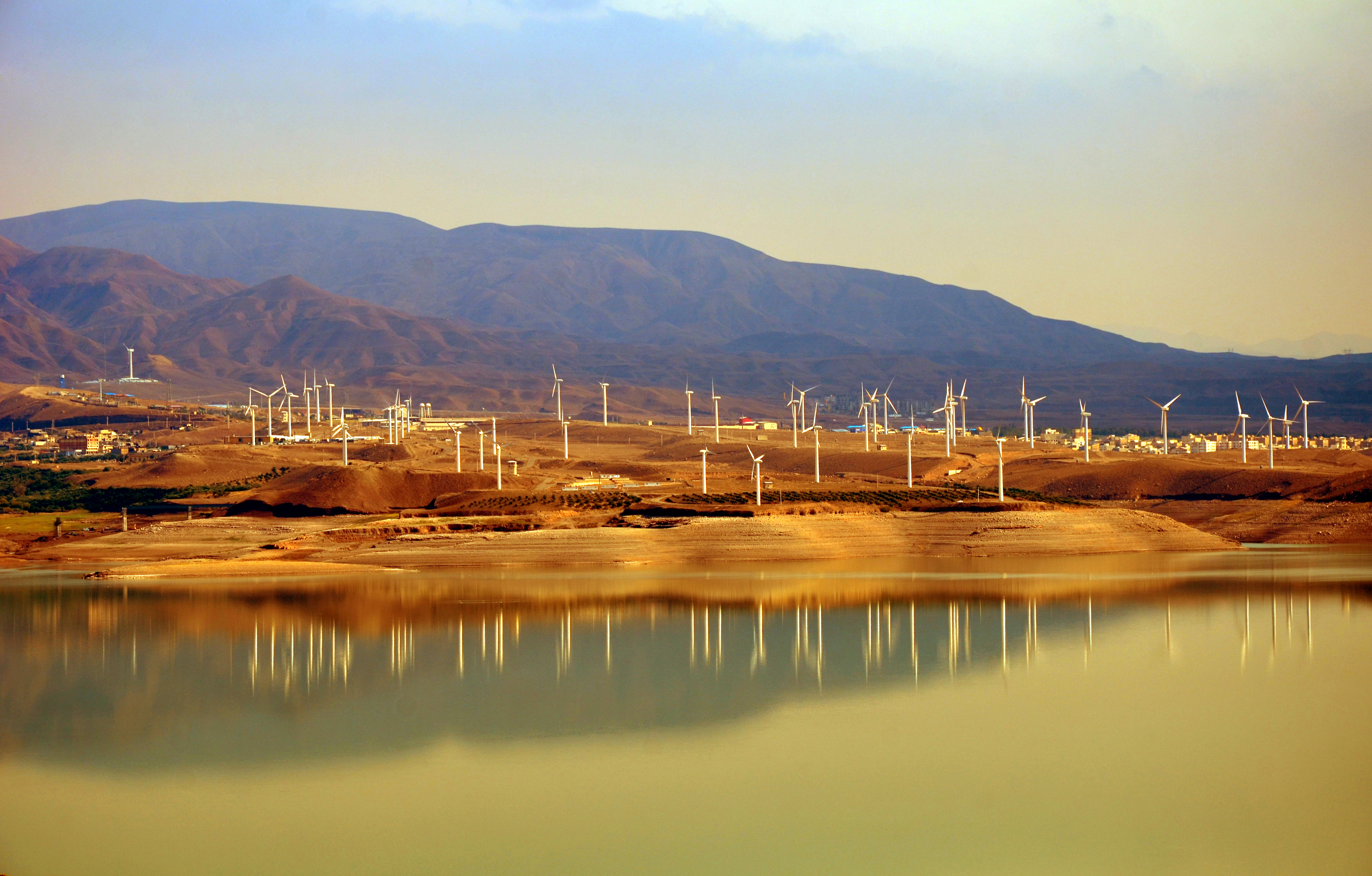

- Location within Iran
- Coordinates: 36°40′52″N 49°20′48″E
- Country: Iran
- Province: Qazvin
- County: Qazvin
- District: Tarom-e Sofla
- Rural District: Khandan

Population (2016)
  - Total: 754
- Time zone: UTC+3:30 (IRST)

Siah Push (Persian: سياه پوش) (Note: Also romanized as Seyāh Pūsh, Sīāh Pūsh, and Sīyāh Pūsh; also known as Siyapush) is a village in, and the capital of, Khandan Rural District in Tarom-e Sofla District of Qazvin County, in Iran's northwestern Qazvin province.

== Demographics ==
=== Population ===
At the time of the 2006 National Census, the village's population was 265 in 97 households. The following census in 2011 counted 917 people in 378 households. The 2016 census measured the population of the village as 754 people in 261 households.
