= Gavanaj =

Village in Qazvin province, Iran

Gavanaj Persian: گونج
- Village
- Location within Iran
- Coordinates: 36°28′18″N 49°18′32″E
- Country: Iran
- Province: Qazvin
- County: Qazvin
- District: Tarom-e Sofla
- Rural District: Niyarak

Population (2016)
  - Total: 288
- Time zone: UTC+3:30 (IRST)

Gavanaj (Persian: گونج) (Note: Also romanized as Goonaj; also known as Gavanah, Gavanakh, Gavanīch, and Gūyanj) is a village in Niyarak Rural District of Tarom-e Sofla District in Qazvin County, Qazvin province, Iran.

== Demographics ==
=== Population ===
At the time of the 2006 National Census, the village's population was 196 in 48 households. The following census in 2011 counted 176 people in 52 households. The 2016 census measured the population of the village as 288 people in 99 households.
