= Tarazan-e Olya =

Tarazan-e Olya طرازان عليا
- Village
- Location within Iran
- Coordinates: 36°29′35″N 49°30′45″E
- Country: Iran
- Province: Qazvin
- County: Qazvin
- Bakhsh: Tarom Sofla
- Rural District: Kuhgir

Population (2006)
  - Total: 115
- Time zone: UTC+3:30 (IRST)
  - Summer (DST): UTC+4:30 (IRDT)

Tarazan-e Olya (Persian: طرازان عليا, also Romanized as Ţarāzān-e ‘Olyā; also known as Ţarāzān-e Bālā) is a village in Kuhgir Rural District, Tarom Sofla District, Qazvin County, Qazvin Province, Iran. At the 2006 census, its population was 115, in 36 families.
