= Hesar, Qazvin =

Village in Qazvin province, Iran

Hesar Persian: حصار
- Village
- Location within Iran
- Coordinates: 36°29′54″N 49°06′44″E
- Country: Iran
- Province: Qazvin
- County: Qazvin
- District: Tarom-e Sofla
- Rural District: Chuqur

Population (2016)
  - Total: 440
- Time zone: UTC+3:30 (IRST)

Hesar (Persian: حصار) (Note: Also romanized as Ḩeşār; also known as Hisār and Khisar) is a village in, and the capital of, Chuqur Rural District in Tarom-e Sofla District of Qazvin County, Qazvin province, Iran.

== Demographics ==
=== Population ===
At the time of the 2006 National Census, the village's population was 180 in 47 households. The following census in 2011 counted 221 people in 82 households. The 2016 census measured the population of the village as 440 people in 149 households. It was the most populous village in its rural district.
