= Altin Kosh =

Village in Qazvin province, Iran

Altin Kosh Persian: التين كش
- Village
- Location within Iran
- Coordinates: 36°43′34″N 49°08′06″E
- Country: Iran
- Province: Qazvin
- County: Qazvin
- District: Tarom-e Sofla
- Rural District: Khandan

Population (2016)
  - Total: 1,213
- Time zone: UTC+3:30 (IRST)

Altin Kosh (Persian: التين كش) (Note: Also romanized as Āltīn Kosh; also known as Altūnkosh and Altunkush) is a village in Khandan Rural District of Tarom-e Sofla District in Qazvin County, Qazvin province, Iran.

== Demographics ==
=== Population ===
At the time of the 2006 National Census, the village's population was 973 in 256 households. The following census in 2011 counted 878 people in 314 households. The 2016 census measured the population of the village as 1,213 people in 411 households.
