= Vangin =

Village in Qazvin province, Iran

Vangin Persian: ونگين
- Village
- Location within Iran
- Coordinates: 36°29′01″N 49°22′09″E
- Country: Iran
- Province: Qazvin
- County: Qazvin
- District: Tarom-e Sofla
- Rural District: Niyarak

Population (2016)
  - Total: 436
- Time zone: UTC+3:30 (IRST)

Vangin (Persian: ونگين) (Note: Also romanized as Vangīn and Wangin) is a village in Niyarak Rural District of Tarom-e Sofla District in Qazvin County, Qazvin province, Iran.

== Demographics ==
=== Population ===
At the time of the 2006 National Census, the village's population was 64 in 18 households. The following census in 2011 counted 195 people in 57 households. The 2016 census measured the population of the village as 436 people in 140 households.
