= Qarkhun, Qazvin =

Qarkhun قارخون
- Village
- Location within Iran
- Coordinates: 36°29′31″N 49°10′05″E
- Country: Iran
- Province: Qazvin
- County: Qazvin
- Bakhsh: Tarom Sofla
- Rural District: Chuqur

Population (2006)
  - Total: 108
- Time zone: UTC+3:30 (IRST)
  - Summer (DST): UTC+4:30 (IRDT)

Qarkhun (Persian: قارخون, also Romanized as Qārkhūn, Karkhān, and Kar-Khun) is a village in Chuqur Rural District, Tarom Sofla District, Qazvin County, Qazvin Province, Iran. At the 2006 census, its population was 108, in 24 families.
