= Bon Zohreh =

Village in Qazvin province, Iran

Bon Zohreh Persian: بن زهره
- Village
- Location within Iran
- Country: Iran
- Province: Qazvin
- County: Qazvin
- District: Tarom-e Sofla
- Rural District: Kuhgir

Population (2016)
  - Total: 511
- Time zone: UTC+3:30 (IRST)

Bon Zohreh (Persian: بن زهره) (Note: Also known as Shirin Su and Bon Zohreh (شيرين سو و بن زهره)) is a village in, Kuhgir Rural District of Tarom-e Sofla District in Qazvin County, Qazvin province, Iran.

== Demographics ==
=== Population ===
At the time of the 2006 National Census, the village's population was 270 in 78 households. The following census in 2011 counted 200 people in 71 households. The 2016 census measured the population of the village as 511 people in 168 households.
