= Razan, Qazvin =

Village in Qazvin province, Iran

Razan Persian: رزان
- Village
- Location within Iran
- Coordinates: 36°30′30″N 49°12′06″E
- Country: Iran
- Province: Qazvin
- County: Qazvin
- District: Tarom-e Sofla
- Rural District: Chuqur

Population (2016)
  - Total: 216
- Time zone: UTC+3:30 (IRST)

Razan (Persian: رزان) (Note: Also romanized as Razān; also known as Razak) is a village in Chuqur Rural District of Tarom-e Sofla District in Qazvin County, Qazvin province, Iran.

== Demographics ==
=== Population ===
At the time of the 2006 National Census, the village's population was 71 in 13 households. The following census in 2011 counted 87 people in 55 households. The 2016 census measured the population of the village as 216 people in 65 households.
