= Sankan =

Sankan may refer to:

- Samhan, a period in Korean history
- Sangan (disambiguation), various places
