= Yuzbashi Chay =

Village in Qazvin province, Iran

Yuzbashi Chay Persian: يوزباشي چاي
- Village
- Location within Iran
- Coordinates: 36°23′44″N 49°29′04″E
- Country: Iran
- Province: Qazvin
- County: Qazvin
- District: Tarom-e Sofla
- Rural District: Kuhgir

Population (2016)
  - Total: 671
- Time zone: UTC+3:30 (IRST)

Yuzbashi Chay (Persian: يوزباشي چاي) (Note: Also romanized as Yūzbāshī Chāy; also known as Yūzbāsh Chāy) is a village in Kuhgir Rural District of Tarom-e Sofla District in Qazvin County, Qazvin province, Iran.

== Demographics ==
=== Population ===
At the time of the 2006 National Census, the village's population was 523 in 120 households. The following census in 2011 counted 233 people in 73 households. The 2016 census measured the population of the village as 671 people in 192 households.
