= Tuinan =

Village in Qazvin province, Iran

Tuinan Persian: توينان
- Village
- Location within Iran
- Coordinates: 36°29′02″N 49°34′45″E
- Country: Iran
- Province: Qazvin
- County: Qazvin
- District: Tarom-e Sofla
- Rural District: Kuhgir

Population (2016)
  - Total: 324
- Time zone: UTC+3:30 (IRST)

Tuinan (Persian: توينان) (Note: Also romanized as Ţūīnān; also known as Ţūnīān and Tūnīān) is a village in Kuhgir Rural District of Tarom-e Sofla District in Qazvin County, Qazvin province, Iran.

== Demographics ==
=== Population ===
At the time of the 2006 National Census, the village's population was 200 in 52 households. The following census in 2011 counted 137 people in 47 households. The 2016 census measured the population of the village as 324 people in 100 households.
