= Qushchi, Qazvin =

Village in Qazvin province, Iran

Qushchi Persian: قوشچي
- Village
- Location within Iran
- Coordinates: 36°40′00″N 49°19′15″E
- Country: Iran
- Province: Qazvin
- County: Qazvin
- District: Tarom-e Sofla
- Rural District: Khandan

Population (2016)
  - Total: 485
- Time zone: UTC+3:30 (IRST)

Qushchi (Persian: قوشچي) (Note: Also romanized as Qūshchī) is a village in Khandan Rural District of Tarom-e Sofla District in Qazvin County, Qazvin province, Iran.

== Demographics ==
=== Population ===
At the time of the 2006 National Census, the village's population was 201 in 62 households. The following census in 2011 counted 169 people in 50 households. The 2016 census measured the population of the village as 485 people in 162 households.
