= Sangan-e Pain =

Sangan-e Pain (Persian: سَنگانِ پائين) may refer to:

- Sangan, Razavi Khorasan
- Sangan, South Khorasan
- Sangan, Tehran
- Sangan-e Sofla, Qazvin
