= Morteza Nak =

Village in Qazvin province, Iran

Morteza Nak Persian: مرتضي نك
- Village
- Location within Iran
- Coordinates: 36°40′04″N 49°20′45″E
- Country: Iran
- Province: Qazvin
- County: Qazvin
- District: Tarom-e Sofla
- Rural District: Khandan

Population (2016)
  - Total: 374
- Time zone: UTC+3:30 (IRST)

Morteza Nak (Persian: مرتضي نك) (Note: Also romanized as Morteẕá Nak) is a village in Khandan Rural District of Tarom-e Sofla District in Qazvin County, Qazvin province, Iran.

== Demographics ==
=== Population ===
At the time of the 2006 National Census, the village's population was 98 in 37 households. The following census in 2011 counted 116 people in 46 households. The 2016 census measured the population of the village as 374 people in 132 households.
