= Barooj =

Barooj may refer to:

- Baruj, East Azerbaijan Province, Iran
- Barvaj, Qazvin Province, Iran
- Burooj, Surah Al Burooj
- Burooj, Burooj Me
- Brooj, Sitara Brooj Akbar
