= Mohammad Deh =

Village in Qazvin province, Iran

Mohammad Deh Persian: محمدده
- Village
- Location within Iran
- Coordinates: 36°30′49″N 49°16′17″E
- Country: Iran
- Province: Qazvin
- County: Qazvin
- District: Tarom-e Sofla
- Rural District: Khandan

Population (2016)
  - Total: 302
- Time zone: UTC+3:30 (IRST)

Mohammad Deh (Persian: محمدده) (Note: Also romanized as Moḩammad Deh; also known as Mamdeh and Mamiye) is a village in Khandan Rural District of Tarom-e Sofla District in Qazvin County, Qazvin province, Iran.

== Demographics ==
=== Population ===
At the time of the 2006 National Census, the village's population was 313 in 50 households. The following census in 2011 counted 161 people in 55 households. The 2016 census measured the population of the village as 302 people in 81 households.
