= Mir Khavand-e Sofla =

Village in Qazvin, Iran

Mir Khavand-e Sofla ميرخواندسفلي
- Village
- Location within Iran
- Coordinates: 36°39′59″N 49°24′58″E
- Country: Iran
- Province: Qazvin
- County: Qazvin
- Bakhsh: Tarom Sofla
- Rural District: Khandan

Population (2006)
  - Total: 218
- Time zone: UTC+3:30 (IRST)
  - Summer (DST): UTC+4:30 (IRDT)

Mir Khavand-e Sofla (Persian: ميرخواندسفلي, also Romanized as Mīr Khavānd-e Soflá and Mīr Khovand-e Soflá; also known as Mīr Khvān-e Pā’īn, Mīr Khovān-e Pā’īn, Mīr Khovān Pā’īn, and Mīr Khūnd-e Pā’īn) is a village in Khandan Rural District, Tarom Sofla District, Qazvin County, Qazvin Province, Iran. At the 2006 census, its population was 218, in 54 families.
