= Najafabad, Tarom-e Sofla =

Village in Qazvin province, Iran

Najafabad Persian: نجف اباد
- Village
- Location within Iran
- Coordinates: 36°27′35″N 49°16′34″E
- Country: Iran
- Province: Qazvin
- County: Qazvin
- District: Tarom-e Sofla
- Rural District: Niyarak

Population (2016)
  - Total: 305
- Time zone: UTC+3:30 (IRST)

Najafabad (Persian: نجف اباد) (Note: Also romanized as Nadzhafabad and Najafābād) is a village in Niyarak Rural District of Tarom-e Sofla District in Qazvin County, Qazvin province, Iran.

== Demographics ==
=== Population ===
At the time of the 2006 National Census, the village's population was 150 in 43 households. The following census in 2011 counted 234 people in 67 households. The 2016 census measured the population of the village as 305 people in 101 households.
