= Zanzan =

Zanzan may refer to:

- Zanzan Atte-Oudeyi (born 1980), Togolese footballer
- Zanzan District, Ivory Coast
- Zanzan Region, a defunct region of Ivory Coast

== See also ==
- Zanjan (disambiguation)
