= Zanjanrud =

Zanjanrud (Persian: زنجانرود) may refer to:

- Zanjanrud, Iran, a village in Zanjan Province
- Zanjanrud District, an administrative subdivision of Zanjan Province
- Zanjanrud-e Bala Rural District, an administrative subdivision of Zanjan Province
- Zanjanrud-e Pain Rural District, an administrative subdivision of Zanjan Province

== See also ==
- Zanjan (disambiguation)
