= Shizar, Qazvin =

Village in Qazvin province, Iran

Shizar Persian: شيزر
- Village
- Location within Iran
- Coordinates: 36°39′26″N 49°02′31″E
- Country: Iran
- Province: Qazvin
- County: Qazvin
- District: Tarom-e Sofla
- Rural District: Khandan

Population (2016)
  - Total: 362
- Time zone: UTC+3:30 (IRST)

Shizar (Persian: شيزر, also romanized as Shīzar; also known as Chīzar is a village in Khandan Rural District of Tarom-e Sofla District in Qazvin County, Qazvin province, Iran.

== Demographics ==
=== Population ===
At the time of the 2006 National Census, the village's population was 125 in 42 households. The following census in 2011 counted 263 people in 119 households. The 2016 census measured the population of the village as 362 people in 133 households.
