= Sangan-e Olya =

Sangan-e Olya سنگان عليا
- Village
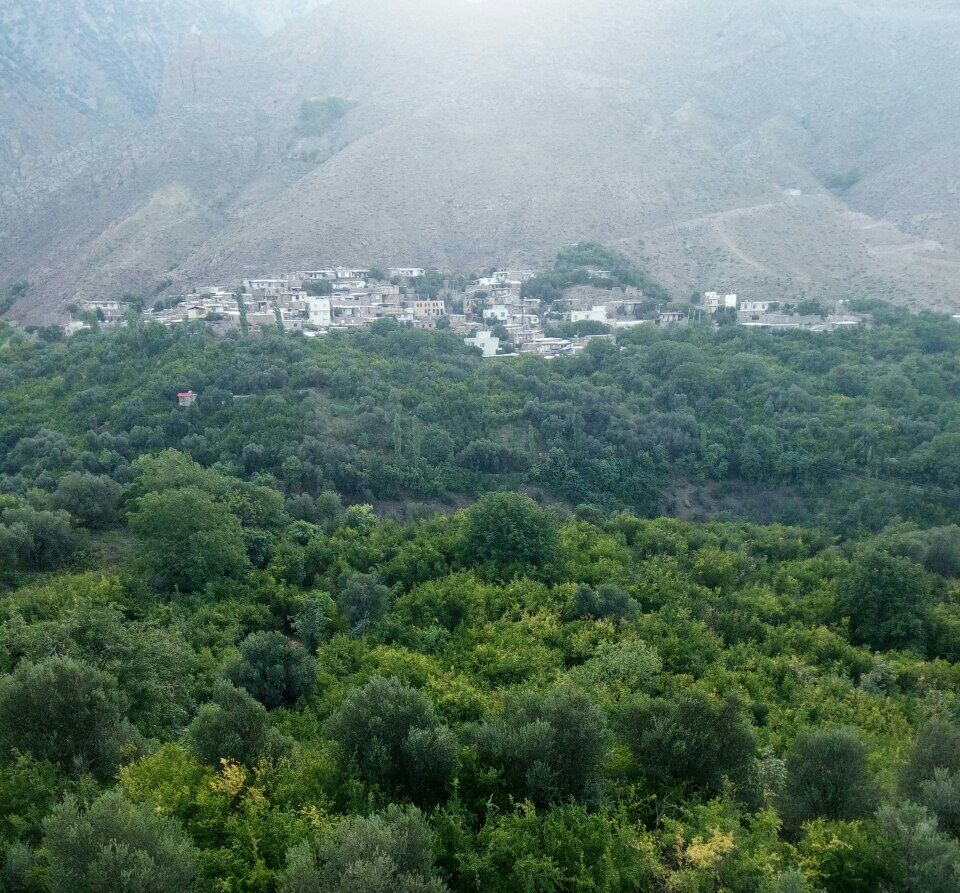

- Location within Iran
- Coordinates: 36°37′49″N 49°19′49″E
- Country: Iran
- Province: Qazvin
- County: Qazvin
- Bakhsh: Tarom Sofla
- Rural District: Khandan

Population (2006)
  - Total: 171
- Time zone: UTC+3:30 (IRST)
  - Summer (DST): UTC+4:30 (IRDT)

Sangan-e Olya (Persian: سنگان عليا, Azerbaijani: Seyidlər also Romanized as Sangān-e ‘Olyā; also known as Sangān, Sangak, Sangān-e Bālā, Sangyak, Sankān, and Zangān) is a village in Khandan Rural District, Tarom Sofla District, Qazvin County, Qazvin Province, Iran. At the 2006 census, its population was 171, in 47 families. This village is populated by Azerbaijani Turks.
