= Sirdan =

City in Qazvin province, Iran

Sirdan Persian: سيردان
- City
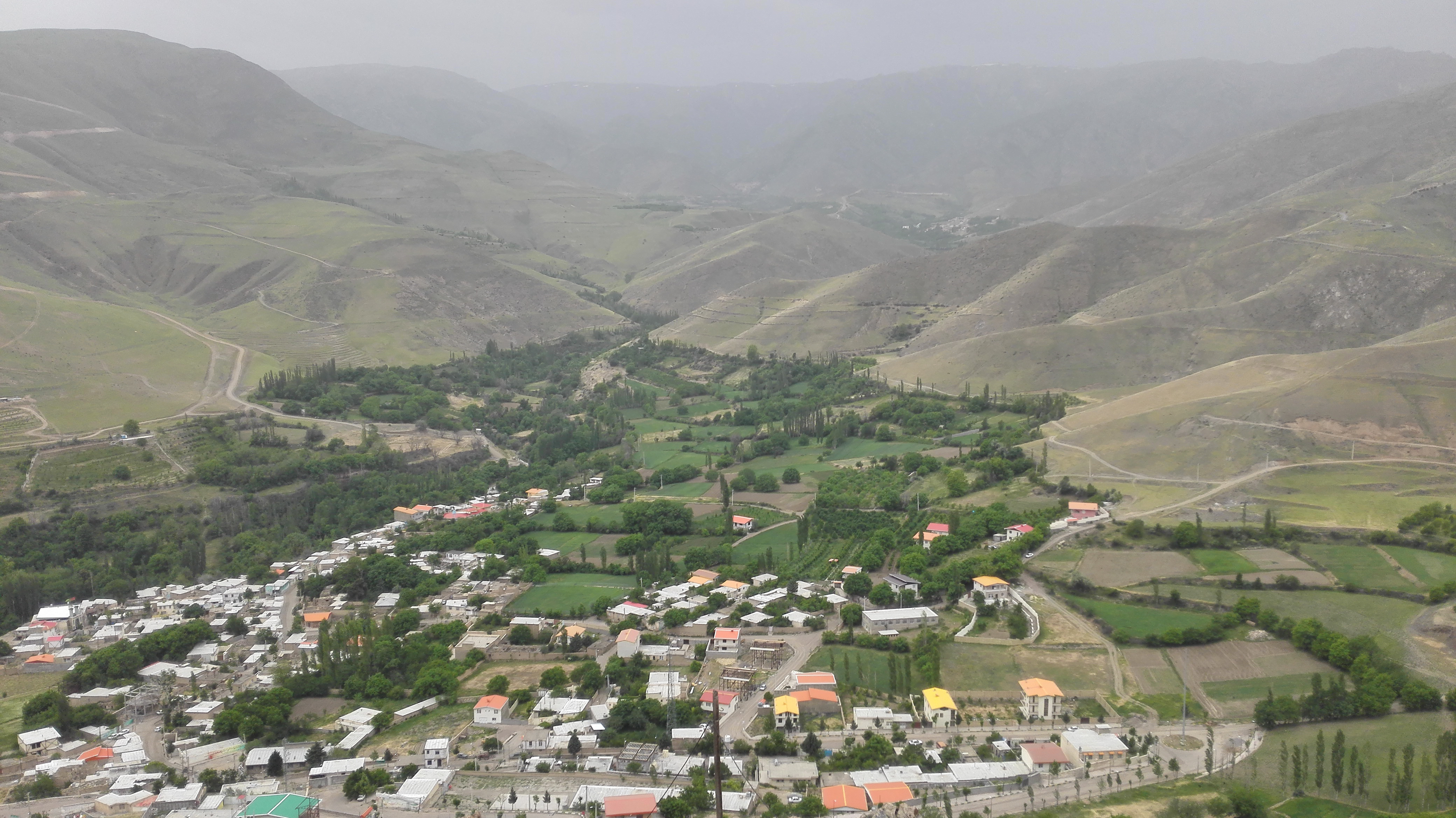
- The city of Sirdan

- Location within Iran
- Coordinates: 36°38′50″N 49°11′30″E
- Country: Iran
- Province: Qazvin
- County: Qazvin
- District: Tarom-e Sofla
- Established as a city: 2005

Population (2016)
  - Total: 805
- Time zone: UTC+3:30 (IRST)

Sirdan (Persian: سيردان) (Note: Also romanized as Sīrdān; also known as Sardān and Serdan) is a city in, and the capital of, Tarom-e Sofla District of Qazvin County, Qazvin province, Iran. The village of Sirdan was converted to a city in 2005.

== Demographics ==
=== Population ===
At the time of the 2006 National Census, the city's population was 462 in 182 households. The following census in 2011 counted 1,038 people in 403 households. The 2016 census measured the population of the city as 805 people in 300 households.
