= Mir Khavand-e Olya =

Village in Qazvin province, Iran

Mir Khavand-e Olya Persian: ميرخواندعليا
- Village
- Location within Iran
- Coordinates: 36°39′22″N 49°24′06″E
- Country: Iran
- Province: Qazvin
- County: Qazvin
- District: Tarom-e Sofla
- Rural District: Khandan

Population (2016)
  - Total: 404
- Time zone: UTC+3:30 (IRST)

Mir Khavand-e Olya (Persian: ميرخواندعليا) (Note: Also romanized as Mīr Khavānd-e ‘Olyā; also known as Mīr Khūnd-e Bālā and Mīr Khvān-e Bālā) is a village in Khandan Rural District of Tarom-e Sofla District in Qazvin County, Qazvin province, Iran.

== Demographics ==
=== Population ===
At the time of the 2006 National Census, the village's population was 408 in 116 households. The following census in 2011 counted 306 people in 100 households. The 2016 census measured the population of the village as 404 people in 124 households.
