= Zarand, Qazvin =

Village in Qazvin province, Iran

Zarand Persian: زرند
- Village
- Location within Iran
- Coordinates: 36°28′52″N 49°08′33″E
- Country: Iran
- Province: Qazvin
- County: Qazvin
- District: Tarom-e Sofla
- Rural District: Chuqur

Population (2016)
  - Total: 250
- Time zone: UTC+3:30 (IRST)

Zarand (Persian: زرند) is a village in Chuqur Rural District of Tarom-e Sofla District in Qazvin County, Qazvin province, Iran.

== Demographics ==
=== Population ===
At the time of the 2006 National Census, the village's population was 196 in 46 households. The following census in 2011 counted 218 people in 67 households. The 2016 census measured the population of the village as 250 people in 86 households.
