= Tarazan-e Sofla =

Village in Qazvin province, Iran

Tarazan-e Sofla Persian: طرازان سفلي
- Village
- Location within Iran
- Coordinates: 36°29′54″N 49°31′02″E
- Country: Iran
- Province: Qazvin
- County: Qazvin
- District: Tarom-e Sofla
- Rural District: Kuhgir

Population (2016)
  - Total: 276
- Time zone: UTC+3:30 (IRST)

Tarazan-e Sofla (Persian: طرازان سفلي) (Note: Also romanized as Ţarāzān-e Soflá) is a village in Kuhgir Rural District of Tarom-e Sofla District in Qazvin County, Qazvin province, Iran.

== Demographics ==
=== Population ===
At the time of the 2006 National Census, the village's population was 245 in 73 households. The following census in 2011 counted 104 people in 38 households. The 2016 census measured the population of the village as 276 people in 83 households.
