= Khakineh-ye Bala =

Village in Qazvin province, Iran

Khakineh-ye Bala Persian: خاكينه بالا
- Village
- Location within Iran
- Coordinates: 36°36′59″N 49°26′00″E
- Country: Iran
- Province: Qazvin
- County: Qazvin
- District: Tarom-e Sofla
- Rural District: Niyarak

Population (2016)
  - Total: 241
- Time zone: UTC+3:30 (IRST)

Khakineh-ye Bala (Persian: خاكينه بالا) (Note: Also romanized as Khākīneh-ye Bālā; also known as Khāgīnah, Khaginakh, Khāgīneh, Khākīneh, and Khākīneh-ye ‘Olyā) is a village in Niyarak Rural District of Tarom-e Sofla District in Qazvin County, Qazvin province, Iran.

== Demographics ==
=== Population ===
At the time of the 2006 National Census, the village's population was 166 in 37 households. The following census in 2011 counted 159 people in 44 households. The 2016 census measured the population of the village as 241 people in 89 households.
