= Niyarak =

Village in Qazvin province, Iran

Niyarak Persian: نیارک
- Village
- Location within Iran
- Coordinates: 36°31′12″N 49°25′06″E
- Country: Iran
- Province: Qazvin
- County: Qazvin
- District: Tarom-e Sofla
- Rural District: Niyarak

Population (2016)
  - Total: 1,860
- Time zone: UTC+3:30 (IRST)

Niyarak (Persian: نیارک) (Note: Also romanized as Neyarak, Nīārak, and Nīyārak; also known as Niaraki and Nīarīk; and Azerbaijani: Niyərik and Nəyərik) is a village in, and the capital of, Niyarak Rural District in Tarom-e Sofla District of Qazvin County, Qazvin province, Iran. The previous capital of the rural district was the village of Kuhgir-e Sofla.

== Demographics ==
=== Language and ethnicity ===
The people of Niyarak are Azerbaijani and speak Azerbaijani Turkish. Most of the families are still residing in the city of Qazvin but few of the main families have migrated to the northern province of Gilan.

=== Population ===
At the time of the 2006 National Census, the village's population was 590 in 204 households. The following census in 2011 counted 1,350 people in 461 households. The 2016 census measured the population of the village as 1,860 people in 660 households. It was the most populous village in its rural district.
