= Kuhgir Rural District =

Rural district in Qazvin province, Iran

Kuhgir Rural District Persian: دهستان كوهگير
- Rural District
- Location within Iran
- Coordinates: 36°28′N 49°29′E
- Country: Iran
- Province: Qazvin
- County: Qazvin
- District: Tarom-e Sofla
- Established: 1997
- Capital: Kuhgir-e Sofla

Population (2016)
  - Total: 4,547
- Time zone: UTC+3:30 (IRST)

Kuhgir Rural District (Persian: دهستان كوهگير) is in Tarom-e Sofla District of Qazvin County, Qazvin province, Iran. Its capital is the village of Kuhgir-e Sofla, which was the capital of Niyarak Rural District until its capital was transferred to the village of Niyarak.

== Demographics ==
=== Population ===
At the time of the 2006 National Census, the rural district's population was 2,873 in 734 households. There were 1,861 inhabitants in 615 households at the following census of 2011. The 2016 census measured the population of the rural district as 4,547 in 1,385 households. The most populous of its 33 villages was Kuhgir-e Sofla, with 895 people.

=== Other villages in the rural district ===
- Bon Zohreh
- Kuhgir-e Olya
- Somaq
- Tarazan-e Sofla
- Tuinan
- Yuzbashi Chay
