= Zahabad =

Village in Qazvin province, Iran

Zahabad Persian: زه اباد
- Village
- Location within Iran
- Coordinates: 36°28′38″N 49°25′11″E
- Country: Iran
- Province: Qazvin
- County: Qazvin
- District: Tarom-e Sofla
- Rural District: Niyarak

Population (2016)
  - Total: 241
- Time zone: UTC+3:30 (IRST)

Zahabad (Persian: زه اباد) (Note: Also romanized as Zahābād and Zehābād; also known as Zabad) is a village in Niyarak Rural District of Tarom-e Sofla District in Qazvin County, Qazvin province, Iran.

== Demographics ==
=== Population ===
At the time of the 2006 National Census, the village's population was 44 in 13 households. The following census in 2011 counted 198 people in 65 households. The 2016 census measured the population of the village as 241 people in 58 households.
