= Zanjan =

Zanjan may refer to:

- Zanjan province, Iran
- Zanjan County, an area within Zanjan Province
- Zanjan, Iran, the capital of Zanjan County and Zanjan Province
- University of Zanjan, in the city of Zanjan
- Zanjan Airport, an airport serving Zanjan, Iran

== See also ==
- Zanzan (disambiguation)
- Zanjanrud (disambiguation)
- Sanjan (disambiguation)
- Senjan, a city in Markazi Province, Iran
