= Sanjana =

Sanjana is a common Indian feminine given name, meaning "gentle" or "peaceful". Notable people with the given name include:

- Sanjana Agri, Indian politician
- Sanjana Anand (born 1995), Indian actress
- Sanjana Bathula, Indian speed skating track athlete
- Sanjana Gandhi (born 1995), Indian actress
- Sanjjanaa Galrani (born 1989), Indian model and actress
- Sanjana Kapoor (born 1967), Indian actress
- Sanjana Ramesh (born 2001), Indian basketball player
- Sanjana Sanghi (born 1996), Indian actress and model
- Sanjana Sarathy (born 1993), Indian actress and model
- Sanjana Singh, Indian actress

== See also ==
- Sanju Aau Sanjana, a 2010 Odia film
- Sanjna, a Hindu goddess
- Sanjan (disambiguation)
