= Orkan-e Kord =

Village in Qazvin province, Iran

Orkan-e Kord Persian: اوركن كرد
- Village
- Location within Iran
- Coordinates: 36°37′56″N 49°22′55″E
- Country: Iran
- Province: Qazvin
- County: Qazvin
- District: Tarom-e Sofla
- Rural District: Khandan

Population (2016)
  - Total: 1,787
- Time zone: UTC+3:30 (IRST)

Orkan-e Kord (Persian: اوركن كرد) (Note: Also romanized as Orkān-e Kord; also known as Orgān-e Kord) is a village in Khandan Rural District of Tarom-e Sofla District in Qazvin County, Qazvin province, Iran.

== Demographics ==
=== Population ===
At the time of the 2006 National Census, the village's population was 1,349 in 338 households. The following census in 2011 counted 1,247 people in 414 households. The 2016 census measured the population of the village as 1,787 people in 585 households. It was the most populous village in its rural district.
