= Ardak, Qazvin =

Village in Qazvin province, Iran

Ardak Persian: اردک
- Village
- Location within Iran
- Coordinates: 36°29′47″N 49°14′31″E
- Country: Iran
- Province: Qazvin
- County: Qazvin
- District: Tarom-e Sofla
- Rural District: Chuqur

Population (2016)
  - Total: 366
- Time zone: UTC+3:30 (IRST)

Ardak (Persian: اردک) is a village in Chuqur Rural District of Tarom-e Sofla District in Qazvin County, Qazvin province, Iran.

== Demographics ==
=== Population ===
At the time of the 2006 National Census, the village's population was 376 in 70 households. The following census in 2011 counted 275 people in 72 households. The 2016 census measured the population of the village as 366 people in 101 households.
