= Sangan, Chabahar =

Sangan سنگان
- Village
- Location within Iran
- Coordinates: 25°32′39″N 61°17′04″E
- Country: Iran
- Province: Sistan and Baluchestan
- County: Chabahar
- Bakhsh: Dashtiari
- Rural District: Bahu Kalat

Population (2006)
  - Total: 707
- Time zone: UTC+3:30 (IRST)
  - Summer (DST): UTC+4:30 (IRDT)

Sangan (Persian: سنگان, also Romanized as Sangān and Sengān; also known as Sankān and Singān) is a village in Bahu Kalat Rural District, Dashtiari District, Chabahar County, Sistan and Baluchestan Province, Iran. At the 2006 census, its population was 707, in 113 families.
