= Kanwa Asian Defence =

Canadian military magazine

- Editor: Andrei Pinkov
- Categories: Military
- Frequency: Monthly
- Publisher: Kanwa Information Center
- First issue: 2004
- Country: Canada
- Language: English, Chinese
- Website: www.kanwa.com/en/edr.php
- ISSN: 1913-3677
- OCLC: 190795370

Kanwa Asian Defence is a monthly Canadian military magazine published by the Kanwa Information Center. It is published monthly in English and Chinese versions, the latter entitled 漢和防務評論 (Kanwa Defence Review). The magazine publishes news articles, raw images, and reference reports about China and East Asia's military, foreign affairs, and national defence. The founder and editor-in-chief is Zhang Yihong (Chinese: 张毅弘), better known by his pen name Andrei Pinkov (Chinese: 平可夫).

The name of the magazine in Chinese means Han (Kan, 漢) and Yamato (Wo, 和).
