= 2020 Swiss referendums =

Several federal referendums were held in Switzerland in 2020, with voting on 9 February, 27 September and 29 November. Voting was also planned for 17 May, but was postponed due to the COVID-19 pandemic.

== February referendums ==
Two referendums were held on 9 February, with voters asked whether they approve of a popular initiative to increase affordable housing by promoting housing cooperatives, and an optional referendum on whether legislation preventing discrimination based on sexual orientation should be overturned or retained.

The affordable housing initiative – to require 10% of new flats to be owned by housing cooperatives and abolish government subsidies for renovating luxury flats – was put forward by the national alliance of tenants' association and supported by left-leaning parties, and was approved after 106,000 signatures were submitted. The vote on the anti-discrimination in respect of sexual orientation legislation was initiated by the Federal Democratic Union and the youth wing of the Swiss People's Party (Young SVP) after the legislation was approved in December 2018. A December 2019 opinion poll showed support for the affordable housing at 66% with 30% against, while overturning the anti-discrimination legislation had the support of only 28% of voters, with 69% against.

The affordable housing proposal was rejected by 57% of voters, although more than 60% voted in favour in Basel and Geneva, areas more affected by the lack of affordable housing. The anti-discrimination legislation was approved by 63% of voters, with the strongest support in the canton of Vaud.

=== Results ===
Question	For			Against			Invalid/ blank	Total votes	Registered voters	Turnout	Outcome
Question	Votes	%	Cantons	Votes	%	Cantons	Invalid/ blank	Total votes	Registered voters	Turnout	Outcome
Affordable housing	963,740	42.95	4 1/2	1,280,331	57.05	16 5/2	34,837	2,278,908	5,467,714	41.68	Rejected
Retaining anti-discrimination legislation	1,414,160	63.09	–	827,235	36.91	–	38,366	2,279,761	5,467,714	41.69	Approved
Source: Federal Chancellery, Federal Chancellery

== September referendums ==
Three referendums were initially scheduled for 17 May 2020 but were rescheduled (by a decision of the Federal Council of 18 March 2020) for 27 September 2020 due to the COVID-19 pandemic. This was the first cancellation of a federal referendum since 1951 when polling was postponed due to an outbreak of foot-and-mouth disease. The referendums were: one on the "For moderate immigration (limitation initiative)" popular initiative; one on a 2019 amendment of the federal Law on Hunting; and one on the 2019 amendment of the Federal Law on Federal Direct Tax regarding tax deductions for childcare expenses.

=== Immigration restriction referendum ===
The immigration initiative proposed ending the free movement of people into Switzerland with the European Union (EU) that was initially granted under the 1999 Agreement on the Free Movement of People. Under the agreements, citizens of the EU have the right to live and work in Switzerland and citizens of Switzerland have the right to live and work in the EU. The government recognizes professional qualifications, the right to buy property and social insurance benefits. The referendum, which was sponsored by the Swiss People's Party (SVP), requires that the government terminate the agreement within one year of passage. It would also bar the government from concluding any agreements that would grant the free movement of people to foreign nationals.

Between 1990 and 2020, the population of Switzerland increased from 6.6 million to 8.6 million. Of the total population, 25% are non-Swiss, with most of those being primarily from the EU. This is the second major anti-immigration initiative supported by the SVP in the last decade. The 2014 Swiss immigration initiative passed with a narrow majority of 50.33%; however protracted negotiations with the EU resulted in a 2016 compromise agreement that the SVP criticized as weak. The SVP has argued that the free movement hurts older Swiss workers, who would lose their jobs to young immigrants from the EU. Opponents have argued that, because of guillotine clauses in the bilateral agreements with the EU, this would terminate the Bilateral I agreements with the EU which include provisions on the reduction of trade barriers as well as barriers in agriculture, land transport and civil aviation. Germany is Switzerland's largest market with more cross-border trade amounting to more than Switzerland's trade with China and the United States combined. Most major parties in Switzerland oppose the initiative. The referendum failed to pass.

=== Federal tax allowance for children referendum ===
The referendum on the federal tax allowance for children was supported by the Social Democratic Party. In 2019, the Parliament approved a law to increase the income allowance for children from 6,500 to 10,000 CHF. The benefits would flow to those that pay the federal direct tax, which would include approximately 60% of families, primarily with taxable income above 100,000 CHF; the Social Democratic Party opposed the changes, charging that they would benefit wealthier families and sought the referendum to block the implementation. The think tank Avenir Suisse estimated that the increase in the child allowance, if passed, would cost 370 million CHF in lost revenue.

=== Hunting law referendum ===
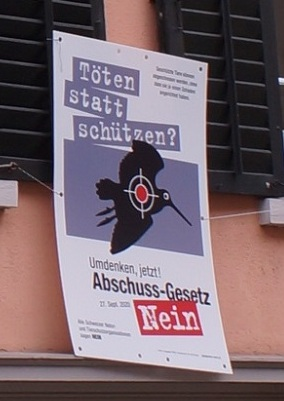
Placard (in German) against the revised hunting law.

The hunting law referendum asked voters whether legal changes making it easier to kill wolves should be blocked. The changes were approved by the Federal Council and the parliament. After the reintroduction of wolves to Switzerland, packs have increased and 300 to 500 farm animals are killed by wolves each year. Prior to the change, the hunting law allowed killing wolves only if they have killed more than 25 goats or sheep within one month. The changes in the law would allow preemptive hunting of wolves if they are too close to herds or villages. It would also limit compensation to farmers that do not protect their herds with dogs or fences. Opponents argued that killing of wolves could increase attacks on livestock as it would disintegrate packs and force young wolves to hunt for easy prey rather than big game. The Green Party and the Social Democratic Party joined with animal conservation groups to oppose implementation of the new law. They submitted 65,000 valid signatures to place the measure on the ballot.

=== Fighter jet purchase referendum ===
The referendum to block the purchase of new fighter aircraft to replace the Swiss military's existing fleet of F-5s and F/A-18s was supported by the Group for a Switzerland Without an Army, the Social Democratic Party and the Green Party. The Federal Council and the Parliament had approved the purchase at a cost of 6 billion CHF. Viola Amherd, the head of the Defence Department, supported the purchase because the existing F-5s are more than 40 years old and fly only in good weather and the useful life of the F-18 will end in 2030. The opponents have branded the purchase as wasteful and argued that air police services could be conducted with lower-cost light fighters. Opponents of the acquisition submitted more than 65,000 valid signatures to place the referendum on the ballot. The government will require that Swiss firms receive contracts amounting to 60% of the purchase price. Should the referendum pass, the government would be authorized to purchase the fighters with options being the Lockheed Martin F-35, the Boeing F/A-18E/F Super Hornet, the Dassault Rafale and the Eurofighter Typhoon.

=== Paternity leave referendum ===
A referendum to block a new paternity-leave law was supported by elements of the SVP. In 2019, the Parliament passed a law giving fathers two weeks of leave at 80% of gross income after the birth of a child. The leave will be paid by the Federal Social Insurance office and will be funded by contributions from both workers and employees at an estimated cost of 230 million CHF annually. Switzerland had been the only country in Western Europe without paternity leave. Susanne Brunner and Diana Gutjahr of the SVP advocated for the referendum and worked to collect the necessary 50,000 signatures to oppose what they consider to be additional interference in the labor market and a burden on employers from additional costs and taxes. The Social Democrats, Greens, the Christian Democratic Party, the Green Liberals and the Conservative Democratic Party all supported paternity leave; the national SVP opposed paternity leave, although some sections of the party supported it. FDP.The Liberals supported paternity leave in parliament but did not endorse a side in the referendum.

=== Results ===
Question	For			Against			Invalid/ blank	Total votes	Registered voters	Turnout	Outcome
Question	Votes	%	Cantons	Votes	%	Cantons	Invalid/ blank	Total votes	Registered voters	Turnout	Outcome
"For moderate immigration"	1,233,995	38.29	3 1/2	1,988,349	61.71	17 5/2	45,505	3,267,849	5,493,036	59.49	Rejected
Federal law on hunting amendment	1,531,027	48.07	–	1,654,105	51.93	–	74,686	3,259,818	5,493,036	59.34	Rejected
Federal law on federal direct tax amendment	1,164,451	36.76	–	2,003,235	63.24	–	84,620	3,252,306	5,493,036	59.21	Rejected
Paternity leave	1,933,310	60.34	–	1,270,705	39.66	–	56,598	3,260,613	5,493,036	59.36	Approved
Procuring new fighter aircraft	1,605,839	50.13	–	1,597,324	49.87	–	61,089	3,264,252	5,493,036	59.43	Approved
Source: Federal Chancellery

== November referendums ==
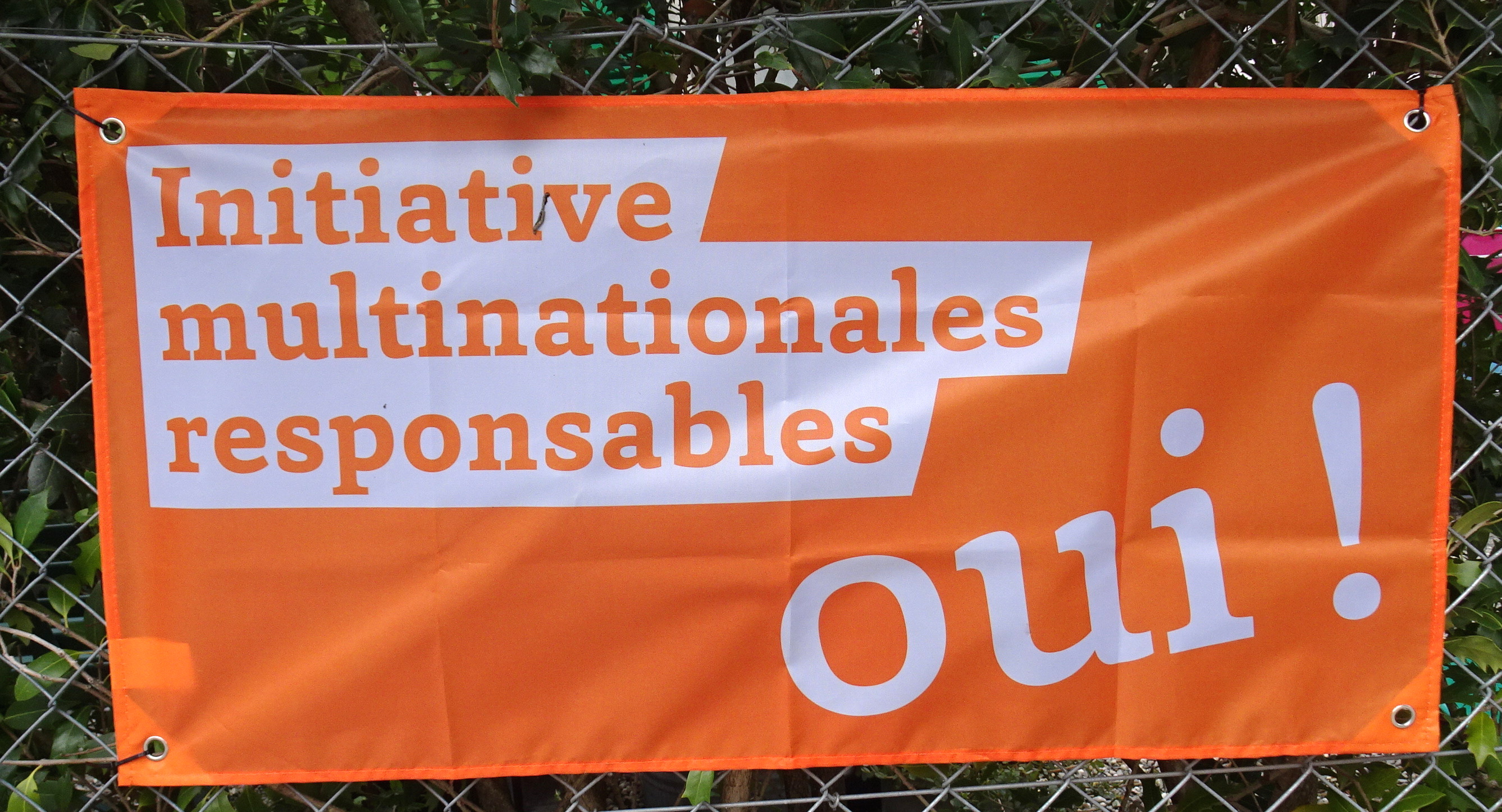
Banner (in French) supporting the responsible business initiative.

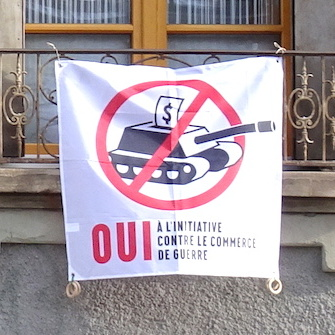
Flag of the initiative to limit financing of weapon production.

Two referendums were scheduled for 29 November, both of which were popular initiatives: "Responsible companies – to protect human beings and the environment" and "For a ban on financing producers of war material".

The "Responsible Companies" initiative failed despite receiving a majority of the popular vote due to its rejection by a majority of the cantons. The initiative to ban the funding of weapons makers also failed.

=== Results ===
Question	For			Against			Invalid/ blank	Total votes	Registered voters	Turnout	Outcome
Question	Votes	%	Cantons	Votes	%	Cantons	Invalid/ blank	Total votes	Registered voters	Turnout	Outcome
Responsible companies	1,299,129	50.73	8 1/2	1,261,680	49.27	12 5/2	24,031	2,584,840	5,495,345	47.04	Rejected
Ban on financing weapon production	1,081,684	42.55	3 1/2	1,460,650	57.45	17 5/2	37,620	2,579,954	5,495,345	46.95	Rejected
Source: Federal Chancellery
