= Organ (surname) =

Organ is a surname. Notable people with the surname include:

- Bryan Organ (born 1935), English painter
- Diana Organ (born 1952), British politician
- Ellen Organ (1903–1908), Irish child venerated by some Roman Catholics
- Felix Organ (born 1999), English cricketer
- Gerry Organ (born 1944), Canadian football player
- Lawrence P. Organ (born 1959), Canadian businessman
- Marjorie Organ (1886–1930), Irish-born American illustrator, cartoonist, caricaturist and model for her painter husband Robert Henri
- Michael Organ (born 1956), Australian politician
- Michael Organ (drummer) (born 1953), American drummer
- Stuart Organ (1951–2024), British actor
- Tommy Organ (born 1963), American musician
- Tyne-James Organ (born 1995), Australian alternative rock singer and songwriter
