= Moezzabad-e Gurgir =

Moezzabad-e Gurgir معزابادگورگير
- Village
- Location within Iran
- Coordinates: 29°34′55″N 53°16′12″E
- Country: Iran
- Province: Fars
- County: Kharameh
- Bakhsh: Central
- Rural District: Korbal

Population (2006)
  - Total: 1,230
- Time zone: UTC+3:30 (IRST)
  - Summer (DST): UTC+4:30 (IRDT)

Moezzabad-e Gurgir (Persian: معزابادگورگير, also Romanized as Mo‘ezzābād-e Gūrgīr; also known as Gūgīr and Gūrgīr) is a village in Korbal Rural District, in the Central District of Kharameh County, Fars province, Iran. At the 2006 census, its population was 1,230, in 311 families.
