= Kuhgir-e Sofla =

Village in Qazvin province, Iran

Kuhgir-e Sofla Persian: کوهگیر سفلی
- Village
- Location within Iran
- Coordinates: 36°34′10″N 49°31′38″E
- Country: Iran
- Province: Qazvin
- County: Qazvin
- District: Tarom-e Sofla
- Rural District: Kuhgir

Population (2016)
  - Total: 895
- Time zone: UTC+3:30 (IRST)

Kuhgir-e Sofla (Persian: کوهگیر سفلی) (Note: Also romanized as Kūhgīr-e Soflá; also known as G'ūgīr-e Soflá and Kūgīr-e Soflá) is a village in, and the capital of, Kuhgir Rural District in Tarom-e Sofla District of Qazvin County, Qazvin province, Iran. It was the capital of Niyarak Rural District until its capital was transferred to the village of Niyarak.

== Demographics ==
=== Population ===
At the time of the 2006 National Census, the village's population was 595 in 146 households. The following census in 2011 counted 467 people in 128 households. The 2016 census measured the population of the village as 895 people in 256 households. It was the most populous village in its rural district.
