= Sangan-e Sofla, Qazvin =

Village in Qazvin, Iran

Sangan-e Sofla سنگان سفلي
- Village
- Location within Iran
- Coordinates: 36°36′59″N 49°19′56″E
- Country: Iran
- Province: Qazvin
- County: Qazvin
- Bakhsh: Tarom Sofla
- Rural District: Khandan

Population (2006)
  - Total: 114
- Time zone: UTC+3:30 (IRST)
  - Summer (DST): UTC+4:30 (IRDT)

Sangan-e Sofla (Persian: سنگان سفلي, also Romanized as Sangān-e Soflá; also known as Sangān-e Pā’īn and Sangān) is a village in Khandan Rural District, Tarom Sofla District, Qazvin County, Qazvin Province, Iran. At the 2006 census, its population was 114, in 40 families.
