= Kuhgir-e Olya =

Village in Qazvin province, Iran

Kuhgir-e Olya Persian: كوهگير عليا
- Village
- Location within Iran
- Coordinates: 36°33′36″N 49°31′33″E
- Country: Iran
- Province: Qazvin
- County: Qazvin
- District: Tarom-e Sofla
- Rural District: Kuhgir

Population (2016)
  - Total: 225
- Time zone: UTC+3:30 (IRST)

Kuhgir-e Olya (Persian: كوهگير عليا) (Note: Also romanized as Kūhgīr-e ‘Olyā; also known as Gūgīr-e ‘Olyā, Kowgīr Larvand, Kūgīr-e ‘Olyā, Larvand, and Qeshlāq-e Larvand) is a village in Kuhgir Rural District of Tarom-e Sofla District in Qazvin County, Qazvin province, Iran.

== Demographics ==
=== Population ===
At the time of the 2006 National Census, the village's population was 154 in 46 households. The following census in 2011 counted 71 people in 26 households. The 2016 census measured the population of the village as 225 people in 68 households.
