= Qarkhun, East Azerbaijan =

Qarkhun قارخون
- Village
- Location within Iran
- Coordinates: 37°56′21″N 47°17′13″E
- Country: Iran
- Province: East Azerbaijan
- County: Sarab
- Bakhsh: Central
- Rural District: Abarghan

Population (2006)
  - Total: 185
- Time zone: UTC+3:30 (IRST)
  - Summer (DST): UTC+4:30 (IRDT)

Qarkhun (Persian: قارخون, also Romanized as Qārkhūn) is a village in Abarghan Rural District, in the Central District of Sarab County, East Azerbaijan Province, Iran. At the 2006 census, its population was 185, in 38 families.
