= 2020 Liechtenstein referendum =

- 30 August 2020
- Referendum on: Amending the constitution to promote equal representation of women in political bodies; Allowing dual citizenship for naturalised citizens; Funding a railway line expansion

HalbeHalbe (HalfHalf)
For	21.2%
Against	78.8%
Proposal rejected

Dual citizenship
For	38.5%
Against	61.5%
Proposal rejected

Rail expansion
For	37.7%
Against	62.3%
Proposal rejected
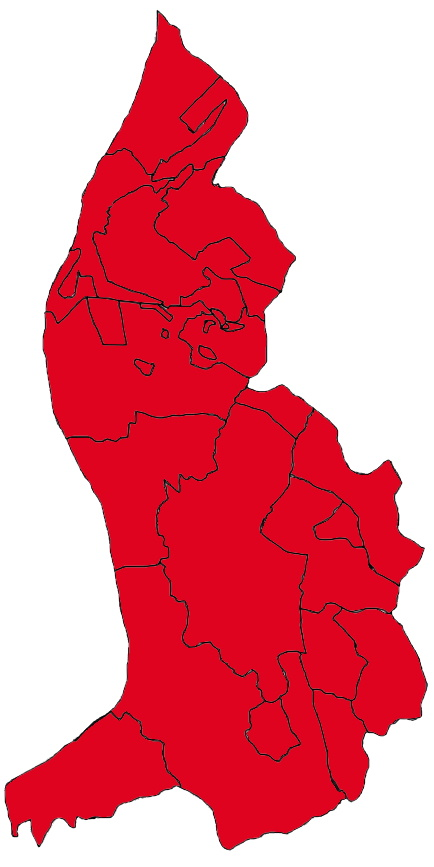
- Results by municipality (all three options)

A three-part referendum was held in Liechtenstein on 30 August 2020. Voters were asked whether they approve of an initiative proposing changes to the constitution to promote the equal representation of women in political bodies, a parliament law allowing dual citizenship for naturalised citizens, and a decision by the government to fund a railway line expansion. All three proposals were rejected.

== Background ==
The 'HalbeHalbe' (HalfHalf) popular initiative proposes inserting the text "The balanced representation of women and men in political bodies is promoted." to article 31, paragraph 2 of the constitution. The initiative was approved by the Landtag in November 2019, with organisers given six weeks to obtain the 1,500 signatures necessary for it to be discussed in the Landtag. Around 1,800 signatures were obtained, resulting in a debate in the Landtag on 4 March. A majority of members rejected the proposal, resulting in it proceeding to a referendum.

The dual citizenship proposal was put forward by the Free List in 2015, with the Landtag voting to require the government to amend legislation to allow dual citizenship for naturalised citizens by abolishing the requirement for them to give up their previous citizenship. The legislation was approved by the Landtag in March 2020, with members of parliament also voting to put the final decision to voters in a referendum.

A proposal to fund the S-Bahn Liechtenstein project - dual tracking of the Tisis–Nendeln railway track (which would allow the Swiss St. Gallen S-Bahn and Austrian Vorarlberg S-Bahn to merge into a regional network and increasing train frequency through Liechtenstein) was approved by the Landtag on 4 June 2020, with 18 members voting in favour. A majority of members also voted to put the final decision to voters in a referendum.

== Campaign ==
Party	HalbeHalbe	Dual citizenship	Rail expansion
Progressive Citizens' Party	Neutral (Note: Despite the party allowing its members to vote their conscience on the issue, the women's wing of the party supported the measure.)	Support	Support
Patriotic Union	Oppose	Support	Support
Free List	Support	Support	Support
The Independents	Oppose	Unknown	Oppose

== Results ==
All three proposals were rejected by a majority of voters. Turnout was slightly over 82%.

Question	For		Against		Invalid/ blank	Total votes	Registered voters	Turnout (%)	Result
Question	Votes	%	Votes	%	Invalid/ blank	Total votes	Registered voters	Turnout (%)	Result
HalbeHalbe	3,540	21.25	13,121	78.75	84	16,745	20,366	82.22	Rejected
Dual citizenship	6,419	38.48	10,262	61.52	89	16,770	20,366	82.34	Rejected
Rail expansion	6,272	37.66	10,383	62.34	128	16,783	20,366	82.41	Rejected
Source: Principality of Liechtenstein
