= 2020 Greek presidential election =

- 22 January 2020

300 members of the Hellenic Parliament 200 electoral votes needed to win
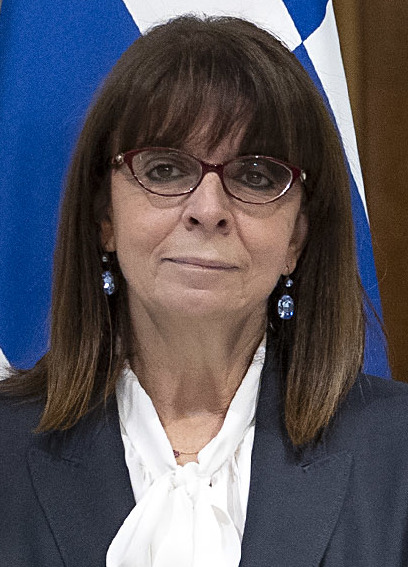
Nominee	Katerina Sakellaropoulou
Party	Independent
Electoral vote	261
Supported by	ND, Syriza & KINAL
President before election
Prokopis Pavlopoulos
New Democracy
President after election
Katerina Sakellaropoulou
Independent

An indirect presidential election were held in Greece on Wednesday 22 January 2020 for the President of the Hellenic Republic. Incumbent President Prokopis Pavlopoulos, who was elected by the Hellenic Parliament on 18 February 2015, was eligible for re-election but did not seek re-election.

Katerina Sakellaropoulou won the election with 261 votes. She was elected as the 13th and first female President of Greece.

== Date ==
The election procedure was held on Wednesday 22 January 2020.

== Constitutional provisions ==
According to Article 32 the Constitution of Greece, the head of state is elected for a five-year term by the Hellenic Parliament in a special session at least a month before the incumbent's term expires. The first and second rounds require a super majority of 200 out of the 300-strong body, dropping to 180 on the third.

In the event of a non-election even after the third ballot, the parliament is to be dissolved and a snap election to be called within ten days. After reconvening, the new parliament holds a maximum of three further rounds of voting, with the required majority at 180 votes in the fourth and a simple majority of 151 votes in the fifth round. A sixth and last round would be contested between the two candidates with the most votes and decided by a relative majority.

However, on 25 November 2019 after a constitutional amendment, the parliament decided the dissolution of snap elections when the president is not elected in the first 3 ballots. That means the Article 32, Paragraph 4 of the Greek Constitution which says about the election of the President has changed and the new reform of the paragraph is: If after 3 ballots (The first two with a required super majority of 200 out of the 300-strong body, dropping to 180 on the third), the president is not elected, the 4th ballot will be held with a required majority of 151 votes. The 5th and last ballot would be decided by a relative majority.

== Candidates ==
In afternoon of Wednesday 15 January 2020, Prime Minister Kyriakos Mitsotakis's government suggested Katerina Sakellaropoulou for the presidency, who had been President of the Council of State since 2018.

The next day, both SYRIZA and KINAL backed her candidacy. MeRA25 did not support Sakellaropoulou and suggested their own candidate, Magda Fissa. She is known as the mother of rapper Pavlos Fissas, who was murdered by supporters of the Golden Dawn in 2013. Later that night, Fissa stated that she had not been informed of the proposal by the Secretary-General of MeRA25, Yanis Varoufakis, and she later declined the offer, meaning that she would not be a candidate for the post.

== Procedure ==
New Democracy: 158; Syriza: 86; KINAL: 22; KKE: 15; EL: 10; MeRA25: 9

On the morning of Wednesday 22 January 2020, the parliament elected Katerina Sakellaropoulou as 13th President of Greece with 261 votes. 33 MPs voted "present" and 6 MPs were absent.

== Results ==
MPs from New Democracy, SYRIZA and KINAL voted in favor, while MPs from KKE, Greek Solution and MeRA25 voted present.

Candidate	Party	First round	
Candidate	Party	Votes	%
Katerina Sakellaropoulou	Independent	261	100
Valid votes		261	88.78
Abstentions		33	11.22
Voters		294	100
Absentees		6	2.00
Total		300	98.00
