= 2020 Northern Cypriot constitutional referendum =

11 October 2020

Results
Choice	Votes	%
Yes	53,711	49.87%
No	53,994	50.13%
Valid votes	107,705	92.88%
Invalid or blank votes	8,261	7.12%
Total votes	115,966	100.00%
Registered voters/turnout	198,957	58.29%

A constitutional referendum was held in Northern Cyprus on 11 October 2020 alongside the first round of presidential elections. The proposed amendment would increase membership of the Supreme Court from eight to a maximum of sixteen. The amendment was rejected by 50.13% of voters.

== Background ==
The 1983 constitution established a Supreme Court with eight members. In 2020 members of the court stated that its workload had doubled in the previous decade. A proposal was subsequently made in the Assembly of the Republic to amend the constitution to make the number of members of the court variable, with a minimum of eight and a maximum of sixteen. This was approved by a vote of 42–3 on 6 July. After approval of the amendments by the Assembly, the constitution required them to be approved in a referendum.

== Results ==
With a 58.29% turnout, the changes were narrowly rejected by less than 300 votes, with 49.87% of voters in favour of the changes and 50.13% opposed.

Choice	Votes	%
For	53,711	49.87
Against	53,994	50.13
Invalid/blank votes	8,261	–
Total	115,966	100
Registered voters/turnout	198,957	58.29
Source: Direct Democracy
