= Chuqur Rural District =

Rural district in Qazvin province, Iran

Chuqur Rural District Persian: دهستان چوقور
- Rural District
- Location within Iran
- Coordinates: 36°31′N 49°07′E
- Country: Iran
- Province: Qazvin
- County: Qazvin
- District: Tarom-e Sofla
- Established: 1987
- Capital: Hesar

Population (2016)
  - Total: 3,547
- Time zone: UTC+3:30 (IRST)

Chuqur Rural District (Persian: دهستان چوقور) is in Tarom-e Sofla District of Qazvin County, Qazvin province, Iran. Its capital is the village of Hesar.

== Demographics ==
=== Population ===
At the time of the 2006 National Census, the rural district's population was 2,308 in 541 households. There were 2,161 inhabitants in 728 households at the following census of 2011. The 2016 census measured the population of the rural district as 3,547 in 1,177 households. The most populous of its 21 villages was Hesar, with 440 people.

=== Other villages in the rural district ===
- Abbasabad
- Ardak
- Hoseynabad
- Mahin
- Razan
- Saznaq
- Zarand
