= 2020 Palauan constitutional referendum =

1 May 2020

Results
Choice	Votes	%
Yes	4,327	96.80%
No	143	3.20%
Valid votes	4,470	99.82%
Invalid or blank votes	8	0.18%
Total votes	4,478	100.00%
Registered voters/turnout	14,470	30.95%

A constitutional referendum was held in Palau on 1 May 2020. Voters were asked whether they approved of an amendment to article 1 of the constitution, which defined its maritime borders. The proposal was approved by 97% of voters.

== Amendments ==
The amendment proposed deleting part (b) of article 1, section 1, leaving the maritime border defined only by part (a). President Thomas Remengesau Jr. claimed this would strengthen the country's territorial claims and its negotiating position with other countries.

Article 1, section 1:

- ~~(a)~~The Republic of Palau shall have jurisdiction and sovereignty over its territory which consist of all the islands, atolls, reefs, and shoals that have traditionally been in the Palauan archipelago including Ngeruangel reef and Kayangel island in the north and Hatohobei Island (Tobi Island) and Hocharihie (Helen's reef) in the south and all land areas adjacent and in between, and also, consist of the internal waters and archipelagic waters within these land areas, the territorial waters around these land areas, and the air space above these lands and water areas, extending to a two hundred (200) nautical miles exclusive economic zone, unless otherwise delimited by bilateral agreement or as may be limited or extended under international law.
- ~~(b) the straight archipelagic baselines, from which the breadths of marine zones are measured for Palauan Archipelago, shall drawn from the northernmost point of Ngeruangel Reef, thence east to the northernmost point of Kayangel Island and around the island to its easternmost point, south to the easternmost point of the Babeldaob barrier reef, south to the easternmost point of Anguar Island and then around the island to its westernmost point, thence north to the westernmost point of Ngeruangel Reef and then around the reef to the point of origin. The normal baselines, from which the breaths of maritime zones for the Southwest islands are measured shall be drawn around the islands of Fanna, Sonsorol (Dongosaro), Pulo Anna and Merir, and the Island of Hatohobei (Tobi Island), including Hocharihic (Helen's Reef).~~

== Results ==
The change was approved by 97% of voters, with a majority in favour in all 16 states.

Choice	Votes	%
For	4,327	96.80
Against	143	3.20
Total	4,470	100.00
Valid votes	4,470	99.82
Invalid/blank votes	8	0.18
Total votes	4,478	100.00
Registered voters/turnout	14,470	30.95
Source: Direct Democracy
