= Niyarak Rural District =

Rural district in Qazvin province, Iran

Niyarak Rural District Persian: دهستان نیارک
- Rural District
- Location within Iran
- Coordinates: 36°32′N 49°23′E
- Country: Iran
- Province: Qazvin
- County: Qazvin
- District: Tarom-e Sofla
- Capital: Niyarak

Population (2016)
  - Total: 4,248
- Time zone: UTC+3:30 (IRST)

Niyarak Rural District (Persian: دهستان نیارک) is in Tarom-e Sofla District of Qazvin County, Qazvin province, Iran. Its capital is the village of Niyarak. The previous capital of the rural district was the village of Kuhgir-e Sofla.

== Demographics ==
=== Population ===
At the time of the 2006 National Census, the rural district's population was 1,874 in 527 households. There were 2,923 inhabitants in 917 households at the following census of 2011. The 2016 census measured the population of the rural district as 4,248 in 1,454 households. The most populous of its 22 villages was Niyarak, with 1,860 people.

=== Other villages in the rural district ===
- Gavanaj
- Khakineh-ye Bala
- Najafabad
- Vangin
- Zahabad
