= Khandan Rural District =

Rural district in Qazvin province, Iran

Khandan Rural District Persian: دهستان خندان
- Rural District
- Location within Iran
- Coordinates: 36°39′N 49°14′E
- Country: Iran
- Province: Qazvin
- County: Qazvin
- District: Tarom-e Sofla
- Established: 1987
- Capital: Siah Push

Population (2016)
  - Total: 12,013
- Time zone: UTC+3:30 (IRST)

Khandan Rural District (Persian: دهستان خندان) is in Tarom-e Sofla District of Qazvin County, Qazvin province, in northwest Iran. Its capital is the village of Siah Push.

== Demographics ==
=== Population ===
At the time of the 2006 National Census, the rural district's population was 7,892 in 2,161 households. There were 7,656 inhabitants in 2,820 households at the following census of 2011. The 2016 census measured the population of the rural district as 12,013 in 4,060 households. The most populous of its 48 villages was Orkan-e Kord, with 1,787 people.

=== Other villages in the rural district ===
- Altin Kosh
- Anbaqin
- Duljak Khan-e Mohammadabad
- Kallaj
- Mir Khavand-e Olya
- Mohammad Deh
- Morteza Nak
- Qushchi
- Shizar
