= Tarom-e Sofla District =

District in Qazvin province, Iran

Tarom-e Sofla District Persian: بخش طارم سفلی
- District
- Location within Iran
- Coordinates: 36°34′N 49°17′E
- Country: Iran
- Province: Qazvin
- County: Qazvin
- Capital: Sirdan

Population (2016)
  - Total: 25,160
- Time zone: UTC+3:30 (IRST)

Tarom-e Sofla District (Persian: بخش طارم سفلی) is in Qazvin County, Qazvin province, Iran. Its capital is the city of Sirdan.

== Demographics ==
=== Population ===
At the time of the 2006 National Census, the district's population was 15,409 in 4,145 households. The following census in 2011 counted 15,839 people in 5,483 households. The 2016 census measured the population of the district as 25,160 inhabitants in 8,376 households.

=== Administrative divisions ===
Tarom-e Sofla District Population
| Administrative Divisions | 2006 | 2011 | 2016 |
|---|---|---|---|
| Chuqur RD | 2,308 | 2,161 | 3,547 |
| Khandan RD | 7,892 | 7,856 | 12,013 |
| Kuhgir RD | 2,873 | 1,861 | 4,547 |
| Niyarak RD | 1,874 | 2,923 | 4,248 |
| Sirdan (city) | 462 | 1,038 | 805 |
| Total | 15,409 | 15,839 | 25,160 |
RD = Rural District
