= Sangan, Tehran =

Sangan سنگان
- Village
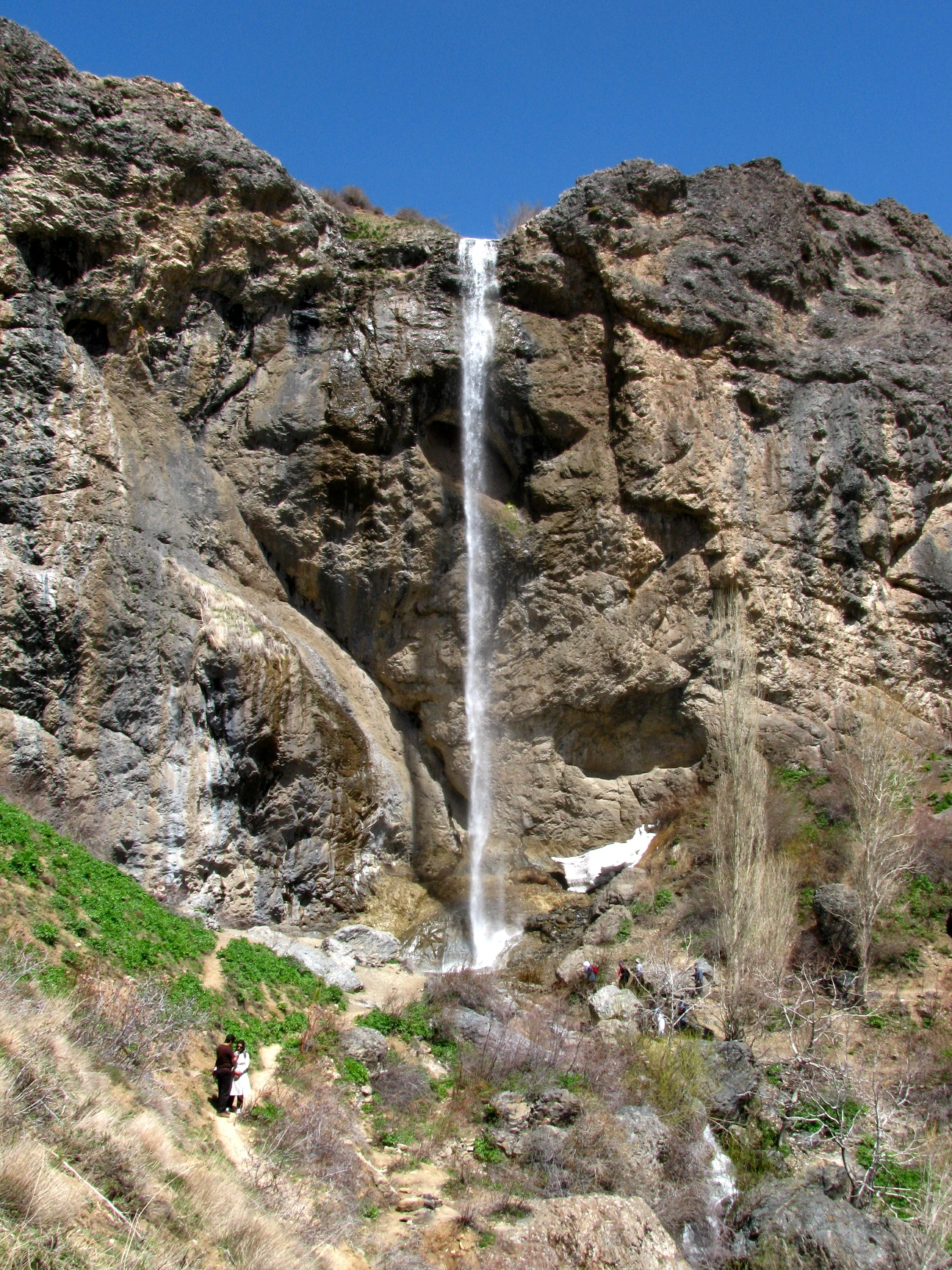
- Sangan Waterfall (nearby)

- Location within Iran
- Coordinates: 35°51′42″N 51°14′27″E
- Country: Iran
- Province: Tehran
- County: Tehran
- Bakhsh: Kan
- Rural District: Sulqan

Population (2011)
  - Total: 413
- Time zone: UTC+3:30 (IRST)

Sangan (Persian: سنگان, also Romanized as Sangān and Sankān; also known as Sangān-e Pā’īn) is a village in Sulqan Rural District, Kan District, Tehran County, Tehran Province, Iran. The village lies inside the Alborz mountains in the valley of Sangan river.

In 2011, its population was 413 residents in 127 households. It was divided into 4 villages at the 2016 census:

- Sangan-e Bala with a population of 481 people in 156 households.
- Sangan-e Vasat with a population of 377 people in 129 households.
- Sangan-e Pain with a population of 509 people in 179 households.
- Bagh Darreh-ye Sangan with a population of 218 people in 64 households.

Sangan Waterfall is located nearby.
