= Shahran, Tehran =

Neighbourhood in Tehran, Iran

Shahran
- Neighborhood of Tehran
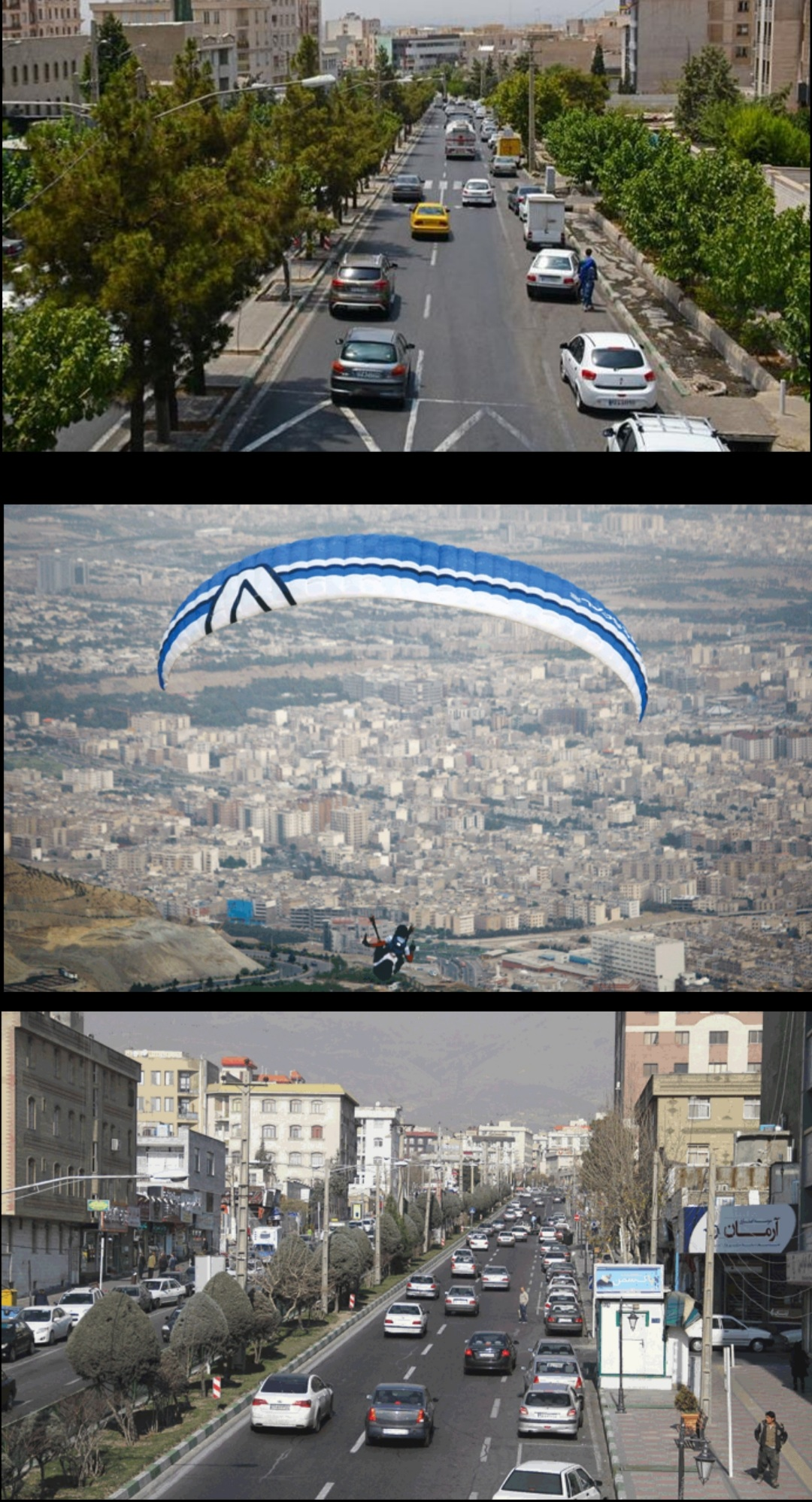
- Interactive map of Shahran
- Country: Iran
- Province: Tehran province
- City: Tehran
- Area code: (+98) 021

Shahran (Persian: شهران) is a neighbourhood in north-west Tehran, Iran.

== Location ==
Shahran is located at the beginning of a road toward Sulqan and Sangan; two villages. The road also connects Tehran to Imamzadeh Davood; a village with a shrine. Shahran is located in the east of the Kan District; a large village now is a part of Tehran City and still is also an independent district of Tehran governorship.

== Economy ==
=== Fashion and clothing ===
Fashion and clothing have been one of the most important sectors of the neighborhood economy since 2000, with a number of Tehrani models working in the neighborhood. A number of categories of women's clothing such as women's boots, leggings, scarves, and coats are known for selling in the neighborhood stores.

=== Tourism ===
Koohsar Shahran Park is a forest park located in Shahran. It covers an area of about 10 square kilometers, and includes ramps and facilities for cycling and skating. It has 2 main entrances, One on Koohsar Boulevard and another on Shahran Boulevard, and is Tehran's largest forest park. Due to the clean air, many people in Tehran come to Koohsar Shahran Park for walking and sport activities.

== Gallery ==
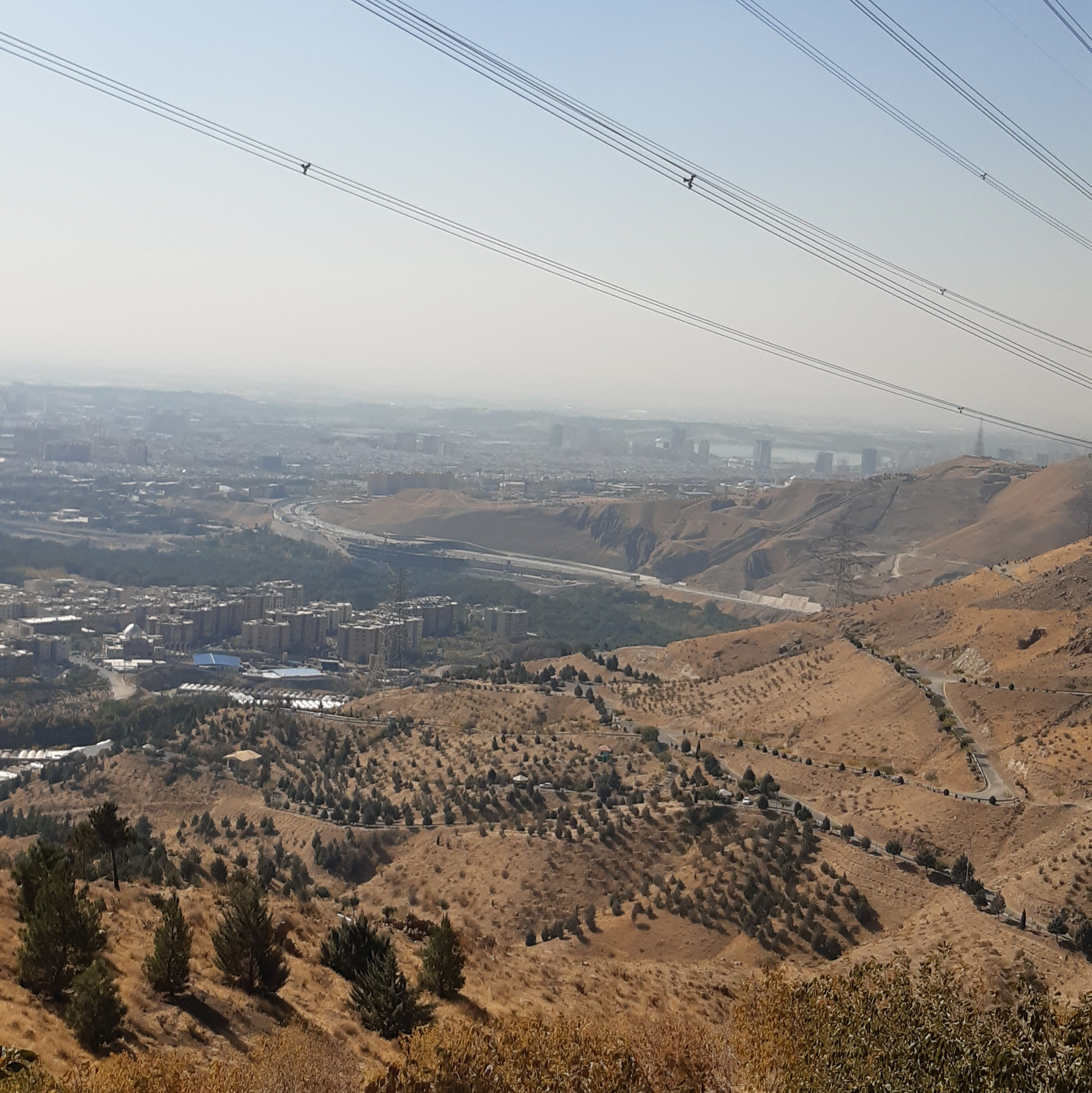
View from Koohsar Park

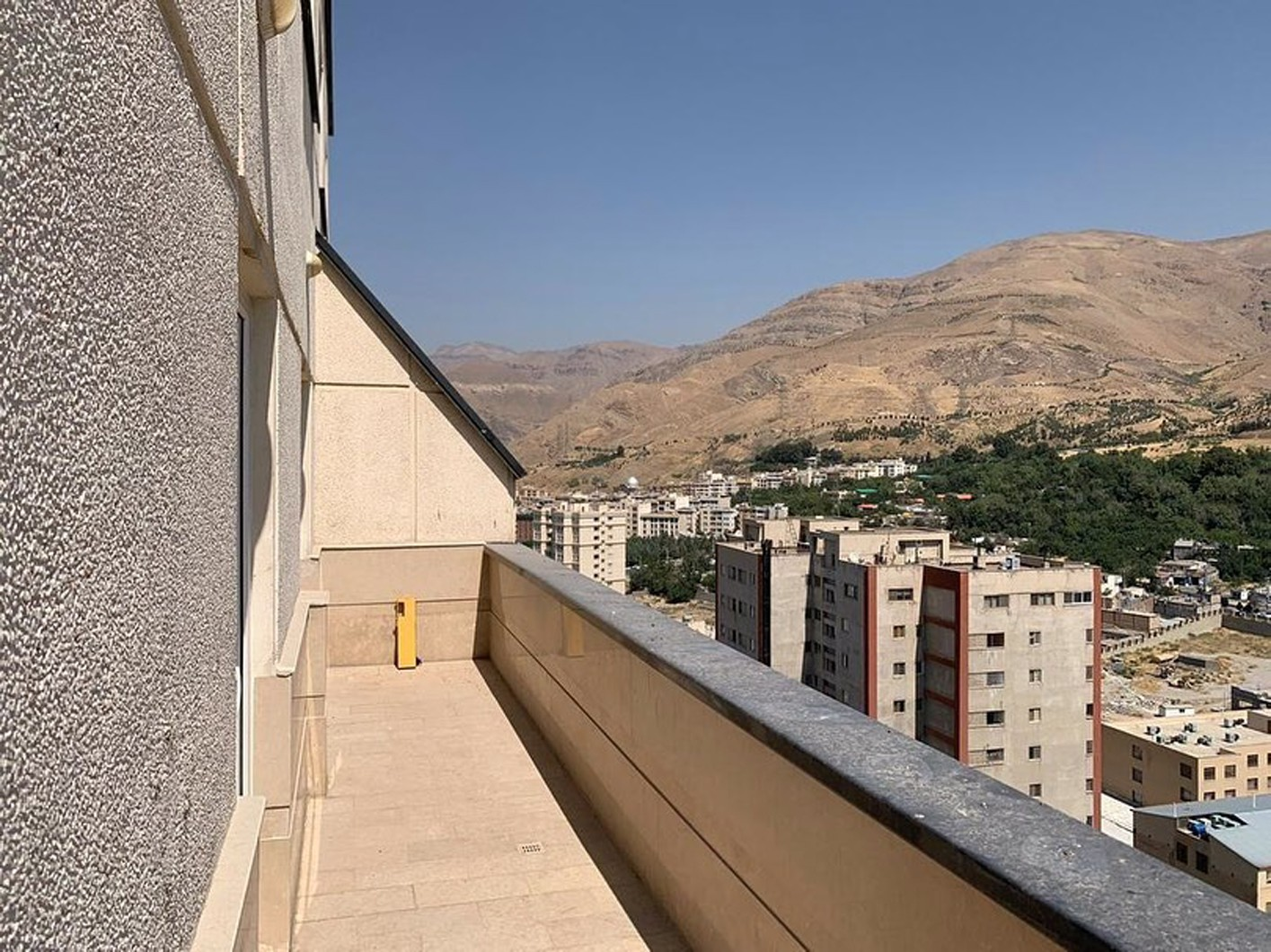
View from Koohsar St.

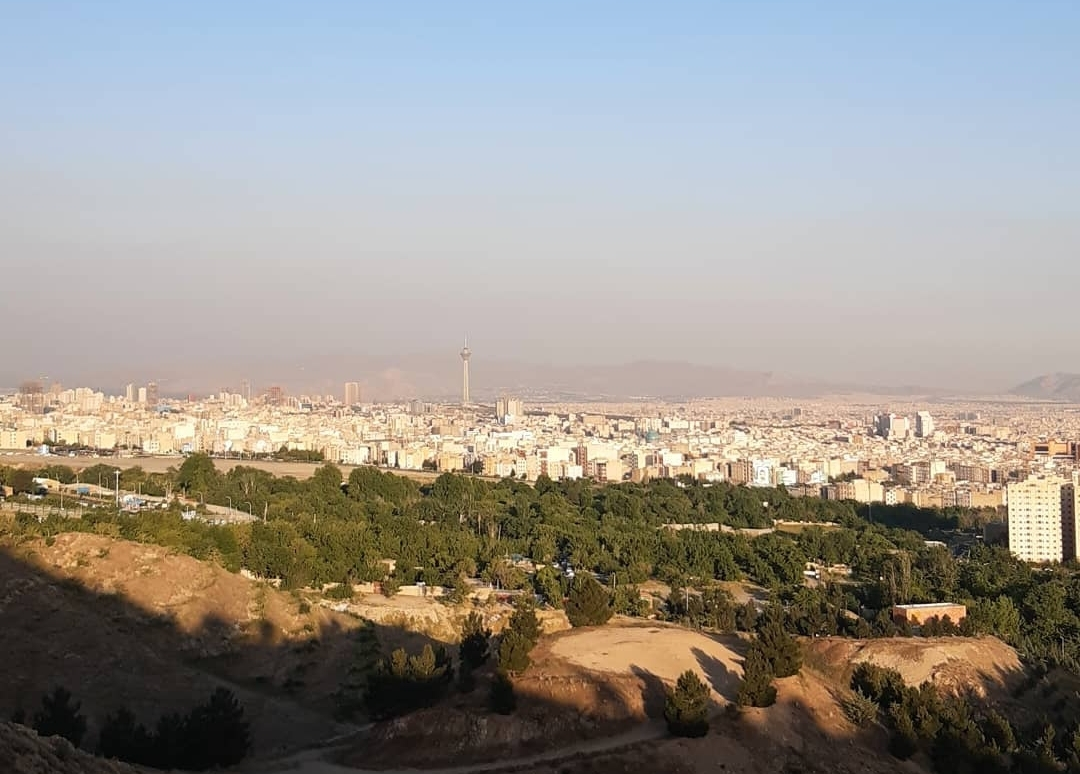
View from Koohsar Park
