= Dinarabad, Tehran =

Village in Tehran province, Iran

Dinarabad Persian: ديناراباد
- Village
- Location within Iran
- Country: Iran
- Province: Tehran
- County: Tehran
- District: Aftab
- Rural District: Khalazir

Population (2016)
  - Total: 0
- Time zone: UTC+3:30 (IRST)

Dinarabad (Persian: ديناراباد) (Note: Also romanized as Dīnārābād) is a village in Khalazir Rural District of Aftab District in Tehran County, Tehran province, Iran.

== Demographics ==
=== Population ===
At the time of the 2006 National Census, the village's population was 116 in 28 households. The following census in 2011 counted 102 people in 23 households. The 2016 census measured the population of the village as zero.
