= Valiabad, Tehran =

Village in Tehran province, Iran

Valiabad Persian: ولي اباد
- Village
- Location within Iran
- Country: Iran
- Province: Tehran
- County: Tehran
- District: Aftab
- Rural District: Khalazir

Population (2016)
  - Total: Below reporting threshold
- Time zone: UTC+3:30 (IRST)

Valiabad (Persian: ولي اباد) (Note: Also romanized as Valīābād) is a village in Khalazir Rural District of Aftab District in Tehran County, Tehran province, Iran.

== Demographics ==
=== Population ===
At the time of the 2006 National Census, the village's population was 31 in nine households. The following census in 2011 counted 32 people in seven households. The 2016 census measured the population of the village as below the reporting threshold.
