= Hasanabad-e Baqeraf =

Village in Tehran province, Iran

Hasanabad-e Baqeraf Persian: حسن‌آباد باقراف
- Village
- Location within Iran
- Coordinates: 35°35′30″N 51°22′57″E
- Country: Iran
- Province: Tehran
- County: Tehran
- District: Aftab
- Rural District: Aftab

Population (2016)
  - Total: 707
- Time zone: UTC+3:30 (IRST)

Hasanabad-e Baqeraf (Persian: حسن‌آباد باقراف) (Note: Also romanized as Ḩasanābād-e Bāqerāf; also known as Dehkadeh-ye Towḩīd, Hāsanābād-e Bāqer Of, Ḩasanābād-e Bāqerof, and Towḩīd) is a village in Aftab Rural District of Aftab District in Tehran County, Tehran province, Iran.

== Demographics ==
=== Population ===
At the time of the 2006 National Census, the village's population was 531 in 134 households. The following census in 2011 counted 593 people in 152 households. The 2016 census measured the population of the village as 707 people in 194 households.
