= Jafarabad-e Jangal, Tehran =

Village in Tehran province, Iran

Jafarabad-e Jangal Persian: جعفرابادجنگل
- Village
- Location within Iran
- Coordinates: 35°33′42″N 51°19′01″E
- Country: Iran
- Province: Tehran
- County: Tehran
- District: Aftab
- Rural District: Khalazir

Population (2016)
  - Total: 515
- Time zone: UTC+3:30 (IRST)

Jafarabad-e Jangal (Persian: جعفرابادجنگل) (Note: Also romanized as Ja‘farābād-e Jangal; also known as Ja‘farābād) is a village in Khalazir Rural District of Aftab District in Tehran County, Tehran province, Iran.

== Demographics ==
=== Population ===
At the time of the 2006 National Census, the village's population was 386 in 98 households. The following census in 2011 counted 481 people in 132 households. The 2016 census measured the population of the village as 515 people in 171 households.
