= Rashidabad, Tehran =

Village in Tehran province, Iran

Rashidabad Persian: رشيداباد
- Village
- Location within Iran
- Country: Iran
- Province: Tehran
- County: Tehran
- District: Aftab
- Rural District: Aftab

Population (2016)
  - Total: 20
- Time zone: UTC+3:30 (IRST)

Rashidabad (Persian: رشيداباد) (Note: Also romanized as Rashīdābād) is a village in Aftab Rural District of Aftab District in Tehran County, Tehran province, Iran.

== Demographics ==
=== Population ===
At the time of the 2006 National Census, the village's population was 60 in 14 households. The following census in 2011 counted 51 people in 12 households. The 2016 census measured the population of the village as 20 people in six households.
