= Karimabad, Tehran =

Village in Tehran province, Iran

Karimabad Persian: كريم آباد
- Village
- Location within Iran
- Coordinates: 35°36′23″N 51°23′06″E
- Country: Iran
- Province: Tehran
- County: Tehran
- District: Aftab
- Rural District: Aftab

Population (2016)
  - Total: 0
- Time zone: UTC+3:30 (IRST)

Karimabad (Persian: كريم آباد) (Note: Also romanized as Karīmābād) is a village in Aftab Rural District of Aftab District in Tehran County, Tehran province, Iran.

== Demographics ==
=== Population ===
At the time of the 2006 National Census, the village's population was 64 in 18 households. The following census in 2011 counted 52 people in 15 households. The 2016 census measured the population of the village as zero.
