= Palain =

Village in Tehran province, Iran

Palain Persian: پلايين
- Village
- Location within Iran
- Coordinates: 35°35′07″N 51°21′25″E
- Country: Iran
- Province: Tehran
- County: Tehran
- District: Aftab
- Rural District: Khalazir

Population (2016)
  - Total: 238
- Time zone: UTC+3:30 (IRST)

Palain (Persian: پلايين) (Note: Also romanized as Palā’īn) is a village in Khalazir Rural District of Aftab District in Tehran County, Tehran province, Iran.

== Demographics ==
=== Population ===
At the time of the 2006 National Census, the village's population was 361 in 81 households. The following census in 2011 counted 259 people in 66 households. The 2016 census measured the population of the village as 238 people in 62 households.
