= Shokrabad, Tehran =

Village in Tehran province, Iran

Shokrabad Persian: شكراباد
- Village
- Location within Iran
- Coordinates: 35°31′58″N 51°19′50″E
- Country: Iran
- Province: Tehran
- County: Tehran
- District: Aftab
- Rural District: Khalazir

Population (2016)
  - Total: 447
- Time zone: UTC+3:30 (IRST)

Shokrabad (Persian: شكراباد) (Note: Also romanized as Shokrābād; also known as Lashkarābād) is a village in Khalazir Rural District of Aftab District in Tehran County, Tehran province, Iran.

== Demographics ==
=== Population ===
At the time of the 2006 National Census, the village's population was 305 in 73 households. The following census in 2011 counted 345 people in 91 households. The 2016 census measured the population of the village as 447 people in 98 households.
