= Vardij =

Village in Tehran province, Iran

Vardij Persian: ورديج
- Village
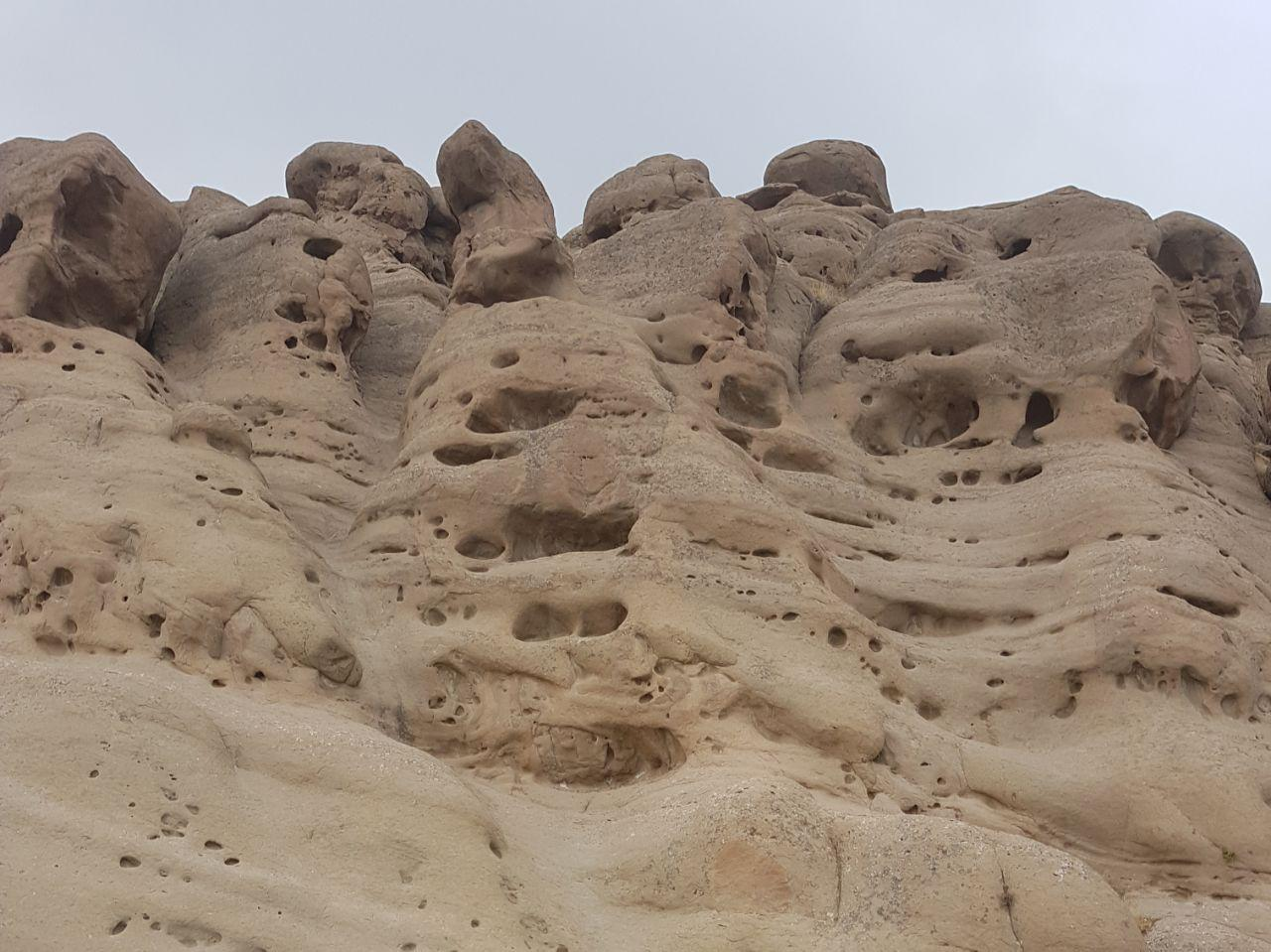
- "Ghost stones" of Vardij

- Location within Iran
- Coordinates: 35°48′43″N 51°10′34″E
- Country: Iran
- Province: Tehran
- County: Tehran
- District: Kan
- Rural District: Sulqan
- Elevation: 1,850 m (6,070 ft)

Population (2016)
  - Total: 778
- Time zone: UTC+3:30 (IRST)

Vardij (Persian: ورديج) (Note: Also romanized as Vardīj; also known as Wārdi) is a village in Sulqan Rural District of Kan District in Tehran County, Tehran province, Iran.

Vardij is popular for its "stone giants." The stones of the mountains have the appearance of giant human heads.

== Demographics ==
=== Population ===
At the time of the 2006 National Census, the village's population was 281 in 77 households. The following census in 2011 counted 461 people in 144 households. The 2016 census measured the population of the village as 778 people in 271 households. It was the most populous village in its rural district.
