= Kashanak =

Kashanak or Keshanak (Persian: كاشانك) may refer to:

- Kashanak, Isfahan
- Kashanak, North Khorasan
- Kashanak, Tehran
