= Marjanabad, Tehran =

Village in Tehran province, Iran

Marjanabad Persian: مرجان اباد
- Village
- Location within Iran
- Coordinates: 35°32′06″N 51°18′23″E
- Country: Iran
- Province: Tehran
- County: Tehran
- District: Aftab
- Rural District: Khalazir

Population (2016)
  - Total: 292
- Time zone: UTC+3:30 (IRST)

Marjanabad (Persian: مرجان اباد) (Note: Also romanized as Marjānābād) is a village in Khalazir Rural District of Aftab District in Tehran County, Tehran province, Iran.

== Demographics ==
=== Population ===
At the time of the 2006 National Census, the village's population was 292 in 74 households. The following census in 2011 counted 247 people in 68 households. The 2016 census measured the population of the village as 292 people in 92 households.
