= Salehabad-e Seyyedabad =

Village in Tehran province, Iran

Salehabad-e Seyyedabad Persian: صالح ابادصيداباد
- Village
- Location within Iran
- Coordinates: 35°36′31″N 51°23′17″E
- Country: Iran
- Province: Tehran
- County: Tehran
- District: Aftab
- Rural District: Aftab

Population (2016)
  - Total: 1,646
- Time zone: UTC+3:30 (IRST)

Salehabad-e Seyyedabad (Persian: صالح ابادصيداباد) (Note: Also romanized as Sāleḥābād-e Seyyedābād) is a village in Aftab Rural District of Aftab District in Tehran County, Tehran province, Iran.

== Demographics ==
=== Population ===
At the time of the 2006 National Census, the village's population was 2,420 in 564 households. The following census in 2011 counted 2,523 people in 696 households. The 2016 census measured the population of the village as 1,646 people in 463 households.
