= Aftabeh (disambiguation) =

An aftabeh is a pitcher used for washing.

Aftabeh may also refer to:

- Aftabeh, Ardabil, a village in Iran
- Aftabeh, West Azerbaijan or Haftabad, a village in Iran

== See also ==
- Aftab (disambiguation)
