= Moradabad, Tehran =

Village in Tehran province, Iran

Moradabad Persian: مراداباد
- Village
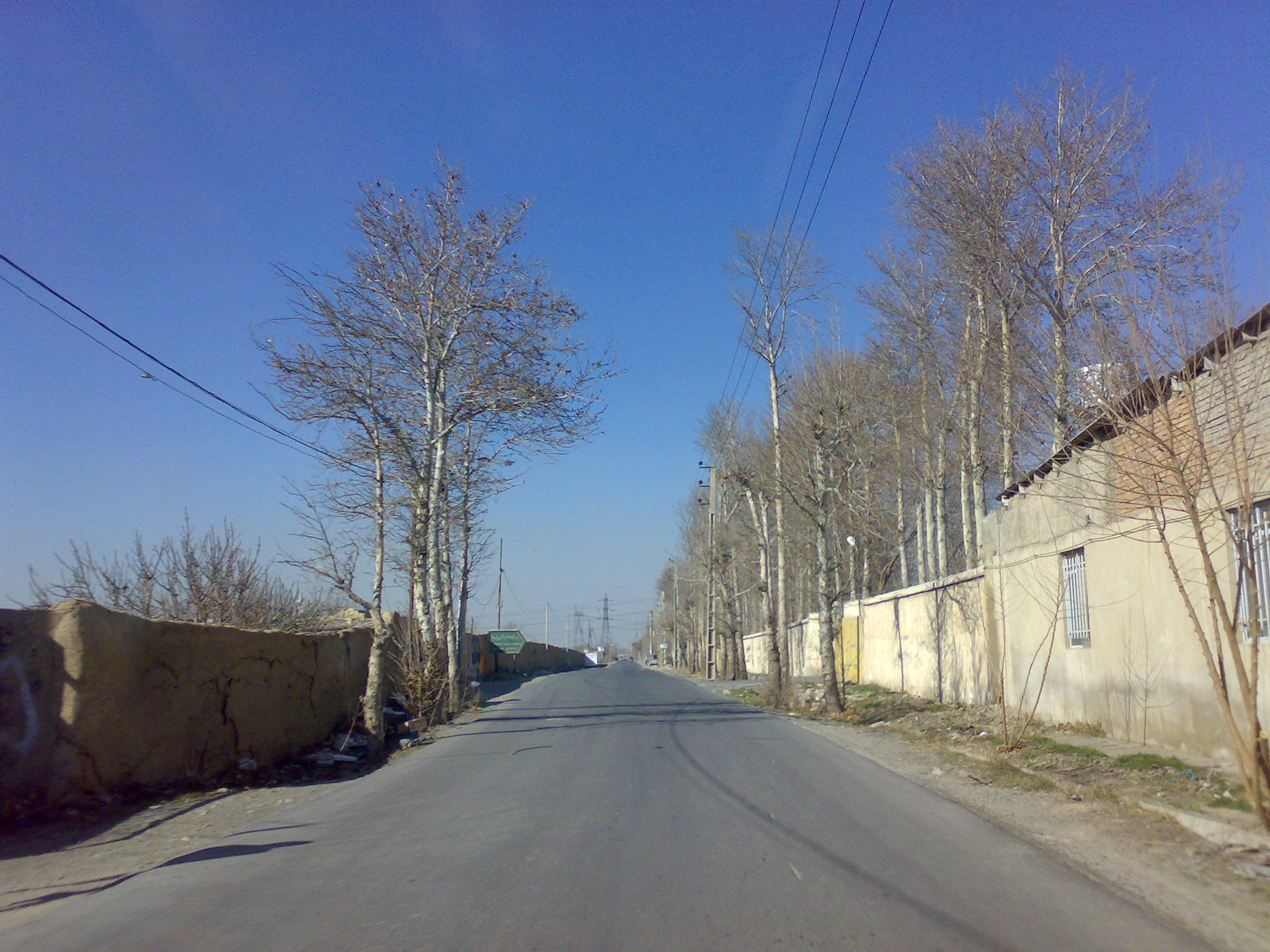

- Location within Iran
- Coordinates: 35°34′33″N 51°19′48″E
- Country: Iran
- Province: Tehran
- County: Tehran
- District: Aftab
- Rural District: Khalazir

Population (2016)
  - Total: Below reporting threshold
- Time zone: UTC+3:30 (IRST)

Moradabad (Persian: مراداباد) (Note: Also romanized as Morādābād) is a village in Khalazir Rural District of Aftab District in Tehran County, Tehran province, Iran.

== Demographics ==
=== Population ===
At the time of the 2006 National Census, the village's population was 29 in eight households. The following census in 2011 counted 52 people in 17 households. The 2016 census measured the population of the village as below the reporting threshold.
