= Emamzadeh Davud, Tehran =

Village in Tehran province, Iran

Emamzadeh Davud Persian: امام زاده داود
- Village
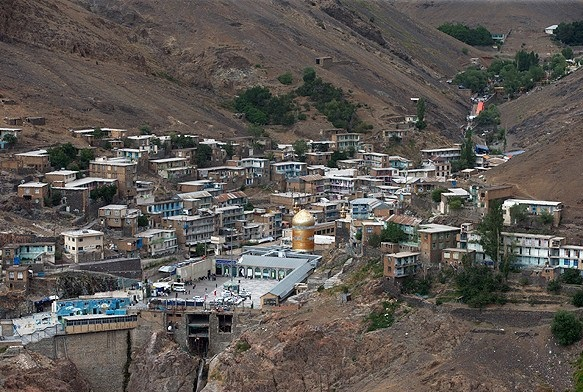
- The village of Emamzadeh Davud

- Location within Iran
- Coordinates: 35°52′39″N 51°20′19″E
- Country: Iran
- Province: Tehran
- County: Tehran
- District: Kan
- Rural District: Sulqan
- Elevation: 2,550–2,620 m (8,370–8,600 ft)

Population (2016)
  - Total: 468
- Time zone: UTC+3:30 (IRST)

Emamzadeh Davud (Persian: امام زاده داود) (Note: Also romanized as Emāmzādeh Dāvūd; also known as Emāmzādeh Dāvod and Keykāv-e Emāmzādeh Dāvūd) is a village in Sulqan Rural District of Kan District in Tehran County, Tehran province, Iran.

== Demographics ==
=== Population ===
At the time of the 2006 National Census, the village's population was 179 in 50 households. The following census in 2011 counted 210 people in 67 households. The 2016 census measured the population of the village as 468 people in 142 households.

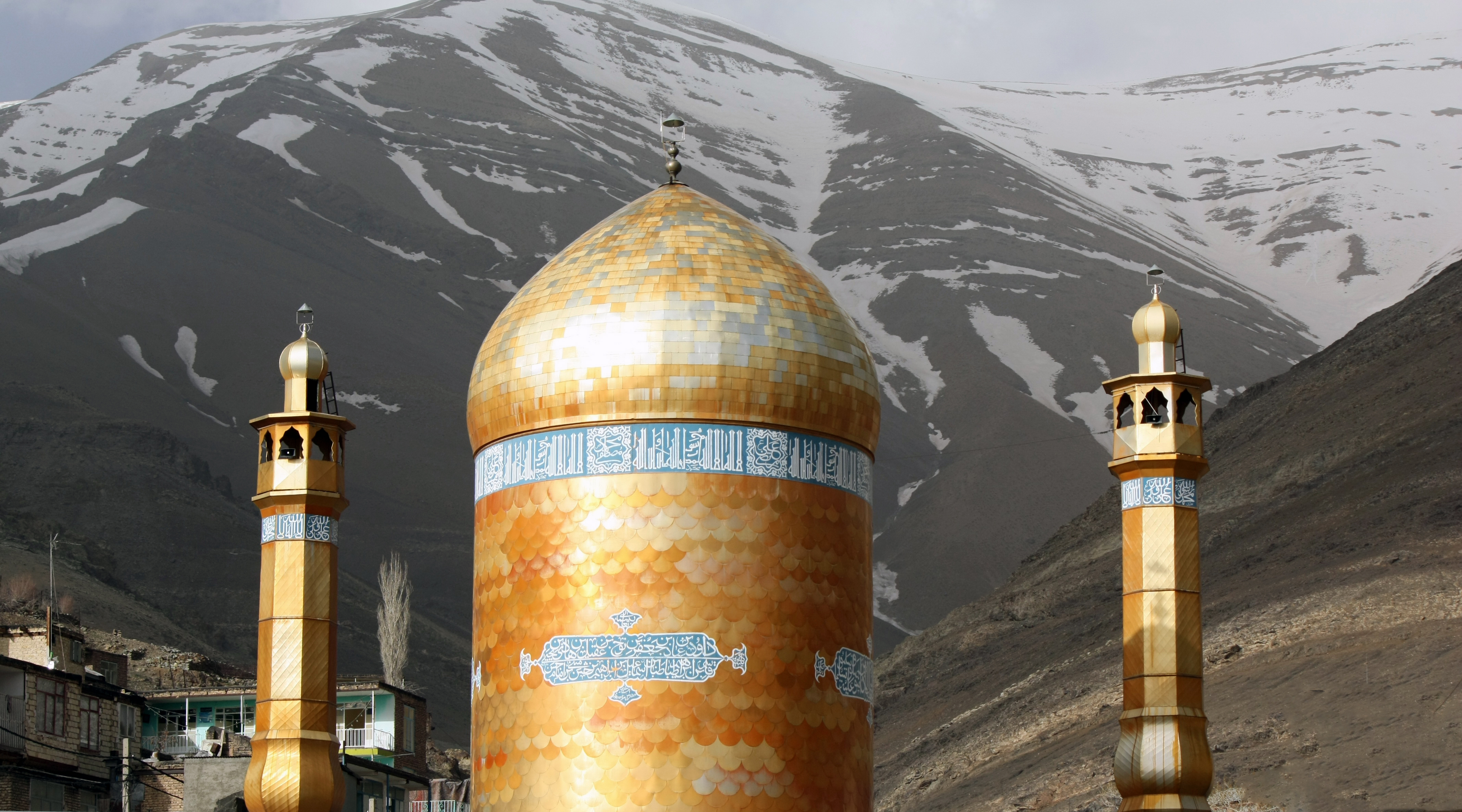
Emamzadeh Davud

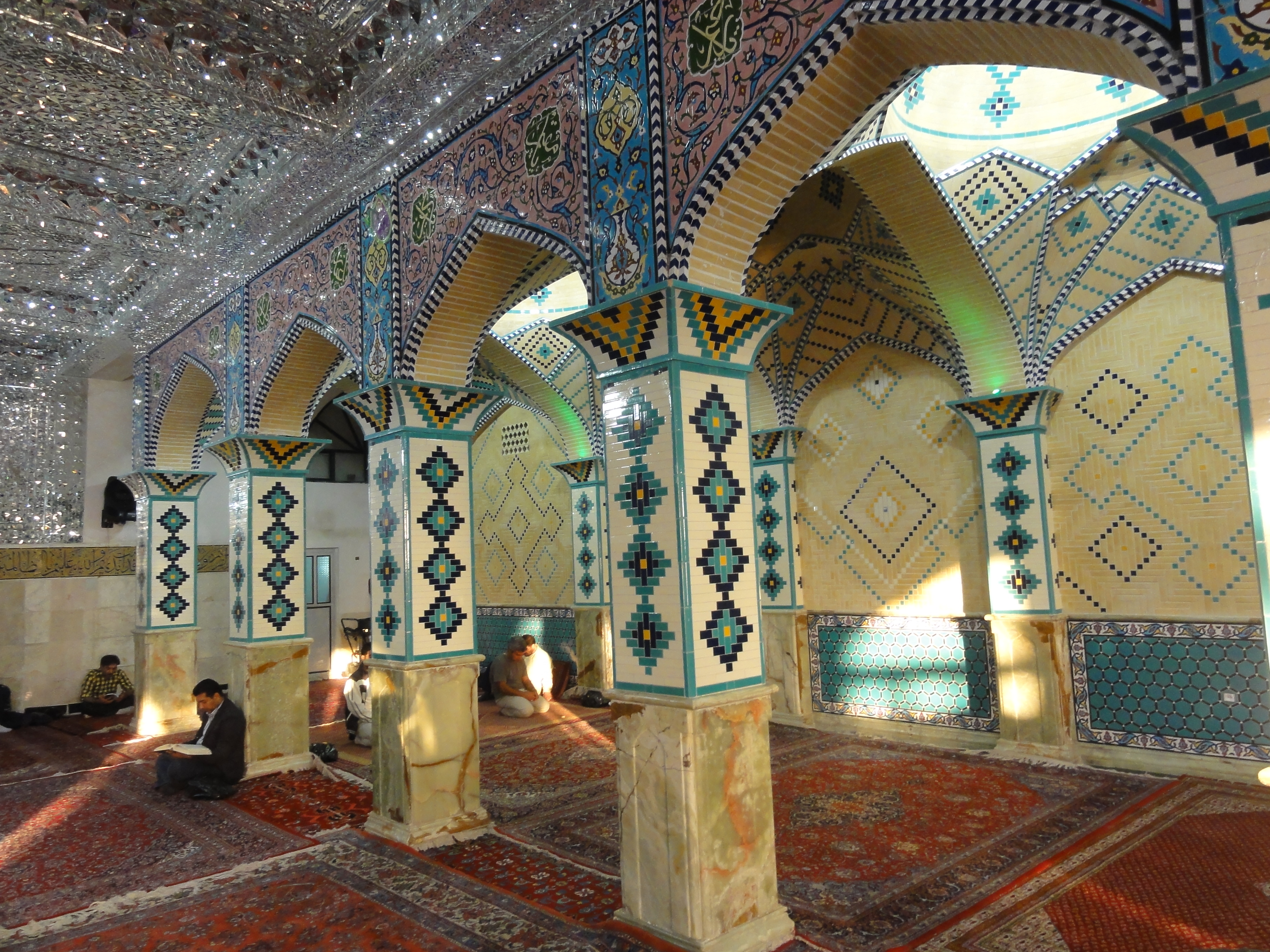
Emamzadeh Davud Shrine

== Gallery ==
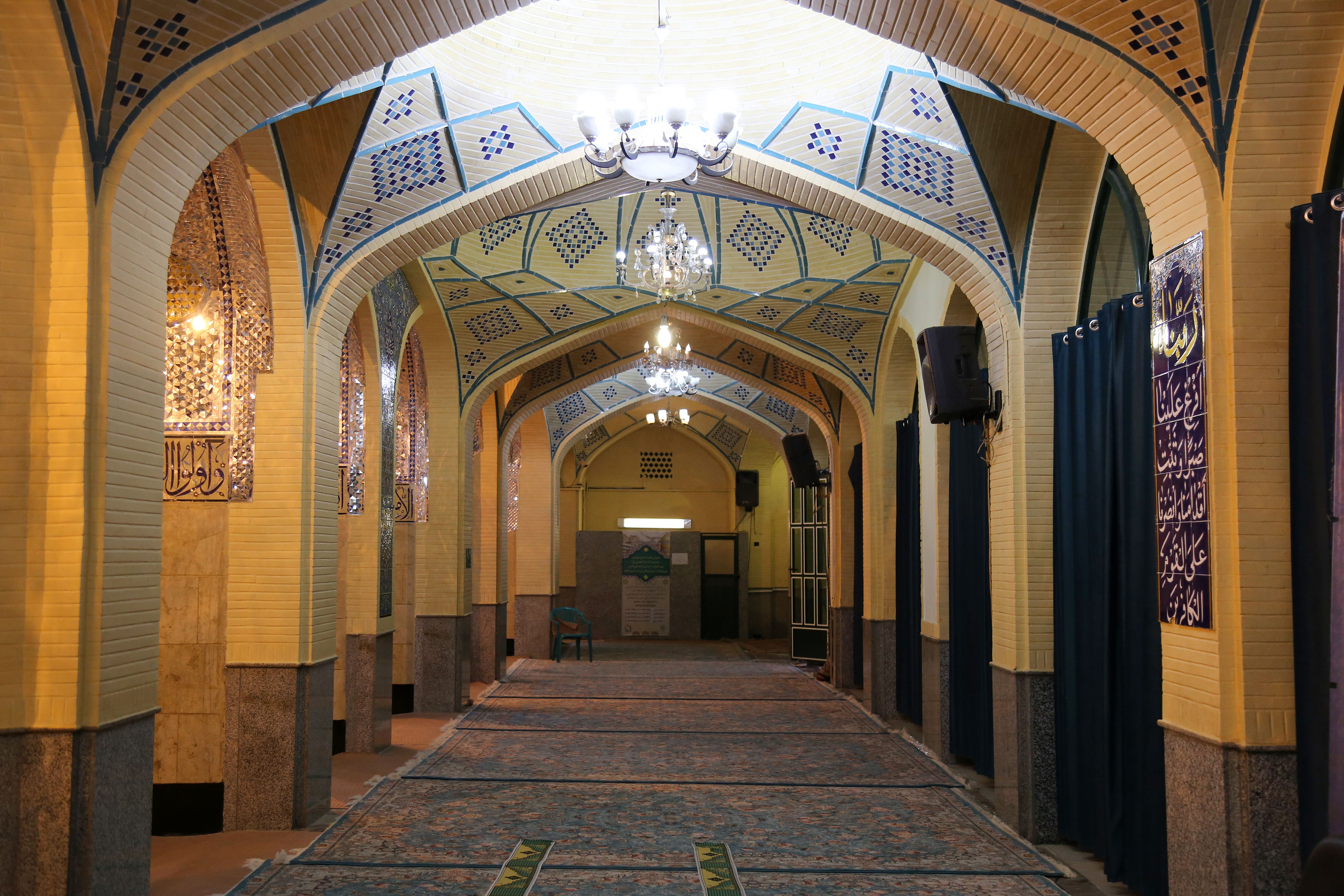
Emamzadeh Shrine, Kan District, Tehran County

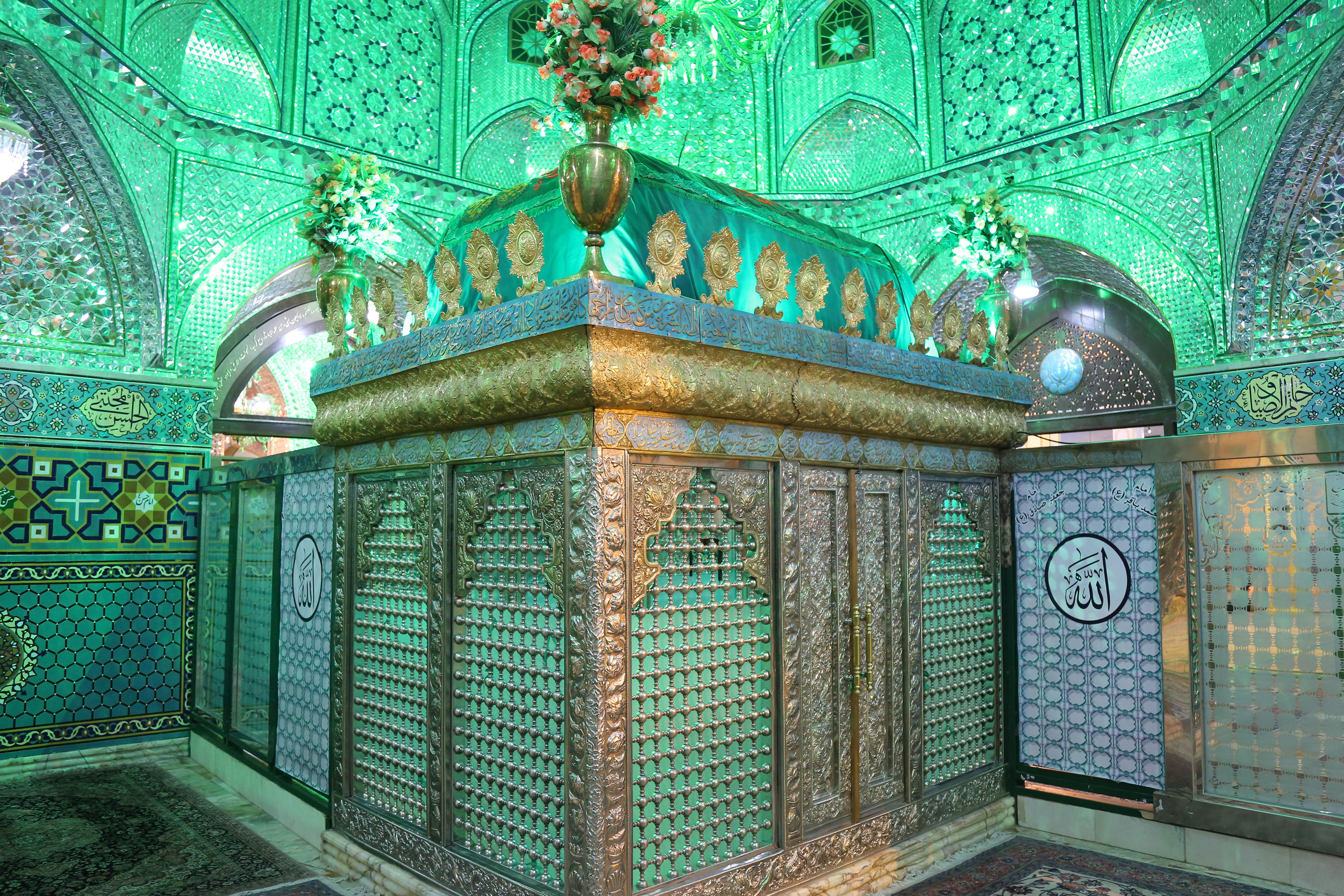
Emamzadeh Shrine, Kan District, Tehran County

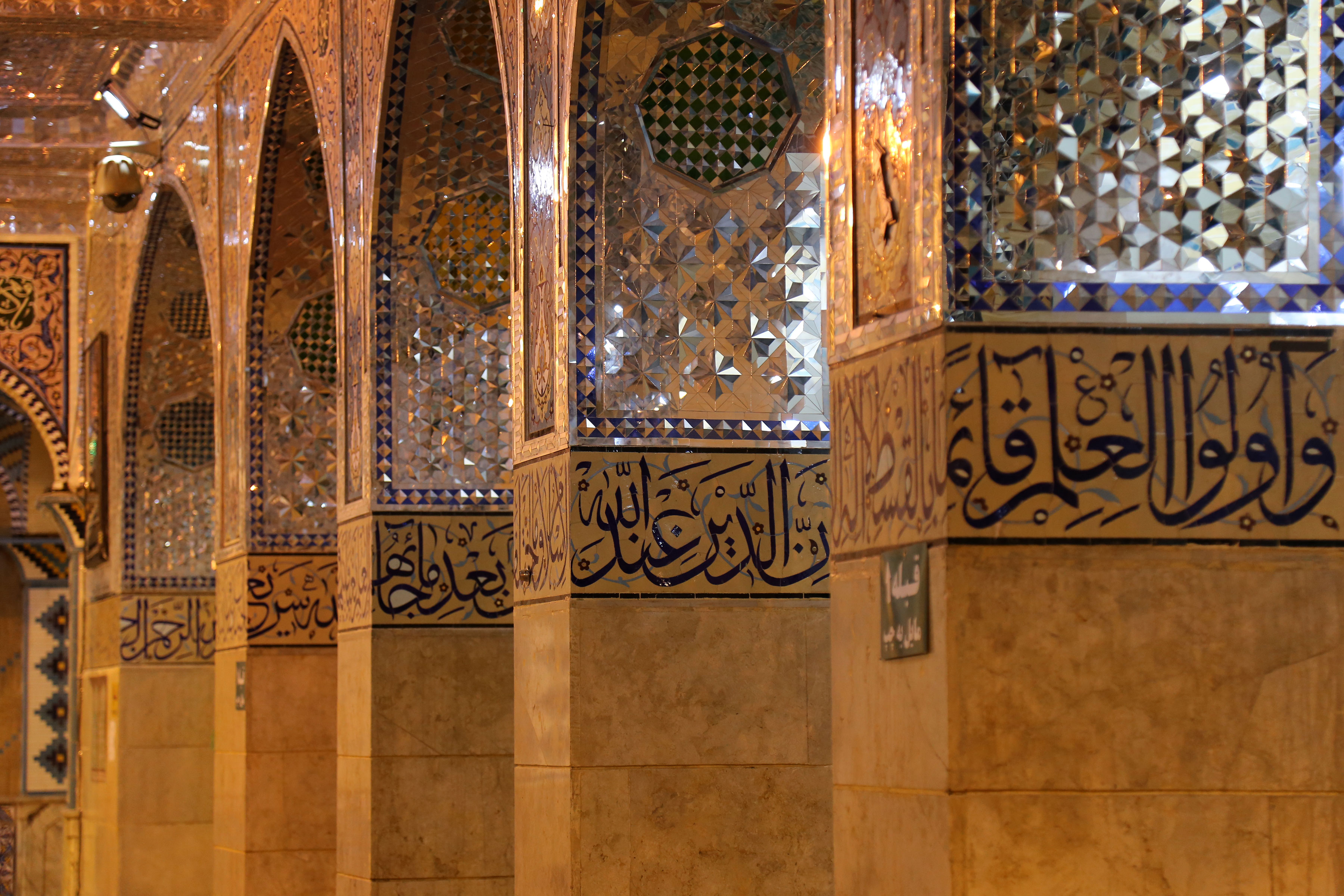
Emamzadeh Shrine, Kan District, Tehran County

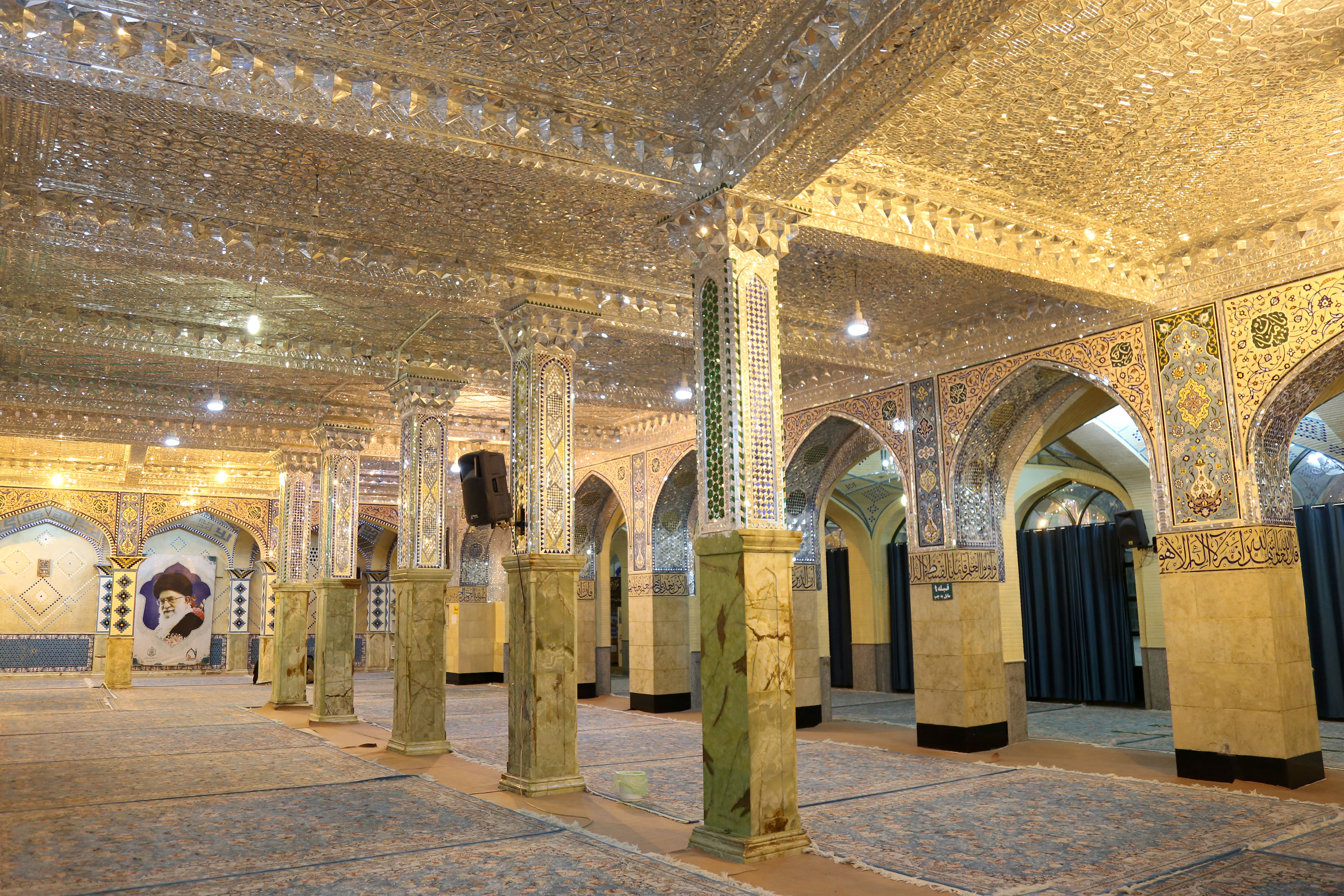
Emamzadeh Shrine, Kan District, Tehran County

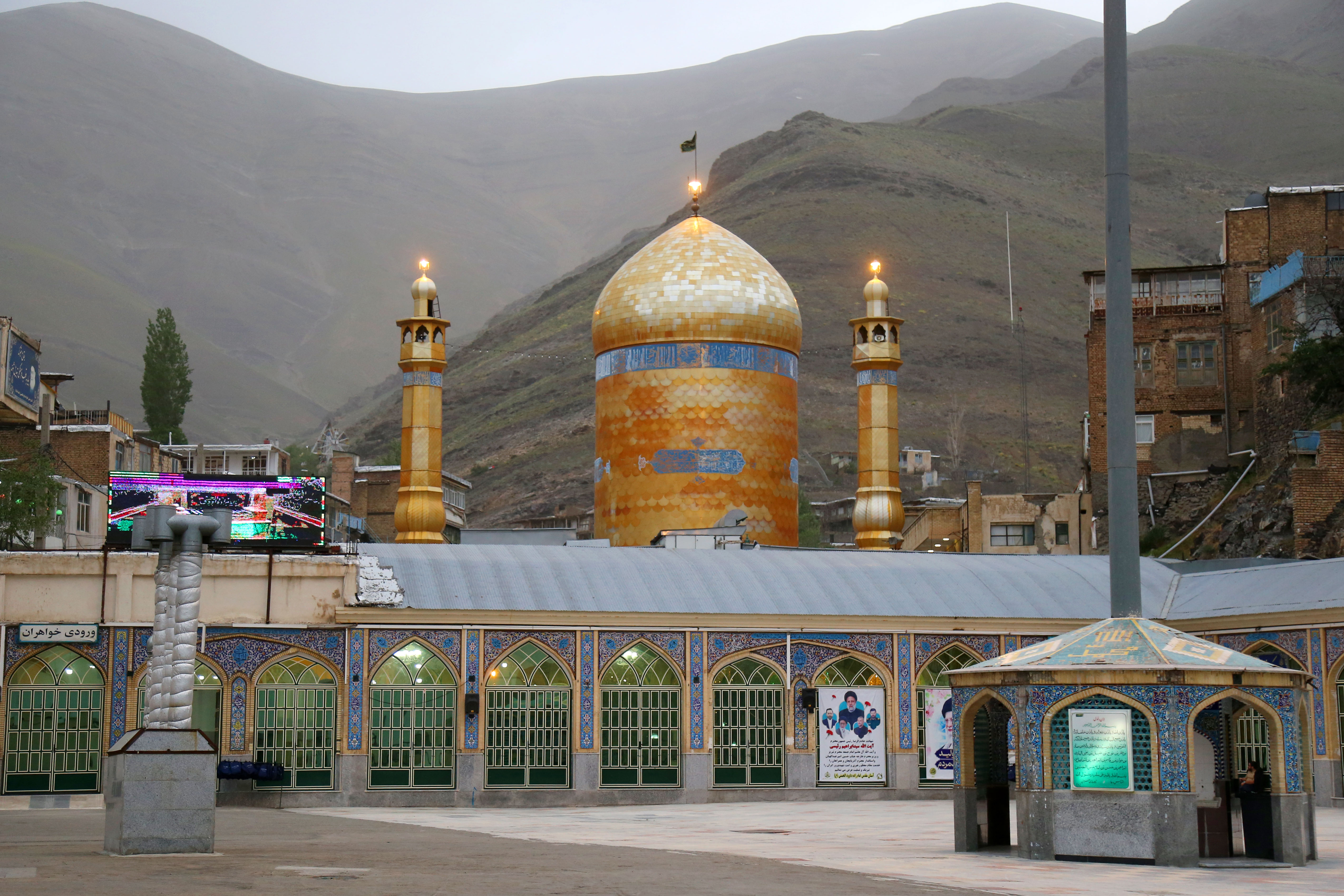
Emamzadeh Shrine, Kan District, Tehran County
