= Khalazir =

Village in Tehran province, Iran

Khalazir Persian: خلازير
- Village
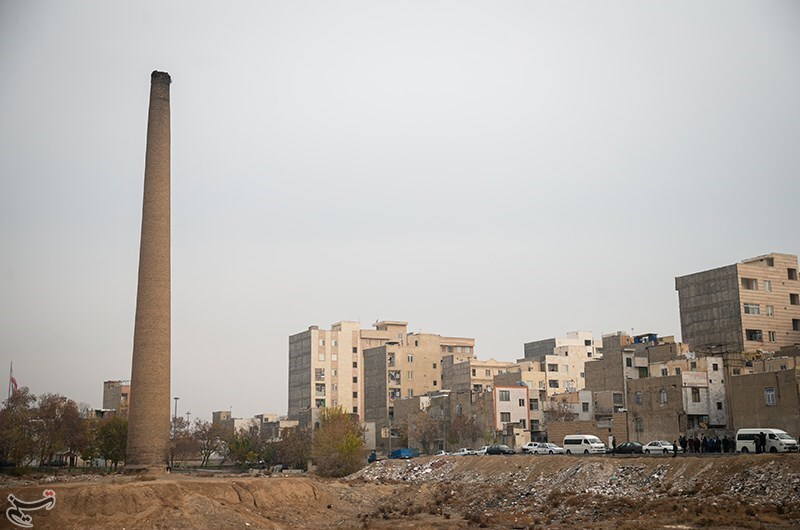

- Location within Iran
- Coordinates: 35°36′25″N 51°21′46″E
- Country: Iran
- Province: Tehran
- County: Tehran
- District: Aftab
- Rural District: Khalazir

Population (2016)
  - Total: 2,356
- Time zone: UTC+3:30 (IRST)

Khalazir (Persian: خلازير) (Note: Also romanized as Khalāzīr and Kholāzīr; also known as Khalāzīl) is a village in, and the capital of, Khalazir Rural District in Aftab District of Tehran County, Tehran province, Iran.

== Demographics ==
=== Population ===
At the time of the 2006 National Census, the village's population was 2,374 in 615 households. The following census in 2011 counted 2,818 people in 799 households. The 2016 census measured the population of the village as 2,356 people in 702 households.
