= Jahanabad, Tehran =

Village in Tehran province, Iran

Jahanabad Persian: جهان اباد
- Village
- Location within Iran
- Coordinates: 35°31′42″N 51°19′13″E
- Country: Iran
- Province: Tehran
- County: Tehran
- District: Aftab
- Rural District: Khalazir

Population (2016)
  - Total: 81
- Time zone: UTC+3:30 (IRST)

Jahanabad (Persian: جهان اباد) (Note: Also romanized as Jahānābād; also known as Jahānābād Bālā and Jahānābād-e Bālā) is a village in Khalazir Rural District of Aftab District in Tehran County, Tehran province, Iran.

== Demographics ==
=== Population ===
At the time of the 2006 National Census, the village's population was 61 in 15 households. The following census in 2011 counted 213 people in 55 households. The 2016 census measured the population of the village as 81 people in 33 households.
