= Nematabad-e Ghar =

Village in Tehran province, Iran

Nematabad-e Ghar Persian: نعمت ابادغار
- Village
- Location within Iran
- Country: Iran
- Province: Tehran
- County: Tehran
- District: Aftab
- Rural District: Aftab

Population (2016)
  - Total: Below reporting threshold
- Time zone: UTC+3:30 (IRST)

Nematabad-e Ghar (Persian: نعمت ابادغار) (Note: Also romanized as Ne‘matābād-e Ghār; also known as Ne‘matābād-e Chār and Sa‘īdābād) is a village in Aftab Rural District of Aftab District in Tehran County, Tehran province, Iran.

== Demographics ==
=== Population ===
At the time of the 2006 National Census, the village's population was 62 in 15 households. The following census in 2011 counted 123 people in 29 households. The 2016 census measured the population of the village as below the reporting threshold.
