= Aftab (disambiguation) =

Aftab may refer to:

- Aftab, surname and given name

Includes lists of people with this name

- IRIB AFTAB, a television channel in Iran
- A former weekly publication, closed in June 2003 in Afghanistan
- Aftab, Iran, a village in Tehran Province, Iran
- Aftab District, an administrative subdivision of Tehran Province, Iran
- Aftab Rural District, an administrative subdivision of Tehran Province, Iran
- Order of Aftab, Persian decoration
