= Jafarabad-e Baqeraf =

Village in Tehran province, Iran

Jafarabad-e Baqeraf Persian: جعفرابادباقراف
- Village
- Location within Iran
- Coordinates: 35°33′38″N 51°23′45″E
- Country: Iran
- Province: Tehran
- County: Tehran
- District: Aftab
- Rural District: Aftab

Population (2016)
  - Total: 427
- Time zone: UTC+3:30 (IRST)

Jafarabad-e Baqeraf (Persian: جعفرابادباقراف) (Note: Also romanized as Ja‘farābād-e Bāqerāf; also known as Ja‘farābād-e Bāqerāt) is a village in Aftab Rural District of Aftab District in Tehran County, Tehran province, Iran.

== Demographics ==
=== Population ===
At the time of the 2006 National Census, the village's population was 518 in 109 households. The following census in 2011 counted 530 people in 128 households. The 2016 census measured the population of the village as 427 people in 104 households.
