= Shahrak-e Resalat =

Town in Tehran province, Iran

Shahrak-e Resalat Persian: شهرک رسالت
- Town
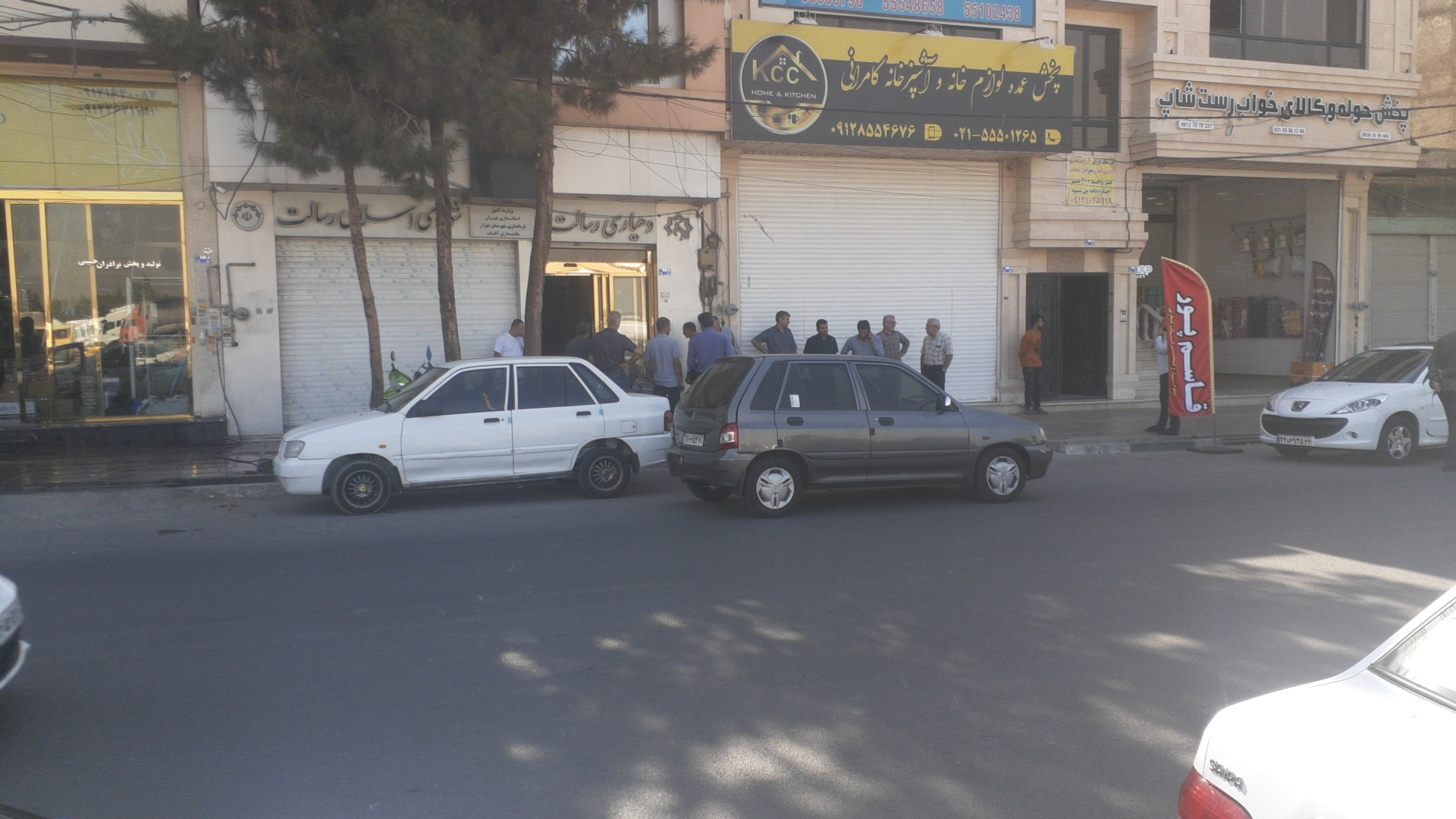

- Location within Iran
- Coordinates: 35°36′27″N 51°22′47″E
- Country: Iran
- Province: Tehran
- County: Tehran
- District: Aftab
- Rural District: Aftab

Population (2016)
  - Total: 8,625
- Time zone: UTC+3:30 (IRST)

Shahrak-e Resalat (Persian: شهرک رسالت) (Note: Also romanized as Shahrak-e Resālat) is a Town in Aftab Rural District of Aftab District in Tehran County, Tehran province, Iran. It is a southern suburb of the city of Tehran.

== Demographics ==
=== Population ===
At the time of the 2006 National Census, the town's population was 10,173 in 2,429 households. The following census in 2011 counted 10,095 people in 2,818 households. The 2016 census measured the population of the town as 8,625 people in 2,627 households. It was the most populous village in its rural district.
