= Qaleh Now-e Hajji Musa =

Village in Tehran province, Iran

Qaleh Now-e Hajji Musa Persian: قلعه نو حاجی موسی
- Village
- Location within Iran
- Coordinates: 35°34′36″N 51°23′01″E
- Country: Iran
- Province: Tehran
- County: Tehran
- District: Aftab
- Rural District: Aftab

Population (2016)
  - Total: 1,079
- Time zone: UTC+3:30 (IRST)

Qaleh Now-e Hajji Musa (Persian: قلعه نو حاجی موسی) (Note: Also romanized as Qal‘eh Now-e Ḩājjī Mūsá; also known as Qal‘eh Now-e Ḩāj Mūsá, Qal‘eh Now-e Ḩājj Mūsá, Qal‘eh Now-ye Ḩa Mūsá, and Qal‘eh Now-ye Ḩaj Mūsá) is a village in Aftab Rural District of Aftab District in Tehran County, Tehran province, Iran.

== Demographics ==
=== Population ===
At the time of the 2006 National Census, the village's population was 903 in 209 households. The following census in 2011 counted 1,038 people in 271 households. The 2016 census measured the population of the village as 1,079 people in 300 households.
