= Emamzadeh Aqil, Tehran =

Village in Tehran province, Iran

Emamzadeh Aqil Persian: امامزاده عقيل
- Village
- Location within Iran
- Coordinates: 35°52′16″N 51°15′33″E
- Country: Iran
- Province: Tehran
- County: Tehran
- District: Kan
- Rural District: Sulqan

Population (2016)
  - Total: 32
- Time zone: UTC+3:30 (IRST)

Emamzadeh Aqil (Persian: امامزاده عقيل) (Note: Also romanized as Emāmzādeh ‘Aqīl) is a village in Sulqan Rural District of Kan District in Tehran County, Tehran province, Iran.

== Demographics ==
=== Population ===
At the time of the 2006 National Census, the village's population was 18 in five households. The following census in 2011 counted a population below the reporting threshold. The 2016 census measured the population of the village as 32 people in 12 households.
