= Rahimabad, Tehran =

Village in Tehran province, Iran

Coordinates: 35°32′24″N 51°19′38″E

Rahimabad Persian: رحيم اباد
- Village
- Location within Iran
- Country: Iran
- Province: Tehran
- County: Tehran
- District: Aftab
- Rural District: Khalazir

Population (2016)
  - Total: 43
- Time zone: UTC+3:30 (IRST)

Rahimabad (Persian: رحيم اباد) (Note: Also romanized as Raḩīmābād) is a village in Khalazir Rural District of Aftab District in Tehran County, Tehran province, Iran.

== Demographics ==
=== Population ===
At the time of the 2006 National Census, the village's population was 46 in 16 households. The following census in 2011 counted 56 people in 14 households. The 2016 census measured the population of the village as 43 people in 11 households.
