= Keshar-e Olya =

Village in Tehran province, Iran

Keshar-e Olya Persian: كشارعليا
- Village
- Location within Iran
- Coordinates: 35°48′54″N 51°13′49″E
- Country: Iran
- Province: Tehran
- County: Tehran
- District: Kan
- Rural District: Sulqan
- Elevation: 1,700–1,760 m (5,580–5,770 ft)

Population (2016)
  - Total: 774
- Time zone: UTC+3:30 (IRST)

Keshar-e Olya (Persian: كشارعليا) (Note: Also romanized as Keshār-e ‘Olyā; also known as Keshār-e Bālā) is a village in Sulqan Rural District of Kan District in Tehran County, Tehran province, Iran.

== Demographics ==
=== Population ===
At the time of the 2006 National Census, the village's population was 541 in 127 households. The following census in 2011 counted 473 people in 136 households. The 2016 census measured the population of the village as 774 people in 243 households.
