= Morteza Gerd =

Village in Tehran province, Iran

Morteza Gerd Persian: مرتضي گرد
- Village
- Location within Iran
- Coordinates: 35°36′08″N 51°20′55″E
- Country: Iran
- Province: Tehran
- County: Tehran
- District: Aftab
- Rural District: Khalazir

Population (2016)
  - Total: 15,506
- Time zone: UTC+3:30 (IRST)

Morteza Gerd (Persian: مرتضی گرد) (Note: Also romanized as Morteẕá Gerd) is a village in Khalazir Rural District of Aftab District in Tehran County, Tehran province, Iran.

== Demographics ==
=== Population ===
At the time of the 2006 National Census, the village's population was 3,556 in 837 households. The following census in 2011 counted 8,217 people in 2,249 households. The 2016 census measured the population of the village as 15,506 people in 4,474 households. It was the most populous village in its rural district.

== Archeology ==
Between 1934 and 1938 the area was excavated by the German archeologist Eric F. Schmidt, who discovered Neolithic pottery resembling similar types from Tepe Sialk and Cheshmeh Ali.
