= Keshar-e Sofla =

Village in Tehran province, Iran

Keshar-e Sofla Persian: كشارسفلی
- Village
- Location within Iran
- Coordinates: 35°48′37″N 51°14′37″E
- Country: Iran
- Province: Tehran
- County: Tehran
- District: Kan
- Rural District: Sulqan
- Elevation: 1,650 m (5,410 ft)

Population (2016)
  - Total: 136
- Time zone: UTC+3:30 (IRST)

Keshar-e Sofla (Persian: كشارسفلی) (Note: Also romanized as Keshār-e Soflá; also known as Keshār-e Pā’īn) is a village in Sulqan Rural District of Kan District in Tehran County, Tehran province, Iran.

== Demographics ==
=== Population ===
At the time of the 2006 National Census, the village's population was 183 in 41 households. The following census in 2011 counted 150 people in 42 households. The 2016 census measured the population of the village as 136 people in 40 households.
