= Abbasabad-e Rostamabad =

Village in Tehran province, Iran

Abbasabad-e Rostamabad Persian: عباس ابادرستم اباد
- Village
- Location within Iran
- Coordinates: 35°35′12″N 51°20′19″E
- Country: Iran
- Province: Tehran
- County: Tehran
- District: Aftab
- Rural District: Khalazir

Population (2016)
  - Total: 30
- Time zone: UTC+3:30 (IRST)

Abbasabad-e Rostamabad (Persian: عباس ابادرستم اباد) (Note: Also romanized as ‘Abbāsābād-e Rostamābād; also known as ‘Abbāsābād) is a village in Khalazir Rural District of Aftab District in Tehran County, Tehran province, Iran.

== Demographics ==
=== Population ===
At the time of the 2006 National Census, the village's population was 73 in 13 households. The following census in 2011 counted 18 people in five households. The 2016 census measured the population of the village as 30 people in 10 households.
