= Talun =

Village in Tehran province, Iran

Talun Persian: طالون
- Village
- Location within Iran
- Coordinates: 35°54′17″N 51°15′58″E
- Country: Iran
- Province: Tehran
- County: Tehran
- District: Kan
- Rural District: Sulqan
- Elevation: 2,180 m (7,150 ft)

Population (2016)
  - Total: 170
- Time zone: UTC+3:30 (IRST)

Talun (Persian: طالون) (Note: Also romanized as Ţālūn or Tālūn) is a village in Sulqan Rural District of Kan District in Tehran County, Tehran province, Iran.

== Demographics ==
=== Population ===
At the time of the 2006 National Census, the village's population was 196 in 56 households. The following census in 2011 counted 97 people in 30 households. The 2016 census measured the population of the village as 170 people in 55 households.
