= Sangan-e Pain, Tehran =

Village in Tehran province, Iran

Sangan-e Pain Persian: سنگان پايين
- Village
- Location within Iran
- Coordinates: 35°51′53″N 51°14′24″E
- Country: Iran
- Province: Tehran
- County: Tehran
- District: Kan
- Rural District: Sulqan

Population (2016)
  - Total: 509
- Time zone: UTC+3:30 (IRST)

Sangan-e Pain (Persian: سنگان پايين) (Note: Also romanized as Sangān-e Pā’īn) is a village in Sulqan Rural District of Kan District in Tehran County, Tehran province, Iran.

== Demographics ==
The village did not appear in the 2006 and 2011 National Censuses. The 2016 census measured the population of the village as 509 people in 179 households.
