= Kashanak, Tehran =

Village in Tehran province, Iran

Kashanak Persian: کاشانک
- Village
- Location within Iran
- Coordinates: 35°31′56″N 51°18′06″E
- Country: Iran
- Province: Tehran
- County: Tehran
- District: Aftab
- Rural District: Khalazir

Population (2016)
  - Total: 486
- Time zone: UTC+3:30 (IRST)

Kashanak (Persian: کاشانک) (Note: Also romanized as Kāshānak) is a village in Khalazir Rural District of Aftab District in Tehran County, Tehran province, Iran.

== Demographics ==
=== Population ===
At the time of the 2006 National Census, the village's population was 421 in 110 households. The following census in 2011 counted 445 people in 137 households. The 2016 census measured the population of the village as 486 people in 154 households.
