= Sangan-e Bala, Tehran =

Village in Tehran province, Iran

Sangan-e Bala Persian: سنگان بالا
- Village
- Location within Iran
- Coordinates: 35°52′24″N 51°14′07″E
- Country: Iran
- Province: Tehran
- County: Tehran
- District: Kan
- Rural District: Sulqan

Population (2016)
  - Total: 481
- Time zone: UTC+3:30 (IRST)

Sangan-e Bala (Persian: سنگان بالا) (Note: Also romanized as Sangān-e Bālā) is a village in Sulqan Rural District of Kan District in Tehran County, Tehran province, Iran.

== Demographics ==
The village did not appear in the 2006 and 2011 National Censuses. The 2016 census measured the population of the village as 481 people in 156 households.
