= Varish =

Village in Tehran province, Iran

Varish Persian: واريش
- Village
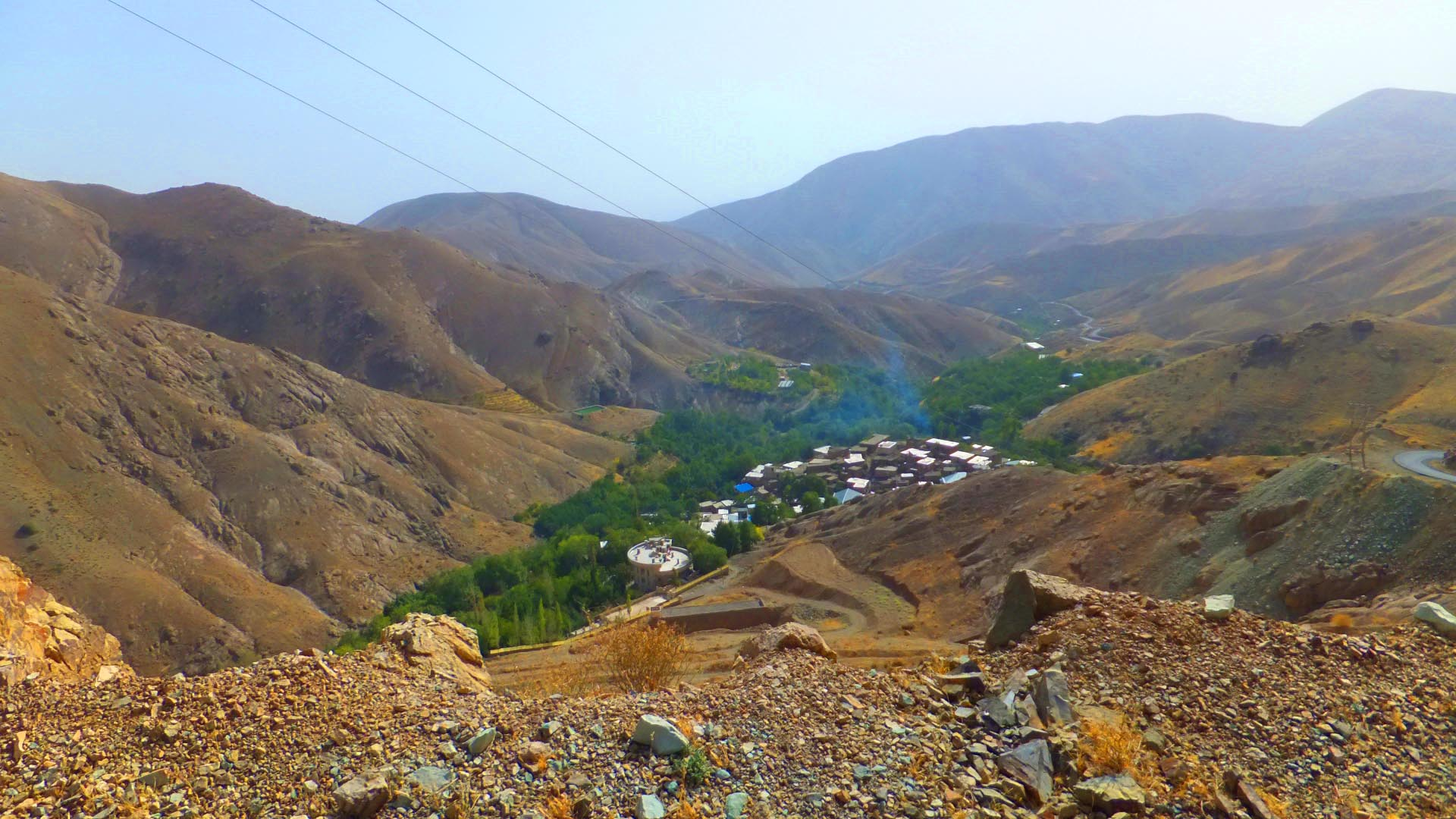
- The village of Varish

- Location within Iran
- Coordinates: 35°49′44″N 51°10′26″E
- Country: Iran
- Province: Tehran
- County: Tehran
- District: Kan
- Rural District: Sulqan

Population (2016)
  - Total: 483
- Time zone: UTC+3:30 (IRST)

Varish (Persian: واريش) (Note: Also romanized as Vārīsh) is a village in Sulqan Rural District of Kan District in Tehran County, Tehran province, Iran.

== Demographics ==
=== Population ===
At the time of the 2006 National Census, the village's population was 56 in 15 households. The following census in 2011 counted 170 people in 56 households. The 2016 census measured the population of the village as 483 people in 145 households.
