= Kigah =

Village in Tehran province, Iran

Kigah Persian: كيگاه
- Village
- Location within Iran
- Coordinates: 35°51′41″N 51°18′36″E
- Country: Iran
- Province: Tehran
- County: Tehran
- District: Kan
- Rural District: Sulqan
- Elevation: 2,050 m (6,730 ft)

Population (2016)
  - Total: 290
- Time zone: UTC+3:30 (IRST)

Kigah (Persian: كيگاه) (Note: Also romanized as Kīgāh; also known as Kīgā (كيگا)) is a village in Sulqan Rural District of Kan District in Tehran County, Tehran province, Iran.

== Demographics ==
=== Population ===
At the time of the 2006 National Census, the village's population was 333 in 81 households. The following census in 2011 counted 392 people in 105 households. The 2016 census measured the population of the village as 290 people in 86 households.
