= Randan, Tehran =

Village in Tehran province, Iran

Randan Persian: رندان
- Village
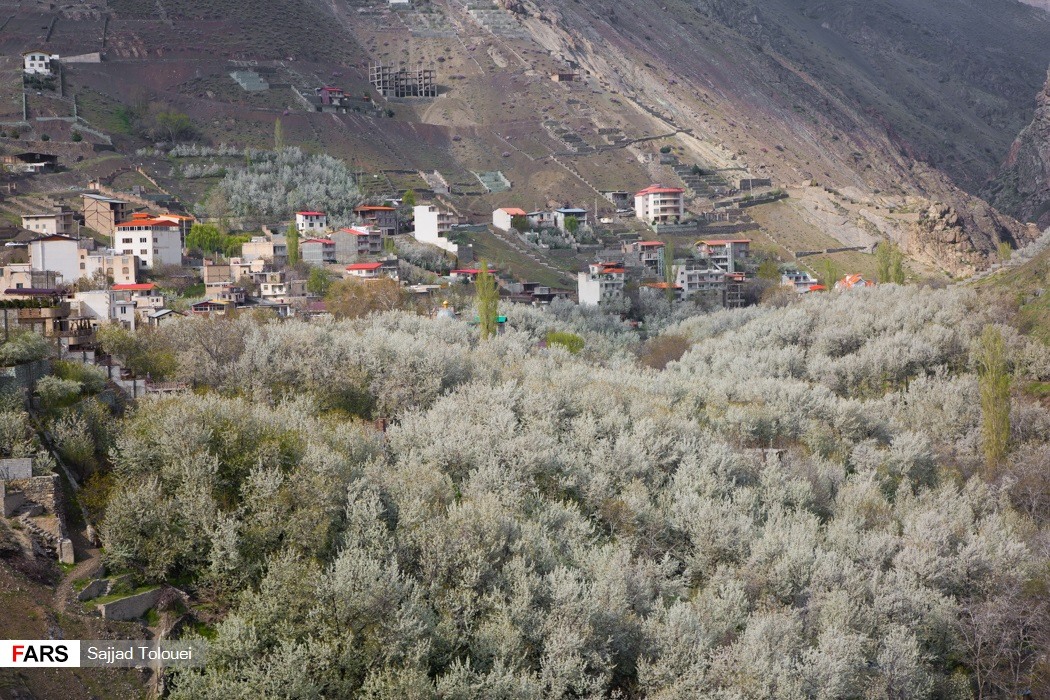
- The village of Randan

- Location within Iran
- Coordinates: 35°53′26″N 51°16′53″E
- Country: Iran
- Province: Tehran
- County: Tehran
- District: Kan
- Rural District: Sulqan
- Elevation: 2,000–2,120 m (6,560–6,960 ft)

Population (2016)
  - Total: 297
- Time zone: UTC+3:30 (IRST)

Randan (Persian: رندان) (Note: Also romanized as Randān and Rendān; also known as Rindān) is a village in Sulqan Rural District of Kan District in Tehran County, Tehran province, Iran.

== Demographics ==
=== Population ===
At the time of the 2006 National Census, the village's population was 223 in 65 households. The following census in 2011 counted 102 people in 31 households. The 2016 census measured the population of the village as 297 people in 91 households.
