= Randan =

Randan may refer to several places:

- Randan, Tehran, Iran
- Randan, Puy-de-Dôme, France
  - Château de Randan
- Randan, Kurdistan

== See also ==
- Fulvie de Randan (1533–1607), French court official
