= Kiga =

Kiga may refer to:

- the Kiga people of Rwanda and Uganda
- the Kiga language
- Kiga, Iran, a village in Tehran Province
- Kiga Station, a train station in Japan

== See also ==
- Kigga, a village in India
