= Bagh-e Darreh-ye Sangan =

Village in Tehran province, Iran

Bagh-e Darreh-ye Sangan Persian: باغ دره سنگان
- Village
- Location within Iran
- Coordinates: 35°52′22″N 51°14′19″E
- Country: Iran
- Province: Tehran
- County: Tehran
- District: Kan
- Rural District: Sulqan

Population (2016)
  - Total: 218
- Time zone: UTC+3:30 (IRST)

Bagh-e Darreh-ye Sangan (Persian: باغ دره سنگان) (Note: Also romanized as Bāgh-e Darreh-ye Sangān) is a village in Sulqan Rural District of Kan District in Tehran County, Tehran province, Iran.

== Demographics ==
The village did not appear in the 2006 and 2011 National Censuses. The 2016 census measured the population of the village as 218 people in 64 households.
