= Khalazir Rural District =

Rural district in Tehran province, Iran

Khalazir Rural District Persian: دهستان خلازير
- Rural District
- Location within Iran
- Coordinates: 35°34′N 51°20′E
- Country: Iran
- Province: Tehran
- County: Tehran
- District: Aftab
- Established: 1986
- Capital: Khalazir

Population (2016)
  - Total: 20,004
- Time zone: UTC+3:30 (IRST)

Khalazir Rural District (Persian: دهستان خلازير) is in Aftab District of Tehran County, Tehran province, Iran. Its capital is the village of Khalazir.

== Demographics ==
=== Population ===
At the time of the 2006 National Census, the rural district's population was 8,051 in 1,977 households. There were 13,285 inhabitants in 3,663 households at the following census of 2011. The 2016 census measured the population of the rural district as 20,004 in 5,810 households. The most populous of its 13 villages was Morteza Gerd, with 15,506 people.

=== Other villages in the rural district ===
- Abbasabad-e Rostamabad
- Dinarabad
- Jafarabad-e Jangal
- Jahanabad
- Kashanak
- Marjanabad
- Moradabad
- Palain
- Rahimabad
- Shokrabad
- Valiabad
