= Aftab, Iran =

Village in Tehran province, Iran

Aftab Persian: آفتاب
- Village
- Location within Iran
- Coordinates: 35°32′56″N 51°20′43″E
- Country: Iran
- Province: Tehran
- County: Tehran
- District: Aftab
- Rural District: Aftab

Population (2016)
  - Total: 114
- Time zone: UTC+3:30 (IRST)

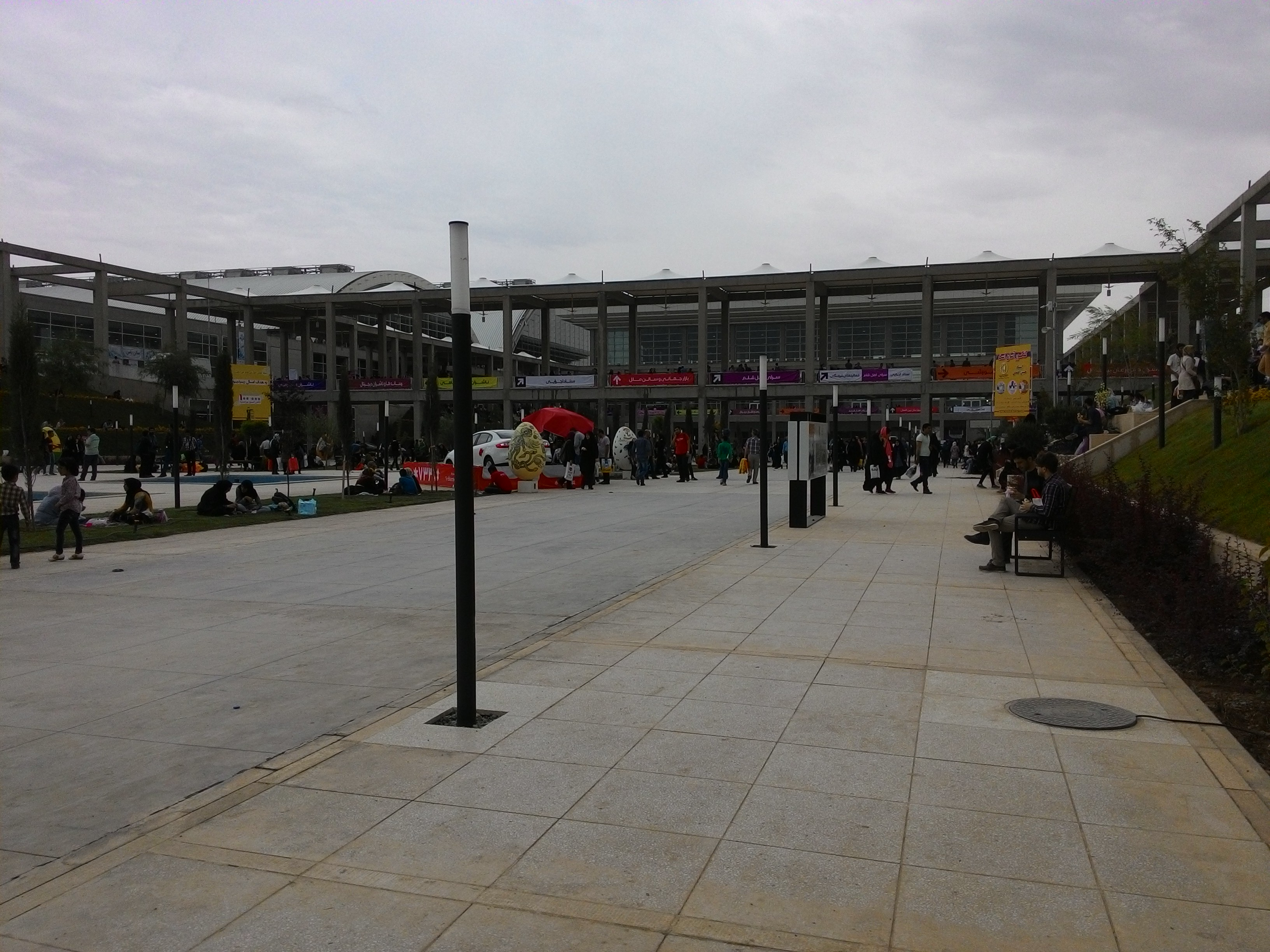
A view of the 29th Tehran International Book Fair.

Aftab (Persian: آفتاب) (Note: Also romanized as Āftāb; also known as Saidabad-e Ahanch (سعيد آباد آهنچ)) is a village in Aftab Rural District of Aftab District in Tehran County, Tehran province, Iran, serving as capital of both the district and the rural district.

== Demographics ==
=== Population ===
At the time of the 2006 National Census, the village's population was 116 in 28 households. The following census in 2011 counted 112 people in 27 households. The 2016 census measured the population of the village as 114 people in 31 households.
