= Kuhsar Park =

Forest park in Tehran, Iran

Koohsar Shahran Forest Park
- پارک جنگلی كوهسار شهران
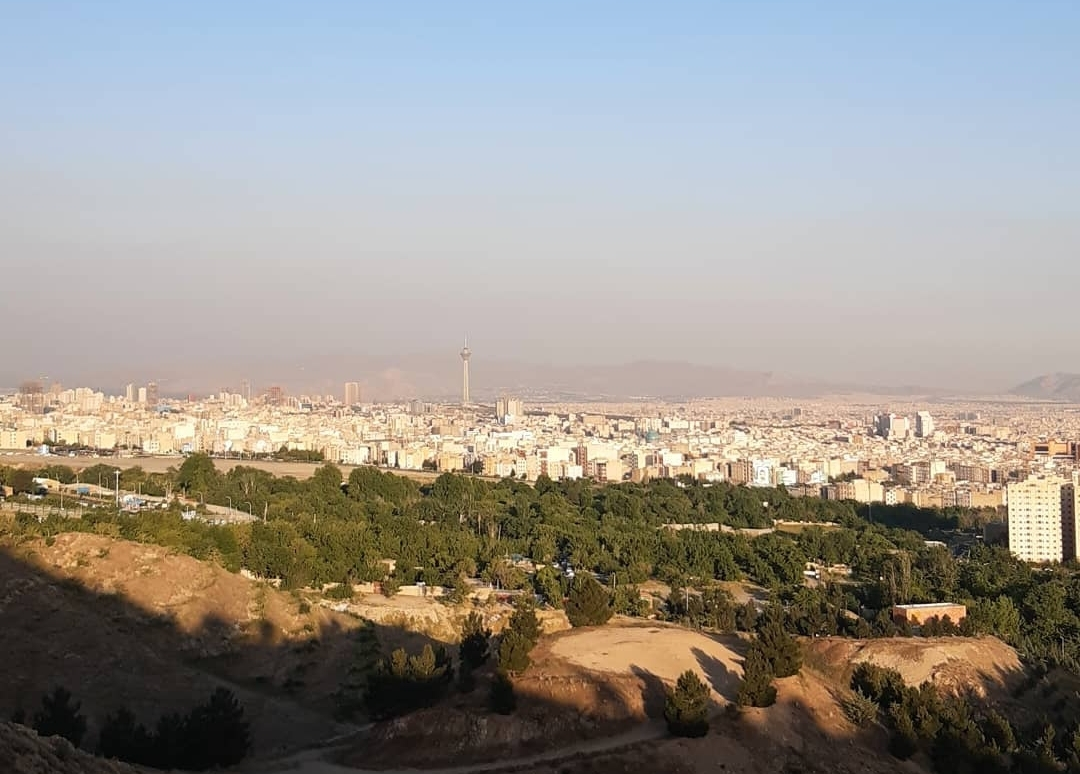
- View of Koohsar Shahran Forest Park 2020
- Interactive map of Koohsar Shahran Forest Park
- Type: Urban park, Forest park
- Location: Koohsar Blvd, Shahran, Tehran, Iran
- Coordinates: 35°46′43.1″N 51°16′33.7″E
- Area: 10 square kilometres (3.9 sq mi)
- Owner: Tehran municipality
- Operator: Tehran municipality
- Open: 7am-10pm
- Public transit: Metro and bus; see below

Koohsar Shahran Park is a forest park located in shahran, northern Tehran, Iran. It covers an area of about 10 square kilometers, and includes ramps and facilities for cycling and skating. Koohsar Shahran Park has 2 main entrances, One on Koohsar Boulevard and another on Shahran Boulevard. Also, Koohsar Shahran is Tehran's largest forest park. Due to the clean air, many people in Tehran come to Koohsar Shahran Park for walking and sport activities.

== Structures and facilities ==
=== Recreational and sports facilities ===
Recreational and sports facilities in Koohsar Shahran Park:

- Motorcycling Cycle
- Paragliding
- Children's Playground
- Gazebo
- Restaurants and coffeehouse
- Amusement Park

== Transportation ==
Koohsar Shahran Forest Park has 2 main entrances, One on Koohsar Boulevard (Western entrance) and another on Shahran Boulevard (Eastern entrance).

=== Public transport ===
People will easily reach the park via Tehran Metro Line 6. Koohsar metro station is located near the park. Also, Koohsar Bus Station is located next to Koohsar Forest Park.

== Gallery ==
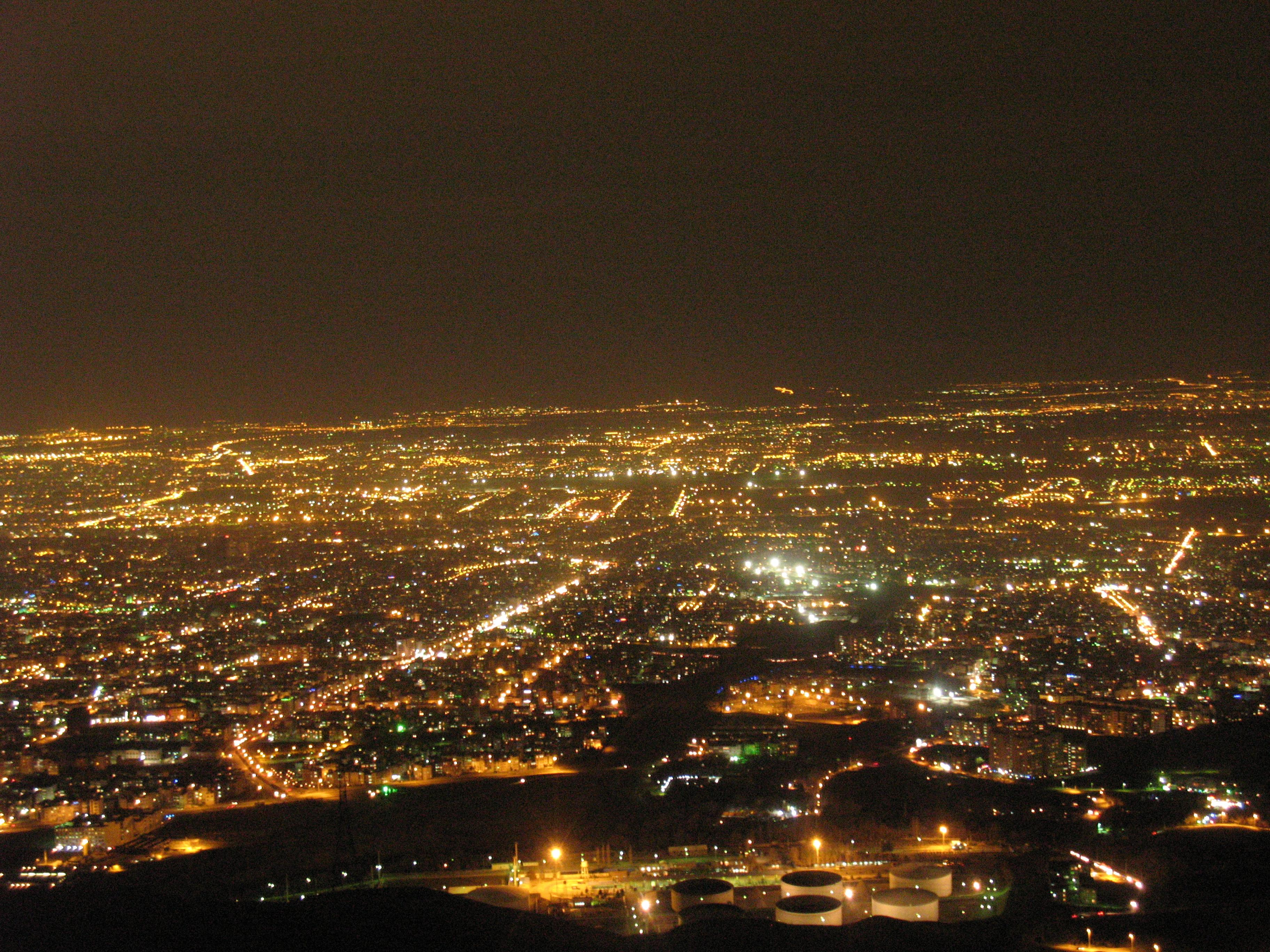
Tehran seen from Koohsar Forest Park

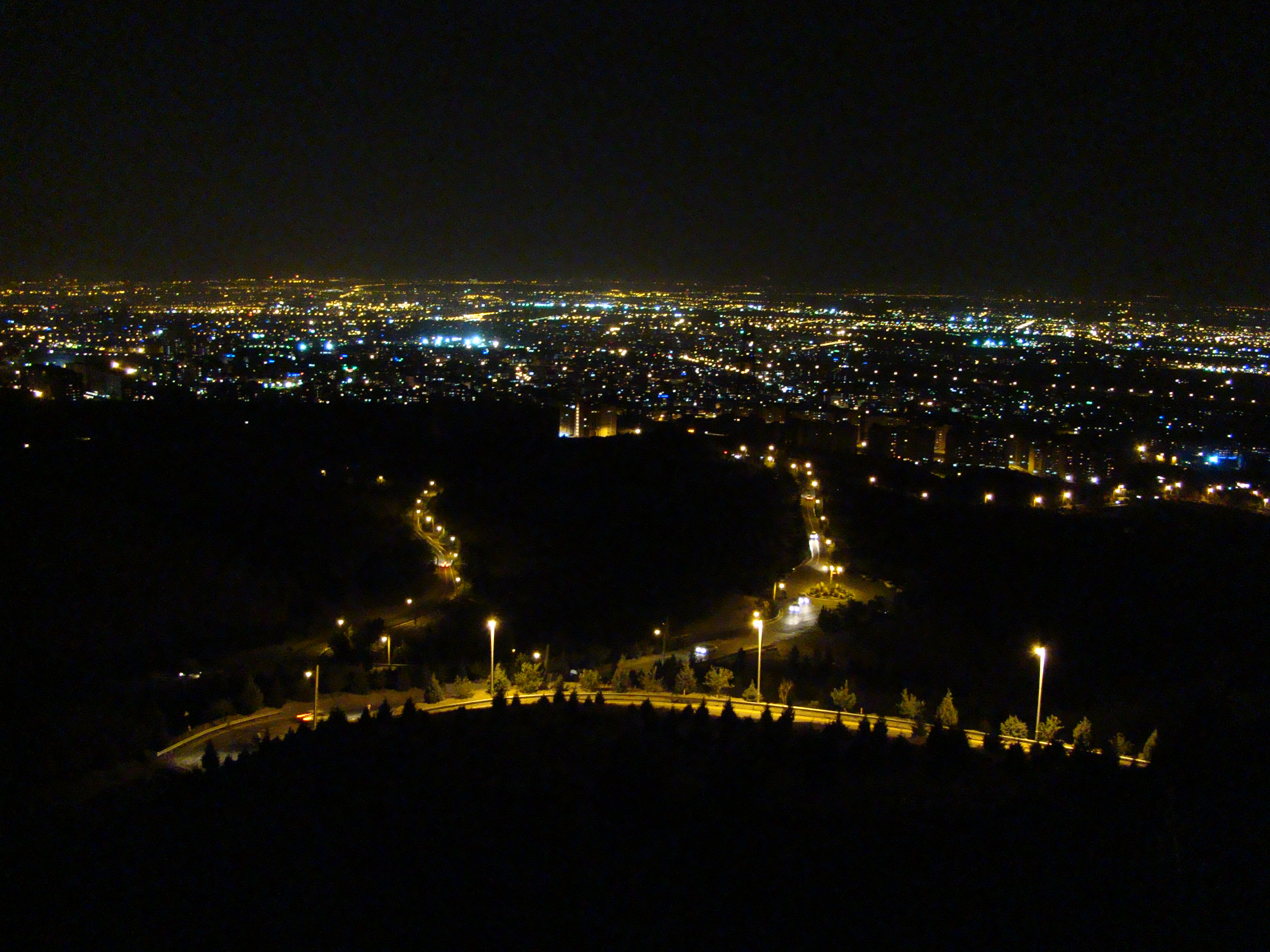
Koohsar Forest Park in May 2007

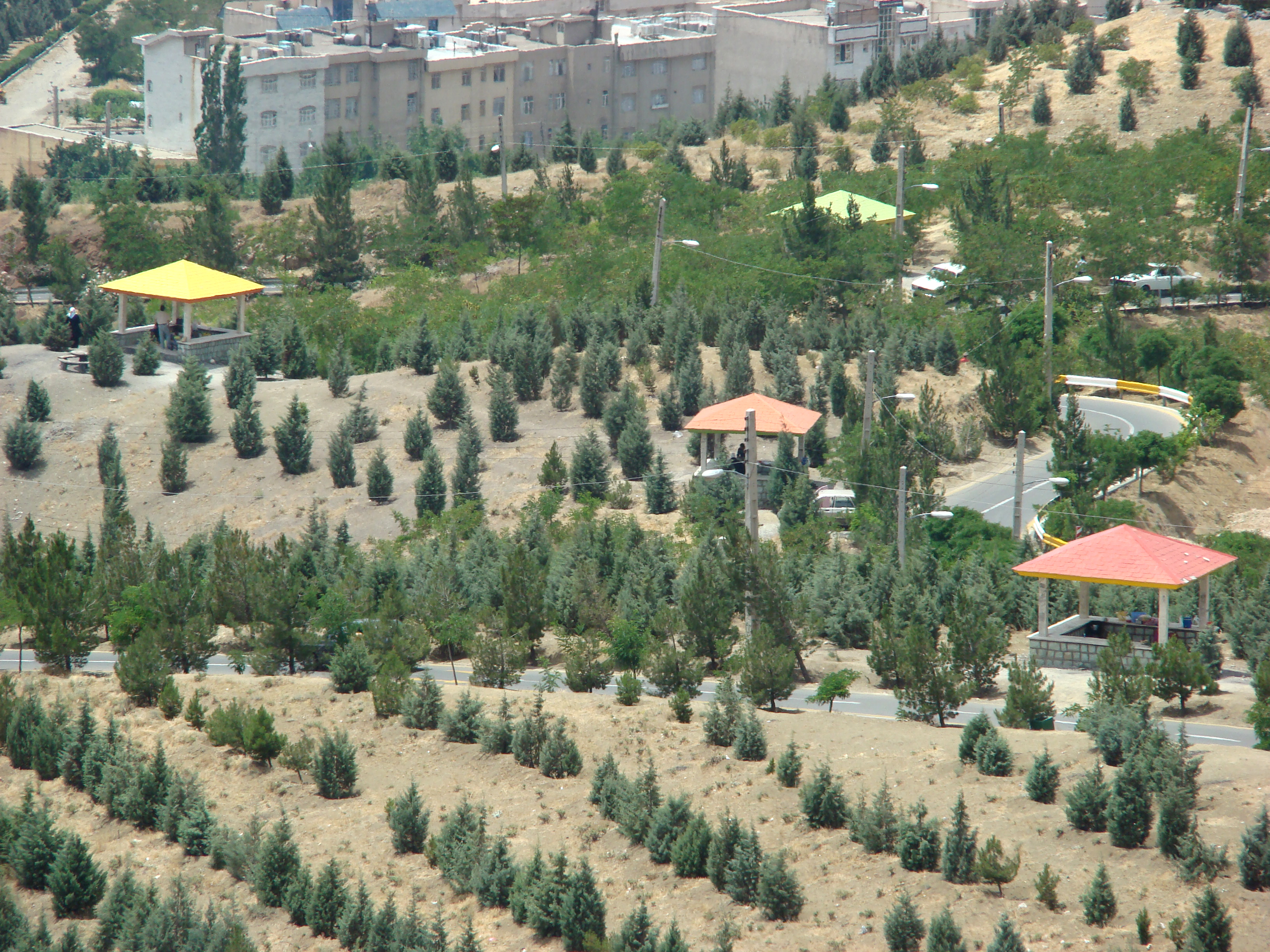
Koohsar Forest Park in June 2007

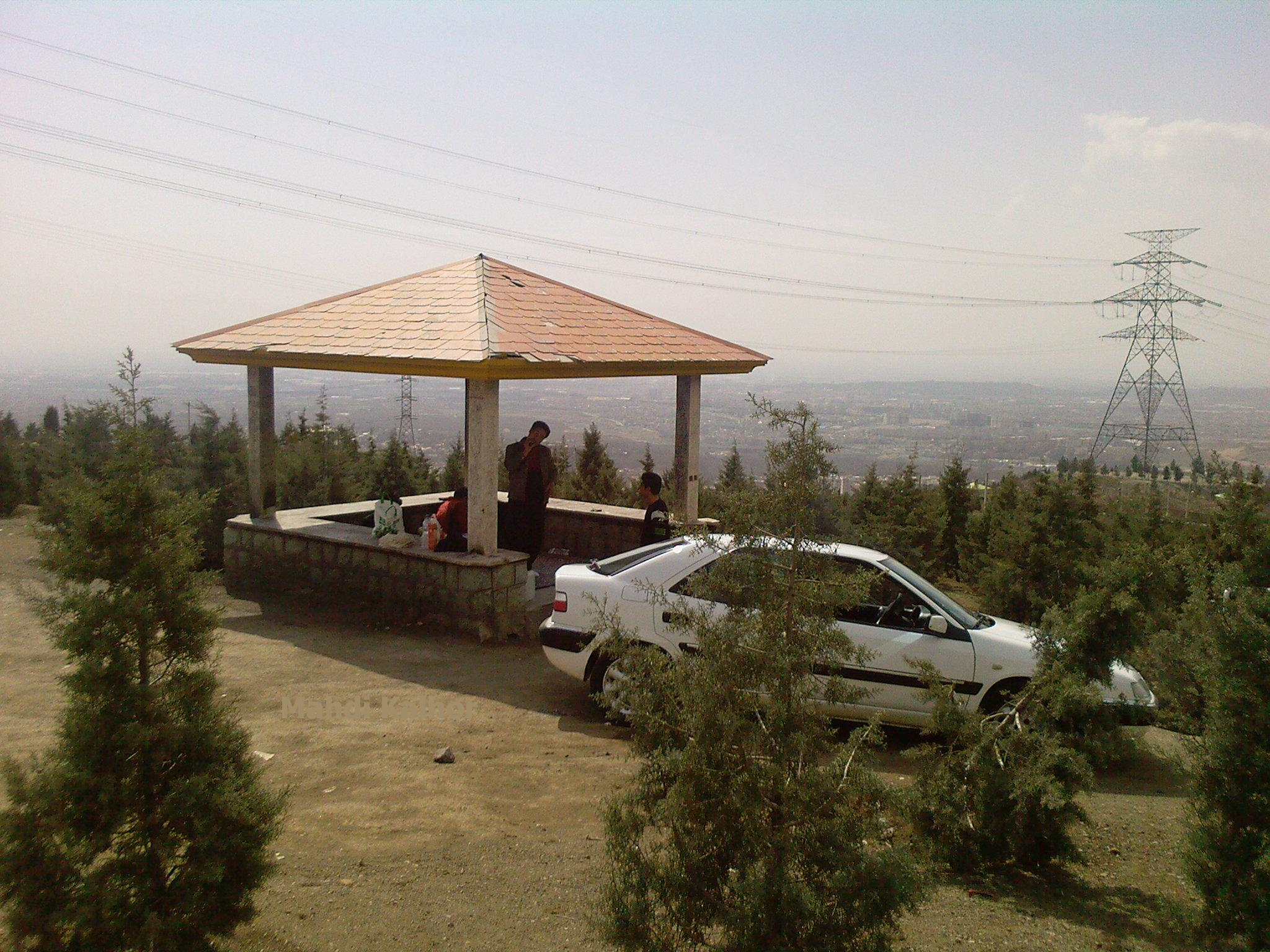
Tourists in August 2006

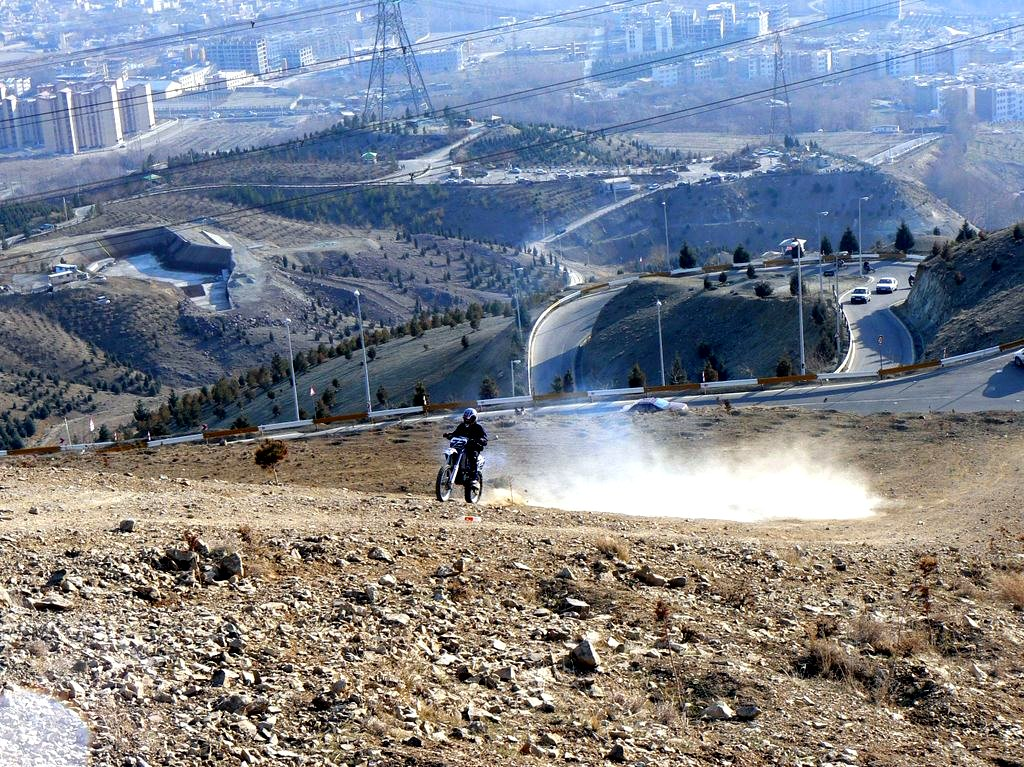
Motorcycling in the park
