= Sangan Waterfall =

Coordinates: 35°53′43″N 51°12′20″E

Sangan Waterfall (Persian: آبشار سنگان) is an Iranian waterfall located near Sangan Village, 20 kilometres (12 mi) north-west of Tehran.

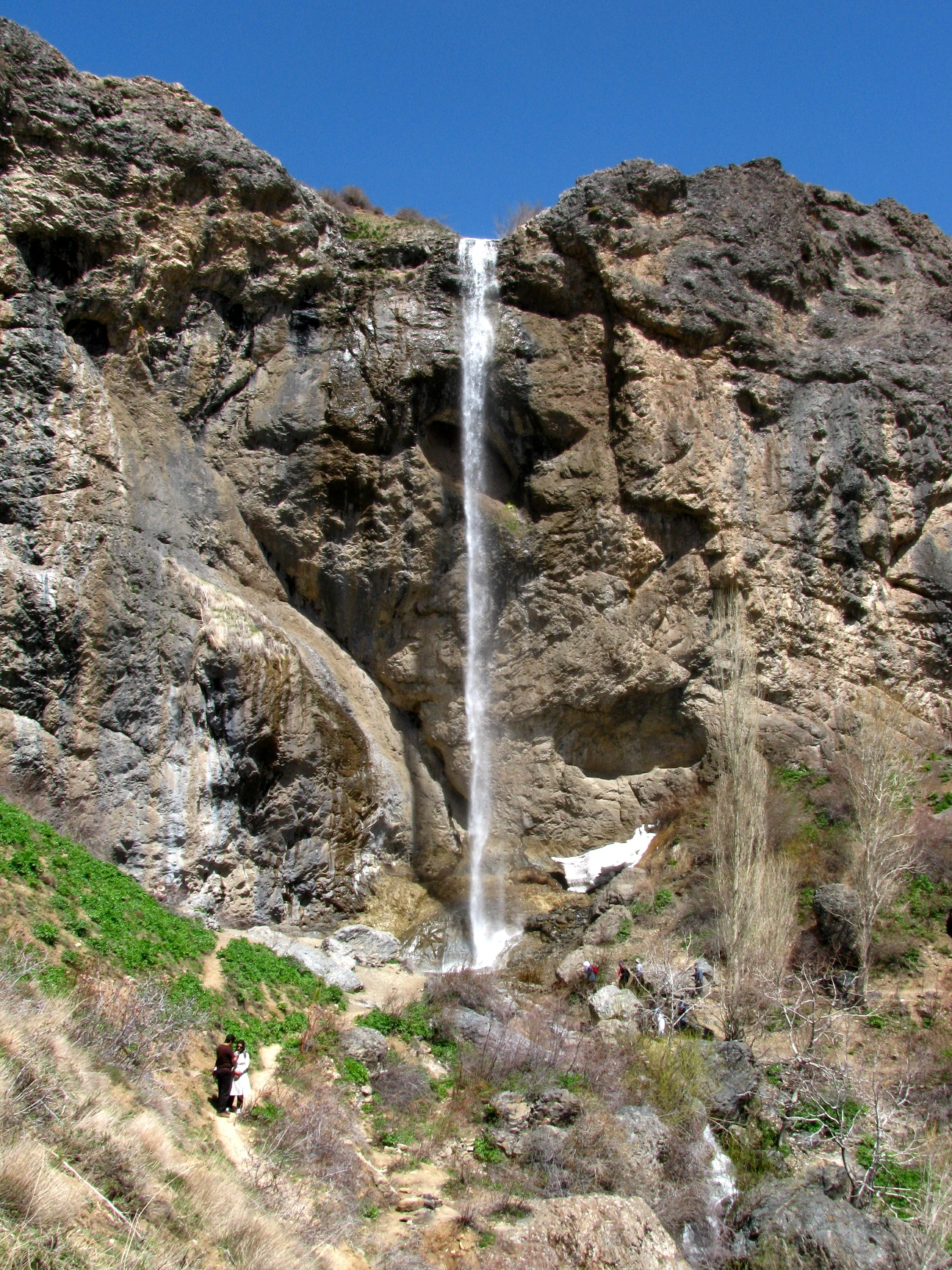
