= Aftab Rural District =

Rural district in Tehran province, Iran

Aftab Rural District Persian: دهستان آفتاب
- Rural District
- Location within Iran
- Coordinates: 35°35′N 51°23′E
- Country: Iran
- Province: Tehran
- County: Tehran
- District: Aftab
- Established: 2005
- Capital: Aftab

Population (2016)
  - Total: 12,626
- Time zone: UTC+3:30 (IRST)

Aftab Rural District (Persian: دهستان آفتاب) is in Aftab District of Tehran County, Tehran province, Iran. Its capital is the village of Aftab.

== Demographics ==
=== Population ===
At the time of the 2006 National Census, the rural district's population was 14,847 in 3,520 households. There were 15,117 inhabitants in 4,148 households at the following census of 2011. The 2016 census measured the population of the rural district as 12,626 in 3,727 households. The most populous of its nine villages was Shahrak-e Resalat, with 8,625 people.

=== Other villages in the rural district ===
- Hasanabad-e Baqeraf
- Jafarabad-e Baqeraf
- Karimabad
- Nematabad-e Ghar
- Qaleh Now-e Hajji Musa
- Rashidabad
- Salehabad-e Seyyedabad
