= Kashanak, Isfahan =

Kashanak كاشانك
- Village
- Location within Iran
- Coordinates: 33°10′27″N 52°36′34″E
- Country: Iran
- Province: Isfahan
- County: Ardestan
- Bakhsh: Central
- Rural District: Kachu

Population (2006)
  - Total: 34
- Time zone: UTC+3:30 (IRST)
  - Summer (DST): UTC+4:30 (IRDT)

Kashanak (Persian: كاشانك, also Romanized as Kāshānak; also known as Kāshāvak) is a village in Kachu Rural District, in the Central District of Ardestan County, Isfahan Province, Iran. At the 2006 census, its population was 34, in 13 families.
