= Sulqan Rural District =

Rural district in Tehran province, Iran

Sulqan Rural District Persian: دهستان سولقان
- Rural District
- Location within Iran
- Coordinates: 35°53′N 51°14′E
- Country: Iran
- Province: Tehran
- County: Tehran
- District: Kan
- Established: 1987
- Elevation: 1,600–1,750 m (5,250–5,740 ft)

Population (2016)
  - Total: 5,013
- Time zone: UTC+3:30 (IRST)

Sulqan Rural District (Persian: دهستان سولقان) is in Kan District of Tehran County, Tehran province, Iran.

== Demographics ==
=== Population ===
At the time of the 2006 National Census, the rural district's population was 63,514 in 15,837 households. There were 2,469 inhabitants in 739 households at the following census of 2011. The 2016 census measured the population of the rural district as 5,013 in 1,613 households. The most populous of its 16 villages was Vardij, with 778 people.

=== Other villages in the rural district ===
- Bagh-e Darreh-ye Sangan
- Emamzadeh Aqil
- Emamzadeh Davud
- Keshar-e Olya
- Keshar-e Sofla
- Kigah
- Randam
- Sangan-e Bala
- Sangan-e Pain
- Sangan-e Vosta
- Talun
- Varish
