= Kan District =

District in Tehran province, Iran

Kan District Persian: بخش کن
- District
- Location within Iran
- Coordinates: 35°53′N 51°14′E
- Country: Iran
- Province: Tehran
- County: Tehran
- Established: 1987

Population (2016)
  - Total: 5,013
- Time zone: UTC+3:30 (IRST)

Kan District (Persian: بخش کن) is in Tehran County, Tehran province, Iran.

== Demographics ==
=== Population ===
At the time of the 2006 National Census, the district's population was 63,514 in 15,837 households. The 2011 census counted 2,469 people in 739 households. The 2016 census measured the population of the district as 5,013 inhabitants in 1,613 households.

=== Administrative divisions ===
Kan District Population
Administrative Divisions	2006	2011	2016
Sulqan RD	63,514	2,469	5,013
Total	63,514	2,469	5,013
RD = Rural District
