= Aftab District =

District in Tehran province, Iran

Aftab District Persian: بخش آفتاب
- District
- Location within Iran
- Coordinates: 35°34′N 51°20′E
- Country: Iran
- Province: Tehran
- County: Tehran
- Established: 2005
- Capital: Aftab

Population (2016)
  - Total: 32,630
- Time zone: UTC+3:30 (IRST)

Aftab District (Persian: بخش آفتاب) is in Tehran County, Tehran province, Iran. Its capital is the village of Aftab.

== Demographics ==
=== Population ===
At the time of the 2006 National Census, the district's population was 22,898 in 5,497 households. The following census in 2011 counted 28,402 people in 7,811 households. The 2016 census measured the population of the district as 32,630 inhabitants in 9,537 households.

=== Administrative divisions ===
Aftab District Population
Administrative Divisions	2006	2011	2016
Aftab RD	14,847	15,117	12,626
Khalazir RD	8,051	13,285	20,004
Total	22,898	28,402	32,630
RD = Rural District
