= Tehran County =

County in Tehran province, Iran

Tehran County Persian: شهرستان تهران
- County
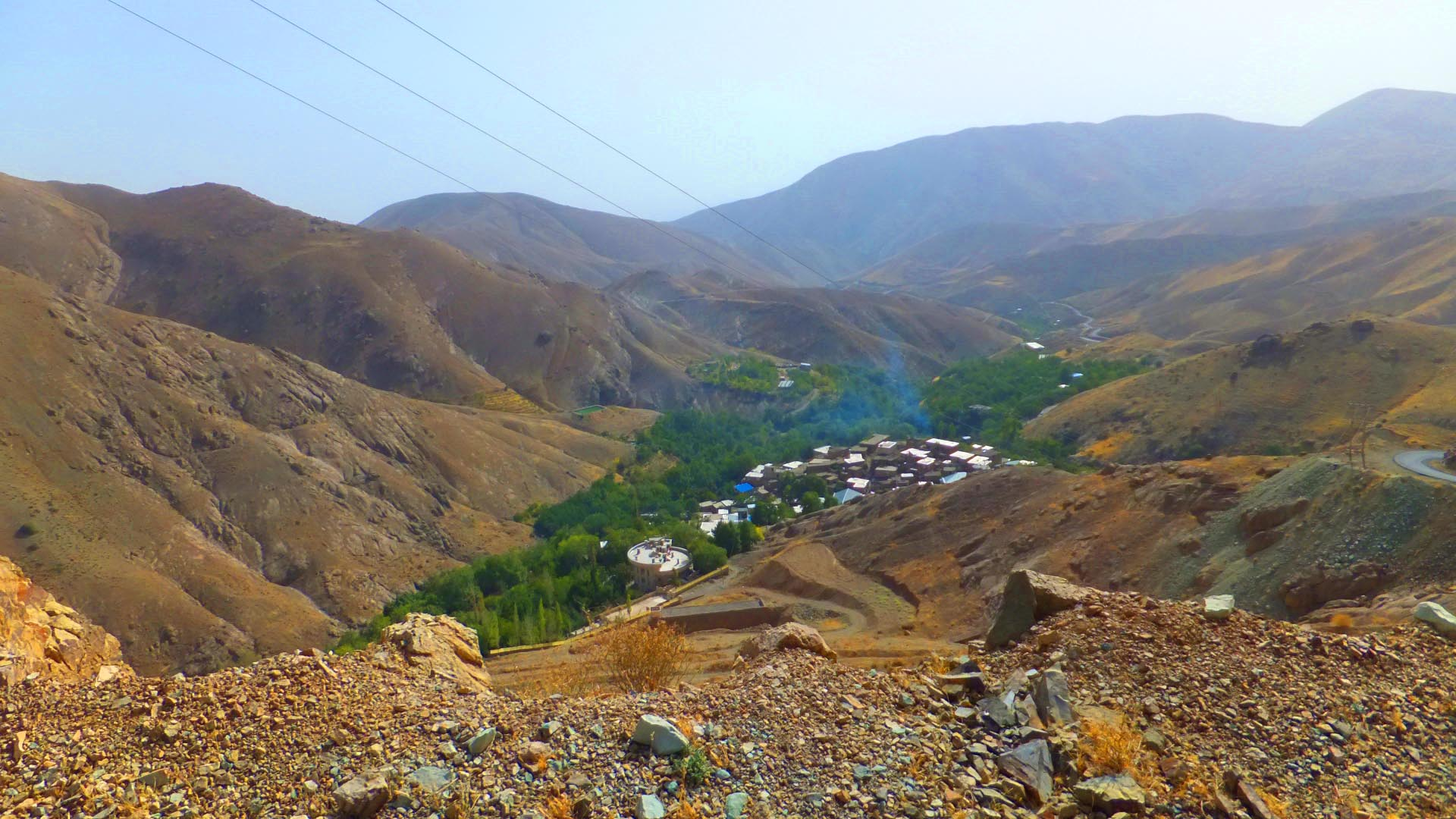
- The village of Varish in Kan District

- Location of Tehran County in Tehran province (top, yellow)

- Location of Tehran province in Iran
- Coordinates: 35°45′N 51°25′E
- Country: Iran
- Province: Tehran
- Established: 1987
- Capital: Tehran
- Districts: Central, Aftab, Kan

Area
  - Total: 1,300.3 km^{2} (502.0 sq mi)

Population (2016)
  - Total: 8,737,510
  - Density: 6,719.6/km^{2} (17,404/sq mi)
- Time zone: UTC+3:30 (IRST)

Tehran County Historical Population
Year	Pop.	±%
1940	540,087	—
1956	1,512,082	+180.0%
1966	2,719,730	+79.9%
2006	7,892,340	+190.2%
2011	8,189,791	+3.8%
2016	8,737,510	+6.7%
amar.org.ir Excluding areas part of the county during previous censuses

Tehran County (Persian: شهرستان تهران) is in Tehran province of Iran. Its capital is the city of Tehran. Greater Tehran is situated mostly in the county, the most populous in Iran.

== History ==
In 2012, the cities of Bumahen and Pardis, and most of Siyahrud Rural District, were separated from the county in the establishment of Pardis County.

== Demographics ==
=== Population ===
At the time of the 2006 National Census, the county's population was 7,882,843 in 2,313,002 households. The following census in 2011 counted 8,293,140 people in 2,637,704 households. The 2016 census measured the population of the county as 8,737,510 in 2,924,208 households.

=== Administrative divisions ===
Tehran County's population history and administrative structure over three consecutive censuses are shown in the following table.

Tehran County Population
Administrative Divisions	2006	2011	2016
Central District	7,796,431	8,262,262	8,699,284
Siyahrud RD (Note: Most transferred to Pardis County)	16,837	17,503	5,578
Bumahen (city) (Note: Transferred to Pardis County)	43,004	53,451	
Pardis (city)	25,360	37,257	
Tehran (city)	7,711,230	8,154,051	8,693,706
Aftab District	22,898	28,402	32,630
Aftab RD	14,847	15,117	12,626
Khalazir RD	8,051	13,285	20,004
Kan District	63,514	2,469	5,013
Sulqan RD	63,514	2,469	5,013
Total	7,882,843	8,293,140	8,737,510
RD = Rural District

== See also ==
- Media related to Tehran County at Wikimedia Commons
