= List of attacks during the Twelve-Day War =

This is a list of airstrikes and bombardments during the Twelve-Day War. The war began on 13 June 2025, when Israel attacked targets at more than a dozen locations across Iran. Under the codename Operation Rising Lion, (Note: Hebrew: מבצע עם כלביא.) the Israel Defense Forces (IDF) and Mossad attacked key nuclear sites, military installations, and residential areas, including targeted assassinations of military and civilian personnel, many of whom were killed in their homes or in meetings. Beginning on the evening of 13 June, Iran initiated retaliatory strikes against Israel, under the codename Operation True Promise III. (Note: Previously Iran had launched Operation True Promise I and Operation True Promise II on a more limited scale.) (Note: Persian: عملیات وعده صادق ٣) The operation consisted of ballistic missiles and drones targeting military sites, intelligence sites, and residential areas. Iran also threatened to target American, British, and French military bases if they provided assistance to Israel. On 22 June, the United States conducted Operation Midnight Hammer, which involved airstrikes on three Iranian nuclear facilities. Iran responded by attacking U.S. bases in Iraq and Qatar as part of Operation Glad Tidings of Victory.

== Operation Rising Lion ==
Operation Rising Lion targets
map of recorded strikes by Israeli military on Iranian targets (approximate for some items)
1 Natanz Nuclear Facility
2 Fordow Fuel Enrichment Plant
3 Isfahan Nuclear Technology Center
4 Arak (IR-40) Reactor
5 Parchin Military Complex
6 Bushehr Nuclear Power Plant
7 Tabriz (2nd Tactical Airbase)
8 Mehrabad (1st Tactical Airbase)
9 IRGC Headquarters (Tehran)
10 Ministry of Defense
11 Evin Prison
12 Palestine Square
13 Hamadan Airbase (Nojeh)
14 Khatami Airbase (8th Tactical)
15 Mashhad Airport (14th Tactical)
16 Kermanshah Underground Missile Facility
17 Bid Ganeh Ballistic Missile Base
18 Khomein Missile Base
19 Khojir Missile Production Complex
20 Khorramabad Missile Base
21 Shiraz Missile Base
22 Najafabad Missile Base
23 Qom Ammunition Bunker
24 IRGC Zanjan Military Base
25 IRGC 29th Nabi Akram Division
26 IRGC Ahvaz Military Base
27 Dezful Ammunition Depot
28 Shahid Soltani Garrison (approx.)
29 Garmsar Missile Fuel Facility (approx.)
30 Sobashi Radar Site (province approx.)

Beginning on 13 June 2025, under the codename Operation Rising Lion, (Note: Hebrew: מבצע עם כלביא.) the Israel Defense Forces (IDF) and Mossad attacked key Iranian nuclear sites, military installations, and residential areas, including targeted assassinations of military and civilian personnel, many of whom were killed in their homes or in meetings.

=== Nuclear facilities ===
Operation Rising Lion attacks on Iranian nuclear facilities
Airstrike target	Damage information
Natanz Nuclear Facility	The Pilot Fuel Enrichment Plant (PFEP), a multi-story enrichment hall with thousands of advanced gas centrifuges used to produce 60% enriched uranium, was destroyed with at least three explosive impacts visible in satellite imagery. It was reported by the Royal United Services Institute that the damage to the PFEP might have been caused by GBU-31(V)3 or GBU-28, two types of bunker buster bombs. The Institute for the Study of War (ISW) reported that at least five areas in the Natanz Nuclear Facility were damaged or destroyed by Israeli airstrikes.
Natanz Nuclear Facility	An electrical substation feeding power to the Natanz Nuclear Facility was damaged causing a site-wide power outage. Backup generators were also destroyed. The delicate gas centrifuges in the underground cascade hall containing part of the PFEP and the main Fuel Enrichment Plant were likely severely damaged or destroyed by this unexpected loss of power.
Natanz Nuclear Facility	Significant damage occurred to the air defense systems around the nuclear facility.
Esfahan Nuclear Technology Center	A metallic uranium production facility at the Esfahan Nuclear Technology Center (ENTC) was damaged or destroyed.
Esfahan Nuclear Technology Center	The Uranium Conversion Facility, which is used "for re-converting enriched uranium to produce nuclear fuel" was damaged.
Esfahan Nuclear Technology Center	The Fuel Plate Fabrication Plant at the center was damaged.
Esfahan Nuclear Technology Center	The IAEA announced that a fourth "critical building" at the center was damaged, without specifying which building.
Arak Nuclear Complex	The IR-40 reactor containment building was destroyed by a direct hit on 19 June, as were distillation towers at the adjacent heavy water production plant.
Fordow Fuel Enrichment Plant	The Atomic Energy Organization of Iran stated that the Fordow Fuel Enrichment Plant had been struck by an airstrike on 12 June, and that there had been limited damage to the site. The IDF, however, denies having struck the site. According to The Times of Israel, the reason for the differing claims is not clear. The BBC reported there was "no visible damage" to the Fordow Fuel Enrichment Plant as of 15 June.
Fordow Fuel Enrichment Plant	On 16 June, a second Israeli airstrike struck the Fordow Fuel Enrichment Plant, causing no damage. The airstrike triggered nearby earthquake sensors.
Parchin Military Complex	Multiple airstrikes on June 12 and June 15 caused damage to the Parchin Military Complex, which is used "to develop and manufacture explosive materials and advanced munitions, including ballistic missiles". Parchin, was also the target of Israeli airstrikes in October 2024.
Iran Centrifuge Technology Company	Israeli airstrikes caused damage to two buildings at the Iran Centrifuge Technology Company (TESA) in Karaj, which were used to produce parts for centrifuges.
Tehran Nuclear Research Center	An Israeli airstrike caused damage to a building at the Tehran Nuclear Research Center (TNRC), which was used to manufacture and test advanced centrifuge rotors.
Imam Hossein University	An airstrike struck a building at the Imam Hossein University (IHU), which is controlled by the Islamic Revolutionary Guard Corps (IRGC), a branch of the Iranian military. It has a scientific group and a nuclear physics department. In June 2025, the Institute for the Study of War (ISW) stated this strike was targeting the Iranian nuclear weapons program and that IHU "has reportedly been involved in experiments related to nuclear weapons technology". In 2006 the National Council of Resistance of Iran claimed that IHU was the main center for experiments on nuclear weapons technology and that 21 professors and researchers worked on a secret weapons program. Days after the airstrikes, the Congressional Research Service reported Iran had "halted its nuclear weapons program" in 2003 and had not resumed it prior to the airstrikes.

=== Chemical weapon facilities ===
Operation Rising Lion attacks on Iranian chemical weapon facilities
Airstrike target	Damage information
Shahid Meisami Group	Israeli airstrikes destroyed two buildings at the Shahid Meisami Group complex in Karaj, Alborz Province, which is involved research and chemical engineering in the Iranian chemical weapons program.

=== Targeted assassinations ===
Name	Position	Date of death
Mohammad Bagheri	Chief of the General Staff of the Armed Forces of the Islamic Republic of Iran	13 June 2025
Hossein Salami	Commander-in-Chief of the Islamic Revolutionary Guard Corps (IRGC)	13 June 2025
Gholam Ali Rashid	Commander of the Khatam al-Anbiya Central Headquarters	13 June 2025
Amir Ali Hajizadeh	Commander-in-Chief of the IRGC Aerospace Force	13 June 2025
Khosrow Hassani	Deputy Head of the IRGC Aerospace Force	13 June 2025
Masud Shane’i	Chief-of-Staff to the Commander-in-Chief of the Islamic Revolutionary Guard Corps	13 June 2025
Davoud Sheikhian	Commander of the IRGC Air Defenses	13 June 2025
Mohammad Bagher Taherpour	Commander of the IRGC Drone Unit	13 June 2025
Mohammad Agha Jafar	Brigadier General of the IRGC	13 June 2025
Javad Jursera	Brigadier General of the IRGC	13 June 2025
Masoud Tayyeb	Brigadier General of the IRGC	13 June 2025
Mansour Safarpour	Brigadier General of the IRGC	13 June 2025
Gholamreza Mehrabi	Deputy Head of Intelligence for the Armed Forces General Staff	13 June 2025
Mehdi Rabbani	Deputy Head of Operations for the Armed Forces General Staff	13 June 2025
Mohammad Kazemi	Commander of the IRGC Intelligence Organization	15 June 2025
Hassan Mohaghegh	Deputy Head of the IRGC Intelligence Organization	15 June 2025
Ali Shadmani	Commander of the Khatam al-Anbiya Central Headquarters (replaced Gholam Ali Rashid)	17 June 2025
Saeed Izadi	Head of the "Palestine Branch" of the Quds Force	21 June 2025
Behnam Shahriyari	Senior IRGC official affiliated with Unit 190	21 June 2025
Ali Reza Lotfi	Deputy Head of IRGC Intelligence Organization	24 June 2025
Mohammad Taghi Yusefvand	Head of the Information Protection Unit within the paramilitary volunteer militia Basij	24 June 2025
Fereydoon Abbasi	Nuclear Scientist, former Member of the Parliament of Iran and former Head of the Atomic Energy Organization of Iran	13 June 2025
Saeed Borji	Nuclear scientist	13 June 2025
Ahmadreza Zolfaghari Daryani	Nuclear scientist	13 June 2025
Abdolhamid Minouchehr	Nuclear scientist	13 June 2025
Mohammad Mehdi Tehranchi	Nuclear scientist	13 June 2025
Mansour Asgari	Nuclear scientist	13 June 2025
Ali Bakouei	Nuclear scientist	13 June 2025
Amir Hossein Faqhi	Nuclear scientist	14 June 2025
Akbar Motlebizadeh	Nuclear scientist	14 June 2025
Seyyed Isar Tabatabai Qomsheh	Nuclear scientist	21 June 2025
Mohammad Reza Seddighi Saber	Nuclear scientist	21 June 2025
Neda Rafiei Parsa	Head of the Information Technology department at Tavanir, Iran's biggest electric power provider	On or before 24 June 2025
Majid Tajanjari	Artificial intelligence expert	19 June 2025
Mohammad Reza Zakerian	Artificial intelligence expert	19 June 2025

=== Government locations ===
Operation Rising Lion attacks on facilities of the Iranian government
Airstrike target	Damage information
Iranian Ministry of Defense	Damage occurred at the headquarters of the Iranian Ministry of Defense. The Israeli Air Force stated the Ministry of Defense, which reports to the President of Iran, not to the Commander-in-Chief of the Iranian Armed Forces, was responsible for advancing the nuclear program of Iran.
Organization of Defensive Innovation and Research	Damage occurred to the Organization of Defensive Innovation and Research (SPND) building, which is the Iranian counterpart to the United States' Defense Advanced Research Projects Agency (DARPA).
Iranian Ministry of Foreign Affairs	The library of the Iranian Ministry of Foreign Affairs building in Tehran was struck, sustained damage, and caused a fire.
Iranian Ministry of Justice	The Iranian Ministry of Justice building in western Tehran was struck and sustained damage, and all the windows in the building were destroyed.
Iranian Ministry of Intelligence	The Iranian Ministry of Intelligence building in Tehran was struck and sustained damage.
Iranian Law Enforcement Command	The Iranian Law Enforcement Command building in Tehran was struck and sustained damage.
Islamic Republic of Iran Broadcasting Headquarters	Israeli forces caused a fire and significant damage to the Islamic Republic of Iran Broadcasting (IRIB) headquarters building in Tehran, causing live broadcasts to go offline. At least four missiles struck the building.
Evin Prison	On 23 June an airstike stoke the main gate of the prison, damaged adjacent facilities such as the judicial and administrative buildings.
Palestine Square Countdown Clock	On 23 June, the countdown clock was reportedly destroyed.

=== Military installations ===
==== Headquarters ====
Operation Rising Lion attacks on Iranian military headquarters
Airstrike target	Damage information
IRGC Headquarters	Damage occurred at the headquarters of the Islamic Revolutionary Guard Corps (IRGC) in Tehran. At least one person was killed in the strike.
IRGC Quds Force Headquarters	Damage occurred at the headquarters of the Quds Force, one of the five branches of the Islamic Revolutionary Guard Corps (IRGC) in Tehran.
IRGC Basij Headquarters	Damage occurred to the headquarters of the Basij, one of the five branches of the Islamic Revolutionary Guard Corps (IRGC) north of Isfahan.
IRGC Khomein Headquarters	Damage occurred to the regional headquarters of the Islamic Revolutionary Guard Corps (IRGC) in Khomein.

==== Airbases ====
Operation Rising Lion attacks on Iranian airbases
Airstrike target	Damage information
Iranian Air Force 2nd Tactical Airbase	Numerous buildings at the Tabriz Shahid Madani International Airport, which also serves as the 2nd Tactical Airbase for the Iranian Air Force were destroyed. The airbase houses three Iranian squadrons that fly Mikoyan MiG-29s and Northrop F-5s. The airbase also houses SA-6 Gainful surface-to-air missile systems.
Iranian Air Force 2nd Tactical Airbase	The airbase runway was cratered, which "prevented aircraft from interfering with Israeli operations".
Hamadan Airbase	An aircraft hangar was damaged, which houses F-4 Phantom aircraft from the 31st Tactical Fighter Squadron.
Hamadan Airbase	The radar located at the airbase was destroyed.
Iranian Air Force 1st Tactical Airbase	The Mehrabad International Airport, which also serves as an airbase for Iranian Air Force (IRIAF) was struck by Israeli missiles, which caused damage and left a fire burning at a hangar for military jets.
Iranian Air Force 1st Tactical Airbase	In a different set of airstrikes, two F-14 Tomcat fighter planes on the tarmac were destroyed.
Asadabad Airport	Several Haj Qasem medium-range ballistic missiles on their launchers were struck and destroyed along the runway at the Asadabad Airport near the village of Bujin.
Iranian Air Force 14th Tactical Airbase	An aerial refueling aircraft at the Mashhad Shahid Hasheminejad International Airport, which also serves as an airbase for the Iranian Air Force, was destroyed, causing an explosion and fire. The airport is 2,300 kilometres (1,400 mi) away from Israeli territory, marking the deepest airstrike that Israeli aircraft have conducted in Iranian territory since the start of the conflict.
Khatami Air Base	Damage occurred to Khatami Air Base, also known as the Iranian Air Force 8th Tactical Airbase. The airbase houses F-14A/AM Tomcats, Chengdu FT-7Ns, and Pilatus PC-7 aircraft.

==== Missile bases ====
Operation Rising Lion attacks on Iranian missile bases
Airstrike target	Damage information
Amand Missile Base	Several buildings, which housed Ghadr-110 medium-range ballistic missiles, at the Amand Missile Base sustained "considerable damage". An explosion and fire occurred at the base three days after the Israeli airstrike.
Tehran Ballistic Missile Air Defense Base	Mossad damaged the Iranian Ballistic Missile Air Defense Base located near Tehran using a drone.
IRGC Tabriz missile launch sites	Two IRGC missile launch sites were destroyed near Tabriz, East Azerbaijan province.
Kermanshah Underground Missile Facility	The Kermanshah Underground Missile Facility (UGF), an underground base of the IRGC Air Force which houses Qiam 1 and Fateh-110 ballistic missiles, was reportedly destroyed. The airstrikes "collapsed the facilities' entry points and silo openings". The Institute for the Study of War (ISW) confirmed "multiple missile storage buildings and vehicle tunnel entrances, which were likely used to store ballistic missiles and other related equipment" were damaged or destroyed. In total, ten locations at the Kermanshah Underground Missile Facility were struck by Israeli missiles.
Bid Ganeh Ballistic Missile Base	Two buildings at the Bid Ganeh Ballistic Missile Base, which "likely stored medium-range ballistic missiles", were destroyed.
Khomein Missile Base	A drive-through facility, "which allows for the efficient movement of missiles and other related equipment", at the Khomein Missile Base was destroyed.
Khorramabad Missile Base	Several storage, missile launch, and administrative buildings at the Khorramabad Missile Base were damaged. The base "contained multiple launchers and storage tunnels for ballistic and cruise missiles".
Shiraz Missile Base	Israel conducted airstrikes on the Shiraz Missile Base, which manufactures, repairs, and stores ballistic missiles on June 13 and 15. The missile base sustained "any noticeable damage", but several vegetation fires occurred in the area surrounding the base.
Garmsar Missile Fuel Production Facility	The missile fuel production facility in Garmsar sustained damage.
Tehrani Moghaddam Missile Base	Extensive damage occurred to the Tehrani Moghaddam Missile Base following nine Israeli airstrikes.
Najafabad Missile Base	Damage from several Israeli airstrikes occurred to the Najafabad Missile Base, operated by the Islamic Revolutionary Guard Corps (IRGC).
Khojir Missile Production Complex	Israeli airstrikes struck the Khojir Missile Production Complex, which produces solid- and liquid-fueled missiles, causing a large explosion and fire.
Shahid Soltani Garrison	An Israeli airstrike caused damage to the Shahid Soltani Garrison near Eshtehard. The Shahid Soltani Garrison is an IRGC missile storage and production site which houses Shahab-3, Qiam, Fateh, and Fath ballistic missiles.

==== Other military bases ====
Operation Rising Lion attacks on other Iranian military bases
Airstrike target	Damage information
IRGC Ground Forces 29th Nabi Akram Division	An ammunition depot for the Islamic Revolutionary Guard Corps Ground Forces's (NEZSA) 29th Nabi Akram Division was destroyed in Kermanshah province.
IRGC Zanjan Military Base	An airstrike caused damaged, a fire, and an explosion at the barracks of the Islamic Revolutionary Guard Corps (IRGC) military base in Zanjan.
Qom Ammunition Bunker	An ammunition bunker in the city of Qom was struck, causing a fire and explosion.
Hazrat-e Masoumeh Air Defense Site	The Hazrat-e Masoumeh Air Defense Site was destroyed, and a colonel in the Iranian Army was killed in the strike. The Hazrat-e Masoumeh Air Defense Site is responsible for protecting the Fordow Fuel Enrichment Plant (FFEP), which is located 16 kilometres (9.9 mi) to the east of the FFEP.
Khondab Air Defense Group	An Israeli airstrike on the Khondab Air Defense Group in the city of Khondab killed two Iranian air defense officers. The Khondab Air Defense Group is responsible for protecting the Heavy Water Reactor at the Arak Nuclear Complex.
IRGC Hazrat-e Ruhollah Unit	An Israeli airstrike in the city of Khomein targeted the Islamic Revolutionary Guard Corps (IRGC)'s Hazrat-e Ruhollah Unit, killing six IRGC Ground Forces personnel, two Basij personnel, five Iranian Air Force's Hazrat-e Masoumeh Air Defense Group personnel, and three IRGC Aerospace Force personnel.
IRGC Piranshahr Military Base	Significant damage occurred at the Piranshahr Military Base, where a radar operated by the Islamic Revolutionary Guard Corps (IRGC) was struck.
IRGC Ghazanchi Military Base	Damage from multiple airstrikes occurred to the Ghazanchi Military Base in Kermanshah province, which is operated by the Islamic Revolutionary Guard Corps's (IRGC) as a ballistic missile launching base.
IRGC Ahvaz Military Base	Damage occurred to the Ahvaz Military Base in Ahvaz, Khuzestan province, which is operated by the Islamic Revolutionary Guard Corps's (IRGC).
Dezful Ammunition Depot	An ammunition depot operated by the IRGC in Dezful was destroyed.
Abadan Naval Base	The Iranian Naval base near the city of Abadan was damaged or destroyed.
IRGC Ground Forces 216th Armored Brigade	An ammunition depot for the NEZSA's 216th Armored Brigade was destroyed in the city of Zanjan.
IRGC base in Sardasht, West Azerbaijan	An unspecified IRGC base was struck.
IRGC warehouses in Kermanshah	Israel conducted airstrikes on and destroyed two IRGC missile storage warehouses in the city of Kermanshah, which caused fires. These warehouses were in residential neighborhoods.
IRGC Ground Forces 8th Najaf-e Ashraf Armored Division	Damage occurred to the barracks of the IRGC Ground Forces 8th Najaf-e Ashraf Armored Division in Najafabad.
IRGC Shahid Kharrazi Barracks	Damage occurred to the Islamic Revolutionary Guard Corps (IRGC) Shahid Kharrazi barracks near Shahin Shahr.

==== Radar installations ====
Operation Rising Lion attacks on Iranian radar installations
Airstrike target	Damage information
IRGC Qods Ghadir Radar	The Ghadir radar operated by the IRGC for western Tehran was damaged.
Sobashi Radar Site	The Sobashi radar site, located in the Khatam ol Anbia Western Air Defense Zone in Hamadan province, which served "as a command center for all of Iran's air defense systems", was destroyed.

==== Other military targets ====
Operation Rising Lion attacks on other Iranian military targets
Airstrike target	Damage information
Shiraz Electronics Industries	Damage was done to the Shiraz Electronics Industries building in the city of Shiraz, Fars province. A fire with black smoke plumes occurred following the strike. The Institute for the Study of War (ISW) reported that the building produced "radar and electronic equipment for the Iranian military, including the Qamar 3-D search and control radar system for air navigation systems and electronic warfare".
Esfahan Ammunition Factory	An ammunition factory in Esfahan, which was used to produce kamikaze drones and ballistic missiles was destroyed.
Iran Helicopter Support and Renewal Company	Damage occurred to the Iran Helicopter Support and Renewal Company (PANHA) building in Tehran. The PANHA is controlled by the Iranian Ministry of Defense.
Iran Aircraft Manufacturing Industries Corporation	Damage occurred to the Iran Aircraft Manufacturing Industries Corporation (HESA) in Shahin Shahr, Isfahan province.

=== Hospitals ===
Operation Rising Lion attacks on Iranian hospitals
Airstrike target	Damage information
Farabi hospital	An Israeli strike severely damaged the Farabi hospital in Kermanshah, western Iran. Iranian media reported that the strike hit a nearby workshop, and the IDF confirmed that the hospital was not the target.

=== Oil/Fuel facilities ===
Operation Rising Lion attacks on Iranian oil and fuel facilities
Airstrike target	Damage information
South Pars Gas Field	Israel struck a natural gas processing facility at the South Pars Gas Field, which triggered an explosion and fire.
Fajr-e Jam Gas Refinery	Israel struck the Fajr-e Jam Gas Refinery in Bushehr province, causing a fire.
Shahran Oil Depot	Israel struck the Shahran oil depot just north of Tehran, causing a fire. The ISW and The New York Times reported that the oil depot "holds three days' worth of fuel for Tehran in at least 11 storage tanks".
Shahr Rey Oil Refinery	Israel struck the Shahr Rey Oil Refinery just south of Tehran, which is one of the largest oil refineries in Iran.
Najafabad Oil Refinery	Israel struck the Najafabad Oil Refinery.

=== Civilian attacks ===
Operation Rising Lion civilian attacks
Airstrike target	Damage information
Nobonyad Square residential building	A 14-story residential building near Nobonyad Square in northeastern Tehran was hit and a section of it collapsed following an Israeli airstrike. The New York Times reported that a "section of the building torn in two, with apartments ripped open". Iranian state television reported that 60 people were killed, including 20 children.
Farda Motors Borujerd Factory	"Extensive damage" occurred to the Farda Motors factory located in the city of Borujerd. On 14 June, the ISW stated "it remains unclear whether Farda Motors had any ties to Iranian military entities or was operating under the direction of Iran's military-industrial organizations".
One Holding Tower	The One Holding Tower in Qasr-e Shirin was damaged from an airstrike.

== Operation True Promise III ==
Operation True Promise III targets
map of recorded strikes by Iranian military on Israeli targets
1 Glilot intelligence base
2 Tel Nof Airbase
3 The Kirya
4 Israeli Military Intelligence School
5 Zipporit weapons production
6 Tulkarem base
7 Beit Nehemia base
8 Ministry of Interior, Haifa
9 Gav Yam Negev Advanced Tech
10 Bazan Oil Refinery Complex
11 Haifa Power Plant
12 Eshkol Power Station, Ashdod

Beginning on the evening of 13 June 2025, Iran initiated retaliatory strikes against Israel, under the codename Operation True Promise III. (Note: Previously Iran had launched Operation True Promise I and Operation True Promise II on a more limited scale.) (Note: Persian: عملیات وعده صادق ٣) The operation consisted of ballistic missiles and drones targeting military sites, intelligence sites, and residential areas. Iran also threatened to target American, British, and French military bases if they provided assistance to Israel.

=== Military installations ===
Operation True Promise III attacks on Israeli military installations
Target	Damage information
Glilot intelligence base	An Iranian missile struck the Glilot military base in Ramat HaSharon during the war, according to satellite data cited in a report published after the end of the war by The Telegraph.
Tel Nof Airbase	An Iranian missile struck the Tel Nof base in Rehovot during the war, according to satellite data cited in a report published by The Telegraph following the end of the conflict.
The Kirya	A ballistic missile struck and damaged the vicinity of the Kirya, an IDF headquarters in Tel Aviv.
Israeli Military Intelligence School	A warehouse building within the Israeli Military Intelligence School at Camp Moshe Dayan in Tel Aviv was destroyed and caught fire after being struck by a ballistic missile.
Zipporit armor and weapons production base	An Iranian missile targeted the Zipporit armor and weapons production base during the war, according to satellite imagery cited in a report published by The Telegraph following the end of the conflict.
Tulkarem base	An Iranian missile struck a military base near Tulkarem during the war, according to satellite imagery cited in a report published by The Telegraph following the end of the conflict.
Beit Nehemia base	A military base near Beit Nehemia was struck twice by Iranian missiles during the war, according to satellite imagery cited in a report published by The Telegraph following the end of the conflict.

=== Government locations ===
Operation True Promise III attacks on Israeli government locations
Target	Damage information
Ministry of Interior office in Haifa	On June 20, a high-rise tower housing government offices in Haifa sustained damage although apparently did not suffer a direct hit. An old mosque located across the street from the tower was also reported to be damaged. At least three civilians were seriously injured in missile strikes on Haifa.

=== American interests ===
Operation True Promise III attacks on interests of the United States
Target	Damage information
United States Embassy Branch Office in Tel Aviv	The shockwave from an Iranian ballistic missile impact in Tel Aviv caused minor damage to the United States' Embassy Branch office in Tel Aviv, with Mike Huckabee, the United States ambassador to Israel saying no one was injured at the branch office.
United States Consulate General in Erbil	The United States shot down two one-way attacks drones near the United States Consulate General in Erbil, Iraq.

=== Hospitals ===
Operation True Promise III attacks on Israeli hospitals
Target	Damage information
Soroka Medical Center	The Soroka Medical Center in Beersheba, the main hospital in southern Israel, was struck by a ballistic missile, causing the hospital to no longer accept new patients except for life-threatening cases. At least 80 people were injured. Iran stated that the hospital had not been an intended target, saying it was aiming for a military and intelligence site located nearby.

=== Research facilities ===
Operation True Promise III attacks on Israeli research facilities
Target	Damage information
Weizmann Institute of Science	The Weizmann Institute of Science, a scientific research center in Rehovot, was struck by two ballistic missile, which damaged several research laboratories. Most of the damage done was to labs that research cancer. More than 200 students were relocated off campus after the attacks. The facility was targeted again on June 20. Around 45 labs were seriously damaged and it was estimated that it would cost between $500 million to $1 billion to repair the institution.
Gav-Yam Negev Advanced Technologies Park	Areas hit on June 20 included the Gav-Yam Negev Advanced Technologies Park in Beersheba. Iran claimed that people "directly" cooperating with Israeli security services in the fields of espionage and AI are present in the area.

=== Oil/Power/Utility facilities ===
Operation True Promise III attacks on Israeli oil, power, and other public utility facilities
Target	Damage information
Bazan Oil Refinery Complex	Three people were killed when several ballistic missiles struck the Bazan Oil Refinery Complex and the nearby oil pipelines in Haifa, which created a large fire. The strikes caused the refinery to shut down all operations.
Haifa Power Plant	Two Iranian ballistic missiles struck the Haifa Power Plant, causing damage and a fire.
Wastewater treatment facility	An Iranian ballistic missile struck a wastewater treatment facility in Herzliya.
Eshkol Power Station, Ashdod	An Iranian missile struck the power plant on 23 June 2025, causing power outrages.

=== Civilian attacks ===
Operation True Promise III civilian attacks
Target	Damage information
Bat Yam	A ballistic missile struck a residential building in Bat Yam, which caused "major damage" and resulted in the deaths of nine people and injuries of over 100 others. The missile also caused damage to 61 other buildings in the surrounding area. Around 200 people were injured, according to the MDA, several seriously. Five of the civilians killed in Bat Yam were Ukrainian nationals.
Tamra residential building	At least four Arab Israelis including a woman, her two daughters and one other female relative, were killed by a ballistic missile striking a residential building in Tamra.
Ramat Gan residential buildings	A ballistic missile struck a residential building in Ramat Gan, killing a woman. Several cars were found burned and three other homes sustained damage from the missile. According to municipal authorities, nine total buildings were completely destroyed from the strike, while hundreds of others sustained varying levels of damage. Approximately 100 residents were displaced from their homes due to the missile barrage.
Rishon LeZion residential buildings	A ballistic missile struck multiple homes in Rishon LeZion, killing two people and injuring at least 17 others.
Haifa residential building	A ballistic missile struck a residential building in Haifa, injuring two Israeli civilians.
Northern District	A ballistic missile was intercepted, but struck the Northern District, causing minor damage.
Petah Tikva building	Four people were killed when a missile hit a 20-story building in Petah Tikva during the early hours of June 16. One of the victims was identified as Ivette Shmilovitz, a Holocaust survivor.
Bnei Brak, Israel	One person was killed in a missile attack on Bnei Brak.
Tel Aviv, Israel	Two missiles reportedly hit Tel Aviv on June 16, causing "some injuries" and significant material damage.
Financial district in Ramat Gan	The financial district in Ramat Gan was hit on June 19. Two people were seriously injured and at least 20 suffered lesser injuries. Material damage was substantial.
Holon residential buildings	A missile strike on June 19 hit a complex of multi-story residential buildings in Holon. At least 16 people were injured, four of them seriously.
Beit She'an	A residential building was struck by a UAV on June 21.
multiple locations including Tel Aviv, Haifa and Ness Ziona.	On June 22, 40 Iranian missiles were launched at Tel Aviv, the town of Ness Ziona and Haifa. No deaths were reported, but 86 people were injured.
Beersheba	On June 24 at 5:40 a.m. (Israeli time) an Iranian missile hit a residential building in Beersheba. 4 people were killed and 20 injured. Further missiles continued to hit Israel, but without causing fatalities, until 7:10 a.m. (Israel claimed one of them was launched from Iran later than 7:00 a.m. Israeli time; Iran denied this). (Note: Israel claimed one of the missiles not only landed after 7:00 a.m. but was also launched after 7:00 a.m.; Iran denied this. Israel later stated that the ceasefire had taken effect at 7:00 a.m. and was violated by Iran. A previous tweet by Trump appeared to put the start of the ceasefire at approximately 7:00 a.m. (around 1:00 am Israeli time, Trump posted that the ceasefire would start in "approximately" 6h "when Israel and Iran have wound down and completed their in progress, final missions"). At 7:30 a.m. Israeli time the Iranian state media said the ceasefire is now in effect, around 8:00 a.m. Donald Trump tweeted that the "ceasefire is now in effect", which after 09:00 a.m. was followed by an official Israeli statement that the ceasefire is accepted.)

== Operation Midnight Hammer ==
On 22 June 2025, the United States conducted Operation Midnight Hammer, which involved airstrikes on three Iranian nuclear facilities.

Operation Midnight Hammer attacks on Iranian nuclear facilities
Airstrike target	Damage information
Fordow Uranium Enrichment Plant	United States Department of Defense claims "severe damage".
Natanz Nuclear Facility	United States Department of Defense claims "severe damage".
Isfahan Nuclear Technology/Research Center	United States Department of Defense claims "severe damage".

== Operation Glad Tidings of Victory ==
Iran responded to Operation Midnight Hammer by attacking U.S. bases in Iraq and Qatar as part of Operation Glad Tidings of Victory.

== Attacks by Houthis on Israel ==
Target	Damage
Sa'ir, West Bank	The Houthis in Yemen launched a ballistic missile at Sa'ir in the West Bank, which injured five Palestinians, including three children.

== Maps ==
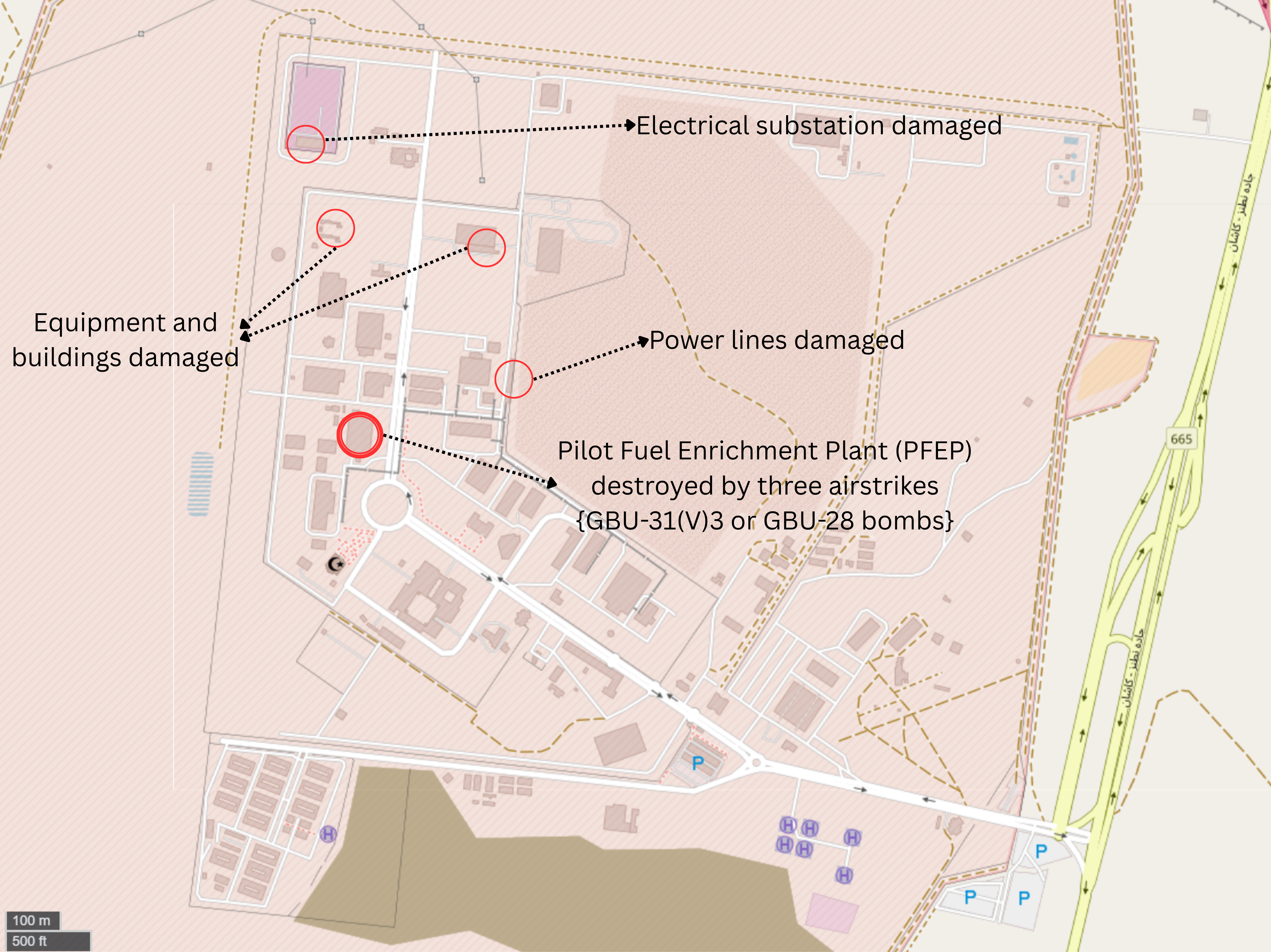
Israeli airstrikes on the Natanz Nuclear Facility

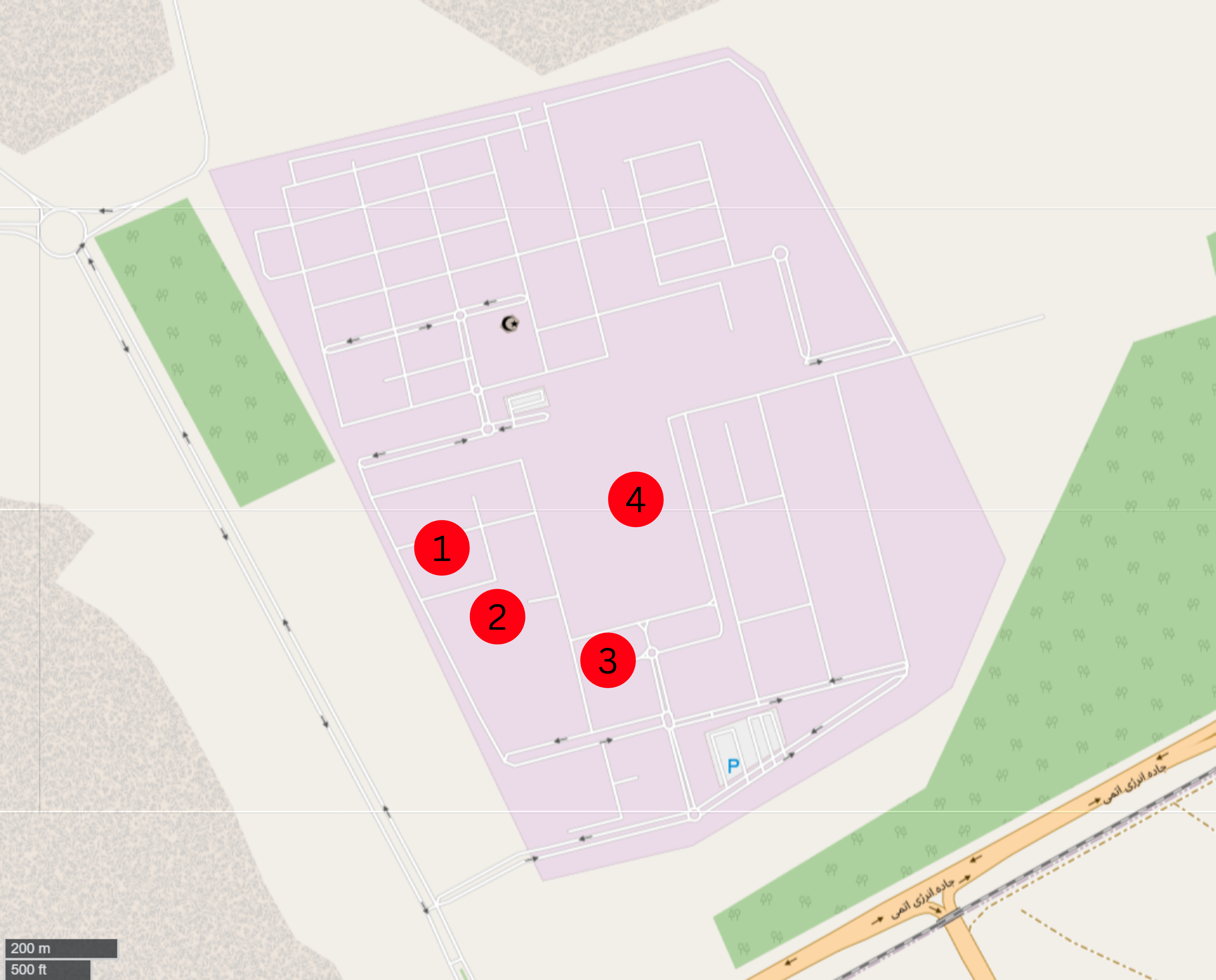
Israeli airstrikes on the Esfahan Nuclear Technology Center

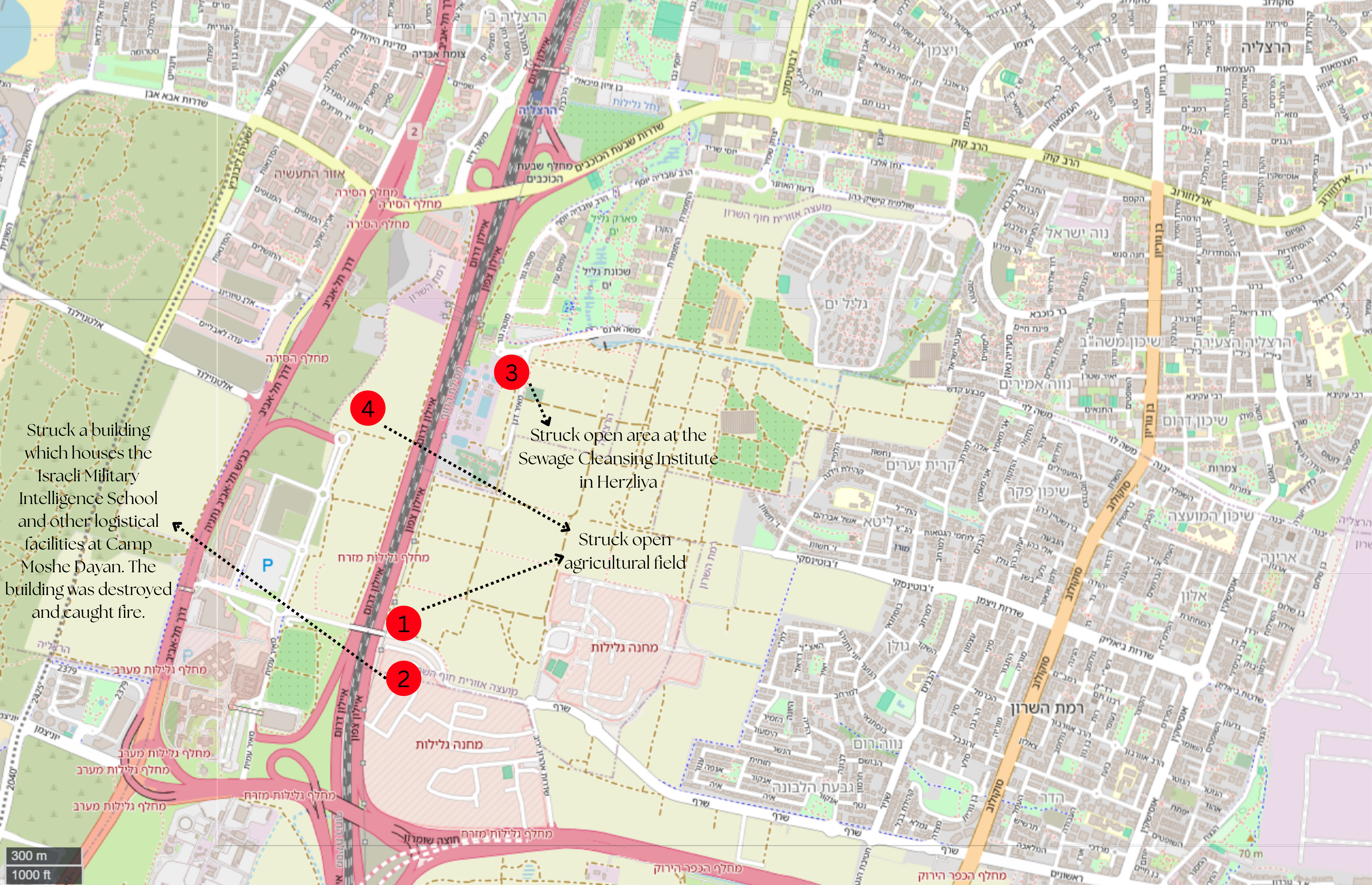
Iranian bombardment against the Israeli Military Intelligence School

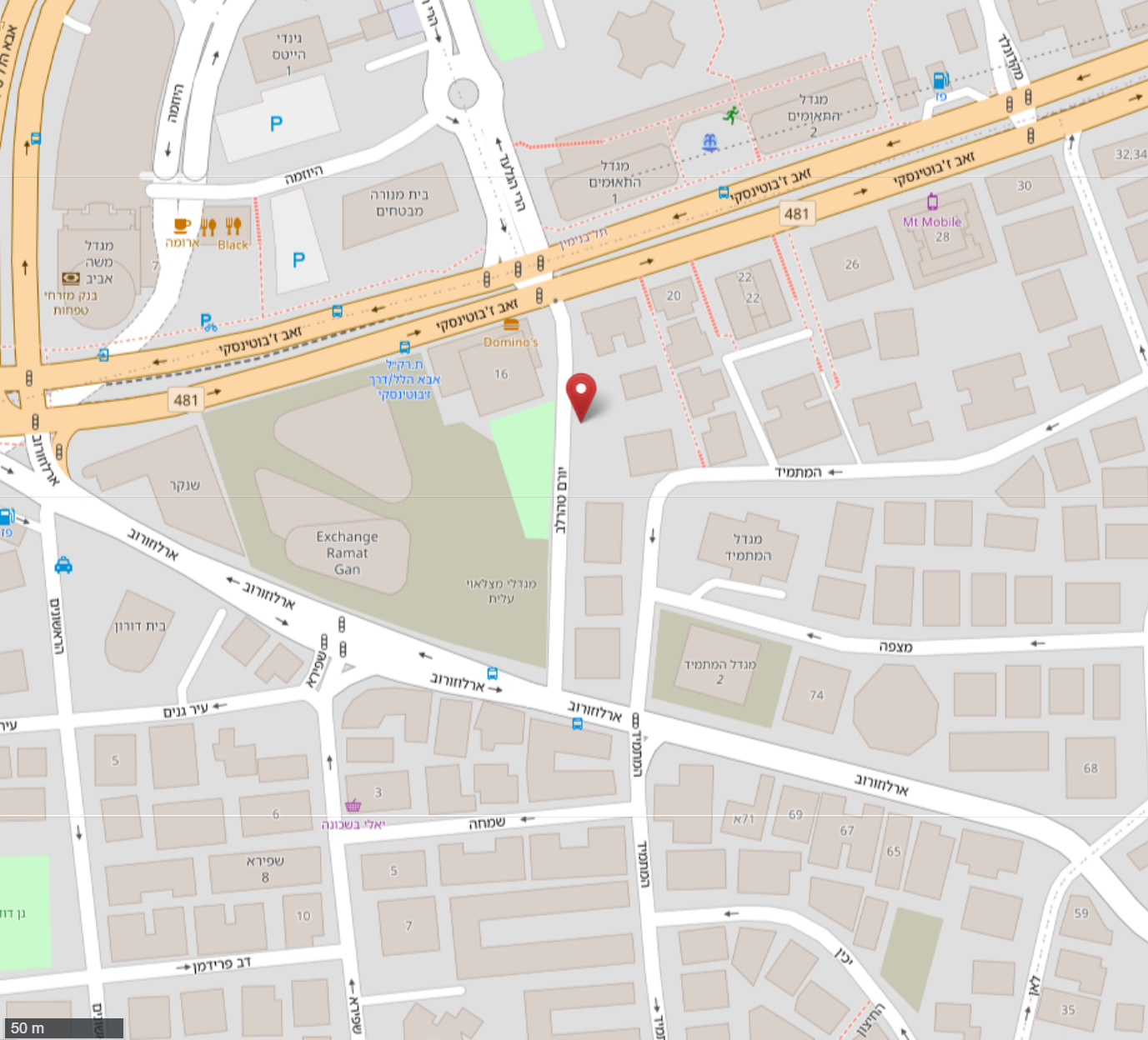
Iranian missile strike against Israeli civilians in Ramat Gan

== See also ==
- Casualties of the Twelve-Day War
