= October 2024 Israeli strikes on Iran =

Operation Days of Repentance

Operation Days of Repentance
- Part of the 2024 Iran–Israel conflict and the Middle Eastern crisis (2023–present)
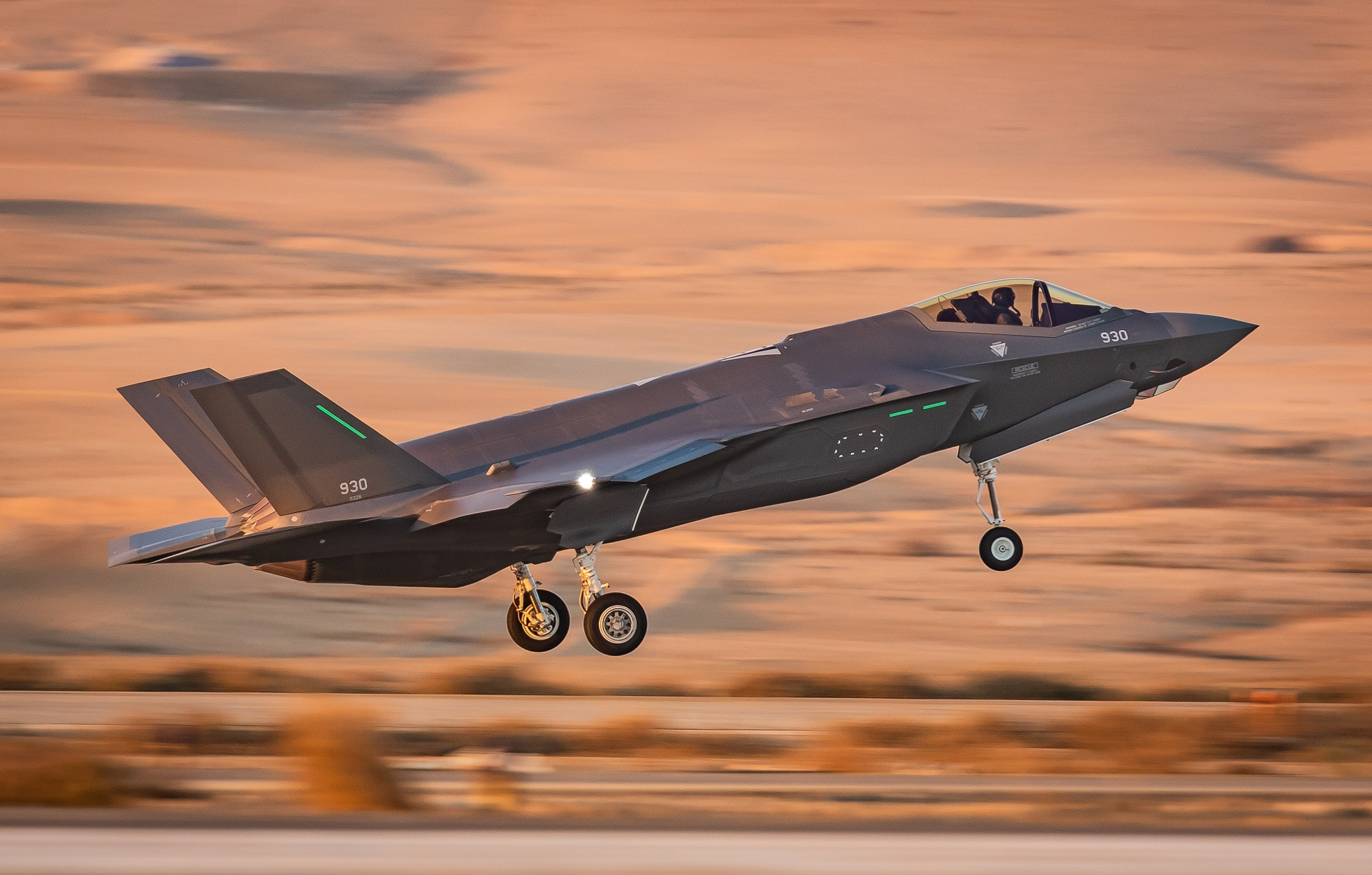
- An Israeli F-35I "Adir", the model of aircraft reported to have taken part in the strikes
- Type: Missile strike
- Location: Iran, Iraq, Syria
- Planned by: Israel
- Target: See § Locations
- Date: 26 October 2024
- Executed by: Israeli Air Force
- Outcome: Per US and Israel: Iran's missile production capability crippled and air defense network heavily damaged; All of Iran's long-range surface-to-air missile batteries and long-range detection radars destroyed; An active nuclear weapons research facility in Parchin destroyed; Per Iran: Minor to moderate damage to Iran's military infrastructure
- Casualties: Total: 5 killed 4 Iranian Army officers killed 1 Iranian security guard killed

On 26 October 2024, Israel launched three waves of strikes against 20 locations in Iran and other locations in Iraq, and Syria, codenamed Operation Days of Repentance (Hebrew: מבצע ימי תשובה) by Israel. It was the largest attack on Iran since the Iran–Iraq War. Israel said the strikes were launched in response to the Iranian strikes against Israel earlier that month.

Israel informed Iran a few hours ahead of the attack what would be targeted, and warned Iran against responding. According to the Israeli military, the strikes targeted Iranian military sites, including air-defense batteries, a UAV factory, and missile production facilities, with all Israeli aircraft returning safely. The Israeli attack involved over 100 aircraft, including F-35 Lightning II stealth fighters, traveling 2,000 kilometres (1,200 mi) and using heavy munitions. Some of the aircraft breached Iranian airspace. A preceding attack on Syria reportedly targeted radar defenses. An Iranian news agency associated with the Islamic Revolutionary Guard Corps (IRGC) reported that military installations in western and southwestern Tehran, as well as bases in the Ilam and Khuzestan provinces, were attacked. Four Iranian Army soldiers were reportedly killed. An Israeli official said that following the strikes targeting Iranian air defence and ballistic missile sites, Israel could now operate with greater freedom in Iranian airspace.

The IDF stated it has completed "precise and targeted strikes" in response to "months of continuous attacks" from Iran and its proxies, as well as a recent barrage of Iranian missiles on Israel on 1 October. US officials confirmed that the US was briefed in advance but did not participate in the operation. Following the attack Iran imposed military censorship over its damaged sites.

According to a U.S. assessment, the strikes crippled Iran's missile production capability, estimating it would take at least a year for Iran to rebuild the destroyed components necessary to resume production. U.S. and Israeli officials said that most of Iran's air defense network, including nearly all of its advanced S-300 systems, were destroyed, paving the way for potential future Israeli strikes.

== Background ==
=== Earlier skirmishes ===
Iran and Israel have been engaged in a covert conflict for years. Iran has utilized the "Axis of Resistance", a network of Iranian-backed militant groups, to target Israeli interests, while Israel has reportedly carried out assassinations of high-ranking Iranian officials and nuclear scientists and launched cyberattacks against Iran. Israel views Iran as its primary threat due to the Iranian leadership's rhetoric advocating for Israel's destruction, their backing of militant organizations, and the nation's nuclear program. Tensions between the countries have escalated further following Hamas-led October 7 attack on Israel. Following the attack, factions within the "Axis of Resistance," notably Hezbollah in Lebanon and Yemen's Houthi movement, launched assaults on Israel and Red Sea shipping, triggering the Hezbollah-Israel conflict and the Red Sea Crisis. Iran has poured considerable resources into bolstering these groups’ military capabilities and fostering cohesion, aiming for a coordinated Axis effort to dismantle the Jewish state in any large-scale confrontation with Israel.

On 1 April 2024, Israel bombed a consular building in the Iranian embassy complex in Damascus, Syria. The attack killed 16 people, including multiple Iranian officers and proxy fighters. Most notably, Mohammad Reza Zahedi, a commander for the Quds Force, was killed in the airstrike. Iranian officials in the building were allegedly meeting with Palestinian militant leaders at the time of the attack. In response, Iran and its proxies struck Israel on 13 April, targeting military bases. On 19 April, Israel struck an air defense facility in Isfahan, Iran in retaliation. The strikes were limited and de-escalated tensions.

On 31 July, Ismail Haniyeh, the political leader of Hamas, was assassinated in the Iranian capital Tehran by an apparent Israeli attack. Iran vowed to retaliate.

On 17 September, Israel adopted a new war goal: to return civilians displaced by Hezbollah back to their homes in northern Israel. Later that day and the next, thousands of communications devices (including pagers and walkie-talkies) exploded simultaneously across Lebanon and Syria, with Israel aiming to attack Hezbollah members. The attack killed 42 people. In response, Hezbollah launched rocket attacks on northern Israeli cities and towns, including Nazareth, on 22 September. On 23 September, Israel killed two of Hezbollah's top commanders, Ibrahim Aqil and Ahmed Wehbe, in Dahieh, south of Beirut. On 23 September, Israel began a series of strikes in southern Lebanon.

On 27 September, an Israeli airstrike in Dahieh killed Hassan Nasrallah, the secretary-general of Hezbollah. The attack also killed Ali Karaki, the Commander of Hezbollah's Southern Front and Abbas Nilforoushan, deputy commander of the IRGC and commander of the Quds Force in Lebanon.

In response to the killings of Haniyeh, Nilforoushan, and Nasrallah, Iran struck Israel, damaging military bases, in what was the largest attack of the 2024 Iran–Israel conflict. Israel said it had shot down most of the missiles and there had been no harm to its Air Force's capabilities. The US Navy and Jordan also reported intercepting missiles. The two fatalities caused by the attacks were a Palestinian man killed directly by missile debris and an Israeli man indirectly. Israeli Prime Minister Benjamin Netanyahu called it a "big mistake" and vowed that Iran "will pay" for it.

According to US officials speaking anonymously, Israel assured the Biden administration it would refrain from targeting Iran's nuclear and oil facilities, focusing instead on military sites. With the 2024 United States presidential election nearing, American officials worried about being pulled into a wider Middle Eastern conflict. US President Joe Biden asked Netanyahu to plan a retaliation that would "deter further attacks against Israel while reducing risks of further escalation."

=== Leak of intelligence on the attack ===
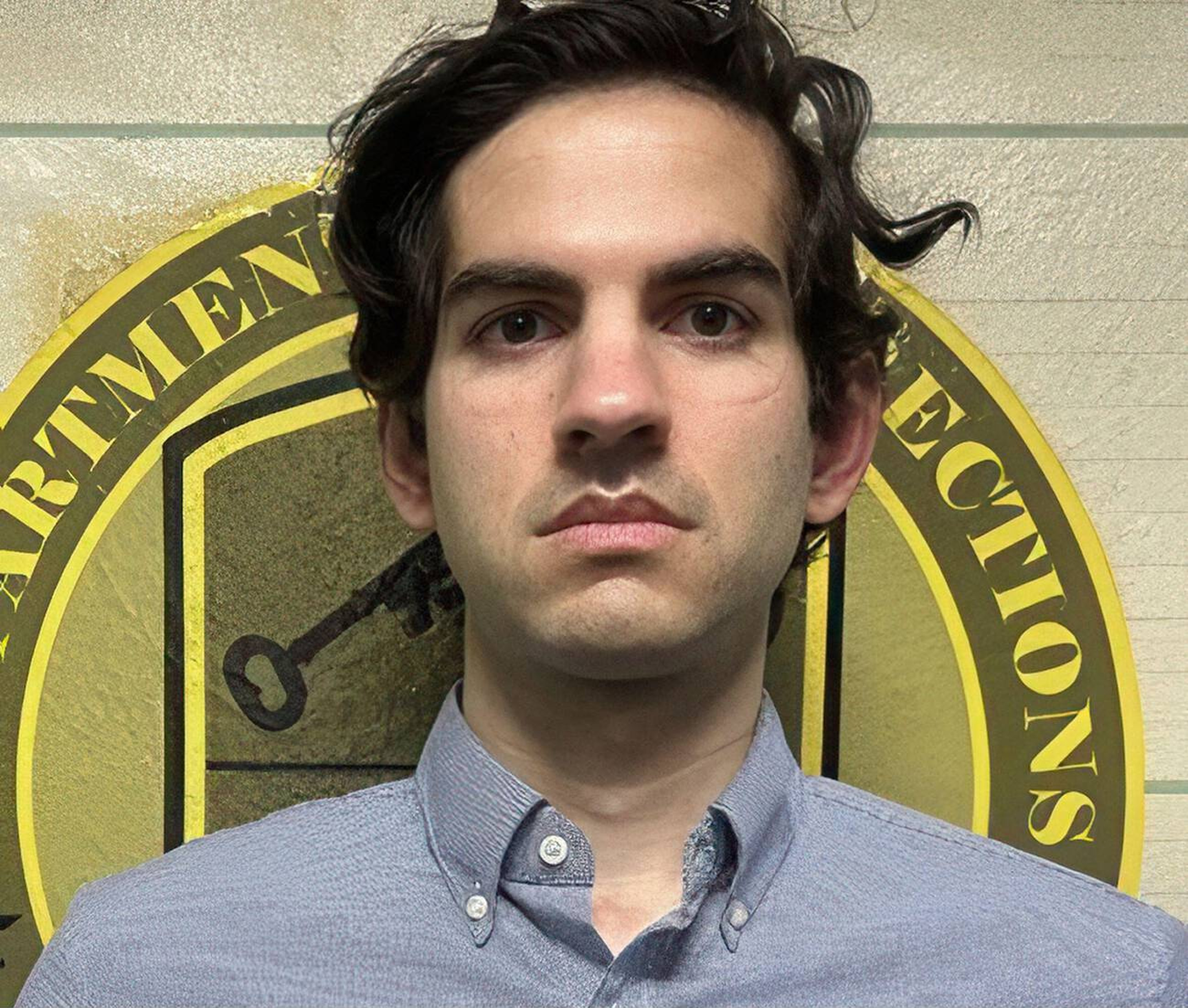
Guam Department of Corrections mugshot of leaker Asif Rahman

CIA analyst Asif Rahman leaked classified U.S. intelligence documents detailing Israel's preparations for a retaliatory strike against Iran to the Telegram channel Middle East Spectator, which disseminated them on 18 October 2024. The materials originated from the National Security Agency (NSA) and the National Geospatial-Intelligence Agency (NGA) and included satellite imagery analysis, Israeli Air Force exercise plans, drone strike routes, and the relocation of advanced munitions. One document referenced Israel's alleged possession of nuclear weapons, marking the first official U.S. acknowledgment of a capability long suspected by the international community but never confirmed by either government. The leak underscored close U.S. intelligence collaboration with Israel, including satellite surveillance of Israeli military activity, while exposing sensitive data shared within the Five Eyes alliance (FVEY).

Security officials confirmed the documents' authenticity, noting parallels to prior leaks by Jack Teixeira during the Russo-Ukrainian War. The breach drew condemnation from U.S. officials as a "deeply concerning" national security risk, while Israeli authorities privately acknowledged the severity of the compromise. Analysts warned of strained U.S.–Israel relations amid ongoing tensions with Iran and its proxies, citing risks to intelligence-sharing frameworks.

== Strikes ==
=== Locations ===
Operation Days of Repentance
Airstrike target	Damage information
Parchin military complex	Taleghan 2 nuclear weapons research facility destroyed
Parchin military complex	Twelve "planetary mixers" in three solid-propellant facilities struck
Khojir military complex	Damage to the military complex occurred
Imam Khomeini International Airport	One S-300 missile system destroyed
Shahroud Space Center	The IRGC Shahroud Missile Facility was damaged at the missile facility
Abadan Oil Refinery	Air defense site struck
Bandar Imam Khomeini Petrochemical Complex	Air defense site at the complex struck
Bandar Imam Khomeini Port	Air defense site at the port struck
Tang-eh Bijar Gas Field	Several air defense sites struck
Shamsabad Industrial City	The Taksaz Industrial Innovators Engineering Company (TIECO) factory was damaged
Ahvaz radar site	A Ghadir radar north of Ahvaz was destroyed
Ilam radar site	A Ghadir radar near Ilam was destroyed
Parand military complex	Damage to the military complex occurred from several drone strikes
Hazrat Amir Brigade Air Defense Site	One S-300 missile system destroyed at the air defense site

=== Timeline ===
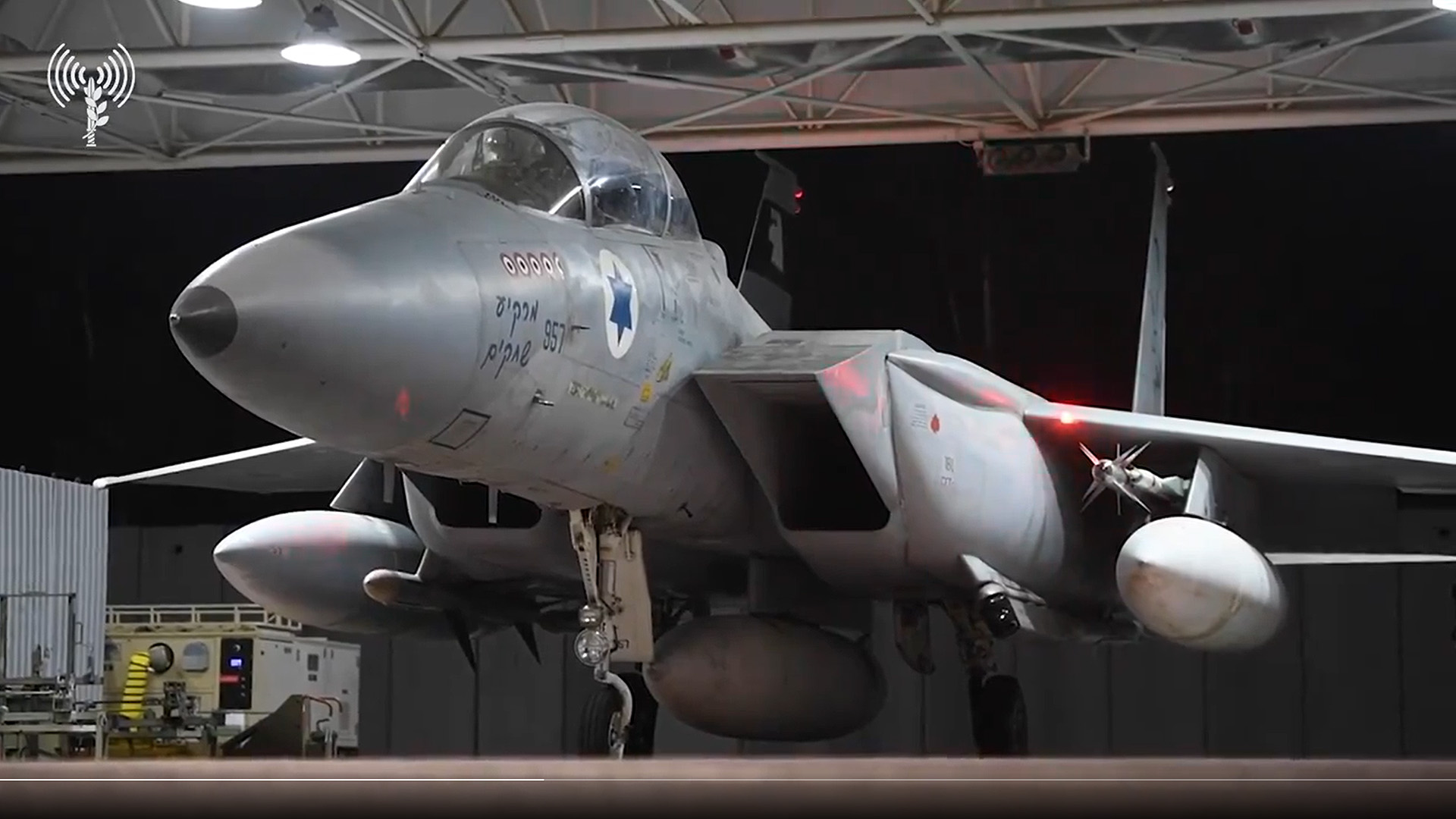
The F-15D Eagle Baz #957 at Tel Nof Airbase before the strike. This particular F-15 is well known for surviving and successfully landing after a mid-air collision in 1983 that resulted in the loss of a wing.

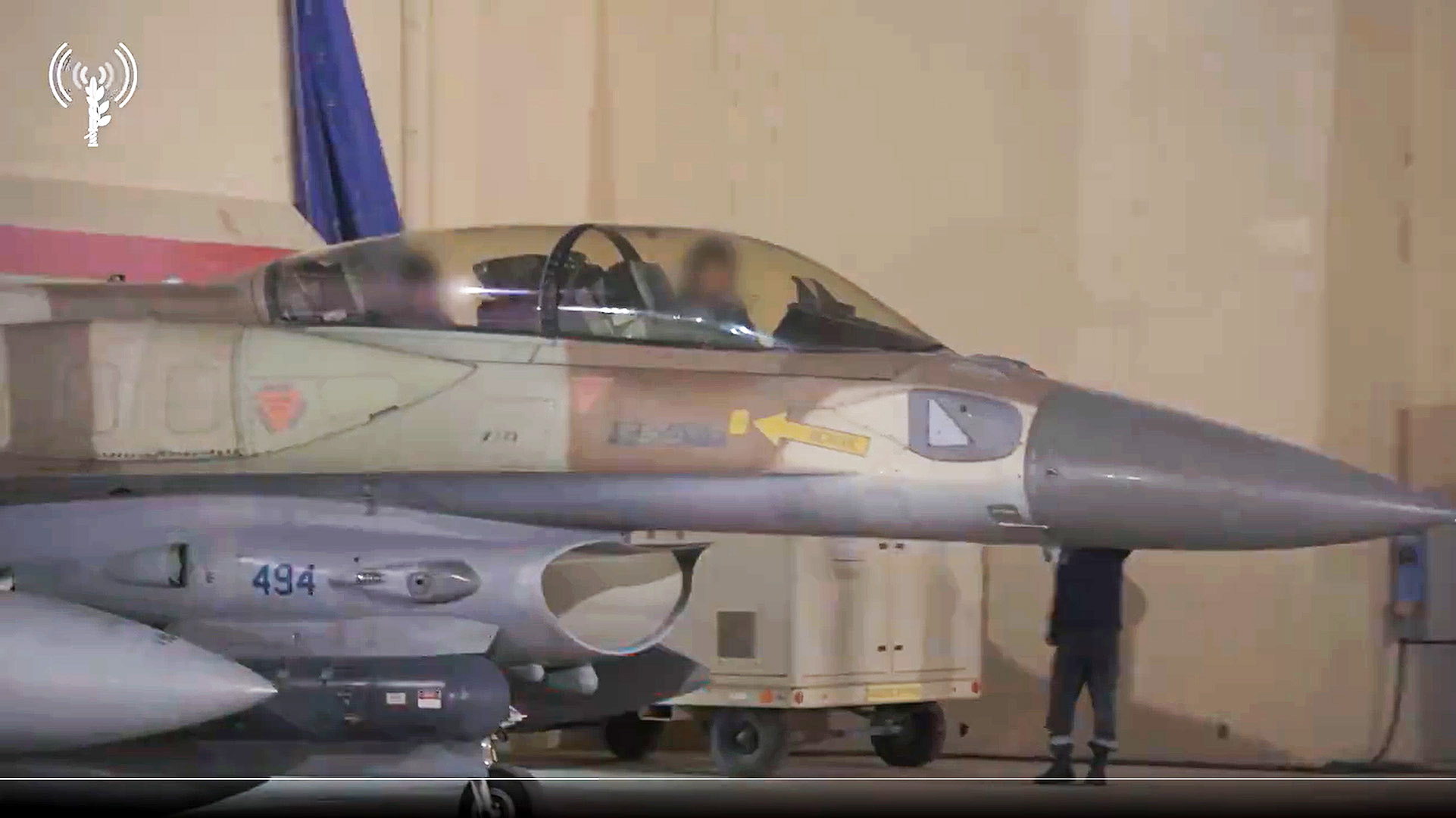
An F-16I Sufa at Ramon Airbase prepares for the strike.

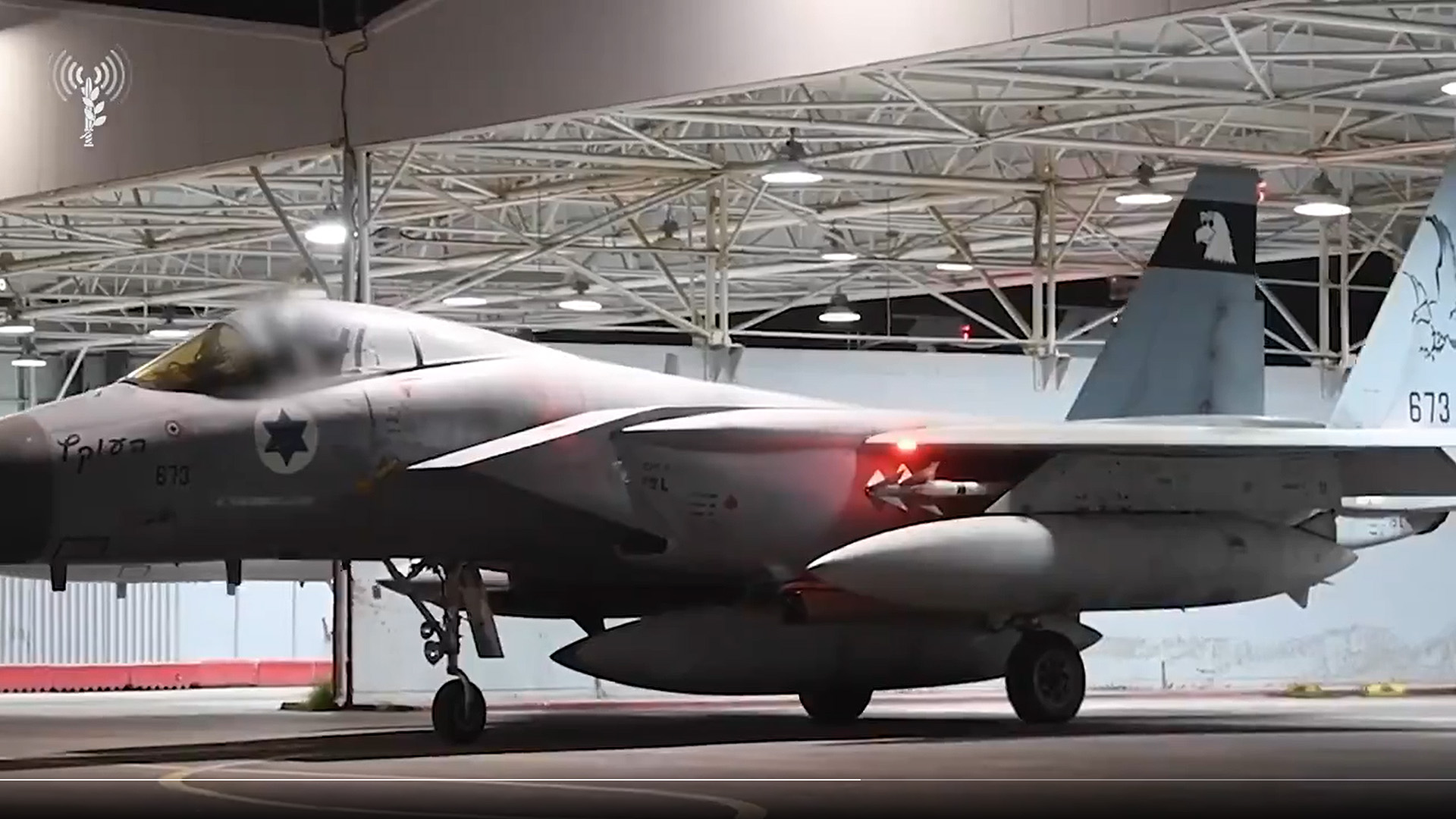
An F-15C Eagle Baz at Tel Nof Airbase before the strike

In the early hours of 26 October 2024, the Israel Defense Forces (IDF) began conducting airstrikes on military targets in Iran. The IDF stated that the strikes were conducted in response to the Iranian strikes against Israel on 1 October and due to militant actions by proxy members of the Axis of Resistance. Just prior to the attacks, Israel notified the United States' Biden administration about the impending attacks on Iran. The strikes continued through the night until dawn in Iran, marking Israel's first openly acknowledged attack on the country. This was the first time since the Iran–Iraq War (1980–1988) that Iran has faced such a prolonged assault from a foreign adversary.

The Jerusalem Post reported that over 100 aircraft, including F-35 Lightning II Adir stealth fighters from Nevatim Airbase, traveled roughly 2,000 kilometres (1,200 mi) for the attack, deploying heavy munitions with extensive refueling support and the IAF search and rescue force Unit 669 on standby. Some of the aircraft breached Iranian airspace. A preceding operation on radar sites in Syria prevented Iran from gaining intelligence on Israel's intentions. A video released by the IDF after the attack showed F-15C/D Eagle Baz jets from Tel Nof Airbase and an F-16I Sufa jet from Ramon Airbase preparing for it (see video stills to the right).

Beginning at 1:48 a.m. local time, sirens and alarms went off continuously for 30 minutes across the Ankawa neighborhood of Erbil, Iraq, with loudspeakers at Irbil airport's military base repeating the word "bunkers". Iranian State Television issued reports of explosion noises throughout Tehran. Two Arab officials stated that the attack had appeared to target a weapons depot and a military office or barracks. Explosions were also reported in the city of Karaj, located just west of Tehran, and near Imam Khomeini International Airport, Mashhad, Kermanshah, and Zanjan. Explosions were also heard near Damascus, Syria. Al Jazeera posted a video showing Iran's air defense activate in the skies of Tehran. Al Araby TV showed damage from Israeli strikes to a military drone factory in Shamsabad, south of Tehran. Iran later confirmed that strikes had also occurred in Ilam province and Khuzestan.

Yedioth Ahronoth reported that Israel had targeted an Iranian UAV factory as well as a secret base in Tehran. It was also reported that Russian made S-300 Iranian batteries as well as ballistic missile sites were attacked.

According to two Iranian officials, one affiliated with the IRGC, Israel's strikes in Tehran Province targeted key defense sites, including the S-300 air defense system at Imam Khomeini International Airport, which helps protect the capital.

The officials reported that multiple IRGC missile bases were hit in the province, followed by a second wave of drone strikes targeting the Parchin military complex on Tehran's outskirts with one drone reportedly reaching the base. The latter site has long been cited by Israel as a site of suspected nuclear weapons-related activity, with the IAEA reportedly finding related evidence there in 2016. David Albright, a former U.N. nuclear weapons inspector, noted that commercial satellite images, though low resolution, indicated that three buildings in Parchin were damaged, including two involved in mixing solid fuel for ballistic missile engines.

Iranian outlets reported that two Islamic Revolutionary Guard Corps (IRGC) soldiers were killed. Images released by Fars News Agency showed that the soldiers belonged to Iran's Air Defense Force, suggesting that SAM systems were targeted, possibly increasing Iran's vulnerability to future attacks.

According to U.S. officials, Israel targeted critical components of Iran's ballistic missile infrastructure, destroying 12 planetary mixers essential for producing solid-fuel missiles. Thus crippling Iran's capability to replenish its missile stockpile. U.S. officials added that it would take Iran at least a year to resume its missile production. U.S. and Israeli officials said that most of Iran's air defense network, including nearly all of its advanced S-300 systems, were destroyed. Paving the way for potential future Israeli strikes which could be aimed at Iran's nuclear program or its oil infrastructure.

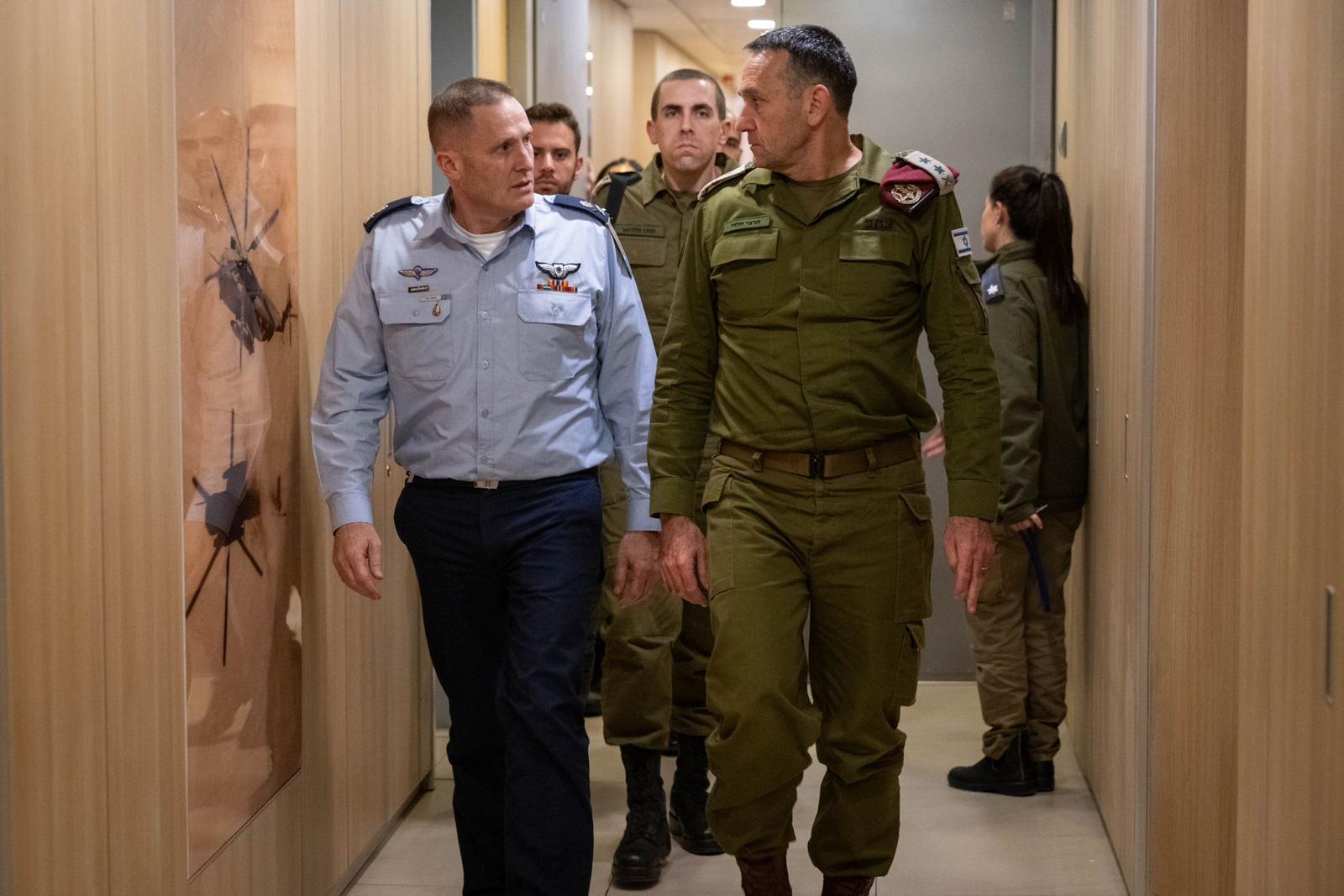
Tomer Bar (left), IAF Commander and Herzi Halevi (right), IDF Chief of General Staff, during the strikes

A female F-16I navigator (WSO) after the strike

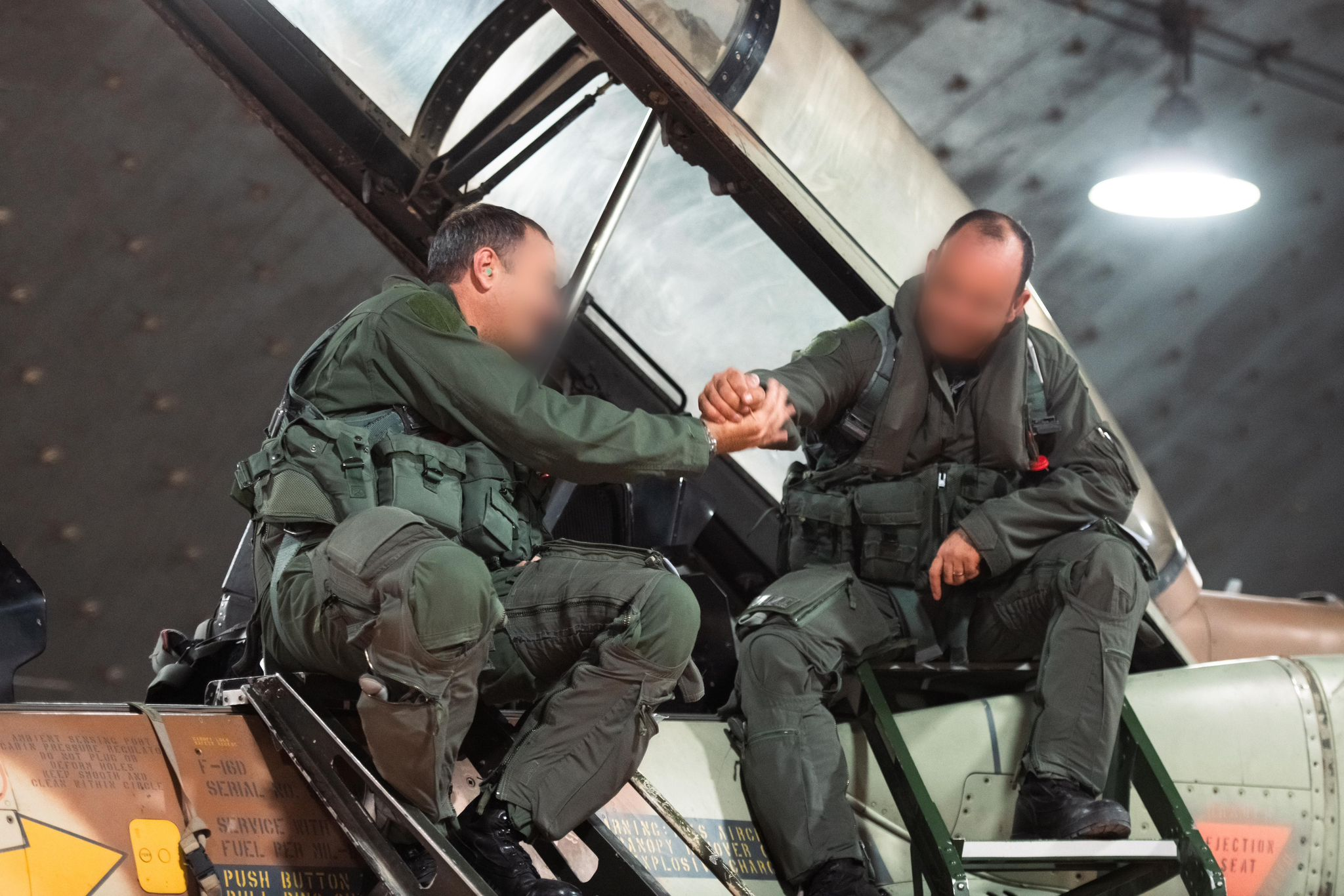
Mission accomplished, an F-16I pilot and his navigator (WSO)

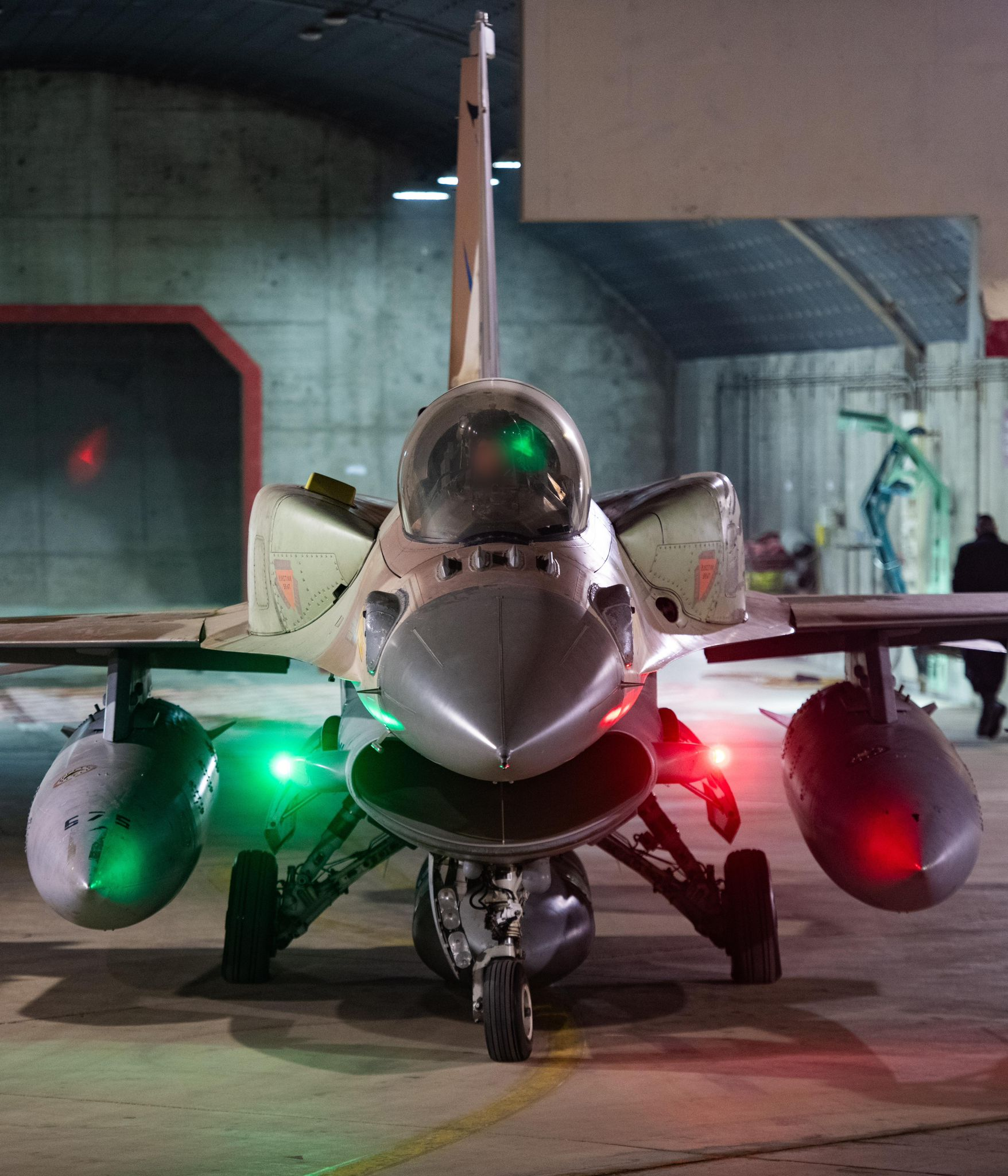
An F-16I Sufa after the strike at Ramon Airbase – with five external fuel tanks

== Reactions ==
=== Israel ===
At 2:30 a.m., the Israel Defense Forces (IDF) announced it was "conducting precise strikes on military targets in Iran," citing over a year of attacks by Iran and its allies across the Middle East as the reason. According to The New York Times, this statement marked a rare Israeli acknowledgment of military operations within Iranian territory. IDF spokesperson Daniel Hagari said Israel selected these sites from a "broad target bank", and that it would be able to "select additional targets from it and strike them if required", adding that "this is a clear message—those who threaten the State of Israel will pay a heavy price." By around 5 a.m., Israeli officials confirmed that the operation had concluded, with 20 targets struck. The IDF's statement at 6 a.m. confirmed the end of the strikes.

A day after the airstrikes, during a memorial for the victims of the October 7 attacks, Prime Minister Benjamin Netanyahu stated, "We have severely struck [Iran's] defense capabilities and its ability to produce missiles," adding that "the attack on Iran was precise and powerful, achieving all its objectives."

An official from the IDF indicated to Axios that thanks to the attack, Israel now enjoys greater freedom of operation over Iran, in part due to Israel having hit Iranian air defences as well as Iran's ballistic missile infrastructure.

=== Iran ===
State media confirmed that explosions were heard in Tehran, attributing some of the sounds to air defense systems in the area. However, state television provided no further details for several hours, only briefly mentioning the attack. Reporters stationed throughout the capital presented scenes of normal life, including markets and traffic, suggesting stability after the attack. The IRGC-affiliated channel Tasnim dismissed the attacks as "weak", a response experts described to the BBC as typical for Iran in such situations.

Iranian civilians who spoke to The Daily Telegraph expressed concern over continued escalating violence between Israel and Iran. The Iranian government threatened to hand out prison sentences of up to 10 years to civilians who provide evidence on the Israeli airstrikes to media deemed "hostile" by the regime.

Foreign Minister Abbas Araghchi stated that Iran has "no limits" when it comes to defending its interests, territorial integrity, and its people. Iran's UN mission said that Israeli warplanes conducted the attacks via US-held Iraqi airspace, accusing the United States of being complicit in the incident.

Supreme Leader Ali Khamenei stated that "The evil perpetrated by the Zionist regime two nights ago must not be exaggerated or minimised." Following the attack, he opened a Hebrew X (formerly Twitter) account, posting a tweet in Hebrew stating that "The Zionist regime made a mistake and miscalculated regarding Iran. We will make it understand the power, capability, initiative, and determination of the Iranian nation." Shortly afterwards, the account was suspended.

In the days following the attack, reports emerged suggesting that Iran was preparing a significant retaliation. Iranian officials indicated that on October 28, Supreme Leader Khamenei directed the Supreme National Security Council to organize an attack on Israel. On October 31, Ali Fadavi, deputy commander of the IRGC, was quoted in Iranian media stating, "Iran's response to the Zionist aggression is definite," adding, "We have never left an aggression unanswered in 40 years. We are capable of destroying all that the Zionists possess with one operation." On the same day, Gholamhossein Mohammadi Golpayegani, head of the supreme leader's office, remarked that Iran would deliver "a fierce, tooth-breaking response" to Israel's "desperate action." According to Axios, intelligence assessments suggest Iran may launch the attack from Iraq, potentially before the US elections.

=== Axis of Resistance ===
- Hamas: The group said it strongly condemned "the Zionist aggression against the Islamic Republic of Iran, and the targeting of military sites in several provinces," adding it was "an escalation that threatens the security of the region."

=== International ===
==== Africa ====
- Algeria: The Ministry of Foreign Affairs condemned the military attacks and expressed solidarity with the Iranians.
- Sahrawi Arab Democratic Republic: The Ministry of Foreign Affairs condemned the attacks, describing them as violations of international legitimacy and praised Iran's defense capabilities for resisting the attack.
- Tunisia: The government issued a statement warning about the consequences of the attack, it also stated to the international community to "urgently assume its responsibilities to put an end to this reckless approach".

==== Asia ====
- Malaysia: The Ministry of Foreign Affairs described the strikes as a "clear violation" of international law and called for an "immediate cessation of hostilities".
- Pakistan: The Foreign Ministry stated that the attacks undermine any chance of peace and stability in the region, it also stated that Israel "bears full responsibility for the current cycle of escalation and expansion of the conflict in the region".

==== Europe ====
- France: The Foreign Ministry stated that all parties "must abstain from any escalation and action that could worsen the extremely tense context in the region."
- Germany: Chancellor Olaf Scholz stated on X that his message to Iran is that "massive escalating reactions must not continue. These must stop immediately. Only then can we open the possibility of a peaceful evolution in the Middle East."
- Russia: Foreign Ministry spokeswoman Maria Zakharova stated that she urges all parties to "exercise restraint, stop the violence and prevent events from developing into a catastrophic scenario."
- United Kingdom: Prime Minister Keir Starmer stated in a press conference: "I am clear that Israel has the right to defend itself against Iranian aggression and I am equally clear that we need to avoid further regional escalation and urge all sides to show restraint. Iran should not respond. We will continue to work with allies to de-escalate the situation across the region."

==== Middle East ====
- Bahrain: The Foreign Ministry has condemned the attack, urging an immediate ceasefire to protect civilians and reduce regional tensions.
- Egypt: The Foreign Ministry stated that it condemns all actions that threaten the security and stability of the Middle East.
- Iraq: The Prime Minister's office stated that Israel continues its aggressive policies and expansion of conflict in the region, employing blatant acts of aggression without deterrence. The presidency condemned the Israeli attack, stating it was a flagrant violation of international law and state sovereignty, while reaffirming Iraq's steadfast position against any form of escalation. Government spokesman Basim Alawadi stated that "the occupying Zionist entity continues its aggressive policies and widening the conflict in the region through blatant attacks that it carries out with impunity". Egyptair says it had suspended flights to Baghdad and Erbil.
- Jordan: The Foreign Ministry stated that the international community "must shoulder its responsibilities" and take immediate measures to stop the Israeli "aggression" on Gaza, the West Bank and Lebanon as a first step towards reducing the escalation".
- Kuwait: The Foreign Ministry condemned the attack, stating that the attack reflected the "policy of chaos pursued by the Israeli Occupation Forces through violating the sovereignty of states".
- Oman: The Foreign Ministry condemned the strikes as a "blatant violation" of Iranian sovereignty.
- Qatar: The Foreign Ministry called the attacks a "violation of Iran's sovereignty and a clear breach of international law" and further stated that Qatar does not want to see more violence in the region.
- Saudi Arabia: The Foreign Ministry called the attack a "violation" of Iran's sovereignty and called on both parties to restraint.
- Ba'athist Syria: The Foreign Ministry expressed its solidarity with Iran, stating that Iran has the "legitimate right to defend itself and protect its territory and the lives of its citizens".
- Turkey: The Foreign Ministry condemned the attack, stating that Israel will bring the Middle East to a "wider war".
- United Arab Emirates: The Foreign Ministry condemned the targeting of Iran and expressed deep concern over the continued escalation and its impact on regional security and stability.

==== North America ====
- United States: An unnamed senior official from the Biden administration stated that the airstrikes seem to be a measured and deliberate response to earlier attacks from Iran, posing a minimal risk to civilian safety. National Security Council spokesman Sean Savett said that the Israeli strike "avoided populated areas ... contrary to Iran's attack against Israel that targeted Israel's most populous city." He added that the US urges Iran to stop attacking Israel, "so that this cycle of fighting can end without further escalation."

==== Supranational ====
- United Nations: Secretary-General António Guterres said he was "deeply alarmed" by the escalation in the region.

=== Analysis ===
Reactions to Iran-Israel war: Countries that condemned the Israeli attack. Countries that expressed concern. Countries that supported Israel.

Defense expert Malcolm Davis told CNN that although Israel's attack was "limited" and "precise," it was "certainly embarrassing" for Iran. He suggested that Iran might hesitate to retaliate, as doing so could provoke Israel to target its nuclear and oil facilities, or even members of Tehran's leadership. Therefore, he argued, Iran may find it wiser to "take this hit and back down."

Iranian-born writer Arash Azizi reported that many Iranians felt "mostly relieved" as Israel's strikes avoided civilian infrastructure like oil refineries, power, and water facilities, as well as political and military officials.

Behnam Ben Taleblu, a Senior Fellow at the Foundation for Defense of Democracies (FDD), observed that Iran appears to be minimizing the impact of the Israeli strike. Iranian state media has refrained from reporting any damage, a move that Taleblu suggests is aimed at controlling public perception and helping the regime maintain its image internally. Jonathan Conricus, also a Senior Fellow at the Foundation for Defense of Democracies, stated that while a comprehensive assessment will depend on satellite analysis in the coming days, it is possible that "Tehran, with all of its regime targets and sensitive infrastructure, might now be totally exposed to future Israeli strikes."

Con Coughlin wrote in The Telegraph that the Israeli strikes on Iran "could ultimately prove to be the final nail in the Islamic Republic's coffin." He pointed out that the ease with which Iran's air defenses were breached indicates that, despite the regime's substantial investments in military capabilities, it "is little more than a paper tiger." He also suggested that the regime is likely concerned about how ordinary Iranians will react, given severe economic issues such as 45% inflation and 25% youth unemployment. This situation raises questions among the Iranian public about "the wisdom of the regime investing so heavily in constructing its expansive terrorist infrastructure when ordinary civilians are struggling to make ends meet."

According to The Economist, the Israeli strikes "signalled the failure of Iran's national-security doctrine" that had been pursued for decades by current Supreme Leader Khamenei. He now faces a critical juncture regarding alternative strategies while contending with domestic dissatisfaction with his ideology-driven foreign policy, as evidenced by the popular protest slogan "not Gaza, not Lebanon, my life for Iran." The article states that Khamenei's successor "will decide whether to continue a war of choice that has impoverished Iran for decades and now brought it under attack by an enemy state for the first time since the 1980s."

Steven Erlanger argued in an article for The New York Times that Iran faces a difficult choice: while retaliating against Israel risks escalation "when its economy is struggling, its allies are faltering, its military vulnerability is clear and its leadership succession is in play," holding back could suggest weakness to its allies—"badly weakened by the Israeli military's tough response since Oct. 7"—as well as to hardliners at home.

Zvika Klein, Editor-in-Chief of The Jerusalem Post, criticized the UAE, Saudi Arabia and Egypt for diplomatically supporting Israel in the context of Israeli strikes on an Iranian base. These nations emphasized "sovereignty" and "de-escalation" while refraining from condemning Israel. Instead, they highlighted the broader risks to regional stability. Klein pointed out that while the UAE condemned the military targeting of Iran, it urged for "utmost self-restraint." However, the UAE's statements avoided direct criticism of Israel, instead underscoring "the importance of dialogue and adherence to international law." He concluded that the UAE was prioritizing diplomacy over confrontation in a move to strengthen its ties with Israel through the Abraham Accords.
