= 1983 Negev mid-air collision =

Collision between two Israeli Air Force aircraft

Occurrence
- Date: 1 May 1983
- Summary: Mid-air collision
- Site: Negev, Israel; 30.8467°N 34.8478°E
- Total fatalities: 0
- Total survivors: 3

First aircraft
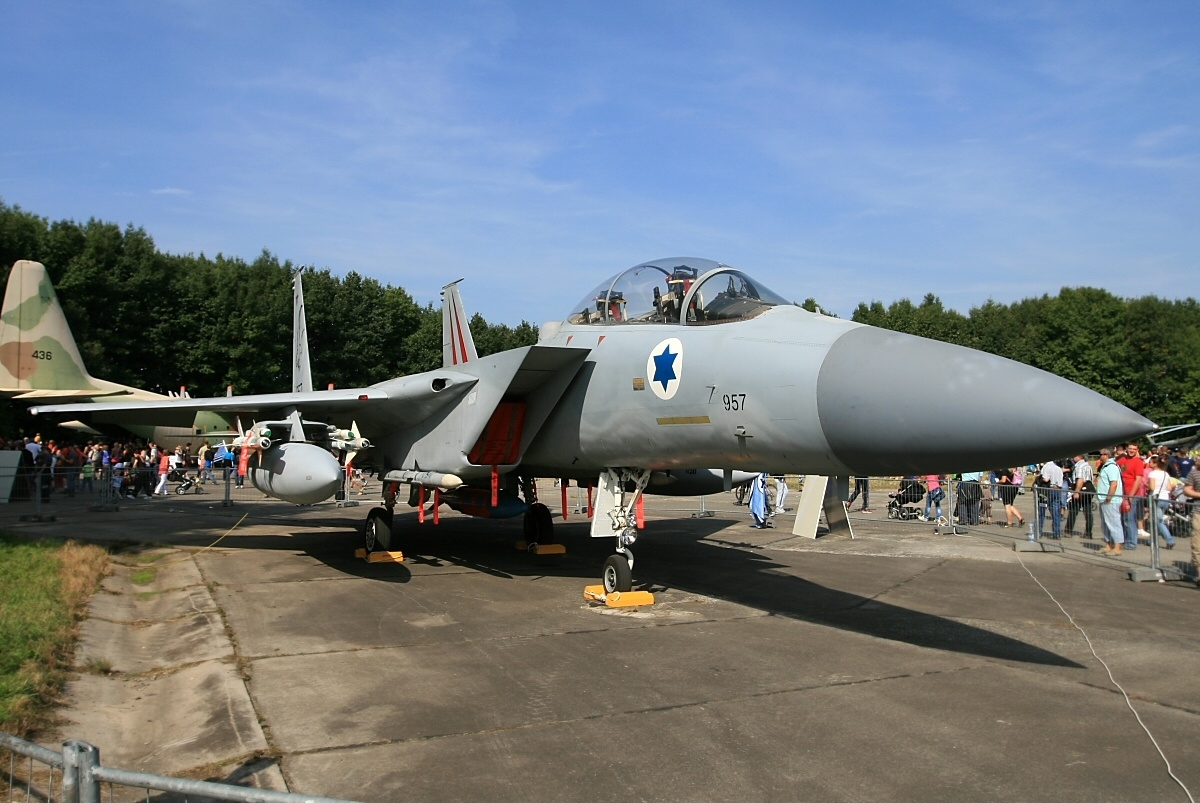
- The Israeli Air Force F-15D Baz #957 involved in the incident, seen here in 2011
- Type: McDonnell Douglas F-15D Eagle
- Name: Markia Schakim
- Operator: 106 Squadron Israeli Air Force
- Registration: 957
- Flight origin: Tel Nof Airbase
- Crew: 2
- Fatalities: 0
- Survivors: 2

Second aircraft
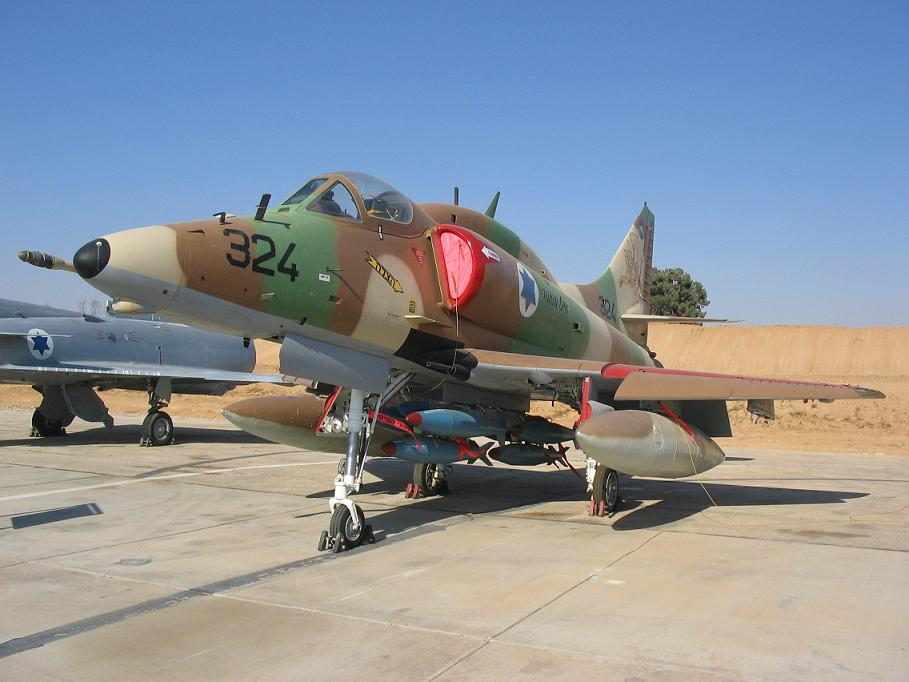
- An Israeli Air Force A-4 Skyhawk similar to the one involved
- Type: Douglas A-4 Skyhawk
- Operator: 116 Squadron Israeli Air Force
- Registration: 374
- Flight origin: Nevatim Airbase
- Crew: 1
- Fatalities: 0
- Survivors: 1

In May 1983, two Israeli Air Force aircraft, an F-15 Eagle and an A-4 Skyhawk, collided in mid-air during a training exercise over the Negev region, in Israel. Notably, the F-15 (with a crew of two) managed to land safely at a nearby airbase, despite having its right wing almost completely sheared off in the collision. The lifting body properties of the F-15, together with its overabundant engine thrust, allowed the pilot to achieve this unique feat.

== Accident ==
On 1 May 1983, during an Israeli Air Force dissimilar air combat training session over the Negev, an F-15D Eagle (called Baz (Falcon) by the Israelis) collided with an A-4 Skyhawk. The pilot of the Skyhawk was automatically ejected and his aircraft disintegrated. The right wing of the Eagle was sheared off roughly 2 ft (60 cm) from the root. The crew of the two-seat training version F-15, pilot Zivi Nedivi and navigator Yehoar Gal, did not initially realize the extent of the damage, as fuel leaking profusely and vaporizing at the wing attachment was obscuring their view of the area where the wing once was.

The F-15 started rolling uncontrollably after the collision and the instructor ordered an ejection. Nedivi, who outranked the instructor, decided not to eject and attempted recovery by engaging the afterburner, and eventually regained control of the aircraft. He was able to maintain control because of the lift generated by the large areas of the fuselage, stabilators, and remaining wing. Diverting to Ramon Airbase, the F-15 landed at twice the normal speed to maintain the necessary lift, and its tailhook was torn off completely during the landing. Nedivi managed to bring his F-15 to a complete stop approximately 20 ft (6 m) from the end of the runway. He later told The History Channel, "it's highly likely that if I had seen it clearly I would have ejected, because it was obvious you couldn't really fly an airplane like that." He added, "Only when McDonnell Douglas later went to analyze it, they said, OK, the F-15 has a very wide [lifting] body; you fly fast enough and you're like a rocket. You don't need wings."

== Aftermath ==
The aircraft, 106 Squadron's #957 Markia Schakim (Hebrew: מרקיע שחקים, Sky Blazer), was transported by road to an IAF maintenance unit at Tel Nof, where it was repaired. Having already claimed four enemy aircraft during the 1982 Lebanon War, the repaired aircraft was to claim a shared kill of another Syrian MiG-23 on November 19, 1985.

When Israel attacked Iran in retaliation on the night of 25-26 October 2024, this aircraft #957 was among those involved, with the aircraft being airworthy and fully operational more than 41 years after the accident. Footage of the aircraft was recorded for a video of the operation by the IDF. It formerly belonged to 106 Squadron "Spearhead", and as of 2024 is part of 133 Squadron "Knights Of The Twin Tail", with both squadrons based at Tel Nof (see different tail symbols below and the icon on the CFT added at some point on the right picture).

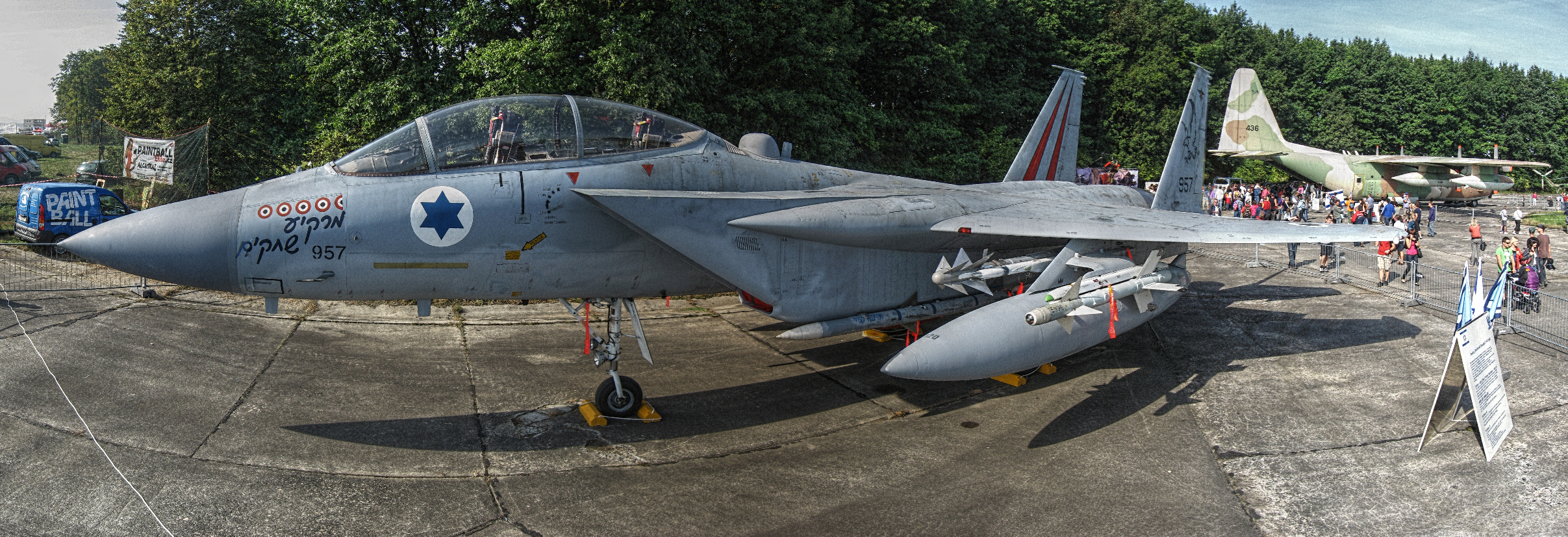
The F-15D Eagle Baz #957 at an exhibition in Ostrava, Czech Republic in 2011

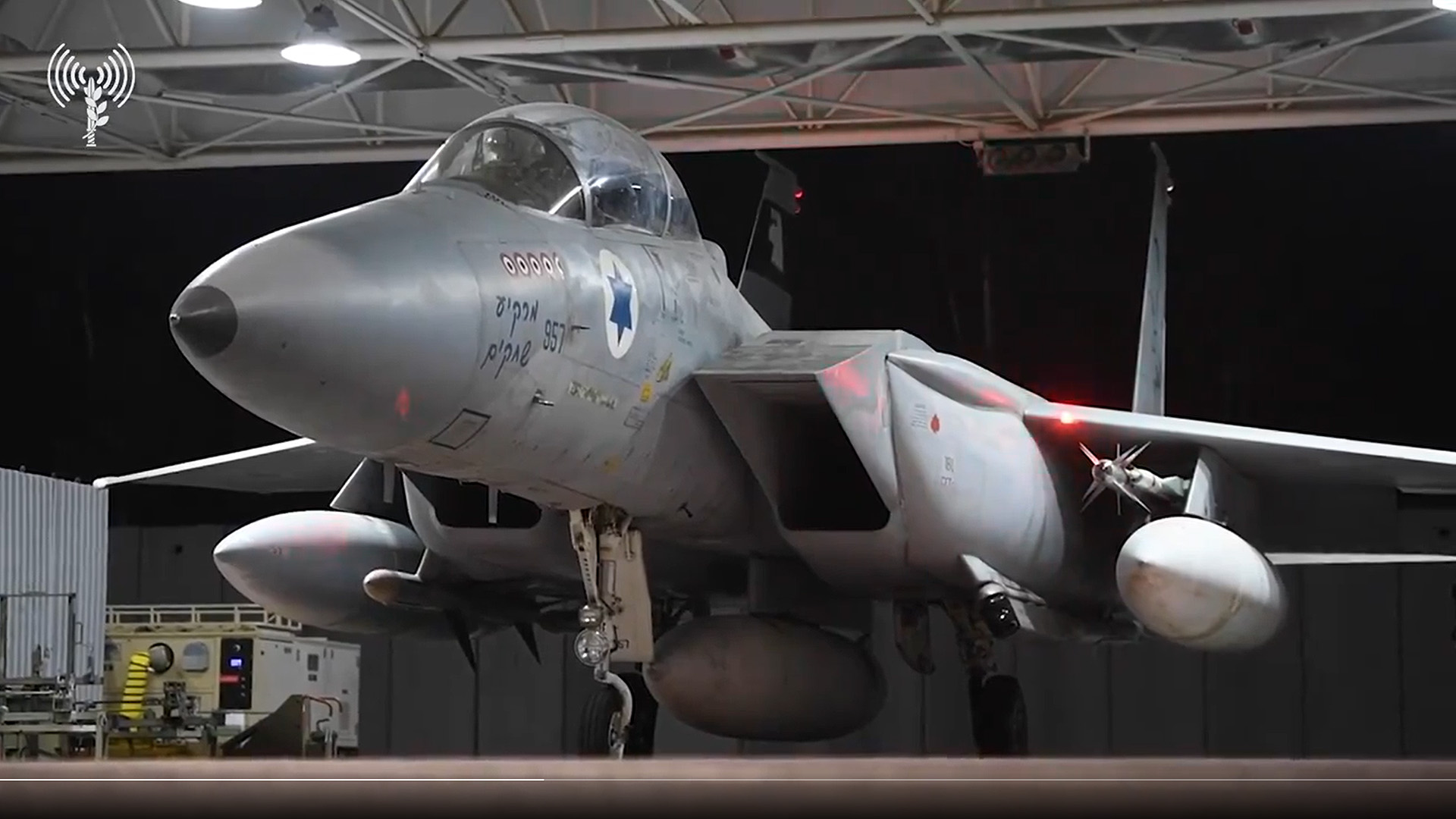
The F-15D Eagle Baz #957 before the Israeli strikes on Iran during the night of 25-26 October 2024

== In popular culture ==
The incident is referenced in the video game Ace Combat Zero: The Belkan War with the character of Larry Foulke, a mercenary pilot who managed to land his F-15C after losing one of the plane's wings during a sortie, which lead to him receiving the nickname of "Solo Wing Pixy" and the right wing of his aircraft being painted red.
