= Qom Ammunition Bunker =

Iranian military ammunition bunker

Coordinates: 34°53′35″N 50°48′05″E

- Qom, Qom province in Iran

Site information
- Owner: Islamic Republic of Iran Armed Forces
- Status: Destroyed

Site history
- Battles/wars: Twelve-Day War

The Qom Ammunition Bunker was an ammunition bunker used and operated by the Iranian Armed Forces. During the Twelve-Day War in June 2025, the bunker was destroyed by Israeli airstrikes.

== See also ==
- List of attacks during the Twelve-Day War
