= 106 Squadron (Israel) =

Israeli military unit

106th Squadron
- טייסת חוד החנית
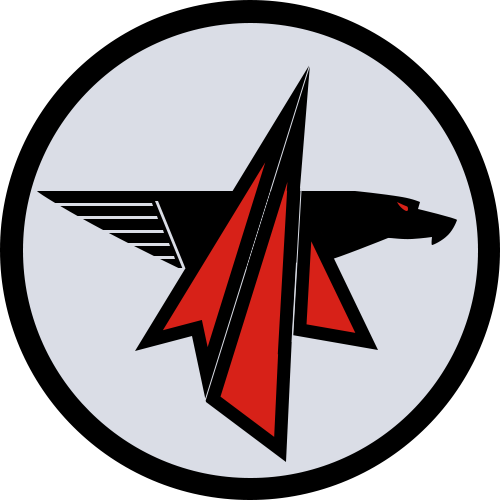
- The Spearhead logo
- Active: June 13, 1948 – June 1949; June 11, 1982–present
- Country: Israel
- Branch: Israeli Air Force
- Role: Air Defence
- Size: Squadron
- Garrison/HQ: Tel Nof Airbase
- Motto: The Second Eagle Squadron
- Engagements: Operation Balak; 1982 Lebanon War; 2026 Iran war

Aircraft flown
- Fighter: F-15B/C/D

106 Squadron of the Israeli Air Force, also known as Tip Of The Spear or Spearhead Squadron (Hebrew:טייסת חוד החנית), operates F-15B/C/D fighters out of Tel Nof Airbase.

== History ==
The squadron was created on June 13, 1948, for transportation purposes.

The squadron first operated transport aircraft such as the C-46 Commandos, L-049 Constellations and Douglas C-54 Skymaster. It flew under the cover of a fake airliner company called Lineas Aereas de Panama. It first participated in Operation Balak in 1948.

The squadron was disbanded in June 1949. The squadron's aircraft were transferred to an airliner company called Arkia Airlines.

It was reformed on June 11, 1982, and fought in the 1982 Lebanon War. Since the Lebanon War, the squadron is credited with five aerial victories from 1982 to 1985. The squadron's F-15s flew combat air patrols during Desert Storm to screen possible air attacks from the Iraqi Air Force.

In 1983 Negev mid-air collision, the squadron almost lost an aircraft.

== See also ==
- 1983 Negev mid-air collision
