= Mohammad Reza Seddighi Saber =

Iranian nuclear scientist

Seyyed Mohammad Reza Seddighi Saber
- سید محمدرضا صدیقی صابر
- Born: 24 August 1974; Niaku, Astaneh-ye Ashrafiyeh, Iran
- Died: 24 June 2025 (aged 50); Tehran, Iran
- Cause of death: Assassination by airstrike
- Occupations: Nuclear physicist; nuclear engineer

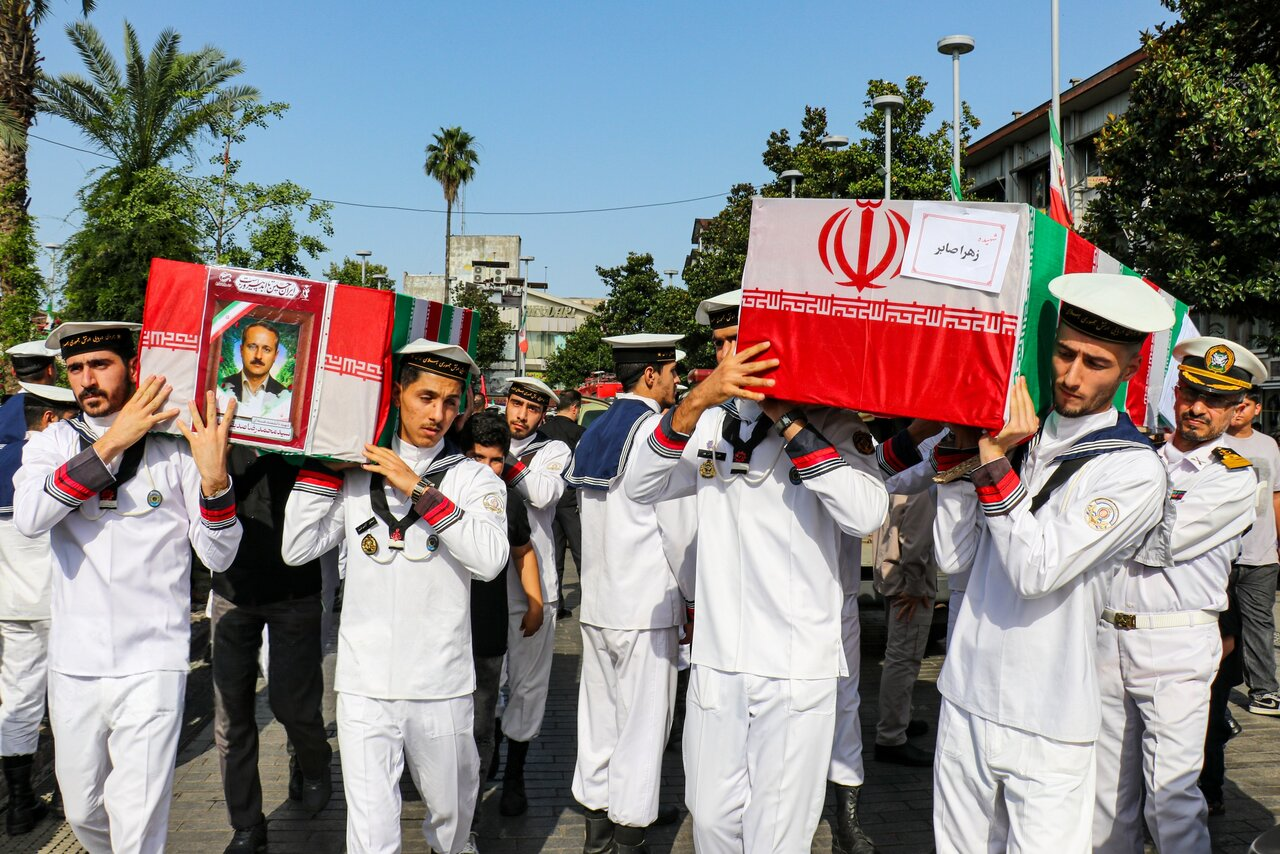
Funeral of Mohammad Reza Seddighi Saber

Seyyed Mohammad Reza Seddighi Saber (Persian: سید محمدرضا صدیقی صابر; 24 August 1974 – 24 June 2025) was an Iranian nuclear scientist who worked on the Iranian nuclear program.

== Career ==
Seddighi Saber was one of the active figures in Iran's research programs in the field of technologies related to the defense and nuclear industries, and some sources have mentioned him as an expert in the field of "sympathetic explosions" and explosives engineering. In May 2025, the US Treasury Department placed his name on the sanctions list, stating that he had played a role in developing the Islamic Republic's illegal capabilities.

== Death ==
On the morning of 24 June 2025 following an Israeli airstrike on his father's house in Astaneh-ye Ashrafiyeh, Seddiqi Saber was killed along with 11 other members of his family.

== See also ==
- Mansour Asgari
