= Issar Tabatabai Qomsheh =

Iranian nuclear scientist and professor (died 2025)

Sayyid Issar Tabatabaei Qomsheh
- سید ایثار طباطبایی قمشه
- Died: 21 June 2025; Tehran, Iran
- Cause of death: Assassination by airstrike
- Occupations: professor at Sharif University of Technology, a nuclear engineering specialist

Issar Tabatabaei Ghomsheh was an Iranian nuclear scientist and professor at Sharif University of Technology, a nuclear engineering specialist who was killed along with his wife during the Israeli attacks on Iran on 21 June 2025. He was involved in sensitive Iranian defense projects and was targeted by Israel due to his activities in Iran's nuclear program.

Issar Tabatabaei began his studies in mechanical engineering at Sharif University of Technology and received his master's degree in 2004. He then entered the PhD program in nuclear engineering at the same university in 2007.

== Death ==
In June 2025, Issar Tabatabaei Qomsheh and his wife, Mansoureh Hajisalem, were killed in an attack by Israel in their home in Tehran.
