= Kermanshah Underground Missile Facility =

Iranian underground missile base

- Kermanshah province in Iran

Site information
- Owner: Islamic Republic of Iran Armed Forces
- Operator: Islamic Revolutionary Guard Corps Aerospace Force
- Status: Partially destroyed

Site history
- Battles/wars: Twelve-Day War

The Kermanshah Underground Missile Facility (UGF) is an Iranian underground missile base operated by the Islamic Revolutionary Guard Corps Aerospace Force (IRGCASF), which houses two types of ballistic missiles: Qiam 1s and Fateh-110s.

== History ==
In June 2025, during the Twelve-Day War, the missile base was struck and destroyed by numerous Israeli airstrikes. The airstrikes "collapsed the facilities' entry points and silo openings". The Institute for the Study of War (ISW) confirmed "multiple missile storage buildings and vehicle tunnel entrances, which were likely used to store ballistic missiles and other related equipment" were damaged or destroyed. In total, ten locations at the Kermanshah Underground Missile Facility were struck by Israeli missiles.

== See also ==
- List of attacks during the Twelve-Day War
