= Mansour Asgari =

Iranian nuclear physicist (1958-2025)

- منصور عسگری
- Born: 3 June 1958
- Died: 13 June 2025 (aged 67); Tehran, Iran
- Cause of death: Assassination by airstrike
- Occupations: Nuclear physicist; nuclear engineer

Mansour Asgari (Persian: منصور عسگری; 13 June 1958 – 13 June 2025) was an Iranian nuclear physicist who was killed during the June 2025 Israeli strikes on Iran. He was sanctioned by the United States Treasury Department on March 22, 2019.

== Life and career ==
Mansour Asgari was a physics professor and faculty member at Imam Hussein University. He was a prominent figure in Iran's nuclear industry and a close associate of Mohsen Fakhrizadeh. Asgari was one of the founders of Iran's nuclear program and had a history of participating in the Iran-Iraq War. He held responsibilities such as membership in the Center for Physics Science and Technology, responsibility for the university's Center for Philosophy of Natural Sciences, cooperation with the Ministry of Defense, and representation of the ministry on the Supreme National Security Council.

== Death ==
Mansour Asgari was one of the individuals targeted and assassinated during the June 2025 Israeli strikes on Iran. He was killed on 13 June 2025, in his home, along with his wife, two children, and three-year-old grandson.

== See also ==
- Abdolhamid Minouchehr
- Amir Hossein Feghhi
- Mohammad Mehdi Tehranchi
- Seyyed Mohammad Reza Seddighi Saber
