= Parchin =

Military base in Tehran, Iran

- military base
- Location within Iran
- Coordinates: 35°31′38″N 51°46′40″E
- Country: Iran
- Province: Tehran
- Time zone: UTC+3:30 (IRST)
  - Summer (DST): UTC+4:30 (IRDT)

Parchin (Persian: پارچین) is an Iranian military complex, located about 30 kilometres (19 mi) southeast of Tehran. It is closely linked with the Khojir missile production complex. In June 2025, the complex was reportedly hit by military strikes.

== Geography ==
Parchin is located on the bank of the Jajrud (river).

== History ==
=== Founding ===
The Parchin Chemical and Explosives Factory was established by General Mahmud Mir-Djalali (grandfather of eBay founder Pierre Omidyar) and constructed by Skoda Works of Czechoslovakia in 1935 as part of the initiative to build a domestic Artillery and Tank production industry.

In November 1976, during the Shah era, Parchin was selected as the site for Iranian assembly of Rapier missiles. The project would later be cancelled.

Missile engines

To the northwest of Parchin in the Barjamali Hills, a test range for liquid-propellant missile engines is part of the Shahid Hemmat Industrial Group (SHIG) Khojir research facility 35°39′50″N 51°43′45″E where signature of engine test stand firing, probably including technology from the Russian SS-4 Sandal missile, was confirmed by an American spy satellite in August 1997.

On December 15, 1997, SHIG conducted at least a sixth 1997 test of an engine needed for an 800-mile-range (1,300 km) ballistic missile. The test was either the sixth or the eighth during 1997 according to available intelligence.

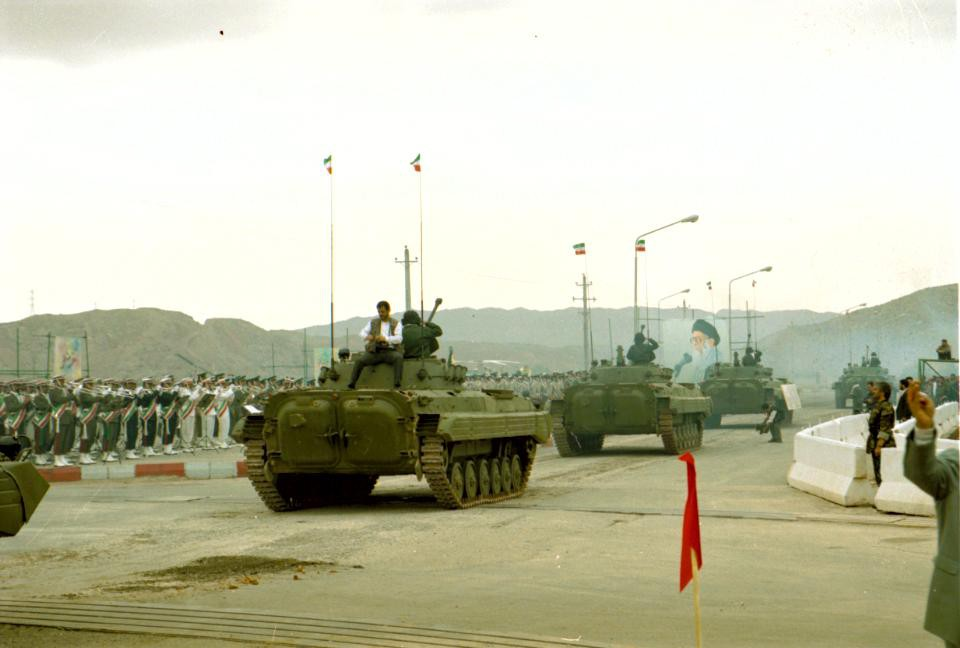
Parchin military complex in 1998

1997 wind tunnel

It is reported the Russian Central Aerohydrodynamic Institute TsAGI contracted in early 1997 to build a wind tunnel at SHIG, for both Iranian and Russian missile designers to refine the Shahab-3 missile.

2005 IAEA inspection

On January 13, 2005, International Atomic Energy Agency (IAEA) inspectors were allowed access to the Parchin military base as a confidence-building measure. The IAEA inspectors revisited the site in November 2005.

2007 explosion

In November 2007, an explosion occurred in a warehouse. Firefighters successfully extinguished the resulting fire. Four people were injured.

2011 reports of nuclear development

In late 2011, the IAEA said it had observed extensive landscaping, demolition and new construction at the site. In November 2011, the IAEA announced that it had credible information that Parchin was the site of activities aimed at developing a nuclear weapon. In February 2012 the IAEA then sought renewed access to Parchin, which was refused by Iran.

2012 calls for inspection

On 8 March 2012, the United States, the United Kingdom, France, Germany, Russia and China called on Iran to allow United Nations inspectors to visit the Parchin military site.

2014 explosion

In early October 2014, the New York Times reported on sabotage concerns arising from a blast that took place at the site. A "huge orange flash" was reportedly seen from Tehran. Two people died.

2015 claims of nuclear weapons programme

In July 2015, there were claims that there was activity in the military complex associated with nuclear weapons, but the mission for Iran in the United Nations stated that there is no nuclear weapon production on the site and that the reactivation is a misconception caused by road reconstruction opposite the Mamloo Dam, near the Parchin Military Complex. Iranian Foreign Minister Mohammad Javad Zarif claimed that the Institute for Science and International Security's analysis of satellite imagery were lies.

In August 2015, the IAEA announced that a small extension to an existing building seems to have been built in Parchin.

On 20 September 2015, Director-General Yukiya Amano of the IAEA went to Parchin, along with Director of Safeguards Tero Varjoranta, to obtain clarifications on the nuclear activities of the site. The next day, Amano professed satisfaction with the samples taken by the Iranians themselves and handed over to the IAEA under "established procedures". IAEA experts were not physically present during the sampling, but Amano said the procedure meets "strict agency criteria" that ensure "the integrity of the sampling process and the authenticity of the samples."

What follows is a verbatim quote of the IAEA report on the September 2015 visit to Parchin:

53. When the Director General and Deputy Director General for Safeguards visited the main building of interest to the Agency at the Parchin site on 20 September 2015, they did not observe a chamber or any associated equipment inside the building. They did observe, inter alia, recent signs of internal refurbishment, a floor with an unusual cross-section and a ventilation system which appeared incomplete.

54. Iran stated during discussions at technical-expert meetings under the Road-map that the building had always been used for the storage of chemical material for the production of explosives.

55. The Agency has analyzed the environmental samples. The Agency did not detect explosive compounds or their precursors that would have indicated that the building had been used for the long-term storage of chemicals for explosives. The results identified two particles that appear to be chemically man-modified particles of natural uranium. This small number of particles with such elemental composition and morphology is not sufficient to indicate a connection with the use of nuclear material.

56. Following the completion of the technical-expert meeting on 14 October 2015, in which Iran contested the Agency’s satellite imagery by showing an aerial photograph taken by Iran, the Agency acquired new satellite imagery from different sources, including a commercial source, which supported previous indications of the presence of a large cylindrical object at the location of interest to the Agency at the Parchin site in the summer of 2000.

57. The information available to the Agency, including the results of the sampling analysis and the satellite imagery, does not support Iran’s statements on the purpose of the building. As a result of activities implemented under the Road-map, the Agency has established that, as of 20 September 2015, the cylinder was not in the main building of interest. The Agency assesses that the extensive activities undertaken by Iran since February 2012 at the particular location of interest to the Agency seriously undermined the Agency’s ability to conduct effective verification.

2015 proof of nuclear weapons programme

In June 2016, IAEA investigators reported to the Wall Street Journal that they had found in December 2015 traces of uranium at the Parchin facility, establishing the first physical evidence of a nuclear weapons programme at the missile complex site.

26 June 2020 explosion

In the early morning of 26 June 2020, an explosion occurred close to the military base in Parchin. According to the Defense ministry spokesman Davoud Abdi, it was due to "a gas leak" at a "gas storage facility" near the base. In news that was released the next day by the Associated Press, Sentinel-2 satellite images show signs of a vast blackened area in the hills located next to the ammunitions facility and the cruise missile factory at Khojir missile base, which is evidence of an explosion and fire that lit up the night sky in Tehran. On 29 June, the New York Times accused the Iranian government of lying that the blast happened at Parchin, because satellite photographs show the explosion happened at the adjacent Khojir missile production facility.

26 October 2024 Israeli airstrikes

Parchin was reportedly among the sites targeted by Israel in its retaliatory strikes on Iran on the night of 26 October 2024 (Aban 5th 1403 in the Persian date). According to Iranian officials cited by The New York Times, Israeli drones targeted the base during the attack's second wave; several drones were intercepted and shot down, though one managed to strike the facility.

==== 2025 strikes ====
In June 2025, the complex was reportedly hit by military strikes.

==== 2025-6 upgrades ====
Satellite images show repairs and fortifications being added to the site (and others) in late 2025 and early 2026.

== Collaborations ==
There have been reports of collaborations between Parchin and Imam Hossein University.

== Sources ==
- Alirezaijan, Reza (2025). 'Škodovy závody Teherán:Českoslovenští architekti v říši perského šáha, 1932–1948'. Books & Pipes Brno. ISBN 978-80-7485-302-9.
