= Phased array radar Ghadir =

Iranian radar facility

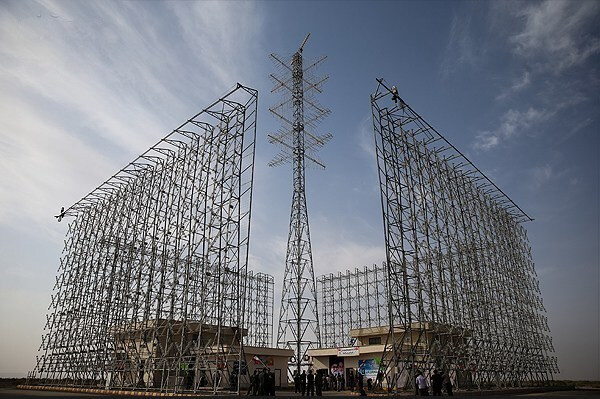
A Ghadir early-warning radar in 2014

The Ghadir Phased Array Radar (Persian: رادار آرایه فازی قدیر) is an Iranian radar installation with a range of 1,100 km (680 mi), capable of tracking targets up to a height of 300 km (190 mi). The radar was inaugurated by the Islamic Revolutionary Guard Corps. According to official military sources, the radar has the ability to detect air targets, stealth aircraft, cruise and ballistic missiles, and low earth orbit satellites. The radar was tested for the first time during The Great Prophet IX exercise.

The opening ceremony was overseen by Brigadier General Farzad Ismaili, commander of Khatam ol-Anbia Air Defense Base. All stages of research, design and manufacturing were conducted under the guidance of the IRGC Air Force, and the radar was the result of 90 years of research.

As of 2023, there are seven known Ghadir radars. Western sources describe the Ghadir over-the-horizon radar as an important component of Iran's integrated air defense system. The Ghadir radar is part of a family of Russian Rezonans-NE radars.

In 2025, as part of the Twelve-Day War, it was reported that the Israel Defense Forces had struck at least six Ghadir radars, according to satellite imagery.
