= Astalak-e Danshur =

Village in Tehran province, Iran

Astalak-e Danshur Persian: اصطلک دانشور
- Village
- Interactive map of Astalak-e Danshur
- Coordinates: 35.732°N 51.788°E
- Country: Iran
- Province: Tehran
- County: Pardis
- District: Central
- Rural District: Karasht

Population (2016)
  - Total: 0
- Time zone: UTC+3:30 (IRST)

Astalak-e Danshur (Persian: اصطلک دانشور) (Note: Also romanized as Āṣṭalaḵ-e Dānshūr; also known as Astalak-e Bala) is a village in Karasht Rural District of the Central District in Pardis County, Tehran province, Iran.

== Demographics ==
=== Population ===
At the time of the 2006 National Census, the village's population was 114 in 45 households, when it was in Siyahrud Rural District of the Central District in Tehran County. The following census in 2011 counted a population below the reporting threshold. The 2016 census measured the population of the village as zero, by which time most of the rural district had been separated from the county in the establishment of Pardis County. Astalak-e Danshur was transferred to Karasht Rural District created in the new Bumahen District.

The rural district was separated from the district in forming the Central District in 2020.
