= Siah Sang-e Jadid =

Village in Tehran province, Iran

Siah Sang-e Jadid Persian: سياه‌سنگ جديد
- Village
- Location within Iran
- Coordinates: 35°43′36″N 51°46′42″E
- Country: Iran
- Province: Tehran
- County: Pardis
- District: Central
- Rural District: Bagh-e Komesh

Population (2016)
  - Total: 497
- Time zone: UTC+3:30 (IRST)

Siah Sang-e Jadid (Persian: سياه‌سنگ جديد) (Note: Also romanized as Sīāh Sang-e Jadīd; also known as Sīāh Sang) is a village in Bagh-e Komesh Rural District of the Central District in Pardis County, Tehran province, Iran.

== Demographics ==
=== Population ===
At the time of the 2006 National Census, the village's population was 1,350 in 414 households, when it was in Siyahrud Rural District of the Central District in Tehran County. The following census in 2011 counted 977 people in 290 households. The 2016 census measured the population of the village as 497 people in 246 households, by which time most of the rural district had been separated from the county in the establishment of Pardis County. The village was transferred to Karasht Rural District created in the new Bumehen District.

In 2020, the rural district was separated from the district in forming the Central District, and Siah Sang-e Jadid was transferred to Bagh-e Komesh Rural District created in the new district.
