= Astalak-e Pain =

Village in Tehran province, Iran

Astalak-e Pain Persian: اصطلک پایین
- Village
- Location within Iran
- Coordinates: 35°43′51″N 51°47′36″E
- Country: Iran
- Province: Tehran
- County: Pardis
- District: Central
- Rural District: Bagh-e Komesh

Population (2016)
  - Total: 199
- Time zone: UTC+3:30 (IRST)

Astalak-e Pain (Persian: اصطلک پایین) (Note: Also romanized as Aşţalak-e Pā'īn) is a village in Bagh-e Komesh Rural District of the Central District in Pardis County, Tehran province, Iran.

== Demographics ==
=== Population ===
At the time of the 2006 National Census, the village's population was 127 in 40 households, when it was in Siyahrud Rural District of the Central District in Tehran County. The following census in 2011 counted 68 people in 19 households. The 2016 census measured the population of the village as 199 people in 56 households, by which time most of the rural district had been separated from the county in the establishment of Pardis County. The village was transferred to Karasht Rural District created in the new Bumehen District.

In 2020, the rural district was separated from the district in forming the Central District, and Astalak-e Pain was transferred to Bagh-e Komesh Rural District created in the new district.
