= Bagh-e Komesh =

Village in Tehran province, Iran

Bagh-e Komesh Persian: باغ كمش
- Village
- Location within Iran
- Coordinates: 35°42′16″N 51°47′02″E
- Country: Iran
- Province: Tehran
- County: Pardis
- District: Central
- Rural District: Bagh-e Komesh
- Elevation: 1,550–1,600 m (5,090–5,250 ft)

Population (2016)
  - Total: 2,566
- Time zone: UTC+3:30 (IRST)

Bagh-e Komesh (Persian: باغ كمش) (Note: Also romanized as Bāgh Komesh and Bāgh-e Komesh; also known as Bākūmīs) is a village in, and the capital of, Bagh-e Komesh Rural District in the Central District of Pardis County, Tehran province, Iran.

== Demographics ==
=== Population ===
At the time of the 2006 National Census, the village's population was 1,358 in 358 households, when it was in Siyahrud Rural District of the Central District in Tehran County. The following census in 2011 counted 1,916 people in 549 households. The 2016 census measured the population of the village as 2,566 people in 750 households, by which time most of the rural district had been separated from the county in the establishment of Pardis County. The village was transferred to Karasht Rural District created in the new Bumehen District. It was the most populous village in its rural district.

In 2020, the rural district was separated from the district in forming the Central District, and Bagh-e Komesh was transferred to Bagh-e Komesh Rural District created in the new district.
