= Khojir =

Village in Tehran province, Iran

Khojir Persian: خجير
- Village
- Location within Iran
- Coordinates: 35°39′52″N 51°43′45″E
- Country: Iran
- Province: Tehran
- County: Pardis
- District: Jajrud
- Rural District: Saidabad

Population (2016)
  - Total: 77
- Time zone: UTC+3:30 (IRST)

Khojir (Persian: خجير) (Note: Also romanized as Khojīr; also known as Ḩajīr) is a village in Saidabad Rural District of Jajrud District in Pardis County, Tehran province, Iran. Khojir has given its name to Khojir National Park, which lies between Road 79 and Road 44.

== Demographics ==
=== Population ===
At the time of the 2006 National Census, the village's population was 579 in 159 households, when it was in Siyahrud Rural District of the Central District in Tehran County. The following census in 2011 counted 379 people in 124 households. The 2016 census measured the population of the village as 77 people in 32 households, by which time most of the rural district had been separated from the county in the establishment of Pardis County. The village was transferred to Jajrud Rural District created in the new Jajrud District.

== Missile production complex ==
Khojir houses a missile production complex, which is closely linked to the military facility at Parchin. The installation at Khojir produces both liquid propellant and solid propellant. The "vast" Khojir complex is owned by the Shahid Hemmat Industrial Group.

In late June 2020, a blast at the facility lit up the night sky in Tehran. The main buildings at the missile production centre appeared undamaged.
