= Zardestan =

Village in Tehran province, Iran

Zardestan Persian: زردستان
- Village
- Location within Iran
- Coordinates: 35°40′13″N 51°52′06″E
- Country: Iran
- Province: Tehran
- County: Pardis
- District: Bumahen
- Rural District: Taherabd

Population (2016)
  - Total: 41
- Time zone: UTC+3:30 (IRST)

Zardestan (Persian: زردستان) (Note: Also romanized as Zardestān; also known as Zarestān) is a village in Taherabad Rural District of Bumahen District in Pardis County, Tehran province, Iran.

== Demographics ==
=== Population ===
At the time of the 2006 National Census, the village's population was 38 in 11 households, when it was in Siyahrud Rural District of the Central District in Tehran County. The following census in 2011 counted 21 people in six households. The 2016 census measured the population of the village as 41 people in 17 households, by which time most of the rural district had been separated from the county in the establishment of Pardis County. The village was transferred to Gol Khandan Rural District created in the new Bumahen District.

In 2020, Zardestan was transferred to Taherabad Rural District created in the same district.
