= Tamasha, Iran =

Village in Tehran province, Iran

Tamasha Persian: تماشا
- Village
- Location within Iran
- Coordinates: 35°39′32″N 51°49′52″E
- Country: Iran
- Province: Tehran
- County: Pardis
- District: Bumahen
- Rural District: Taherabd

Population (2016)
  - Total: 15
- Time zone: UTC+3:30 (IRST)

Tamasha (Persian: تماشا) (Note: Also romanized as Tamāshā) is a village in Taherabad Rural District of Bumahen District in Pardis County, Tehran province, Iran.

== Demographics ==
=== Population ===
At the time of the 2006 National Census, the village's population was 75 in 19 households, when it was in Siyahrud Rural District of the Central District in Tehran County. The following census in 2011 counted a population below the reporting threshold. The 2016 census measured the population of the village as 15 people in four households, by which time most of the rural district had been separated from the county in the establishment of Pardis County. The village was transferred to Karasht Rural District created in the new Bumahen District.

In 2020, the rural district was separated from the district in forming the Central District, and Tamasha was transferred to Taherabad Rural District created in Bumahen District.
