= Karasht =

Village in Tehran province, Iran

Karasht Persian: كرشت
- Village
- Location within Iran
- Coordinates: 35°43′07″N 51°50′01″E
- Country: Iran
- Province: Tehran
- County: Pardis
- District: Central
- Rural District: Karasht

Population (2016)
  - Total: 1,785
- Time zone: UTC+3:30 (IRST)

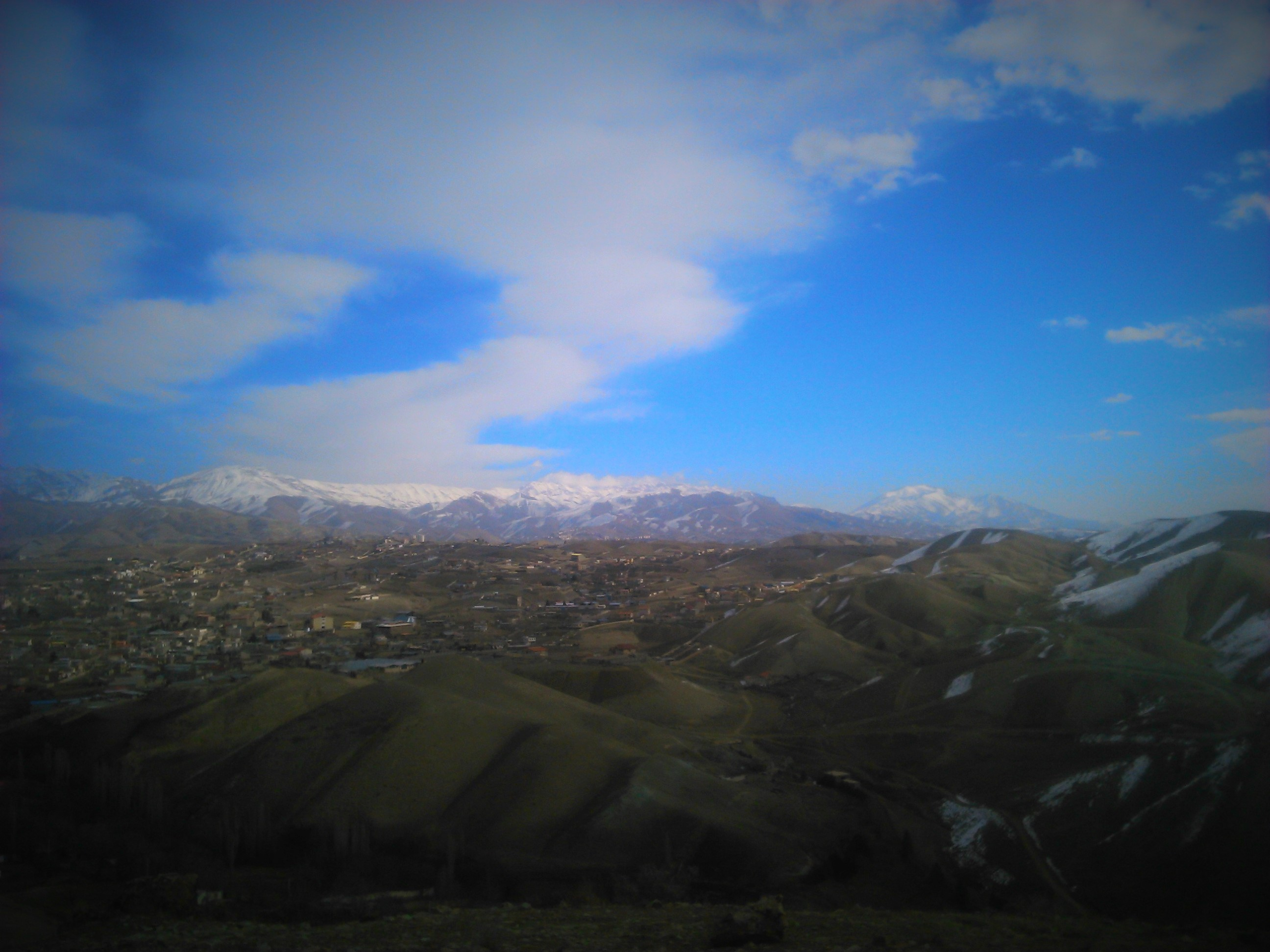
View from the heights west of the village

Karasht (Persian: كرشت) is a village in, and the capital of, Karasht Rural District in the Central District of Pardis County, Tehran province, Iran.

== Demographics ==
=== Population ===
At the time of the 2006 National Census, the village's population was 1,528 in 399 households, when it was in Siyahrud Rural District of the Central District in Tehran County. The following census in 2011 counted 919 people in 255 households. The 2016 census measured the population of the village as 1,785 people in 531 households, by which time most of the rural district had been separated from the county in the establishment of Pardis County. Karasht was transferred to Karasht Rural District created in the new Bumahen District.

The rural district was separated from the district in forming the Central District in 2020.
