= Vasefjan =

Village in Tehran province, Iran

Vasefjan Persian: واصفجان
- Village

- Location within Iran
- Coordinates: 35°46′06″N 51°49′24″E
- Country: Iran
- Province: Tehran
- County: Pardis
- District: Central
- Rural District: Karasht

Population (2016)
  - Total: 173
- Time zone: UTC+3:30 (IRST)

Vasefjan (Persian: واصفجان) (Note: Also romanized as Vāşefjān, Vāşfejān, and Vāşf Jān) is a village in Karasht Rural District of the Central District in Pardis County, Tehran province, Iran.

== Demographics ==
=== Population ===
At the time of the 2006 National Census, the village's population was 96 in 28 households, when it was in Siyahrud Rural District of the Central District in Tehran County. The following census in 2011 counted 49 people in 17 households. The 2016 census measured the population of the village as 173 people in 62 households, by which time most of the rural district had been separated from the county in the establishment of Pardis County. Vasfejan was transferred to Karasht Rural District created in the new Bumahen District.

The rural district was separated from the district in forming the Central District in 2020.
