= Taherabad, Tehran =

Village in Tehran province, Iran

Taherabad Persian: طاهرآباد
- Village
- Location within Iran
- Coordinates: 35°42′12″N 51°52′10″E
- Country: Iran
- Province: Tehran
- County: Pardis
- District: Bumahen
- Rural District: Taherabd

Population (2016)
  - Total: 320
- Time zone: UTC+3:30 (IRST)

Taherabad (Persian: طاهرآباد) (Note: Also romanized as Ţāherābād; also known as Ḩoseynābād, Ḩoseynābād-e ‘Arab, Ḩoseynābād-e Ţāherābād, and Husainābād) is a village in, and the capital of, Taherabad Rural District in Bumahen District of Pardis County, Tehran province, Iran.

== Demographics ==
=== Population ===
At the time of the 2006 National Census, the village's population was 289 in 78 households, when it was in Siyahrud Rural District of the Central District in Tehran County. The following census in 2011 counted 109 people in 37 households. The 2016 census measured the population of the village as 320 people in 107 households, by which time most of the rural district had been separated from the county in the establishment of Pardis County. The village was transferred to Gol Khandan Rural District created in the new Bumahen District.

In 2020, Taherabad was transferred to Taherabad Rural District created in the same district.
