= Torqiyan-e Bala =

Village in Tehran province, Iran

Torqiyan-e Bala Persian: ترقيان بالا
- Village
- Location within Iran
- Coordinates: 35°42′31″N 51°41′39″E
- Country: Iran
- Province: Tehran
- County: Pardis
- District: Jajrud
- Rural District: Saidabad

Population (2016)
  - Total: 272
- Time zone: UTC+3:30 (IRST)

Torqiyan-e Bala (Persian: ترقيان بالا) is a village in Saidabad Rural District of Jajrud District in Pardis County, Tehran province, Iran.

== Demographics ==
=== Population ===
The village did not appear in the 2006 National Census, when it was in Siyahrud Rural District of the Central District in Tehran County. The following census in 2011 counted 215 people in 75 households. The 2016 census measured the population of the village as 272 people in 85 households, by which time most of the rural district had been separated from the county in the establishment of Pardis County. The village was transferred to Jajrud Rural District created in the new Jajrud District.
