= Bagh-e Komesh Rural District =

Rural district in Tehran province, Iran

Bagh-e Komesh Rural District Persian: دهستان باغ کمش
- Rural District
- Location within Iran
- Coordinates: 35°43′N 51°47′E
- Country: Iran
- Province: Tehran
- County: Pardis
- District: Central
- Established: 2020
- Capital: Bagh-e Komesh
- Time zone: UTC+3:30 (IRST)

Bagh-e Komesh Rural District (Persian: دهستان باغ کمش) is in the Central District of Pardis County, Tehran province, Iran. Its capital is the village of Bagh-e Komesh, whose population at the time of the 2016 National Census was 2,566 people in 750 households.

== History ==
In 2012, the cities of Bumahen and Pardis, and most of Siyahrud Rural District, were separated from Tehran County in the establishment of Pardis County.

In 2020, Karasht Rural District and the city of Pardis were separated from Bumahen District in forming the Central District, and Bagh-e Komesh Rural District was created in the new district.

=== Other villages in the rural district ===
- Astalak-e Pain
- Siah Sang-e Jadid
