= Shamsabad, Tehran =

Village in Tehran province, Iran

Shamsabad Persian: شمس آباد
- Village
- Location within Iran
- Coordinates: 35°44′59″N 51°43′36″E
- Country: Iran
- Province: Tehran
- County: Pardis
- District: Jajrud
- Rural District: Jajrud

Population (2016)
  - Total: 115
- Time zone: UTC+3:30 (IRST)

Shamsabad (Persian: شمس آباد) (Note: Also romanized as Shamsābād) is a village in Jajrud Rural District of Jajrud District in Pardis County, Tehran province, Iran.

== Demographics ==
=== Population ===
At the time of the 2006 National Census, the village's population was 78 in 28 households, when it was in Siyahrud Rural District of the Central District in Tehran County. The following census in 2011 counted a population below the reporting threshold. The 2016 census measured the population of the village as 115 people in 35 households, by which time most of the rural district had been separated from the county in the establishment of Pardis County. The village was transferred to Jajrud Rural District created in the new Jajrud District.
