= Kamard =

Village in Tehran province, Iran

Kamard Persian: كمرد
- Village
- Location within Iran
- Coordinates: 35°46′00″N 51°44′53″E
- Country: Iran
- Province: Tehran
- County: Pardis
- District: Jajrud
- Rural District: Jajrud

Population (2016)
  - Total: 762
- Time zone: UTC+3:30 (IRST)

Kamard is a village in Jajrud Rural District of Jajrud District in Pardis County, Tehran province, Iran.

== Demographics ==
=== Population ===
At the time of the 2006 National Census, the village's population was 533 in 141 households, when it was in Siyahrud Rural District of the Central District in Tehran County. The following census in 2011 counted 544 people in 164 households. The 2016 census measured the population of the village as 762 people in 220 households, by which time most of the rural district had been separated from the county in the establishment of Pardis County. The village was transferred to Jajrud Rural District created in the new Jajrud District.
