= Gol Darreh, Tehran =

Village in Tehran province, Iran

Gol Darreh Persian: گلدره
- Village
- Location within Iran
- Coordinates: 35°45′26″N 51°51′09″E
- Country: Iran
- Province: Tehran
- County: Pardis
- District: Bumahen
- Rural District: Gol Khandan

Population (2016)
  - Total: 123
- Time zone: UTC+3:30 (IRST)

Gol Darreh (Persian: گلدره) (Note: Also romanized as Galdarreh) is a village in Gol Khandan Rural District of Bumahen District in Pardis County, Tehran province, Iran.

== Demographics ==
=== Population ===
At the time of the 2006 National Census, the village's population was 242 in 64 households, when it was in Siyahrud Rural District of the Central District in Tehran County. The following census in 2011 counted 88 people in 23 households. The 2016 census measured the population of the village as 123 people in 34 households, by which time most of the rural district had been separated from the county in the establishment of Pardis County. Gol Darreh was transferred to Gol Khandan Rural District created in the new Bumahen District.
