= Ashtargarden =

Village in Tehran province, Iran

Ashtargarden Persian: اشترگردن
- Village
- Location within Iran
- Coordinates: 35°44′59″N 51°44′18″E
- Country: Iran
- Province: Tehran
- County: Pardis
- District: Jajrud
- Rural District: Jajrud

Population (2016)
  - Total: 0
- Time zone: UTC+3:30 (IRST)

Ashtargarden (Persian: اشترگردن) (Note: Also romanized as Āshtargarden) is a village in Jajrud Rural District of Jajrud District in Pardis County, Tehran province, Iran.

== Demographics ==
=== Population ===
At the time of the 2006 National Census, the village's population was 61 in 29 households, when it was in Siyahrud Rural District of the Central District in Tehran County. The village did not appear in the following census of 2011. The 2016 census measured the population of the village as zero, by which time most of the rural district had been separated from the county in the establishment of Pardis County. The village was transferred to Jajrud Rural District created in the new Jajrud District.
