= Kord-e Nabard =

Village in Tehran province, Iran

Kord-e Nabard Persian: کردنبرد
- Village
- Location within Iran
- Coordinates: 35°41′12″N 51°52′19″E
- Country: Iran
- Province: Tehran
- County: Pardis
- District: Bumahen
- Rural District: Gol Khandan

Population (2016)
  - Total: 69
- Time zone: UTC+3:30 (IRST)

Kord-e Nabard (Persian: کردنبرد) is a village in Gol Khandan Rural District of Bumahen District in Pardis County, Tehran province, Iran.

== Demographics ==
=== Population ===
At the time of the 2006 National Census, the village's population was 86 in 22 households, when it was in Siyahrud Rural District of the Central District in Tehran County. The following census in 2011 counted 84 people in 19 households. The 2016 census measured the population of the village as 69 people in 24 households, by which time most of the rural district had been separated from the county in the establishment of Pardis County. Kord-e Nabard was transferred to Gol Khandan Rural District created in the new Bumahen District.
