= Gol Khandan-e Qadim =

Village in Tehran province, Iran

Gol Khandan-e Qadim Persian: گل‌خندان قديم
- Village
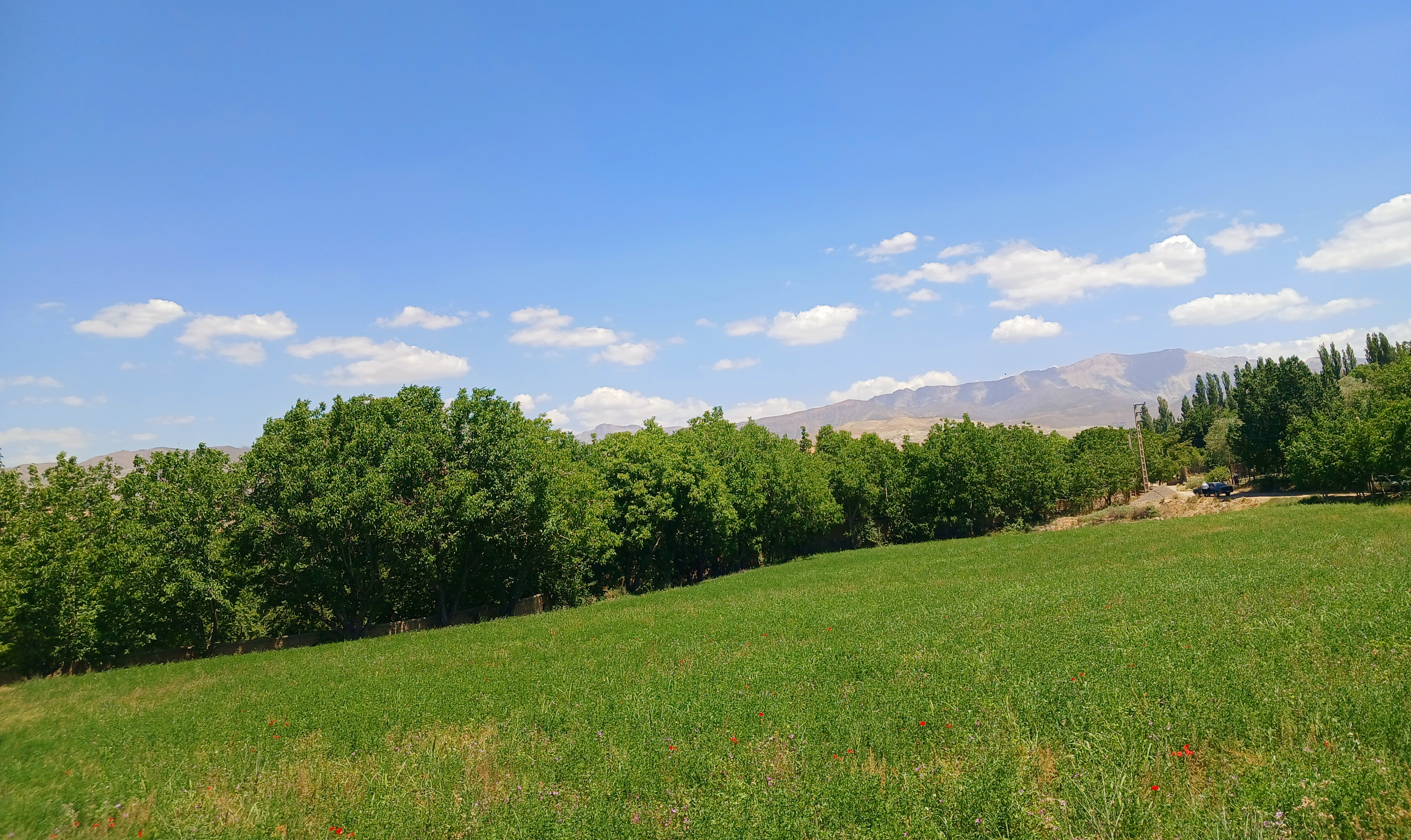
- Agricultural land in Gol Khandan-e Qadim

- Location within Iran
- Coordinates: 35°41′39″N 51°52′41″E
- Country: Iran
- Province: Tehran
- County: Pardis
- District: Bumahen
- Rural District: Gol Khandan

Population (2016)
  - Total: 553
- Time zone: UTC+3:30 (IRST)

Gol Khandan-e Qadim (Persian: گل‌خندان قديم) (Note: Also romanized as Gol Khandān Qadīm, Gol Khandān-e Qadīm, and Golkhandān-e Qadīm; also known as Gol Khandān and Golkhandān) is a village in, and the capital of, Gol Khandan Rural District in Bumahen District of Pardis County, Tehran province, Iran.

== Demographics ==
=== Population ===
At the time of the 2006 National Census, the village's population was 250 in 66 households, when it was in Siyahrud Rural District of the Central District in Tehran County. The following census in 2011 counted 175 people in 52 households. The 2016 census measured the population of the village as 553 people in 177 households, by which time most of the rural district had been separated from the county in the establishment of Pardis County. Gol Khandan-e Qadim was transferred to Gol Khandan Rural District created in the new Bumahen District. It was the most populous village in its rural district.
