= Taherabad Rural District =

Rural district in Tehran province, Iran

Taherabad Rural District Persian: دهستان طاهرآباد
- Rural District
- Location within Iran
- Coordinates: 35°40′N 51°50′E
- Country: Iran
- Province: Tehran
- County: Pardis
- District: Bumahen
- Established: 2020
- Capital: Taherabad
- Time zone: UTC+3:30 (IRST)

Taherabad Rural District (Persian: دهستان طاهرآباد) is in Bumahen District of Pardis County, Tehran province, Iran. Its capital is the village of Taherabad, whose population at the time of the 2016 National Census was 320 in 107 households.

== History ==
In 2012, the cities of Bumahen and Pardis, and most of Siyahrud Rural District, were separated from Tehran County in the establishment of Pardis County. Taherabad Rural District was created in Bumahen District in 2020.

=== Other villages in the rural district ===
- Tamasha
- Zardestan
