= Gol Khandan =

Gol Khandan or Golkhandan (Persian: گل خندان) may refer to:

- Gol Khandan, Chenaran, Razavi Khorasan Province
- Gol Khandan, Dargaz, Razavi Khorasan Province
- Gol Khandan-e Jadid, Tehran Province
- Gol Khandan-e Qadim, Tehran Province
