= Saidabad Rural District (Pardis County) =

Rural district in Tehran province, Iran

Saidabad Rural District Persian: دهستان سعیدآباد
- Rural District
- Location within Iran
- Coordinates: 35°39′N 51°46′E
- Country: Iran
- Province: Tehran
- County: Pardis
- District: Jajrud
- Capital: Saidabad-e Jajrud

Population (2016)
  - Total: 7,200
- Time zone: UTC+3:30 (IRST)

Saidabad Rural District (Persian: دهستان سعیدآباد) is in Jajrud District of Pardis County, Tehran province, Iran. It is administered from the city of Saidabad-e Jajrud.

== History ==
In 2012, the cities of Bumahen and Pardis, and most of Siyahrud Rural District, were separated from Tehran County in the establishment of Pardis County. Saidabad Rural District was created in the new Jajrud District.

== Demographics ==
=== Population ===
At the time of the 2016 census, the rural district's population was 7,600 in 2,149 households. The most populous of its six villages was Saidabad-e Jajrud (now a city), with 7,200 people.

=== Other villages in the rural district ===
- Khojir
- Takht-e Chenar
- Torqiyan-e Bala
