= Gol Khandan-e Jadid =

Village in Tehran province, Iran

Gol Khandan-e Jadid Persian: گل خندان جديد
- Village
- Location within Iran
- Coordinates: 35°41′52″N 51°52′32″E
- Country: Iran
- Province: Tehran
- County: Pardis
- District: Bumahen
- Rural District: Gol Khandan

Population (2016)
  - Total: 444
- Time zone: UTC+3:30 (IRST)

Gol Khandan-e Jadid (Persian: گل خندان جديد) (Note: Also romanized as Gol Khandān-e Jadīd and Golkhandān-e Jadīd) is a village in Gol Khandan Rural District of Bumahen District in Pardis County, Tehran province, Iran.

== Demographics ==
=== Population ===
At the time of the 2006 National Census, the village's population was 197 in 49 households, when it was in Siyahrud Rural District of the Central District in Tehran County. The following census in 2011 counted 162 people in 53 households. The 2016 census measured the population of the village as 444 people in 150 households, by which time most of the rural district had been separated from the county in the establishment of Pardis County. Gol Khandan-e Jadid was transferred to Gol Khandan Rural District created in the new Bumahen District.
