= Demographics of Tehran =

- Population pyramid of the Tehran province in 2016
- Population: 8,293,140 (2011)

Tehran is one of the most ethnically diverse cities in Asia. The city of Tehran (not to be confused with the larger, Tehran Metropolitan) had a population of approximately 9,729,740 in 2025 and the Tehran Province had a 14,437,000 population in 2023.

== Population ==
Tehran's population from the Safavid era up to the present
Year	Population	Average growth rate per year(%)	Government
1554	1 000		Safavid
1626	3 000	1.4	Safavid
1797	15 000	5.2	Qajar
1807	50 000	12.03	Qajar
1812	60 000	3.6	Qajar
1834	80 000	2.8	Qajar
1867	147 256	2.9	Qajar
1930	250 000	2.4	Pahlavi
1940	540 087	6.6	Pahlavi
1956	1 560 934	5.5	Pahlavi
1966	2 719 730	5.1	Pahlavi
1976	4 530 223	2.9	Pahlavi
1986	6 058 207	1.3	Islamic Republic
1991	6 497 238	0.78	Islamic Republic
1996	6 758 845	1.3	Islamic Republic
2006	7 711 230		Islamic Republic

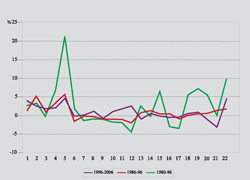
Graph of the population's average growth rate per year in the districts of Tehran, from one census to the next. See left for the data in tabular form.

Population of the districts of Tehran
District	Year				Average growth rate per year(%)		
District	1976	1986	1996	2006	1976-1986	1986-1996	1996-2006
1	182 883	216 467	249 676	375 881	2.8	1.4	4.1
2	220 545	269 482	458 089	607 003	3.3	5.3	2.8
3	222 007	217 084	237 301	290 272	-0.4	0.9	2.0
4	316 904	479 512	663 166	810 548	6.9	3.2	2.0
5	67 199	243 824	427 995	675 633	21.5	5.6	4.6
6	231 683	258 838	220 231	236 252	1.8	-1.6	0.7
7	327 032	302 217	300 212	309 938	-1.3	-0.1	0.3
8	365 516	346 474	336 474	378 544	-0.9	-0.3	1.2
9	200 867	189 805	173 482	169 988	-0.9	-0.9	-0.2
10	343 551	311 104	282 308	315 225	-1.7	-1.0	1.1
11	276 712	247 927	223 965	274 650	-1.8	-1.0	2.0
12	301 701	230 657	189 625	246 874	-4.5	-2.0	2.6
13	209 600	245 447	266 700	245 312	2.6	0.8	-0.8
14	398 858	394 111	450 160	482 682	-0.2	1.3	0.7
15	420 561	622 517	649 370	641 344	6.5	0.4	-0.1
16	347 535	289 474	303 410	290 348	-3.0	0.5	-0.4
17	353 428	287 367	264 300	259 857	-3.4	-0.8	-0.2
18	211 606	296 430	298 600	316 517	5.6	0.1	0.6
19	140 354	216 318	227 389	245 003	7.2	0.5	0.7
20	255 653	356 079	379 750	323 716	5.5	0.6	-1.6
21		188 890	216 970	154 427		1.4	-3.4
22	31 162	56 020	67 230	107 130	9.8	1.8	4.7

Population of settlements in Tehran's metropolitan area
Settlement	Year						Average growth rate per year(%)				
Settlement	1956	1966	1976	1986	1996	2006	1956-1966	1966-1976	1976-1986	1986-1996	1996-2006
Eslamshahr	481	1 006	50 292	215 129	265 450	351 171	7.4	39.1	14.5	2.1	2.8
Eshtehard	4 542	5 149	5 074	8 095	10 274	16 988	1.3	-0.1	3.7	2.4	5.0
Pishva	4 468	6 332	9 934	17 283	29 884	41 480	3.5	4.5	5.5	5.5	3.3
Damavand	4 523	5 391	9 902	15 309	22 337	36 443	1.8	6.1	3.3	3.8	4.9
Robat Karim	2 238	3 147	47 663	17 903	26 656	62 937	3.0	27.2	-9.8	4.0	8.6
Rudehen	1 161	1 643	3 083	6 550	11 866	19 535	4.1	5.7	7.5	5.9	5.0
Shahriar	3 748	6 626	11 697	224 333	40 058	189 120	5.7	5.7	29.5	-17.2	15.5
Qarchak	167	1 167	14 925	77 957	142 690	173 832	19.4	25.5	16.5	6.0	2.0
Karaj	14 526	44 243	137 926	275 100	940 968	1 377 450	11.1	11.4	6.9	12.3	3.8
Nazarabad	799	2 881	9 889	21 660	69 342	97 684	12.8	12.3	7.8	11.6	3.4
Varamin	5 205	11 183	25 792	58 311	107 233	208 569	7.6	7.4	8.2	6.1	6.7
Hashtgerd	1 078	1 828	5 628	16 761	33 568	45 332	5.3	11.2	10.9	6.9	3.0
Bumahen					1 166	43 004					36.1
Pardis						25 360					
Hasanabad	594	463	1 974	1 211	11 178	20 451	-2.5	14.5	-4.9	22.2	6.0
Lavasan	1 490	1 182	7 761	6 530	10 587	15 448	7.4	39.1	-1.7	4.8	3.8
Mahdasht	1 267	2 463	5 640	17 788	28 976	43 100	1.3	-0.1	11.5	4.9	4.0
Qods	994	2 467	8 406	4 802	138 278	229 534	3.5	4.5	21.9	6.1	5.1
Malard	1 369	2 596	5 970	9 160	88 118	228 673	1.8	6.1	4.3	22.6	9.5
Pakdasht	704	2 668	5 459	18 308	49 220	126 281	3.0	27.2	12.1	9.9	9.4

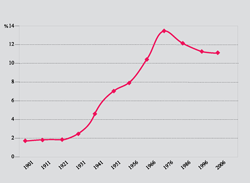
Graph of the Tehran's population as percentage of the country's population per census. See left for the data in tabular form.

Tehran's population as part of Iran's population
Year	Percentage
1901	1.7
1911	1.8
1921	1.8
1931	2.5
1941	4.6
1951	7
1956	8
1966	10.5
1976	13.4
1986	12.2
1996	11.3
2006	11.07

== Ethnic groups ==
=== Persians ===
According to a 2010 census conducted by the Sociology Department of Tehran University in many districts of Tehran across various socio-economic classes in proportion to the population sizes of each district and socio-economic class, 63% of people in Tehran were born in Tehran, 98% can speak the Persian language, 75% identify themselves as ethnic Persians, and 13% have some degree of proficiency in a European language.

=== Azerbaijanis ===
Azerbaijanis in Tehran also known as Turks in Tehran or Azeris in Tehran are Iranians of Azerbaijani ethnicity. Azerbaijanis comprise 25% of Tehran's population and 20.3% – 25% of Tehran Province's population.

=== Mazanderanis ===
Ethnic Mazanderanis are the third-largest, comprising about 8.2% of the total population.

== See also ==
- Tehran demographics
