= Saidabad-e Jajrud =

City in Tehran province, Iran

Saidabad-e Jajrud Persian: سعيدآباد جاجرود
- City
- Location within Iran
- Coordinates: 35°44′02″N 51°42′02″E
- Country: Iran
- Province: Tehran
- County: Pardis
- District: Jajrud
- Established as a city: 2021

Population (2016)
  - Total: 7,200
- Time zone: UTC+3:30 (IRST)

Saidabad-e Jajrud (Persian: سعيدآباد جاجرود) (Note: Also romanized as Sa‘īdābād-e Jājrud) is a city in Jajrud District of Pardis County, Tehran province, Iran, serving as the administrative center for Saidabad Rural District.

== Demographics ==
=== Population ===
At the time of the 2006 National Census, Saidabad-e Jajrud's population was 5,082 in 1,419 households, when it was a village in Siyahrud Rural District of the Central District of Tehran County. The following census in 2011 counted 5,534 people in 1,542 households. The 2016 census measured the population of the village as 7,200 people in 2,012 households, by which time most of the rural district had been separated from the county in the establishment of Pardis County. The village was transferred to Saidabad Rural District created in the new Jajrud District. It was the most populous village in its rural district.

Saidabad-e Jajrud was converted to a city in 2021.
