= Khosrowabad, Tehran =

City in Tehran province, Iran

Khosrowabad Persian: خسروآباد
- City
- Location within Iran
- Coordinates: 35°45′10″N 51°42′02″E
- Country: Iran
- Province: Tehran
- County: Pardis
- District: Jajrud
- Established as a city: 2020

Population (2016)
  - Total: 1,083
- Time zone: UTC+3:30 (IRST)

Khosrowabad (Persian: خسروآباد) (Note: Also romanized as Khosrowābād) is a city in, and the capital of, Jajrud District in Pardis County, Tehran province, Iran. It also serves as the administrative center for Jajrud Rural District.

== Demographics ==
=== Population ===
At the time of the 2006 National Census, Khosrowabad's population was 1,180 in 386 households, when it was a village in Siyahrud Rural District of the Central District in Tehran County. The following census in 2011 counted 799 people in 250 households. The 2016 census measured the population of the village as 1,083 people in 340 households, by which time most of the rural district had been separated from the county in the establishment of Pardis County. The village was transferred to Jajrud Rural District created in the new Jajrud District. It was the most populous village in its rural district.

Khosrowabad was converted to a city in 2020.
