= Yurd-e Shad =

Former village in Tehran province, Iran

Yurd-e Shad Persian: يوردشاد
- Former Village
- Country: Iran
- Province: Tehran
- County: Tehran
- District: Central
- Rural District: Siyahrud

Population (2006)
  - Total: 44
- Time zone: UTC+3:30 (IRST)

Yurd-e Shad (Persian: يوردشاد) (Note: Also romanized as Yūrd-e Shād) was a village in Siyahrud Rural District of the Central District in Tehran County, Tehran province, Iran. It was abandoned as it was close to Mamloo Dam's area.

== Demographics ==
=== Population ===
At the time of the 2006 National Census, the village's population was 44 in 13 households. The village did not appear in the following censuses of 2011 and 2016 as it was totally abandoned.
