= Tamasha (disambiguation) =

Tamasha is a traditional form of Marathi theatre

Tamasha may also refer to:

- Tamasha (ablution), an ablution ritual in Mandaeism
- Tamasha, Iran, a village in Karasht Rural District
- Tamasha (1952 film), a Hindi-language romantic comedy film
- Tamasha (2015 film), a Hindi-language romantic comedy film
  - Tamasha (soundtrack)
- Thamaasha, a 2019 Malayalam-language film
- Tamasha (TV series), a 2022 Pakistani reality show
