= Sanjarian =

Village in Tehran province, Iran

Sanjarian Persian: سنجريان
- Village
- Location within Iran
- Coordinates: 35°41′16″N 51°42′01″E
- Country: Iran
- Province: Tehran
- County: Tehran
- District: Central
- Rural District: Siyahrud
- Elevation: 1,380 m (4,530 ft)

Population (2016)
  - Total: 172
- Time zone: UTC+3:30 (IRST)

Sanjarian (Persian: سنجريان) (Note: Also romanized as Sanjārīān; also known as Sangareyūn and Sangarīān) is a village in Siyahrud Rural District of the Central District in Tehran County, Tehran province, Iran.

== Demographics ==
=== Population ===
At the time of the 2006 National Census, the village's population was 361 in 95 households. The following census in 2011 counted 103 people in 27 households. The 2016 census measured the population of the village as 172 people in 60 households.
