= Gol Khandan Rural District =

Rural district in Tehran province, Iran

Gol Khandan Rural District Persian: دهستان گل خندان
- Rural District
- Location within Iran
- Coordinates: 35°41′N 51°52′E
- Country: Iran
- Province: Tehran
- County: Pardis
- District: Bumahen
- Established: 2012
- Capital: Gol Khandan-e Qadim

Population (2016)
  - Total: 1,550
- Time zone: UTC+3:30 (IRST)

Gol Khandan Rural District (Persian: دهستان گل خندان) is in Bumahen District of Pardis County, Tehran province, Iran. Its capital is the village of Gol Khandan-e Qadim.

== History ==
In 2012, the cities of Bumahen and Pardis, and most of Siyahrud Rural District, were separated from Tehran County in the establishment of Pardis County. Gol Khandan Rural District was created in the new Bumahen District.

== Demographics ==
=== Population ===
At the time of the 2016 census, the rural district's population was 1,550 in 509 households. The most populous of its six villages was Gol Khandan-e Qadim, with 553 people.

=== Other villages in the rural district ===
- Gol Darreh
- Gol Khandan-e Jadid
- Kord-e Nabard
