= Sorkheh Hesar, Tehran =

Village in Tehran province, Iran

Sorkheh Hesar Persian: سرخه حصار
- Village
- Location within Iran
- Coordinates: 35°43′20″N 51°36′09″E
- Country: Iran
- Province: Tehran
- County: Tehran
- District: Central
- Rural District: Siyahrud

Population (2016)
  - Total: 413
- Time zone: UTC+3:30 (IRST)

Sorkheh Hesar (Persian: سرخه حصار) (Note: Also romanized as Sorkheh Ḩeşār) is a village in Siyahrud Rural District of the Central District in Tehran County, Tehran province, Iran. It is an eastern suburb Tehran.

== Demographics ==
=== Population ===
The village did not appear in the 2006 National Census. The following census in 2011 counted 664 people in 214 households. The 2016 census measured the population of the village as 413 people in 128 households.
