= Hajarabad =

Village in Tehran province, Iran

Hajarabad Persian: هاجراباد
- Village
- Location within Iran
- Coordinates: 35°40′53″N 51°36′42″E
- Country: Iran
- Province: Tehran
- County: Tehran
- District: Central
- Rural District: Siyahrud

Population (2016)
  - Total: 282
- Time zone: UTC+3:30 (IRST)

Hajarabad (Persian: هاجراباد) (Note: Also romanized as Hājarābād) is a village in Siyahrud Rural District of the Central District in Tehran County, Tehran province, Iran.

== Demographics ==
=== Population ===
At the time of the 2006 National Census, the village's population was 263 in 70 households. The following census in 2011 counted 196 people in 61 households. The 2016 census measured the population of the village as 262 people in 92 households.
