= Hameh Sin =

Village in Tehran province, Iran

Hameh Sin Persian: همه سين
- Village
- Location within Iran
- Coordinates: 35°40′32″N 51°36′25″E
- Country: Iran
- Province: Tehran
- County: Tehran
- District: Central
- Rural District: Siyahrud

Population (2016)
  - Total: 1,127
- Time zone: UTC+3:30 (IRST)

Hameh Sin (Persian: همه سين) (Note: Also romanized as Hameh Sīn; also known as Hamasīn, Torkaman, and Torkaman Deh-e Hamsīn) is a village in Siyahrud Rural District of the Central District in Tehran County, Tehran province, Iran.

== Demographics ==
=== Population ===
At the time of the 2006 National Census, the village's population was 982 in 269 households. The following census in 2011 counted 732 people in 228 households. The 2016 census measured the population of the village as 1,127 people in 368 households.
