= Mesgarabad =

Village in Tehran province, Iran

Mesgarabad Persian: مسگرآباد
- Village
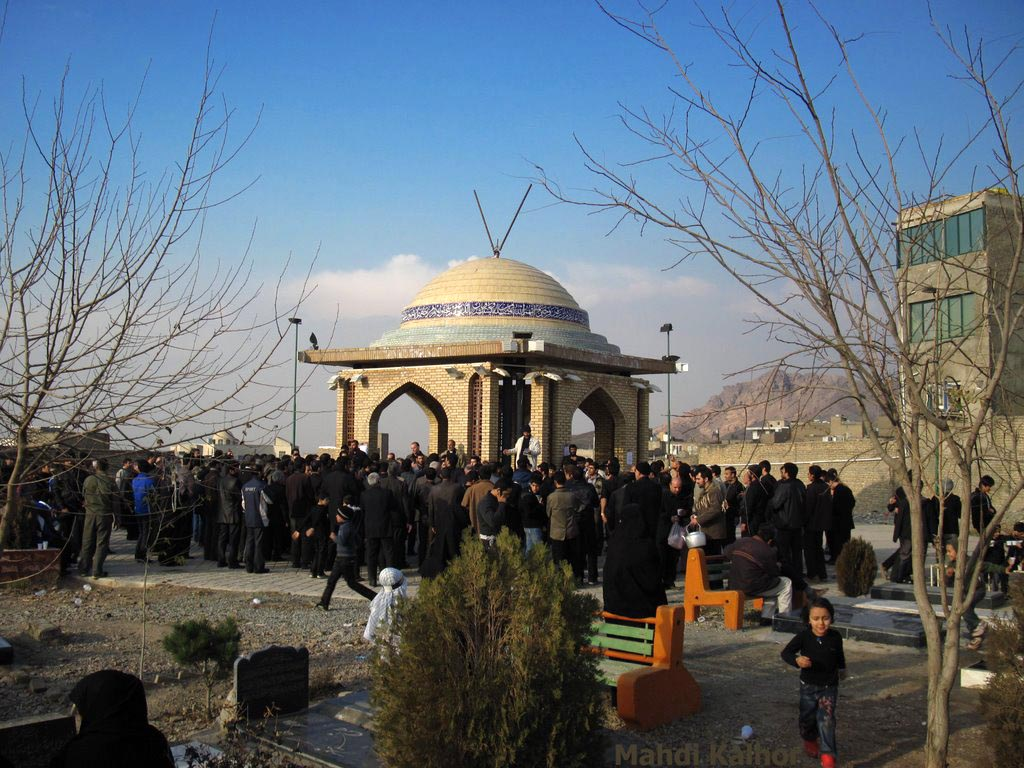

- Location within Iran
- Coordinates: 35°37′38″N 51°30′46″E
- Country: Iran
- Province: Tehran
- County: Tehran
- District: Central
- Rural District: Siyahrud

Population (2016)
  - Total: 2,265
- Time zone: UTC+3:30 (IRST)

Mesgarabad (Persian: مسگرآباد) (Note: Also romanized as Mesgarābād, also known as Miskarābād) is a village in Siyahrud Rural District of the Central District in Tehran County, Tehran province, Iran. It is a suburb southeast of Afsariyeh neighborhood in Tehran and east of Masoudiyeh town.

== Demographics ==
=== Population ===
At the time of the 2006 National Census, the village's population was 3,435 in 834 households, when it was in Ghaniabad Rural District of the Central District of Ray County. The following census in 2011 counted 3,121 people in 879 households, by which time Mesgarabad had been transferred to Siyahrud Rural District of the Central District in Tehran County. The 2016 census measured the population of the village as 2,265 people in 722 households. It was the most populous village in its rural district.
