= Tellow-e Bala =

Village in Tehran province, Iran

Tellow-e Bala Persian: تلوبالا
- Village
- Location within Iran
- Coordinates: 35°46′23″N 51°38′06″E
- Country: Iran
- Province: Tehran
- County: Tehran
- District: Central
- Rural District: Siyahrud
- Elevation: 1,750 m (5,740 ft)

Population (2016)
  - Total: 209
- Time zone: UTC+3:30 (IRST)

Tellow-e Bala (Persian: تلوبالا) (Note: Also romanized as Talū Bālā, Tellow Bālā, and Tellow-e Bālā; also known as Tellow) is a village in, and the capital of, Siyahrud Rural District in the Central District of Tehran County, Tehran province, Iran. The previous capital of the rural district was the city of Bumahen.

== Demographics ==
=== Population ===
At the time of the 2006 National Census, the village's population was 23 in 14 households. The following census in 2011 counted 13 people in four households. The 2016 census measured the population of the village as 209 people in 68 households.
