= Jajrud Rural District =

Rural district in Tehran province, Iran

Jajrud Rural District Persian: دهستان جاجرود
- Rural District
- Location within Iran
- Coordinates: 35°46′N 51°43′E
- Country: Iran
- Province: Tehran
- County: Pardis
- District: Jajrud
- Capital: Khosrowabad

Population (2016)
  - Total: 2,264
- Time zone: UTC+3:30 (IRST)

Jajrud Rural District (Persian: دهستان جاجرود) is in Jajrud District of Pardis County, Tehran province, Iran. It is administered from the city of Khosrowabad.

== History ==
In 2012, the cities of Bumahen and Pardis, and most of Siyahrud Rural District, were separated from Tehran County in the establishment of Pardis County. Jajrud Rural District was created in the new Jajrud District.

== Demographics ==
=== Population ===
At the time of the 2016 census, the rural district's population was 2,264 in 724 households. The most populous of its seven villages was Khosrowabad (now a city), with 1,083 people.

=== Other villages in the rural district ===
- Ashtargarden
- Baghak
- Kamard
- Shamsabad
