= Khojir National Park =

Oldest wildlife reserve in Iran

Khojir National Park پارک ملی خجیر
- IUCN category II (national park)
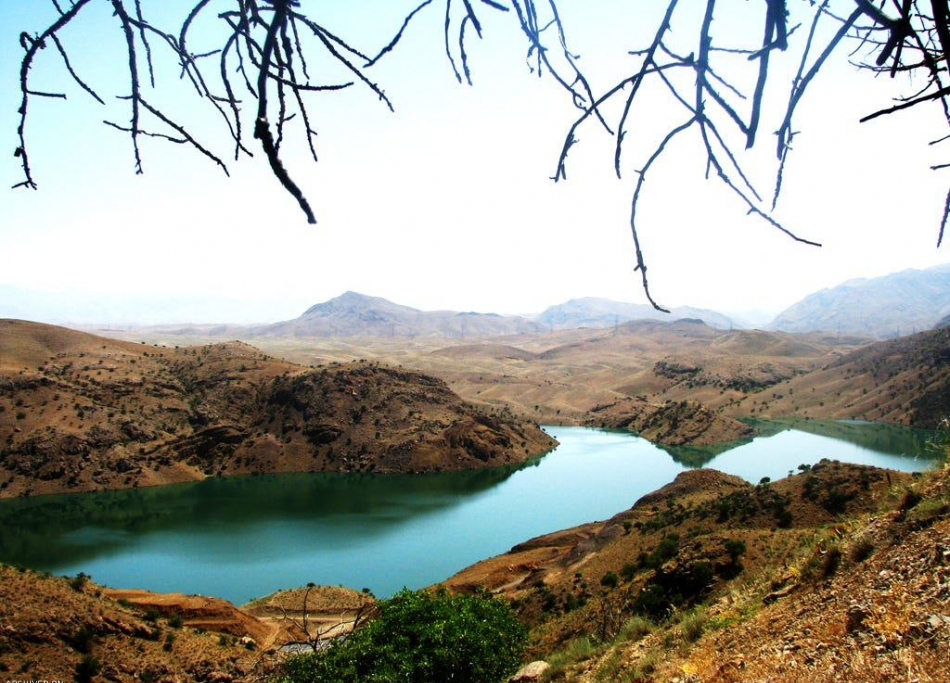
- Khojir National Park: Tehran Province

- Location within Iran
- Location: Iran
- Coordinates: 35.41°N 51.41°E
- Area: 99.71 km^{2} (38.50 sq mi)
- Established: 1982
- Governing body: Department of the Environment

Khojir National Park (Persian: پارک ملی خجیر) is the oldest protected area in Iran, located on the southern slopes of the Alborz Mountains east of Tehran in Tehran Province. It was established as a wildlife reserve in 1979 and promoted to national park in 1982. It covers 99.71 km^{2} (38.50 sq mi) in the Jajrood River basin and ranges in altitude from 1,200 to 2,200 m (3,900 to 7,200 ft).

== History ==
The area has been a royal game reserve since 1754 and was included in the Jajrood Protected Area in 1979.

The park contains within its confines the village of Khojir, and the "vast" Khojir missile production complex, which is owned by the Shahid Hemmat Industrial Group.

== Flora ==
Vegetation above 1,400 m (4,600 ft) comprises foremost Persian pistachio tree (Pistacia atlantica), wild almond (Prunus lycioides), interspersed with buckthorn (Rhamnus pallasi), Persian juniper (Juniperus excelsa), wild cherry (Prunus cerasus), and Cotoneaster bushes.

== Fauna ==
Persian leopard and Asiatic wildcat were recorded during camera-trapping surveys in the protected area since 2005, and a Pallas's cat for the first time in spring 2008.
