= Pardis Technology Park =

Pardis Technology Park (PTP) پارک فناوری پردیس
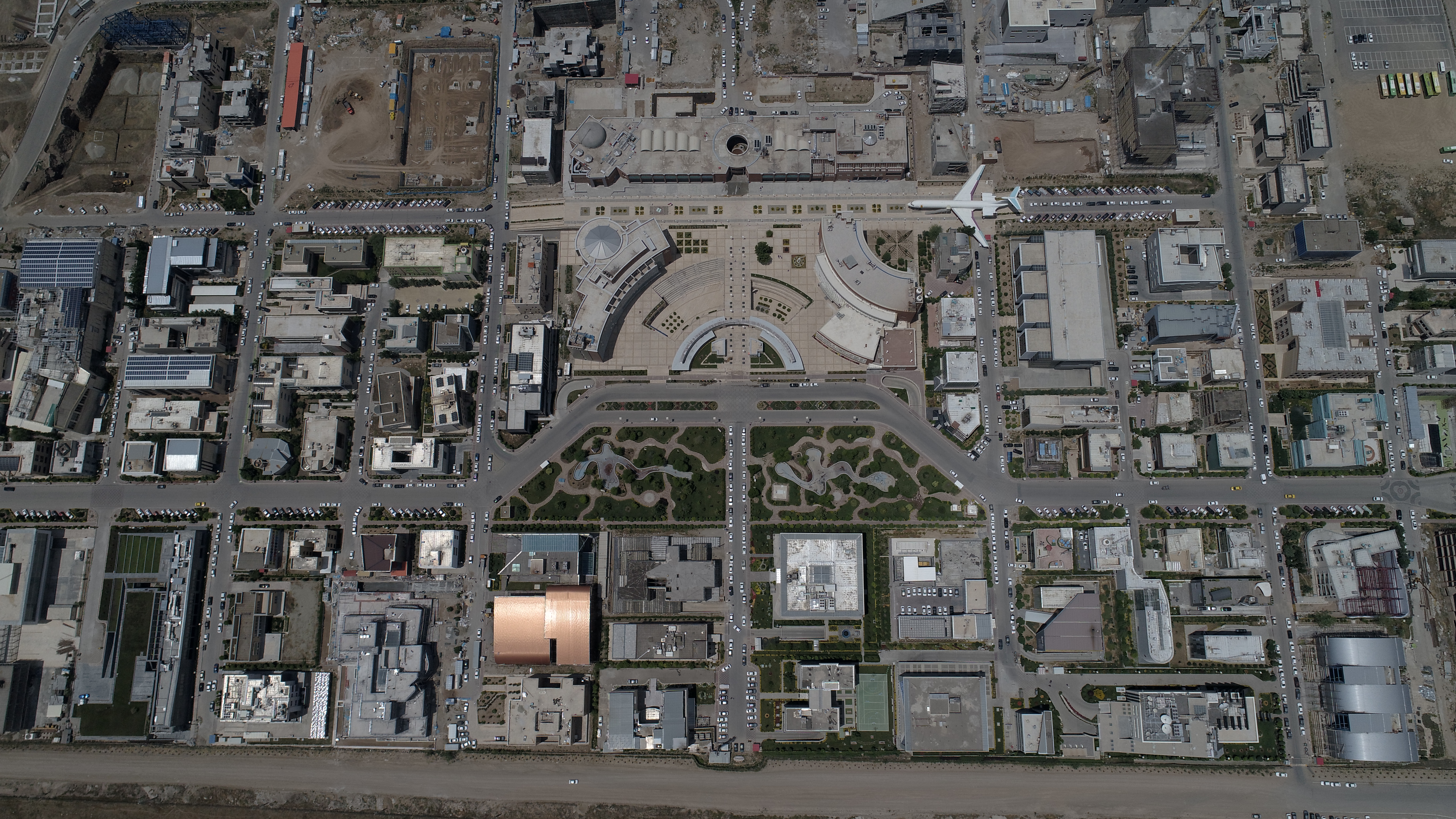
- A view of Pardis Technology Park, the self-proclaimed "Silicon Valley of Iran"

Project
- Opening date: 2001
- Size: 145 ha (360 acres)

Location
- Technology Park
- Interactive map of Pardis Technology Park
- Coordinates: 35°43′43″N 51°49′33″E
- Location: Pardis Town, Tehran province, Iran

Pardis Technology Park (PTP) (Persian: پارک فناوری پردیس) is under the auspices of the Vice-Presidency for Science and Technology. PTP is being directed by a board of trustees which has 14 members. Head of the board is first Vice President of Iran and includes legal members from ministries, science centers, and academies.

It is located in an area measuring 58 hectares (expandable to 1000 hectares) and is situated 20 km north east of Tehran.

- Innovation Paradise (phase No. 1),
- Knowledge Paradise (phase No. 2),
- and Entrepreneurship Paradise (phase No. 3)

are three main existing phases in the Park. Other phases constitute the future stages in the expansion plan of the park which will eventually measure up to 1000 hectares. By being situated within the 97 km neighborhood of Imam Khomeini Int'l Airport (IKIA), it is located alongside the main north–south and east–west passages to Europe, central Asia, ECO countries, Persian Gulf, and CIS countries. In addition to, technology Park is placed alongside the north–south fiber optics network and close neighborhood to scientific, research and academic centers and also four industrial zones, i.e. Khorram-dasht and Firouzkouh industrial zones.

== Objectives ==
The park describes its objectives as:

1. To intensify high-tech industries development.
2. To promote cooperation between industries academic institutions and research centers.
3. To create synergy between private and state sectors.
4. To commercialize know-how and innovations generated by research centers.
5. To promote research and development activities in private sector.

== Services ==
- Information & Communication technology Services
- Training and education
- Consulting, investing and marketing
- Banking, financing and insurance
- Laboratory and workshop
- Exhibition
- Housing and recreation
- Public welfare and environmental protection

== Establishment types for technology bodies at PTP ==
1. Technology Incubator Building: For start up companies, university graduates and entrepreneurs with specific ideas, and lack of financial resources and work experience.
2. Multi-Tenant Building (MTB): For those companies that have already started their businesses but, have restricted financial abilities and personnel.
3. Land plots: For those companies with relatively long commercial experience in the field of high technologies and, have their own laboratories, workshops, expertise and are enough able to invest and develop their commercial activities.

== Development phases ==
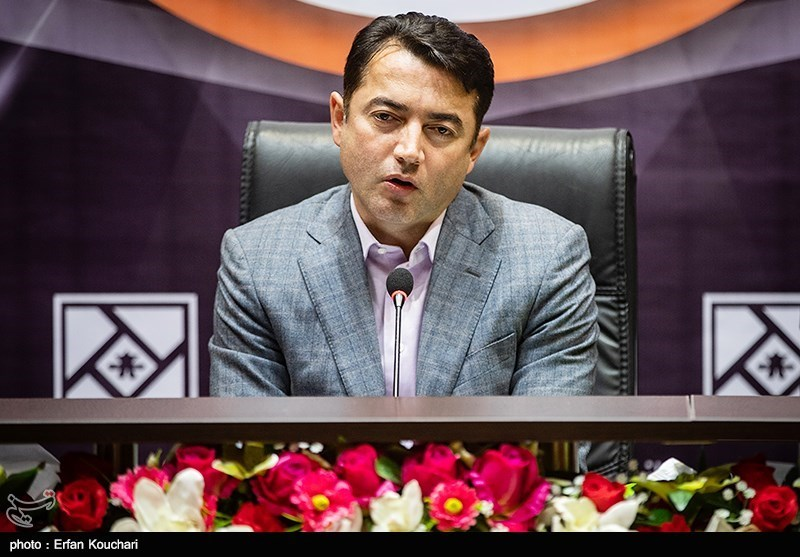
Pardis Mehr Housing press conference

Existing Phases:

1. Phase #1 – Innovation Pardis is located in a 20 hectares area
2. Phase #2 – Knowledge Pardis

Upcoming/in-development Phases:

1. Synergy Pardis
2. Creativity Pardis
3. Evolution Pardis
4. Development Pardis
5. Entrepreneurship Pardis
6. Productivity Pardis

== Data center ==
- Pars Online has established its first large-scale internet private data center in Iran, at Pardis Technology Park.

== See also ==
- Communications and ICT in Iran
- Science and technology in Iran
- Venture capital in Iran
