= Karasht Rural District =

Rural district in Tehran province, Iran

Karasht Rural District Persian: دهستان کرشت
- Rural District
- Location within Iran
- Coordinates: 35°42′N 51°49′E
- Country: Iran
- Province: Tehran
- County: Pardis
- District: Central
- Established: 2012
- Capital: Karasht

Population (2016)
  - Total: 5,237
- Time zone: UTC+3:30 (IRST)

Karasht Rural District (Persian: دهستان کرشت) is in the Central District of Pardis County, Tehran province, Iran. Its capital is the village of Karasht.

== History ==
In 2012, the cities of Bumahen and Pardis, and most of Siyahrud Rural District, were separated from Tehran County in the establishment of Pardis County. Karasht Rural District was created in the new Bumahen District. The rural district was separated from the district in forming the Central District in 2020.

== Demographics ==
=== Population ===
At the time of the 2016 census, the rural district's population was 5,237 in 1,650 households. The most populous of its 11 villages was Bagh-e Komesh, with 2,566 people, now the capital of Bagh-e Komesh Rural District.

=== Other villages in the rural district ===
- Vasfejan
