= Jajrud District =

District in Tehran province, Iran

Jajrud District Persian: بخش جاجرود
- District
- Location within Iran
- Coordinates: 35°41′N 51°46′E
- Country: Iran
- Province: Tehran
- County: Pardis
- Established: 2012
- Capital: Khosrowabad

Population (2016)
  - Total: 9,864
- Time zone: UTC+3:30 (IRST)

Jajrud District (Persian: بخش جاجرود) is in Pardis County, Tehran province, Iran. Its capital is the city of Khosrowabad.

The district includes areas within the Jajrud Protected Area, which hosts significant biodiversity. The region has experienced urbanization and development, with the establishment of industrial sites, mining, and the expansion of infrastructure. The Jajrud River, originating from the Alborz Mountains, flows through the district and is an important water source for both natural ecosystems and human activities. The local economy is based on traditional agriculture, industries and tourism.

== History ==
In 2012, the cities of Bumahen and Pardis, and most of Siyahrud Rural District, were separated from Tehran County in the establishment of Pardis County, which was divided into two districts of two rural districts each, with Pardis as its capital.

The villages of Khosrowabad and Saidabad-e Jajrud were converted to cities in 2020 and 2021, respectively.

== Demographics ==
=== Population ===
At the time of the 2016 National Census, the district's population was 9,864 inhabitants in 2,873 households.

=== Administrative divisions ===
Jajrud District Population
Administrative Divisions	2016
Jajrud RD	2,264
Saidabad RD	7,600
Khosrowabad (city) (Note: Became a city after the 2016 census)	
Saidabad-e Jajrud (city) (Note: Became a city after the 2016 census)	
Total	9,864
RD = Rural District

== Geography ==
The region encompasses rugged terrain in the foothills of the southern Alborz Mountains, with the Jajrud River draining through it. The topography varies from 1,480 m (4,860 ft) in valley towns to 2,050 m (6,730 ft) at the northern peak of Kūh‑e Jajrud. The region experiences a cold, dry mountainous climate with annual rainfall around 200 mm (7.9 in). The Jajrud River valley cuts through steep southern slopes and provides arable land and watercourses.

== Economy ==
The region's agriculture includes orchards and small-scale farming along river valley floors. Industrial activity focuses on mining and workshops including wood, metal, painting, and elevator production. Since the 2010s, enhanced residential demand has led to villa and plot development in suburban areas.

The Jajrud Valley served historically as a Qajar-era royal hunting ground, with hunting lodges and carriage roads dating to Fath‑ʿAlī Shah and Nāser‑al‑Dīn Shah. There is growing interest in ecotourism centered on the Jajrud River corridor for recreation. The river basin features religious pilgrimages and seasonal festivals, anchored in local customs and springs. Recreational trails along the river and dam areas support eco-transport and leisure walking.
