= Central District (Pardis County) =

District in Tehran province, Iran

Central District (Pardis County) Persian: بخش مرکزی شهرستان پردیس
- District
- Location within Iran
- Coordinates: 35°44′N 51°49′E
- Country: Iran
- Province: Tehran
- County: Pardis
- Established: 2020
- Capital: Pardis
- Time zone: UTC+3:30 (IRST)

The Central District of Pardis County (Persian: بخش مرکزی شهرستان پردیس) is in Tehran province, Iran. Its capital is the city of Pardis, whose population at the time of the 2016 National Census was 37,257 people in 11,051 households.

== History ==
In 2012, the cities of Bumahen and Pardis, and most of Siyahrud Rural District, were separated from Tehran County in the establishment of Pardis County, which was divided into two districts of two rural districts each, with Pardis as its capital.

In 2020, Karasht Rural District and Pardis were separated from Bumahen District in forming the Central District, which was divided into two rural districts, including the new Bagh-e Komesh Rural District.

== Demographics ==
=== Administrative divisions ===
Central District (Pardis County)
Administrative Divisions
Bagh-e Komesh RD
Karasht RD
Pardis (city)
RD = Rural District
