= Pardis =

City in Tehran province, Iran

Pardis Persian: پردیس
- City
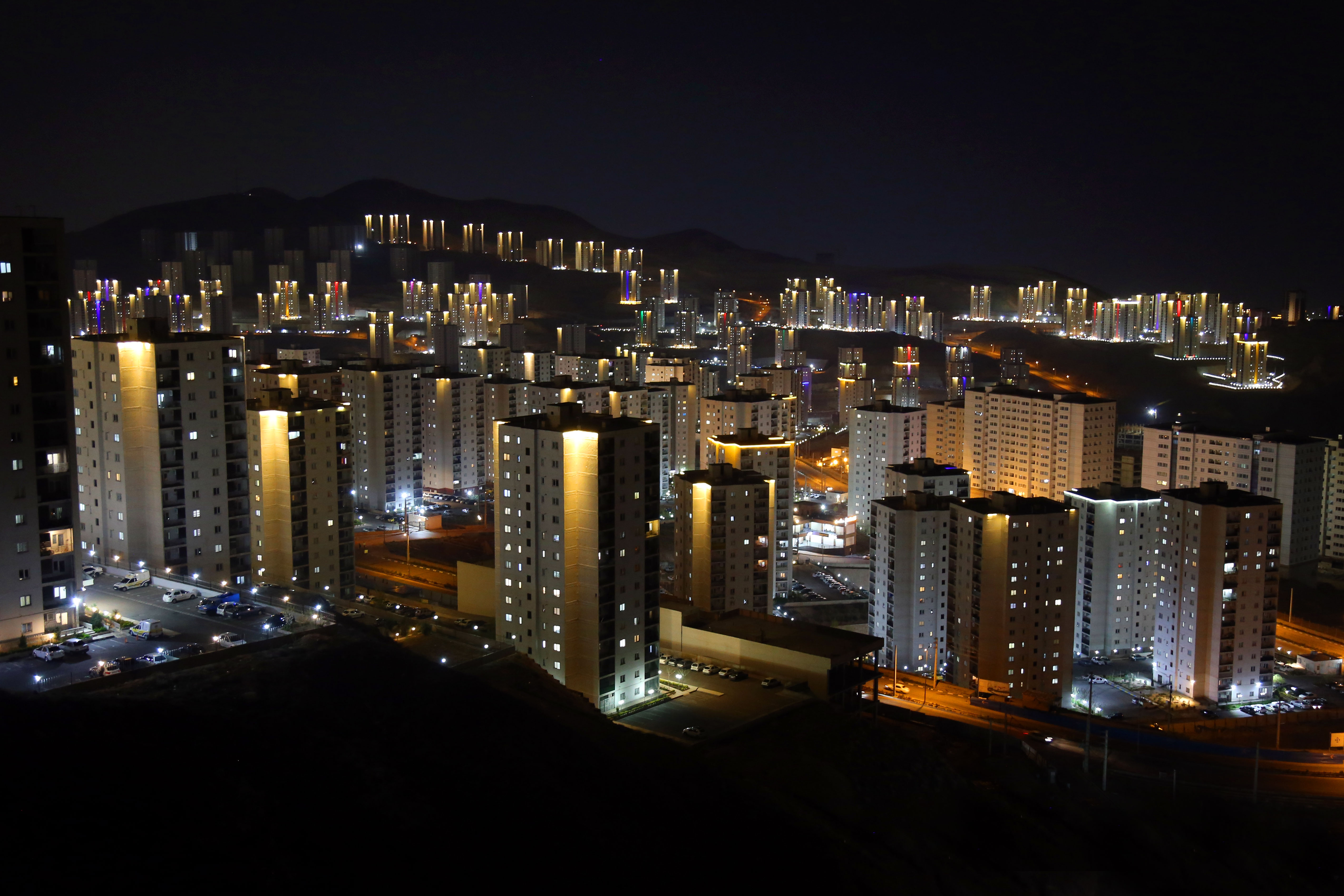
- Phase 11 in the city of Pardis

- Location within Iran
- Coordinates: 35°44′47″N 51°48′05″E
- Country: Iran
- Province: Tehran
- County: Pardis
- District: Central

Area
  - Total: 276.3 km^{2} (106.7 sq mi)
- Elevation: 1,700 to 2,100 m (5,600 to 6,900 ft)

Population (2016)
  - Total: 73,363
  - Density: 265.5/km^{2} (687.7/sq mi)
- Time zone: UTC+3:30 (IRST)

Pardis (Persian: پرديس) (Note: Also romanized as Pardīs; also known as Shahr-e Jadīd-e Pardīs (شهر جدید پردیس) (English: New City of Pardis)) is a city in the Central District of Pardis County, Tehran province, Iran, serving as capital of both the county and the district. It is a suburb located 17 km (11 mi) northeast of Tehran.

== Demographics ==
=== Population ===
At the time of the 2006 National Census, the city's population was 25,360 in 7,228 households, when it was in the Central District of Tehran County. The following census in 2011 counted 37,257 people in 11,051 households. The 2016 census measured the population of the city as 73,363 people in 23,938 households, by which time the city had been separated from the county in the establishment of Pardis County. Pardis was transferred to the new Bumahen District as the county's capital.

In 2020, Pardis was separated from Bumahen District in the establishment of the Central District.

== Gallery ==
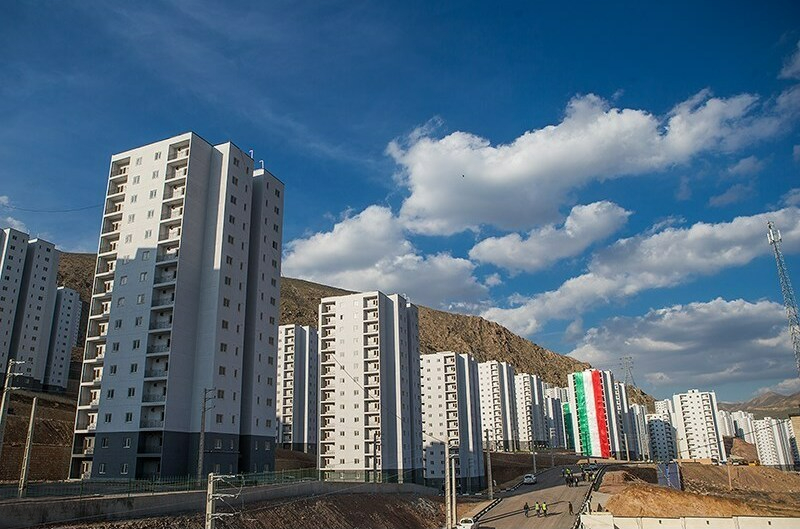
Mehr Housing, Pardis

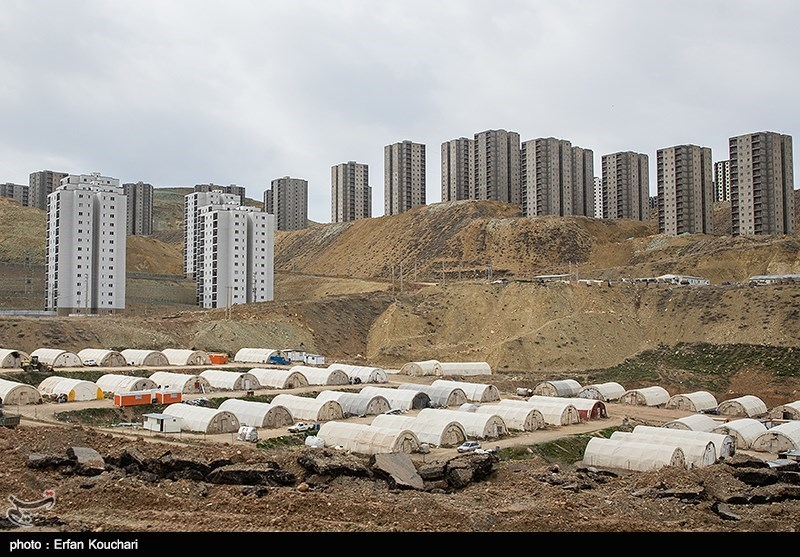
Mehr Housing, Pardis

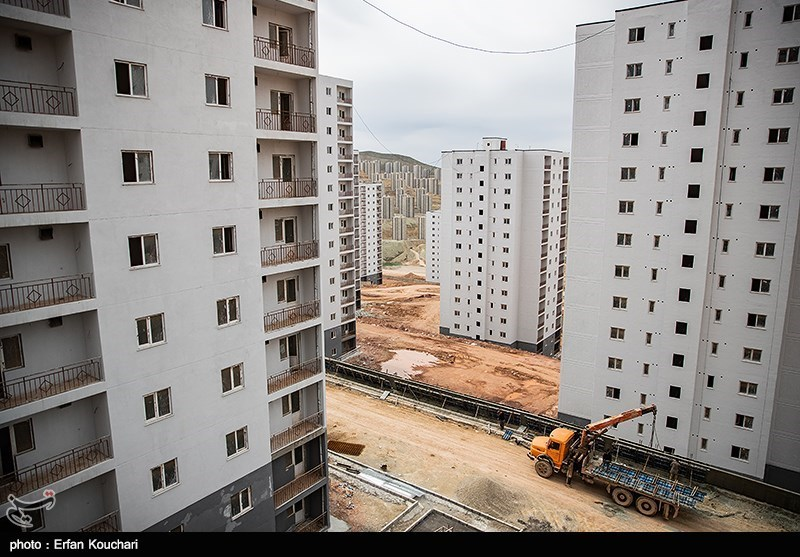
Mehr Housing, Pardis

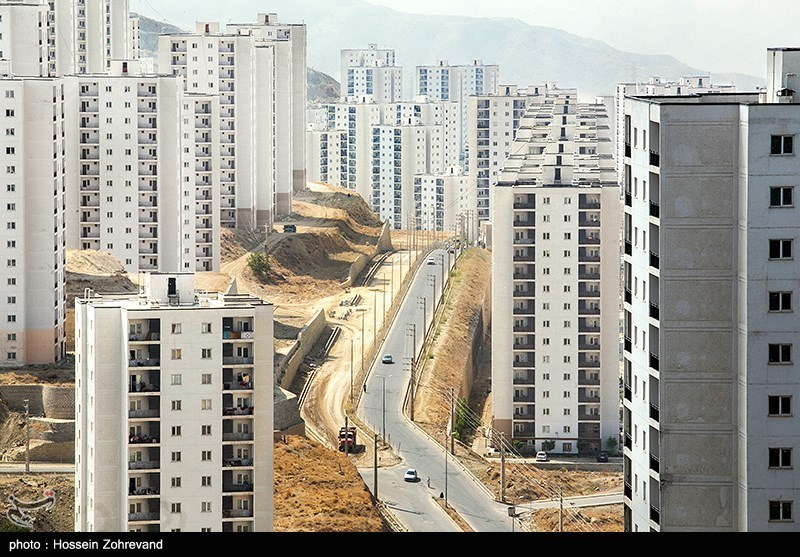
Maskan Mehr, Pardis

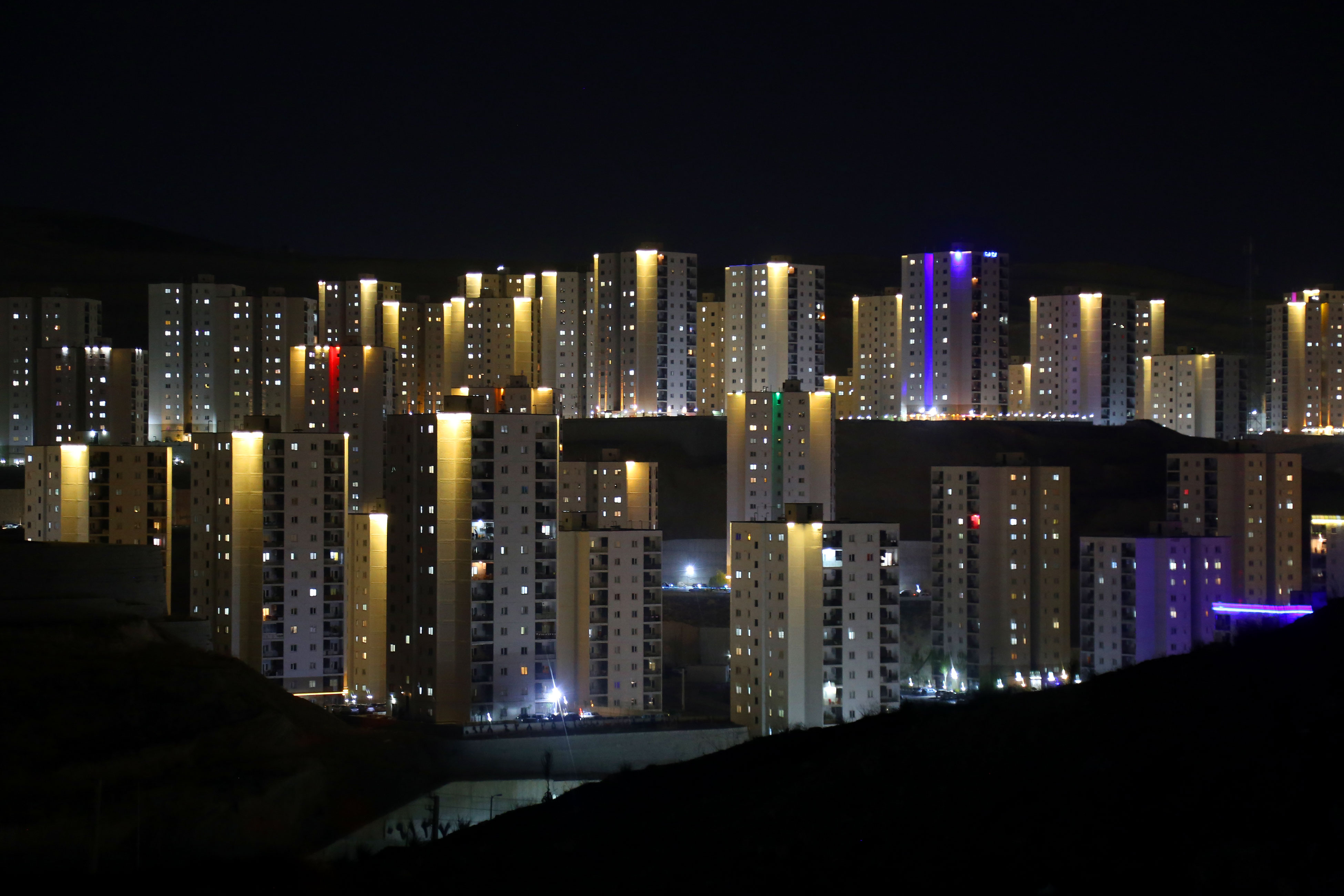
Phase 11, Pardis

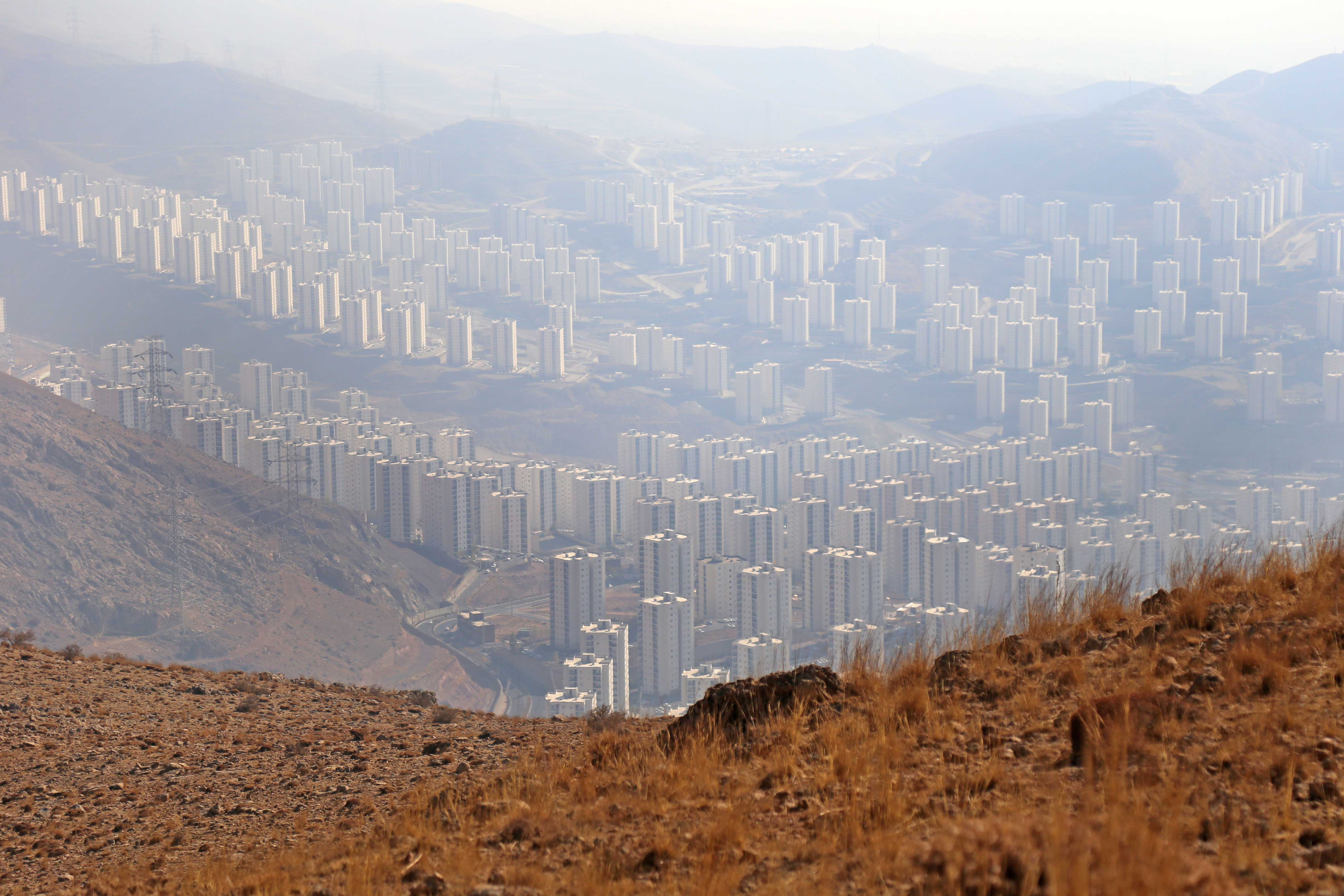
Phase 11, Pardis, Tehran

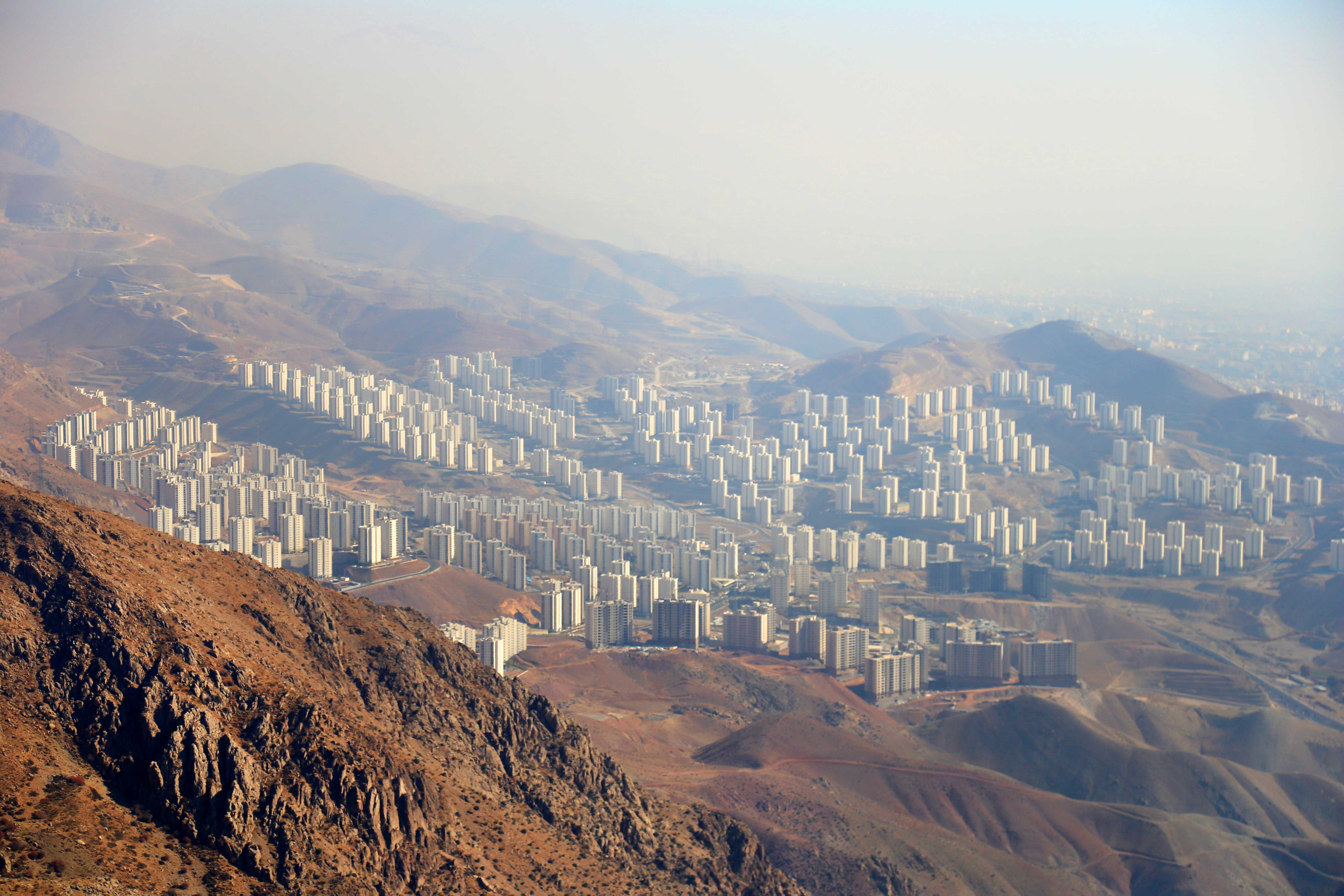
Phase 11, Pardis, Tehran

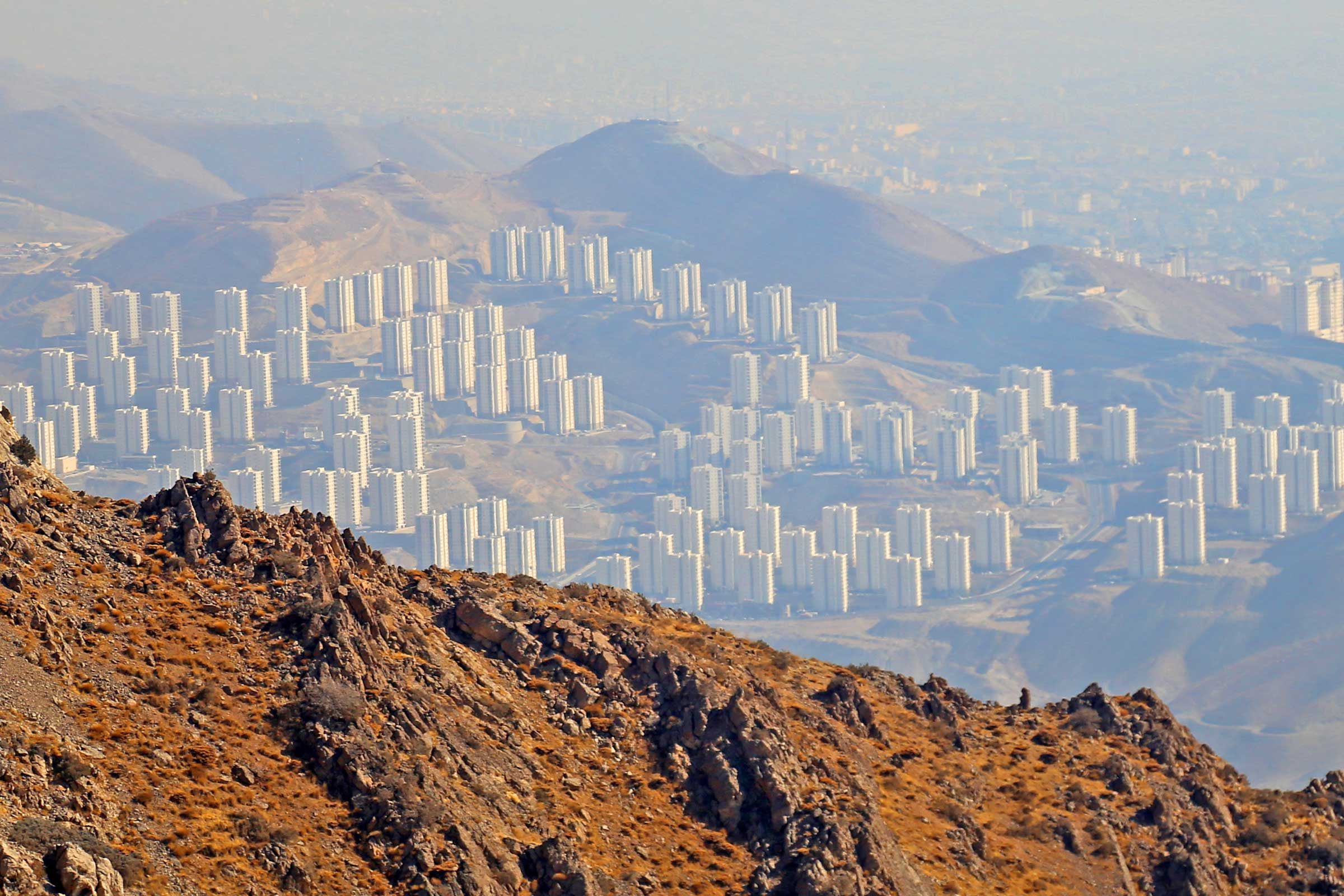
Phase 11, Pardis, Tehran

== See also ==
- Pardis Technology Park
