= Bumahen =

City in Tehran province, Iran

Bumahen Persian: بومهن
- City
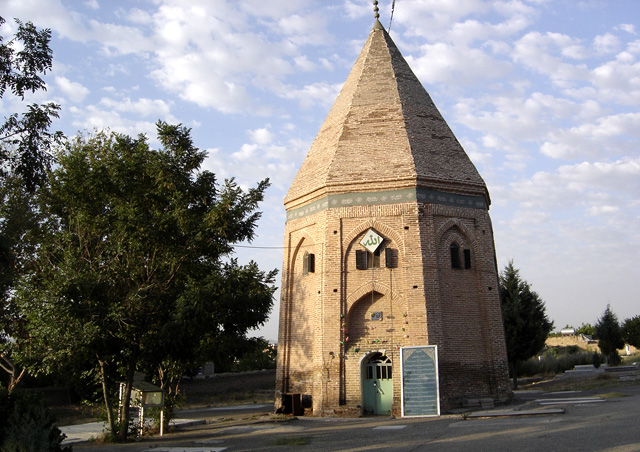
- The tomb of Sultan Mutahhar

- Location within Iran
- Coordinates: 35°43′56″N 51°52′02″E
- Country: Iran
- Province: Tehran
- County: Pardis
- District: Bumahen

Population (2016)
  - Total: 79,034
- Time zone: UTC+3:30 (IRST)

Bumahen (Persian: بومهن) (Note: Also romanized as Būmahen, Būm-e Hen, and Būmehen; also known as Būm Hend and Bumahind) is a city in, and the capital of, Bumahen District in Pardis County, Tehran province, Iran. It was previously the administrative center for Siyahrud Rural District until its capital was transferred to the village of Tellow-e Bala.

== Demographics ==
=== Population ===
At the time of the 2006 National Census, the city's population was 43,004 in 11,667 households, when it was in the Central District of Tehran County. The following census in 2011 counted 53,451 people in 15,729 households. The 2016 census measured the population of the city as 79,034 people in 24,385 households, by which time it had been separated from the county in the establishment of Pardis County. Bumahen was transferred to the new Bumahen District.
