= Bumahen District =

District in Tehran province, Iran

Bumahen District Persian: بخش بومهن
- District
- Location within Iran
- Coordinates: 35°41′N 51°51′E
- Country: Iran
- Province: Tehran
- County: Pardis
- Established: 2012
- Capital: Bumahen

Population (2016)
  - Total: 159,184
- Time zone: UTC+3:30 (IRST)

Bumahen District (Persian: بخش بومهن) is in Pardis County, Tehran province, Iran. Its capital is the city of Bumahen.

== History ==
In 2012, the cities of Bumahen and Pardis, and most of Siyahrud Rural District, were separated from Tehran County in the establishment of Pardis County, which was divided into two districts of two rural districts each, with Pardis as its capital.

In 2020, Taherabad Rural District was created in Bumahen District, and Karasht Rural District and Pardis were separated from it in forming the Central District.

== Demographics ==
=== Population ===
At the time of the 2016 National Census, Bumahen District's population was 159,184 inhabitants in 50,482 households.

=== Administrative divisions ===
Bumahen District Population
| Administrative Divisions | 2016 |
|---|---|
| Gol Khandan RD | 1,550 |
| Karasht RD (Note: Transferred to the Central District) | 5,237 |
| Taherabad RD (Note: Established after the 2016 census) | |
| Bumahen (city) | 79,034 |
| Pardis (city) | 73,363 |
| Total | 159,184 |
RD = Rural District
