= Pardis County =

County in Tehran province, Iran

Pardis County Persian: شهرستان پردیس
- County
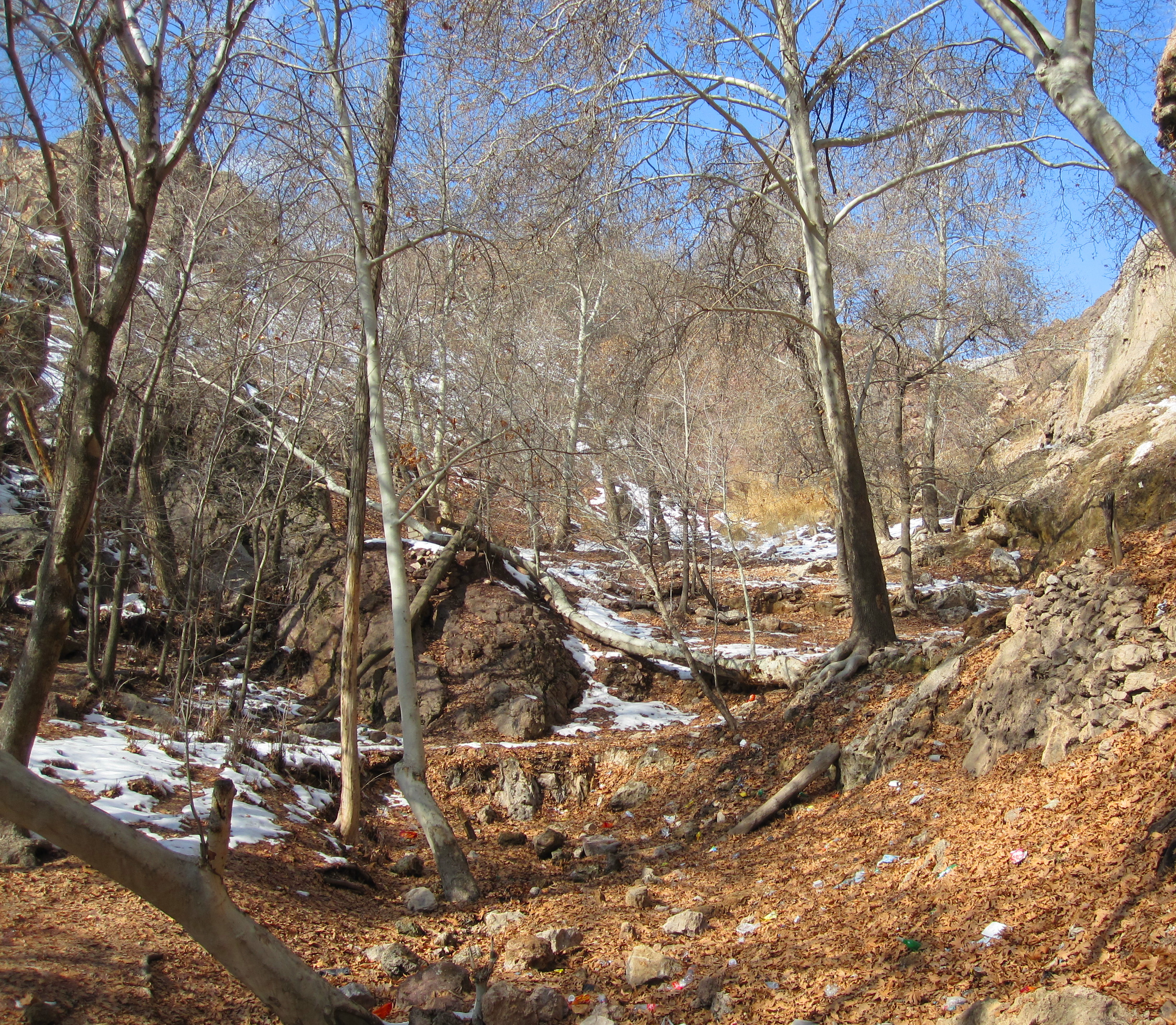
- Kamard Cascade Valley in Pardis County

- Location of Pardis County in Tehran province (top, purple)

- Location of Tehran province in Iran
- Coordinates: 35°41′N 51°49′E
- Country: Iran
- Province: Tehran
- Established: 2012
- Capital: Pardis
- Districts: Central, Bumahen, Jajrud

Area
  - Total: 276 km^{2} (107 sq mi)

Population (2016)
  - Total: 169,060
  - Density: 613/km^{2} (1,590/sq mi)
- Time zone: UTC+3:30 (IRST)

Pardis County (Persian: شهرستان پردیس) is in Tehran province, Iran. Its capital is the city of Pardis.

== History ==
In 2012, the cities of Bumahen and Pardis, and most of Siyahrud Rural District, were separated from Tehran County in the establishment of Pardis County, which was divided into two districts of two rural districts each, with Pardis as its capital.

In 2020, Taherabad Rural District was created in Bumahen District, and Karasht Rural District and Pardis were separated from it in forming the Central District, which was divided into two rural districts, including the new Bagh-e Komesh Rural District. The villages of Khosrowabad and Saidabad-e Jajrud were converted to cities in 2020 and 2021, respectively.

== Demographics ==
=== Population ===
At the time of the 2016 National Census, the county's population was 169,060 in 53,367 households.

=== Administrative divisions ===
Pardis County's population and administrative structure are shown in the following table.

Pardis County Population
Administrative Divisions	2016
Central District (Note: Established after the 2016 census)	
Bagh-e Komesh RD	
Karasht RD	
Pardis (city)	
Bumahen District	159,184
Gol Khandan RD	1,550
Karasht RD	5,237
Taherabad RD	
Bumahen (city)	79,034
Pardis (city)	73,363
Jajrud District	9,864
Jajrud RD	2,264
Saidabad RD	7,600
Khosrowabad (city) (Note: Became a city after the 2016 census)	
Saidabad-e Jajrud (city) (Note: Became a city after the 2016 census)	
Total	169,060
RD = Rural District

== Climate ==
According to the information of the State Meteorological Organization of Tehran province, the long-term average annual rainfall of Pardis is around 327.6 mm

== Economy ==
In the south of Pardis County around 5km from Bumahen is the Technology Park, where various R&D institutes and banking companies are located.

== See also ==
Media related to Pardis County at Wikimedia Commons
