= Central District (Tehran County) =

District in Tehran province, Iran

Central District (Tehran County) Persian: بخش مرکزی شهرستان تهران
- District
- Location within Iran
- Coordinates: 35°40′N 51°24′E
- Country: Iran
- Province: Tehran
- County: Tehran
- Established: 1987
- Capital: Tehran

Population (2016)
  - Total: 8,699,284
- Time zone: UTC+3:30 (IRST)

The Central District of Tehran County (Persian: بخش مرکزی شهرستان تهران) is in Tehran province, Iran. Its capital is the city of Tehran.

== History ==
In 2012, the cities of Bumahen and Pardis, and most of Siyahrud Rural District, were separated from the district in the establishment of Pardis County.

== Demographics ==
=== Population ===
At the time of the 2006 National Census, the district's population was 7,796,431 in 2,291,668 households. The following census in 2011 counted 8,262,262 people in 2,629,653 households. The 2016 census measured the population of the district as 8,699,284 inhabitants in 2,912,511 households.

=== Administrative divisions ===
Central District (Tehran County) Population
Administrative Divisions	2006	2011	2016
Siyahrud RD (Note: Most transferred to Pardis County)	16,837	17,503	5,578
Bumahen (city) (Note: Transferred to Pardis County)	43,004	53,451	
Pardis (city)	25,360	37,257	
Tehran (city)	7,711,230	8,154,051	8,693,706
Total	7,796,431	8,262,262	8,699,284
RD = Rural District
