= Siyahrud Rural District (Tehran County) =

Rural district in Tehran province, Iran

Siyahrud Rural District Persian: دهستان سياهرود
- Rural District
- Location within Iran
- Coordinates: 35°42′N 51°37′E
- Country: Iran
- Province: Tehran
- County: Tehran
- District: Central
- Established: 1987
- Capital: Tellow-e Bala

Population (2016)
  - Total: 5,578
- Time zone: UTC+3:30 (IRST)

Siyahrud Rural District (Persian: دهستان سياهرود) is in the Central District of Tehran County, Tehran province, Iran. Its capital is the village of Tellow-e Bala. The rural district was previously administered from the city of Bumahen.

== Demographics ==
=== Population ===
At the time of the 2006 National Census, the rural district's population was 16,837 in 4,881 households. There were 17,503 inhabitants in 5,142 households at the following census of 2011. The 2016 census measured the population of the rural district as 5,578 in 1,446 households, by which time most of the rural district had been separated from the district in the establishment of Pardis County. The most populous of its 21 villages was Mesgarabad, with 2,265 people.

=== Other villages in the rural district ===
- Hajarabad
- Hameh Sin
- Sanjarian
- Sorkheh Hesar
- Yurd-e Shad
