= Iran–Palestine relations =

- Iran: Palestine

Diplomatic mission
- Embassy of Iran, Amman: Embassy of the State of Palestine, Tehran

Envoy
- TBD: Ambassador Salam al-Zawawi

The Islamic Republic of Iran officially recognises Palestine as a state. Ali Khamenei, the former Supreme Leader of Iran, rejected a two-state solution and implied that Palestine is inseparable, while Iran's former President Mahmoud Ahmadinejad called for a free referendum for the entire Palestinian population, including Arab citizens of Israel, to determine the type of government in the future Palestinian State, while reiterating that establishment of a Palestinian State alongside Israel would "never mean an endorsement of the Israeli occupation".

Prior to the 1979 Iranian Revolution, the Palestine Liberation Organization (PLO) held close ties with Iranian opposition groups. Following the revolution, Iran ended its alliance with Israel and started supporting the Palestinians, symbolized by turning over the Israeli embassy in Tehran to the PLO.

== Before the Iranian Revolution ==
Iran was the second majority Muslim nation after Turkey to grant (de facto) recognition of Israel, under the rule of Mohammad Reza Pahlavi, the last Shah of Iran.

== After the 1979 Iranian Revolution ==
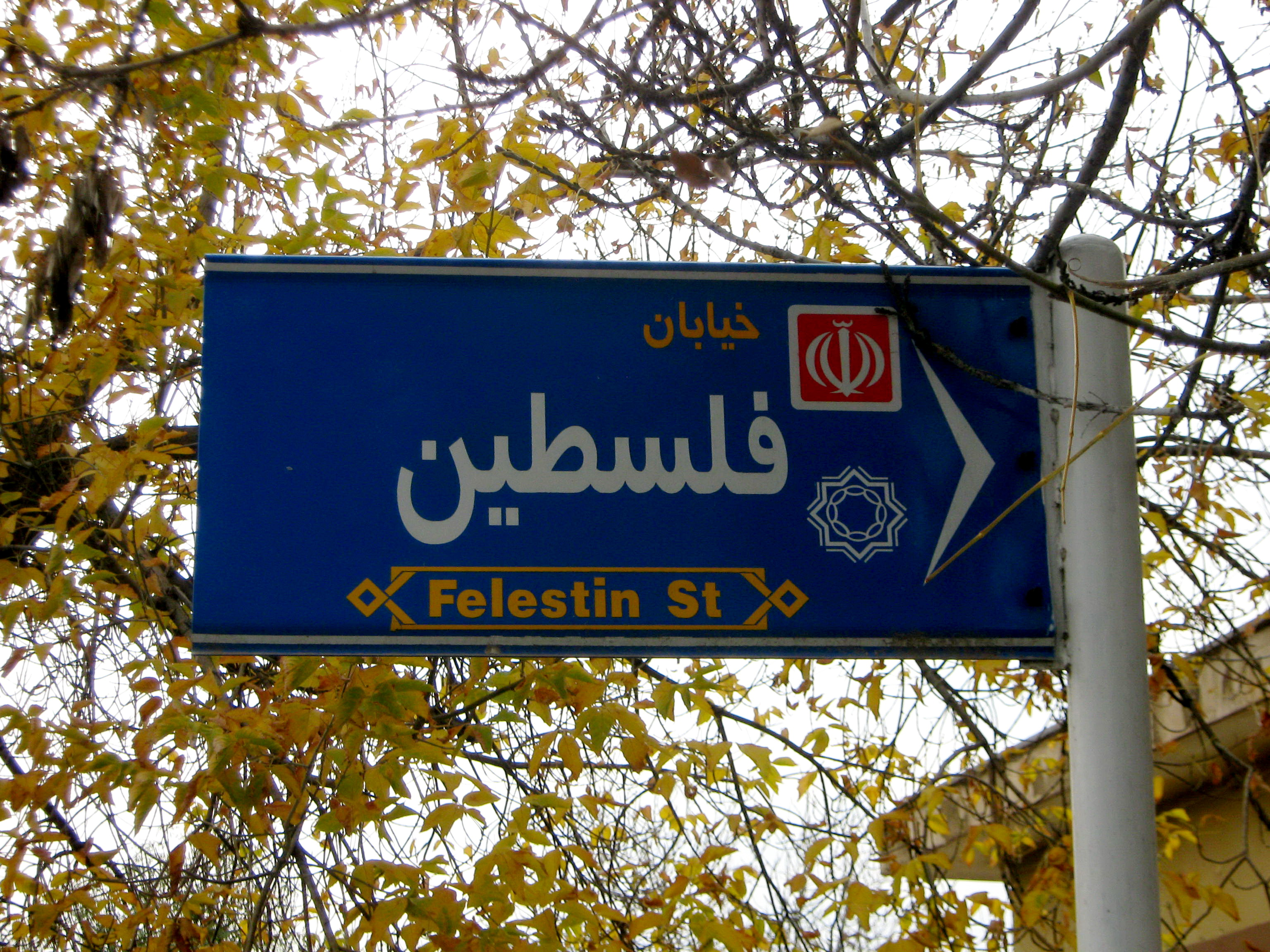
A street named Palestine in Iranian city of Nishapur

The PLO backed the 1979 revolution, and several days after the revolution, PLO chief Yasser Arafat led a Palestinian delegation to Iran, where he and the rest of his Palestinian delegates were publicly welcomed and received a commitment from Ayatollah Khomeini that Iran would promptly "turn to the issue of victory over Israel," while an "exultant" Arafat cited how the revolution in Iran had "turned upside down" the area's strategic balance, including through the PLO's support of Iranian opposition groups. The Palestinian delegation was symbolically handed the keys to the former Israeli embassy in Tehran, which later became a Palestinian embassy.

== Relations during the Intifada ==
After the eruption of the second Palestinian intifada, in September 2000 after the collapse of Middle East peace talks at Camp David, Arafat released imprisoned Hamas and Islamic Jihad militants, a decision that restored the relations between Iran and the Palestinian National Authority. The renewed support became evident when Israeli commandos captured the Karine A in 2002, a ship carrying 50 tons of advanced weaponry from Iran to Gaza.

== Support for Hamas ==
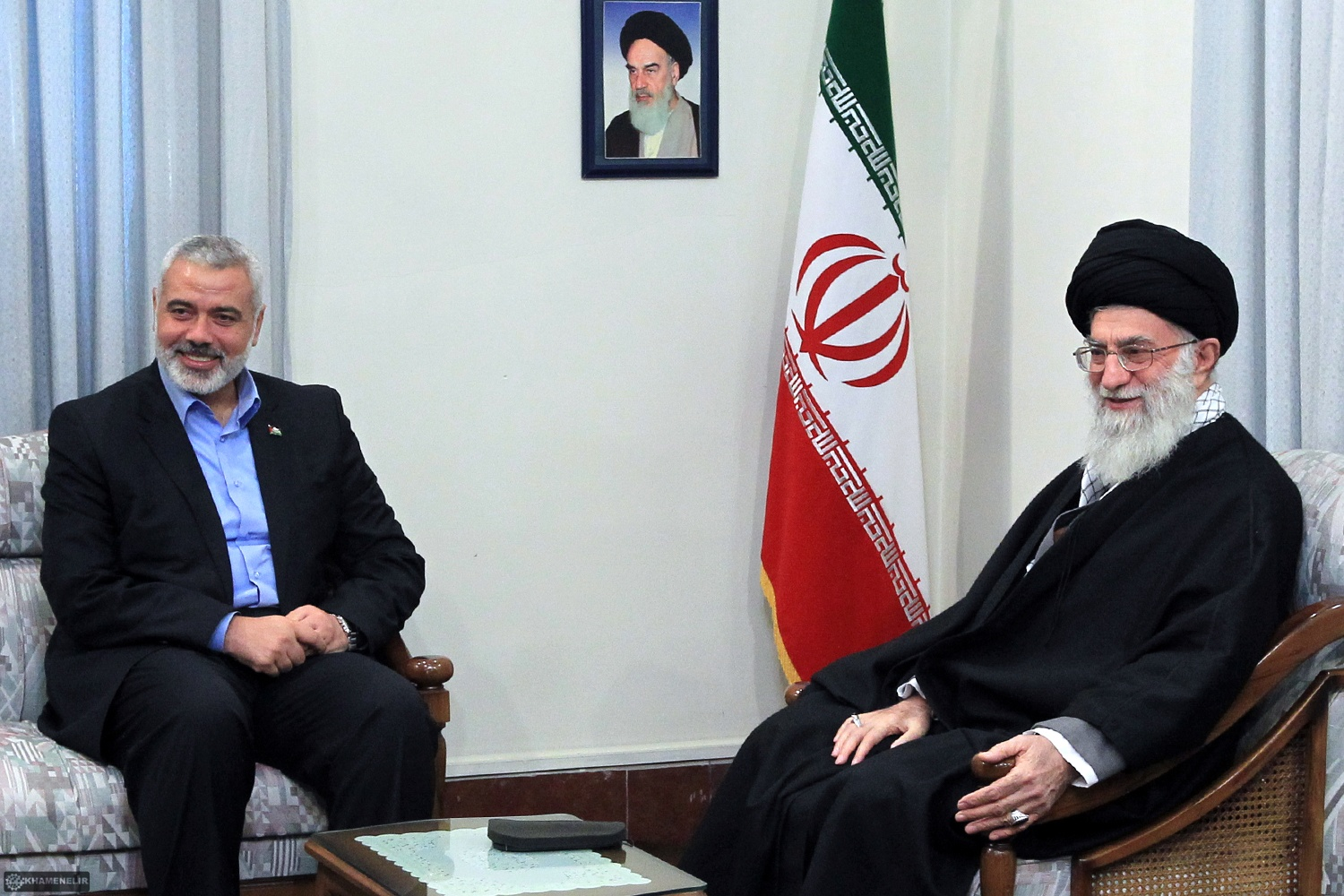
Hamas leader Ismail Haniyeh and Iranian Supreme Leader Ali Khamenei in 2012.

Hamas is a military and political organization currently in power in the Gaza Strip. According to Mahmoud Abbas, President of the Palestinian National Authority, "Hamas is funded by Iran. It claims it is financed by donations, but the donations are nothing like what it receives from Iran. Iran also supplies Hamas with military weaponry; technologies provided include Fajr-5, M-75, and M-302 rockets, as well as drones.

Aid to Hamas increased after Arafat’s death in 2004 and Israel’s withdrawal from Gaza in 2005. Following the Hamas victory in the 2006 Palestinian elections, foreign aid dried up, leading Tehran to send significant financial aid to support the nearly bankrupt, Hamas-led Palestinian National Authority.

In July 2015, a senior Hamas official reported that the organization was no longer receiving aid from Iran, possibly due to Hamas's support for the rebels in the Syrian Civil War, as well as its improving relations with Saudi Arabia.

== Palestinian Authority officials' opinion ==
Palestinian Authority spokesman Nabil Abu Rudeineh has said of former Iranian President Mahmoud Ahmadinejad that "The one who does not represent the Iranian people, who falsified election results, who oppressed the Iranian people and stole authority has no right to speak about Palestine, its president or its representatives".

In September 2010, former Iranian President Mahmoud Ahmadinejad said that the peace talks in Washington would not achieve their goals, because Hamas is the true representative of the Palestinian people, among other reasons. PA officials responded to these Iranian statements with "unprecedented ferocity". Omar Al-Ghoul replied that the time had come to put an end to Iran's "regime of death and destruction." Fatah spokesman Osama Al-Qawasmi said that Iran is striving to divide Palestine, to spark civil wars and sectarian and ethnic strife in numerous Arab regions, and therefore it cannot benefit the Palestinian people.

== Tensions in 2024 ==
On 3 April 2024, the ruling Fatah party released a statement opposing Iranian involvement in Palestinian affairs, asserting that "this external interference, particularly by Iran, has no other objective than to sow chaos in the Palestinian internal arena, which will only benefit the Israeli occupation and the enemies of our people".

On 3 June 2024, Khamenei stated that the 2023 Hamas-led attack on Israel was "necessary for the region" due to plans "by the US, Zionist individuals, their followers, and some of the region's countries to change the equation in the region," describing the attack as "a huge blow to Israel." This statement was criticized by Palestinian President Mahmoud Abbas, who said Khamenei's remarks "clearly announce that their goal is to sacrifice the blood of Palestinians and thousands of children, women, and the elderly, and to destroy Palestinian land," adding that the Iranian policies "do not serve the Palestinian national goals of liberating Jerusalem."

== See also ==
- Iran–Israel relations
- International Conference on Supporting Palestine Intifada
