= Society for the Defence of Palestinian Nation =

Iranian anti-Zionist organization

Society for the Defence of Palestinian Nation or S.D.P.N is a non-governmental organization in Iran that has made the main topic of its activities the "defense of the oppressed Palestinian people against the oppression of Israel and the western domination system".

According to Article 13 of the constitution of the "Society for the Defence of Palestinian Nation", the mission of this society is to protect the principles, values and ideals of Ruhollah Khomeini and the leader of Iran Ali Khamenei regarding Palestine as a common goal of the Islamic nation and to support the struggles of the Palestinian nation.

== History ==
On the eve of International Quds Day in 2000, the "Society for the Defence of Palestinian Nation" declared its existence as a non-governmental organization in Iran with the efforts of a group of sympathizers, concerned and interested in Palestinian issues and resistance. According to the third article of the constitution, the mission of the community is to "pursue the demands of the Palestinian people" in international forums for the realization of the "material and spiritual rights of the Palestinian nation" and the trial of "Zionist criminals" in competent forums and to confront the "conspiracies of global Zionism" and its international supporters, especially the American government.

== Goals ==
The "Society for the Defence of Palestinian Nation" makes every effort to achieve the following goals:

- Liberation of the holy Quds;
- Empowering the Palestinian people to return to their homeland;
- The formation of an independent Palestinian government based on the will of the Palestinians, including Muslims, Christians and Jews;
- Attracting the support of the people of Iran and the world and governments, and pursuing the demands of the Palestinian people in international forums to achieve their material and moral rights;
- Prosecuting Zionist criminals in competent authorities and confronting the conspiracies of the international supporters of the Zionist regime, especially the US government and global Zionism;

== Statutes ==
According to its statute, the "Society for the Defence of Palestinian Nation" operates in four areas: Palestine, Zionism, the Zionist regime, and the Resistance Front, and has declared its theoretical and practical foundations as follows:

- The Palestinian issue is not an "Israeli-Palestinian conflict" or an "Arab-Israeli conflict" or an "Arab-Jewish conflict," but rather a full-scale war between the "oppressed" of the world and international Zionism on the soil of Palestine.
- Zionism is not only unrelated to Judaism, but also to any religion. It is a secular movement that strives to dominate the economic and political arteries of the human world.
- Israel is only one of the projects of international Zionism aimed at completing its domination over the Islamic world, and international Zionism cannot be summarized in any way in the Zionist regime.
- Resistance and struggle are the only way to save the oppressed of the world from the evil of international Zionism and its agents.

== See also ==
- Reactions in Iran to the Gaza War (2008-2009)
- The law countering the hostile actions of the Zionist regime against peace and security
- Death to Israel
- Israel won't exist in 25 years
- Operations attributed to Israel in Iran
- Operation Tyre
- Ahmad Qasir
- Fathi Razem
- Office of Literature and Art of Resistance
