= Office of Literature and Art of Resistance =

Iranian government institution

- دفتر ادبیات و هنر مقاومت
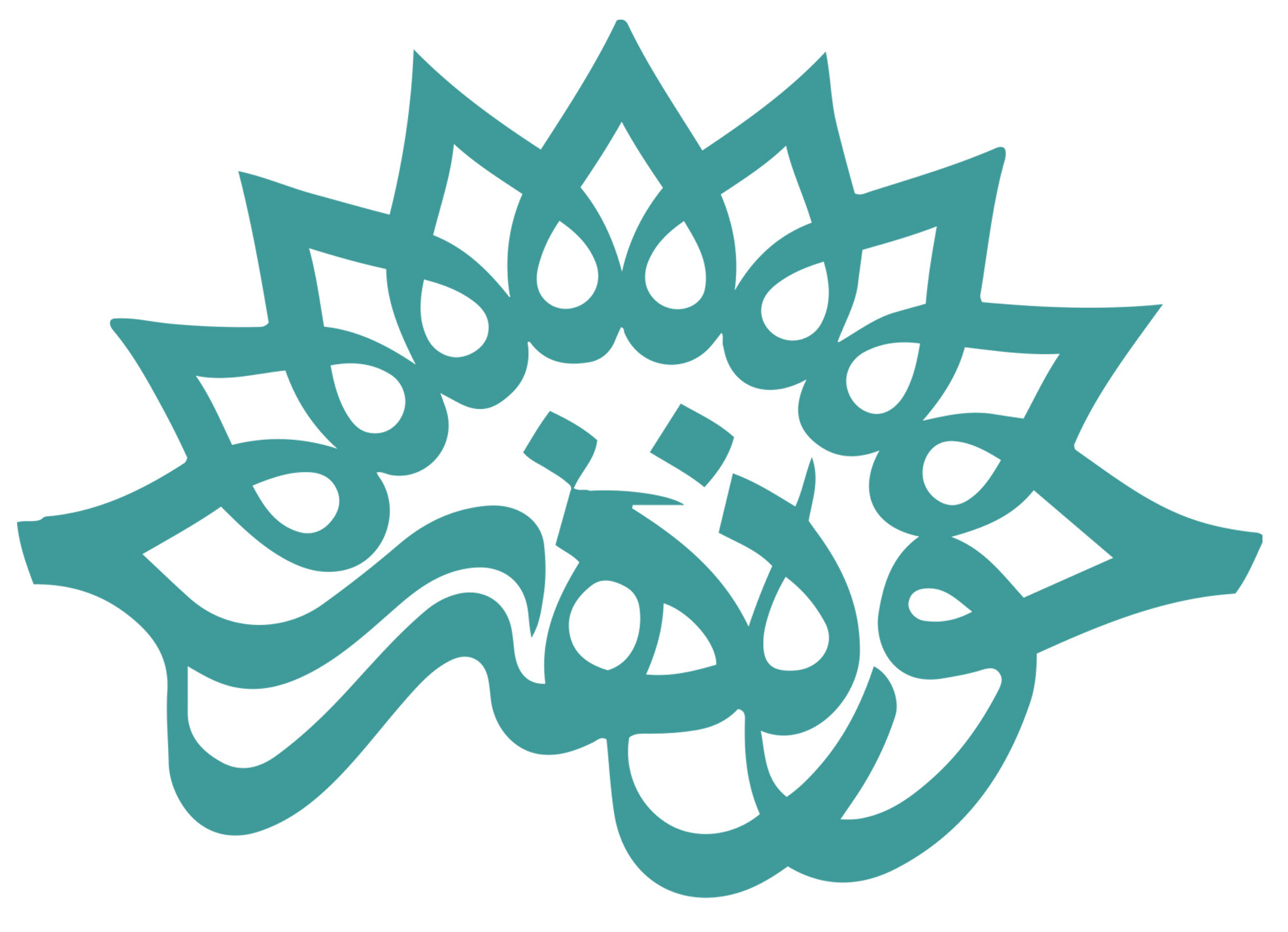

Agency overview
- Formed: 1988; 38 years ago
- Type: Cultural institution, book publishing
- Jurisdiction: Iran
- Headquarters: Tehran
- Agency executive: Morteza Sarhangi
- Parent agency: Islamic Development Organization
- Website: hozehonari.ir

The Office of Literature and Art of Resistance (Persian: دفتر ادبیات و هنر مقاومت) also known as Resistance's Office of Literature and Art of the Artistic Sect is a government institution in Iran. established in December 1988 during The Artistic Sect of the Islamic Republic as a branch of the Islamic Development Organization. It collects, compiles, and publishes literary, artistic, historical, research works.

== History ==
The organization began its activities in December 1988. Its activities include book publishing in the Artistic Sect of the Islamic Republic complex. It also compiles and publishes literary, artistic, and research works; as well as memoirs left behind by the Iranian people's eight-year defense period of the Iran–Iraq War.

The organization has produced a collection of 565 book titles and 5 quarterly issues. It has also published programs and expert opinions, lectures and interviews.

Many of the office's works have been met with public acclaim and have been republished over the years. The organization has also received various awards and certificates of appreciation from various circles, festivals, and ceremonies.

== Units ==
As the volume of the office's activities grew, the specialized and thematic units gradually took on a more tangible form, and various sub-branches such as "Women" and "Veterans" were added to them, or their activities were stopped after a period of time. Now, in addition to the independent expertise of individuals, the following units pursue the office's major specialized activities:

=== Research Unit ===
In parallel with the establishment of the office, the research department also began its activities. The first step of this department was the acceptance and preliminary implementation of the plan to compile "Front Culture". Since then, more than 27 book titles and 5 issues of the quarterly journal "Book of Resistance" have been published in this office in various fields of research on culture, literature, and history of Iran–Iraq War, as well as references such as dictionaries, lists, and documents, which have in a way formed the structure of the office's past research body.

Now, the "Research Unit" has made comprehensive, serious, and scientific research in the field of cultural, literary, and social studies of the Iran–Iraq War, and is trying to achieve its intended goals by designing and conducting fundamental studies to acquire research methods and problematization and find appropriate scientific solutions. The collection of articles "Nam Avard", the first volume of which was published in 2001, as well as the recent translated works of this unit - "In the Realm of Mourning and Memory", "War Discourse in the Media and the Language of Literature", and "Memory and War Discourse" - are among these.

Also, participating in scientific and academic meetings and conferences related to the Iran-Iraq War and the Iranian Islamic Revolution of 1979, holding meetings and inviting university professors and experts to discuss and dialogue on these topics, conducting scientific interviews about various aspects of the Iran-Iraq War and organizing and refining them in accordance with the latest standards of academic books, striving to prepare and write scientific research articles and accept research projects related to the Iran-Iraq War for the master's degree or review and study them, advising and accompanying in the preparation and compilation of academic theses on the subject of Iran-Iraq War, participating in the preparation and writing of academic course materials at different levels of postgraduate education, are other main activities of the experts in this unit.

=== Memories Unit ===
The main activity of the office from the beginning to the present has been the collection, compilation and publication of the Iran-Iraq War memoirs and notes. The collection of memoirs that leads to the publication of books in this field includes the study of personalities, executive follow-ups, numerous visits and interviews, recording tapes and compiling the work, numerous editing and proofreading, and finally, the expert review and preparation of the works for publication. It is worth noting that many of these works take more than a year to reach the printing stage, and the results of the work may be published in the coming years. The publication of 206 titles of the book "Memoirs of the Front and War" (of which 55 titles are dedicated to "Memoirs of the Iraqis"), 25 titles of "Notes and Manuscripts", 78 titles of "Memoirs of the Freedmen", which is a shining manifestation of sustainable literature and a vehicle for the growth and development of the office, is unique in its kind.

The office's current programs in publishing "oral" and "written" memoirs, drawing on valuable past experiences and relying on research findings, have provided the groundwork for the "oral history" of the war to find a suitable and ready-made platform for writing and publishing. The book "Bemo" and recent memoirs of commanders and notables of the war, such as "Chezabeh", "Battle of Draluk", "Bordering on Fire", "Moonless Nights" and "The Man Who Didn't Dream", and more recently the books "Category One", "The Lonely Roads of War" and "I Wrote to Last" are among them.

=== Women's Unit ===
The importance of the role and presence of women in the hidden and obvious layers of every historical event is not hidden from anyone. Now, more than twenty years after the end of the Iran-Iraq War, the obvious and hidden aspects of this presence have not yet been properly identified and narrated. To this end, one of the important parts of this office's activities is to identify, select, and invite women who played a role in the war, and then collect and systematically compile their memories, which has been concentrated in a separate unit since August 2000.

The office has so far published 29 books of memoirs, notes, and poems by women or on the topics of "Women and War," including th famous book "Beside the Khin River". Also, the unit's recent book series, such as "Last Sunday," "Gol Simin," and "Da," are notable for their different methods and content.

=== Child and Adolescent Unit ===
Since its establishment, the office has paid special attention to children and adolescents as the future builders of Iran. So far, 110 book titles on various topics for this age group, such as war memoirs, poetry, stories, letters, information, etc., have been published in the office. Among them, 17 volumes of "Bombing Nights," 20 volumes of "Commanders' Stories," and 11 volumes of the "Tales of the War City" collection are original and influential works in their own right, and have attracted public attention and acclaim.

The "Child and Adolescent Unit" has been operating in a centralized and independent manner since 1994, and now, in addition to reviewing the works submitted to this unit, it is a suitable platform for writing some books on the aforementioned topics.

=== Remembrance Night Ceremony ===
The "Night of Memory" ceremony has a special place in the innovative programs of this office. The first program of this ceremony was held in 1993. To prepare for this ceremony, which is usually held on the first Thursday of every month, 2.5 hours before the Maghrib prayer in the "Thought Hall" of the Artistic Sect of the Islamic Republic, requires a lot of follow-up in inviting famous and unknown people with memories and capable performers, and appropriate preparations, and recording and archiving the programs.

Side activities in this ceremony include preparing and broadcasting movies, documentaries, and visual narratives among the programs, performing hymns, plays, and music concerts, and preparing competitions, etc. Also, preparing a video report of veterans staying home and broadcasting their memories at the ceremony is another program prepared by the experts of this unit.

So far, 177 "Night of Memory" programs have been held over the years, which have been an oral form of storytelling and a platform for establishing direct communication with the audience and the general public. Among the programs of this ceremony, a number of them have been prepared and compiled in the form of a compact disc (CD), which can be obtained through the program office. Recently, with the cooperation of the Iranian Broadcasting Corporation, some of these programs will be presented for television broadcast.

=== War Library ===
Since September 2000, the "War Library" has been established and has so far, with appropriate scientific growth and the collection of more than 11,000 volumes of Persian and foreign books, specialized war journals and special issues, pamphlets, theses, and compact discs - more than 95 percent of which are dedicated to the "Iran-Iraq War" and the rest to other wars - it has been able to take an effective step in "specialized war librarianship and information." This library is considered one of the specialized and research libraries and recently, in the same group, it has received the "International Standard Library Number" (ISIL), which shows its serious commitment to the cause of national librarianship.

Establishing a standard library system and consequently identifying, collecting, preparing and compiling all works in the field of war, wars and Iran-Iraq War, lending works to patrons and members, communicating and interacting with other libraries, publishers and cultural and research centers, developing the library in mechanizing work, attracting facilities and creating appropriate platforms and upgrading software and hardware, consulting and guidance, and preparing subject lists for patrons and audiences, which has been achieved by spending a lot of time and various expertise, are among the programs carried out and are being pursued by the "War Library".

The project of creating the "War Library Classification" of WLC, a special web database, the preparation of "war librarianship" references, innovative and scientific methods in preparing "bibliographies" and "guides" on the subject of war, various consultations regarding book selection festivals and sending information items to the homes of members, researchers, and research and publishing centers in Tehran and the cities, and continuous communication with these centers, are among the noteworthy activities of this library. Recently, the publication of the book "Eight Notes on War Books and Librarianship" on the eighth anniversary of the establishment of this library is considered a serious step to consolidate its research programs.

This library accepts members for book lending, use of databases, and various consultations and guidance under easy conditions, and is prepared to provide all researchers and interested parties with information on war sources.

== See also ==
- Society for the Defence of Palestinian Nation
- List of extensive Iranian ground operations in the Iran-Iraq war
- Islamic Development Organization
- Soore University
- Amir Kabir Publishers
- The law countering the hostile actions of the Zionist regime against peace and security
- Death to Israel
- Israel won't exist in 25 years
- Operations attributed to Israel in Iran
- Operation Tyre
- Ahmad Qasir
- Fathi Razem
- Salah Al-Zawawi
- Imamzadeh Ali ibn Jafar
- Operation Ghader
- Operation Ramadan
