= Islamic Development Coordination Council =

Islamic organization of Iran

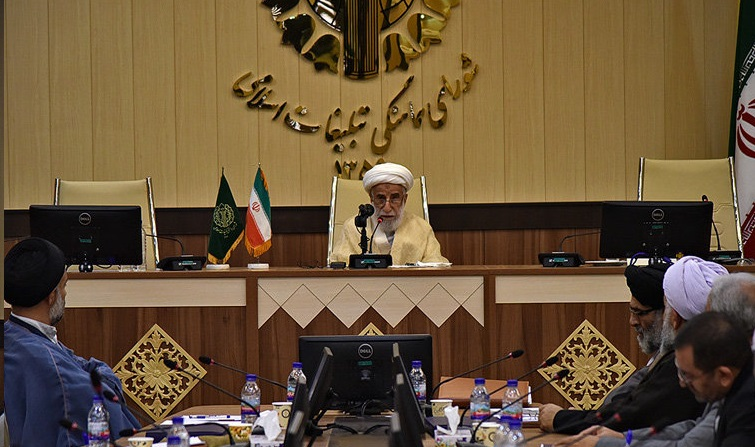
- IDGC conference in Mashhad in 2018
- Founded: August 3, 1980; 46 years ago
- Founder: Ruhollah Khomeini, Gholam-Hossein Haqani, Ahmad Jannati, Mohammad Beheshti, Mohammed Emami-Kashani, Mohammad-Reza Mahdavi Kani, Ali Movahedi-Kermani, Mohammad-Javad Bahonar
- Location: Tehran, Iran
- Region served: Worldwide service
- Key people: Mohammad-Hossein Mousapour
- Website: http://www.ccoip.ir/

Islamic Development Coordination Council (Persian: شورای هماهنگی تبلیغات اسلامی) is one of the revolutionary institutions of the Islamic Republic of Iran, which coordinates and coheres for the development activities between the "development-agencies/centers". The council was formed on 3 August 1980 with the consent of Iran's Supreme Leader, Seyyed Ruhollah Khomeini.

To date, the heads of this institution have been "Gholam-Hossein Haqqani" (who served until 1982) and Ahmad Jannati (currently serving). They both were appointed by Iran's Supreme Leader. The main center of the organization is located in Tehran. It also has numerous other centres throughout Iran.

== Activities ==
The Islamic Development Coordination Council facilitates and aligns development efforts among various development agencies and centers. The council's activities are primarily related to organizing major ceremonies and official events, including:

- Iranian Islamic Republic Day
- Death and state funeral of Ruhollah Khomeini
- 15 Khordad incident
- Hafte Tir
- Hashte Shahrivar
- 17 Shahrivar
- Quds Day
- Eid al-Fitr
- Mid-Sha'ban
- 9 Dey
- Fajr decade
- 13 Aban
- Hafte-ye-Zan (Women's day)

And so forth.

== See also ==
- Coordination Council of Islamic Revolution Forces
- Islamic Development Organization
- Islamic Culture and Communication Organization
- Office of Literature and Art of Resistance
