= Embassy of Israel, Tehran =

Former diplomatic mission in Iran

Embassy of Israel in Tehran
- Location: Kakh Street (now Palestine Street), Tehran, Iran
- Coordinates: 35.7045°N 51.4035°E
- Opening: 6 March 1950 (de facto)
- Closed: 17 February 1979
- Ambassador: Yossef Harmelin

Israel established a de facto embassy in Tehran, Iran, shortly after the Iranian government recognized Israel's sovereignty in 1950. The completion and opening of a large three-story building on Kakh Street (now Palestine Street) formally strengthened Iran–Israel relations, and the Israeli ambassador to Iran was regularly present in Tehran until the Iranian Revolution, when the embassy was attacked and handed over to the Palestine Liberation Organization. In February 1979, Palestinian political leader Yasser Arafat was received by Iranian politicians Ahmad Khomeini and Ebrahim Yazdi to attend an official ceremony in which the building and the address at which it stood were renamed to serve as the Palestinian diplomatic mission in Iran.

Upon toppling the Pahlavi dynasty, the Iranian government of Ruhollah Khomeini severed all extant ties with Israel and rescinded recognition of the country's sovereignty. The Islamic Republic of Iran has since maintained a policy seeking to replace Israel with a Palestinian state, and consequently does not accept Israeli passports for entry while also invalidating Iranian passports for travel to Israel.

== History ==
=== Establishment of Iran–Israel relations (1950) ===
Under Mohammad Reza Pahlavi, Iran voted against the United Nations Partition Plan for Palestine in 1947 and against Israel's admission to the United Nations in 1949. Nevertheless, on 6 March 1950, it became the second Muslim-majority country after Turkey to recognize Israel's sovereignty. Following the 1979 Iranian Revolution, however, the Israel embassy in Iran was closed. After that, Iran never recognized Israel.

Zvi Duriel was the first ambassador of Israel's political representation in Iran. During the 5-year embassy of Israel's plenipotentiary representative in Tehran, with ambassador Uri Lubrani between 1974 and 1979, many Israeli officials visited Iran many times, such as Yitzhak Rabin, Yigal Allon, Moshe Dayan and Shimon Peres. Yossef Harmelin, the former head of Israel's internal security agency (Shin Bet), was the last plenipotentiary representative of Israel in Tehran, whose term as ambassador in Tehran ended with the victory of the 1979 Iranian Revolution. Finally, on 18 February 1979, the Israeli ambassador, Harmelin, and the embassy staff fled the country.

=== Closure during the Islamic Revolution (1979) ===
The Palestine Liberation Organization (PLO) backed the 1979 Iranian Revolution. On 19 February, after relations with Israel were severed, PLO chief Yasser Arafat led a Palestinian delegation to Iran that was publicly welcomed and symbolically handed the keys to the former Israeli embassy in Tehran, which later became the Palestinian embassy. Hani al-Hassan, one of the key diplomatic figures of the PLO, was appointed as the first ambassador of Palestine to Iran.

Before the 1979 Iranian Revolution, Iran and Israel had close but informal relations with each other, which went beyond economic and commercial relations. According to the archives of the Israeli Ministry of Foreign Affairs, during that period, more than 500 Israeli families lived in Iran, and Israeli students which living in Tehran, went to a Hebrew school under the supervision of the Israeli Ministry of Education, which was managed by the Israeli political representation in Tehran.

In 1962, Jalal Al-e-Ahmad, a famous Iranian author, traveled to Israel for two weeks and published a travelogue of his experience. The expenses of this trip were covered by the political representation of Israel in Tehran.

== List of ambassadors ==
From 1950 to 1979, when the Israeli embassy was operating in Iran, the following people were appointed as ambassadors:

- Zvi Duriel (1964–1968)
- Meir Ezri (1968–1973)
- Uri Lubrani (1973–1978)
- Yossef Harmelin (1978–1979)

== See also ==
- List of diplomatic missions in Iran
  - Embassy of Palestine, Tehran
- Iran–Israel proxy conflict
  - Palestine Square Countdown Clock
  - The law countering the hostile actions of the Zionist regime against peace and security
- Political slogans of the Islamic Republic of Iran
  - "Death to Israel"
  - "Little Satan"
  - "Israel won't exist in 25 years"
- Israeli support for Iran during the Iran–Iraq War
