= Embassy of Palestine, Tehran =

Embassy of the State of Palestine in Iran سفارة دولة فلسطين لدى إيران سفارت فلسطین در تهران
- Location: Iran
- Address: No. 347, Palestine Street, Tehran
- Opening: 1979
- Ambassador: Salam Al-Zawawi

The Embassy of the State of Palestine in Iran (Arabic: سفارة دولة فلسطين لدى إيران; Persian: سفارت فلسطین در تهران) is the diplomatic mission of the Palestine to Iran, located in Palestine Street in Tehran. This mission was initially managed by the Palestine Liberation Organization and currently by the State of Palestine.

== History ==
Embassy of the State of Israel in Iran שגרירות ישראל בטהראן
- Location: Imperial State of Iran
- Address: Tehran
- Opening: 6 March 1950 (de facto)
- Closed: 18 February 1979
- Ambassador: Uri Lubrani

From 1950 to 1979, this diplomatic mission was known as the Embassy of the State of Israel in Tehran (Hebrew: שגרירות ישראל בטהראן; Arabic: سفارة دولة اسرائيل لدى إيران) when Iran and Israel had diplomatic relations until the Iranian Revolution.

The Palestine Liberation Organization backed the 1979 revolution, and several days after the revolution, PLO chief Yasser Arafat led a Palestinian delegation to Iran. The Palestinian delegates were publicly welcomed, and symbolically handed the keys to the former Israeli embassy in Tehran, which later became a Palestinian embassy. Hani al-Hassan, one of the key diplomatic figures of the PLO, was appointed as the first ambassador of Palestine to Iran.

== List of ambassadors ==
No.	Name	Name in Arabic	Appointment	Dismissal	Remarks
1	Hani al-Hassan	هاني الحسن	1979	1981	
2	Salah Al-Zawawi	صلاح الزواوي	1981	2022	
3	Salam Al-Zawawi	سلام الزواوي	2022	incumbent	Daughter of Salah

== See also ==
- Embassy of Israel, Tehran
- Iran–Palestine relations
- List of diplomatic missions in Iran
- List of diplomatic missions of Palestine
