= Salah Al-Zawawi =

Ambassador of Palestine to Iran

- صلاح الزواوي
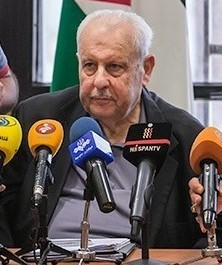

Palestinian Ambassador to Iran
- In office February 1981 – 8 January 2022
- Preceded by: Hani al-Hassan
- Succeeded by: Salam Al-Zawawi

Palestinian Ambassador to Kenya
- In office 1977–1979

Palestinian Ambassador to Brazil
- In office 1975–1977

Palestinian Ambassador to Algeria
- In office 1968–1975

Personal details
- Born: Salah Al-Zawawi; 1937 Safed, Mandatory Palestine
- Died: 20 February 2023 (aged 85–86) Iran, Tehran
- Party: Fatah
- Spouse: Dalaal Al-A'raj
- Children: Salam Al-Zawawi (daughter)

Salah Al-Zawawi (Arabic: صلاح الزواوي; 1937 – February 20, 2023), or among Iranians Salah Zawawi, was a Palestinian politician and diplomat who served as the ambassador of Palestine to Iran. He was the second ambassador of Palestine to Iran after Hani al-Hassan and held this position from February 1981 to January 2022. He is one of the founding members of the Fatah movement and the former Palestinian ambassador to Algeria, Brazil and Kenya.

== Life ==
Salah al-Zawawi was born in 1937 in the city of Safed, then part of Mandate for Palestine. During the 1948 Palestine War, Salah al-Zawawi migrated to Syria with his family, and settled in the city of Aleppo. Salah al-Zawawi came to Tehran in 1980 as the Palestinian ambassador. After that, he lived in Tehran for about 39 years and died in the same city.

Al-Zawawi started fighting against Israel in his youth and was one of the founders of the Fatah movement along with Yasser Arafat and was present in many important operations. Salah al-Zawawi, who was an experienced diplomat, was sent to Tehran in 1983 to succeed Hani al-Hassan. Salah al-Zawawi was the Palestinian ambassador in Tehran for a long period of four decades, from 1980 to 2022. And because of his long service, he was given the title of "Moghaddam Al-Sofara" or "Sheikh Al-Sofara" (lit. 'Doyen'). Salah al-Zawawi continued his diplomatic activity in Tehran until January 2022 and resigned from the embassy in this year. Salah al-Zawawi's daughter Salam al-Zawawi, who was familiar with Iranian culture due to her long-term residence in Iran, appointed as the Palestinian ambassador in Tehran after her father's resignation.

== The end of the mission in Iran ==
On Thursday, 6 January 2022, at the end of his mission in Iran, Salah al-Zawawi met with Iranian Foreign Minister Hossein Amir-Abdollahian. Salam al-Zawawi, the daughter of Salah al-Zawawi, became the new Palestinian ambassador to Iran after her father, took the oath before Mahmoud Abbas, the president of Palestine, on Saturday night, 8 January 2022, and started working as the new Palestinian ambassador to Iran. This ceremony was held at the residence of Mahmoud Abbas in Amman, the capital of Jordan.

== Career ==
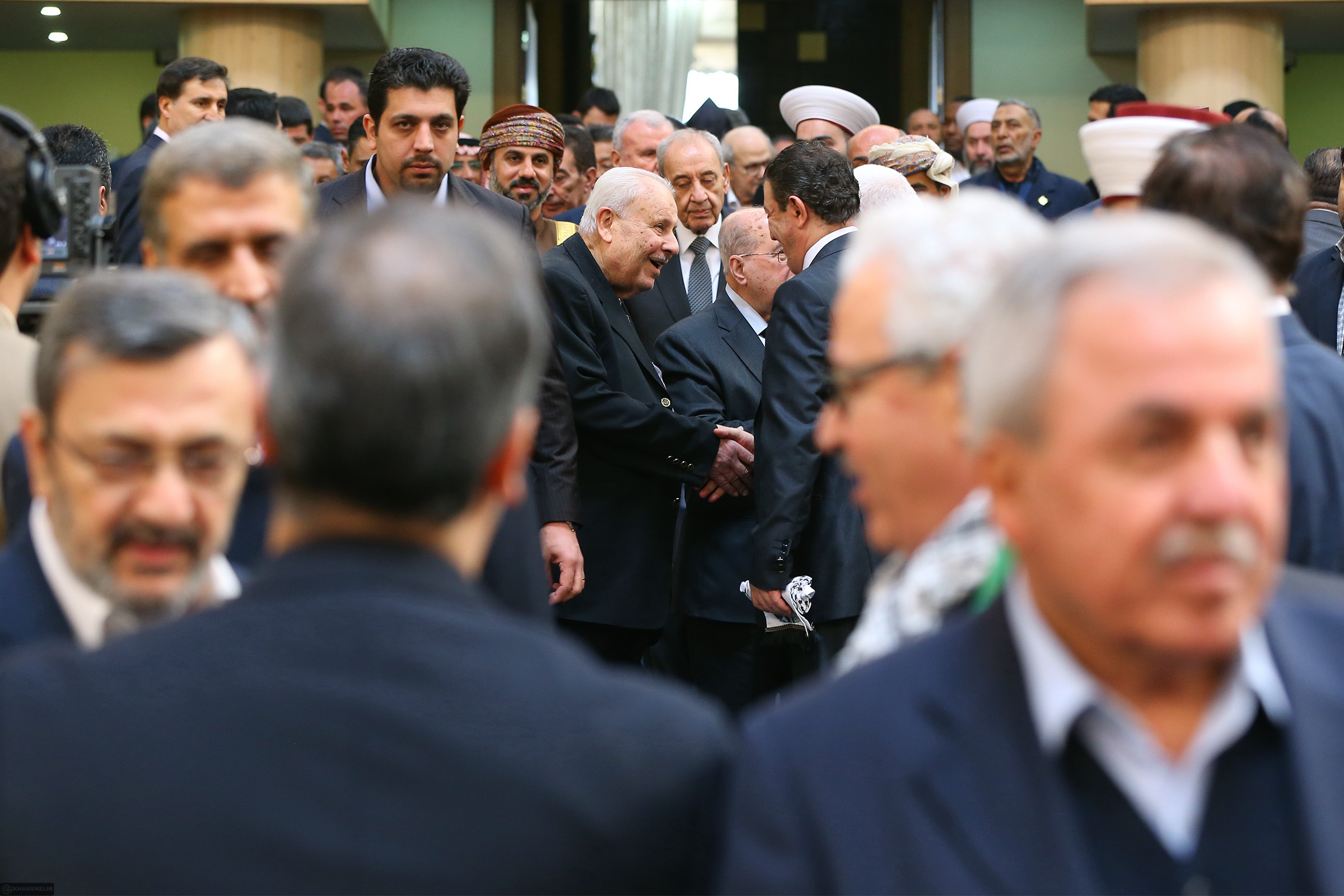
Salah al-Zawawi at the Sixth International Conference on Supporting Palestine Intifada, Tehran, February 21, 2017

Before working as an ambassador in Tehran, Salah al-Zawawi was the Palestinian ambassador to Algeria in 1968, the Palestinian ambassador to Brazil in 1975, and the Palestinian ambassador to Kenya from 1977 to 1979. In 1980, after the victory of the Iranian Islamic revolution, he came to Tehran as the ambassador of Palestine and held this position until 2022. He was the ambassador of Palestine in Iran for more than 40 years, and contrary to diplomatic custom and even though his mission was over, he continued to work as an ambassador in Iran at the request of the Palestinian government, which according to him, "staying in this position is beyond politics."

Salah al-Zawawi was the second Palestinian ambassador to Iran after Hani al-Hassan. Salah al-Zawawi was the "only legal representative of the Palestinian nation" in Iran from 1981 to 2022. Salah al-Zawawi established a close relationship with Iranian politicians and had relations with representatives of all Palestinian resistance groups.

== His title ==
Due to his long-term presence as an ambassador in Iran, Salah al-Zawawi was given the titles such as "Al-Safir al-Avval" (السفير الأول in Arabic, lit. 'The first of the ambassadors'), "Moghaddam al-Sofaraa" (مقدم السفراء in Arabic, lit. 'Presenter of the ambassadors') and "Sheikh al-Sofaraa" (شيخ السفراء in Arabic, lit. 'Sheikh of the ambassadors').

== Honoring him ==
Because of the 39 years or according to another story more than 40 years of Salah al-Zawawi's diplomatic and media activity for Iran and Palestine, a celebration ceremony was held for him at Media Cultural Center in Tehran on Monday 28 February 2022. The ceremony, was prepared by the Society for the Defence of Palestinian Nation and was held with the presence of some Iranian officials and political figures. In the ceremony, Salah al-Zawawi's sincere efforts were appreciated and thanked.

When Salah al-Zawawi died, many Iranian officials, including Hossein Amir-Abdollahian, the Minister of Foreign Affairs of the Islamic Republic of Iran, expressed their condolences.

== Death of his wife ==
After the death of his wife Dalaal Al-A'raj, Salah al-Zawawi buried her at Behesht-e Zahra cemetery in Tehran, Iran.

== Death ==
Salah al-Zawawi was admitted to a hospital in Tehran due to old age and illness. He died on 20 February 2023, at the age of 86. His body was buried in the section of Naam Aavaraan (burying place of famous figures) of the Behesht-e Zahra cemetery in Tehran, Iran.

== See also ==
- Meir Ezri
- Hakam Balawi
- Issam Sartawi
- Khalil al-Wazir
- Khaled al-Hassan
- Said Hammami
- Nabil Shaath
- Salim al-Za'nun
- Rami Hamdallah
- Dalal Mughrabi
- Moussa Arafat
- Saeb Erekat
- Fahad Al-Ahmed Al-Jaber Al-Sabah
- Ahmad Qasir
- Fathi Razem
- The law countering the hostile actions of the Zionist regime against peace and security
- Iranian reactions to the Gaza War (2008–2009)
- Death to Israel
- Israel won't exist in 25 years
- Operations attributed to Israel in Iran
- Ibn Inabah
- Iran-Israel non-political relations

Diplomatic posts
Preceded by –	Palestinian Ambassador to Algeria; 1968–1975	Succeeded by –
Preceded by –	Palestinian Ambassador to Brazil; 1975–1977	Succeeded by –
Preceded by –	Palestinian Ambassador to Kenya; 1977–1979	Succeeded by –
Preceded by Hani al-Hassan	Palestinian Ambassador to Iran; 1981–2022	Succeeded by Salam Al-Zawawi
