= Islamic Culture and Communication Organization =

Ministry of culture

Islamic Culture and relations Organization
- سازمان فرهنگ و ارتباطات اسلامی

Agency overview
- Formed: 1995
- Jurisdiction: Islamic Republic of Iran
- Agency executive: Mohammad Mehdi Imanipour
- Parent agency: Ministry of Culture and Islamic Guidance
- Website: http://icro.ir/

Islamic Culture and relations Organization (Persian: سازمان فرهنگ و ارتباطات اسلامی) is one of the Iranian organizations affiliated with the Ministry of Culture and Islamic Guidance. It was established in 1995, and its main responsibility is in the field of cultural activities (outside of Iran). Mohammad Mehdi Imanipour is the head of the organization.

== Objectives ==
The organization's objectives are as follows:

- Strengthen cultural relations between different nations and ethnic groups, particularly with Islamic-countries; providing situations for unity between Muslims of the world;
- Introduction of the school of Ahl al-Bayt on the subject of belief/jurisprudence/ethics.

== Members ==
The Islamic Culture and Communication Organization has two pillars, consisting of the head of the organization and "the Supreme Council". Supreme-council is composed of 11 members who are appointed by the decree of Iran's supreme leader, Seyyed Ali Khamenei; including:

- Three scientific/cultural personalities which are chosen by the Supreme Leader; the Deputy of International Relations at Office of the Supreme Leader of Iran; and the head of the organization.
- Minister of Culture and Islamic Guidance (Chairman of the council) and minister of Foreign Affairs.
- Chief of the Islamic Republic of Iran Broadcasting.
- Islamic Development Organization's head.
- Secretary general of The World Forum for Proximity of Islamic Schools of Thought

== See also ==
- Islamic Development Organization
- Ministry of Culture and Islamic Guidance
- Islamic Development Coordination Council
- Office of Literature and Art of Resistance
