= Said Hammami =

Palestinian politician, diplomat and journalist

- سعيد حمّامي

London Representative of the Palestine Liberation Organization (PLO)
- In office 1972 – 4 January 1978

Personal details
- Born: 1941 Jaffa, Palestine
- Died: 4 January 1978 (aged 36–37) London, United Kingdom
- Party: Palestine Liberation Organization (PLO)

Said Hammami (Arabic: سعيد حمّامي; 1941 – 4 January 1978) was a Palestinian politician, diplomat and journalist, and the London representative of the Palestine Liberation Organization (PLO) from 1972 until his assassination in 1978.

== Biography ==
Born in Jaffa in 1941, Said Hammami fled the British Mandate of Palestine with his family upon the breakout of hostilities which preceded the creation of the State of Israel in 1948.

After a brief stop at a refugee camp in Egypt, his family moved to Lebanon and then settled in Jordan, where his father re-established himself as a fruit and vegetable trader. After attending high school in Jordan, Said Hamami moved to Syria for university education. It was in Damascus that his interest in politics took shape, as he joined the Arab Ba'ath Party while still at college studying English Literature. After his graduation from university, he worked as a journalist in Damascus and then traveled to Saudi Arabia where he found a job as a school teacher. His stay there was not to last long, as his devotion to the Palestinian cause took him back to Syria, where he soon quit the Ba'ath Party to join the Palestine Liberation Organization, soon after its establishment in May 1964. He quickly climbed the ranks of the organization and become a member of the Palestinian National Council at the young age of 30.

Hammami was appointed by Yasser Arafat to be the first diplomatic delegate of the PLO to the UK in 1973, heading their Office in London. There, he began to promote co-existence between the Palestinians and Israelis, calling for a two-state solution to the Question of Palestine. In 1974 and 1975, Said Hammami, in interviews to journalists and newspaper opinion pieces, articulated what has sometimes been considered the first indication of PLO acceptance of a two-state solution. A 1974 interview with Joseph Finklestone in The Jewish Chronicle was controversial among Israelis, because much of the Israeli populace of that period (including Golda Meir), held that "Palestinians" were not "a distinct entity" with a legitimate identity.

In London, he also established contacts with British politicians and journalists, as well as building relations with Israeli peace activists, most notably Uri Avnery, who wrote a book about him after his assassination, which he entitled My Friend the Enemy.

== Assassination ==
Hammami was assassinated in his office in London on 4 January 1978, where he was serving as the representative of the PLO to the United Kingdom. The perpetrator was allegedly Abu Nidal's breakaway faction of the PLO. Hamami's funeral service was held in Beirut with the attendances of the PLO leaders on 8 January.

== See also ==
- Salah Zawawi
