= Disavowal of polytheists in Hajj =

Annual Islamic tradition

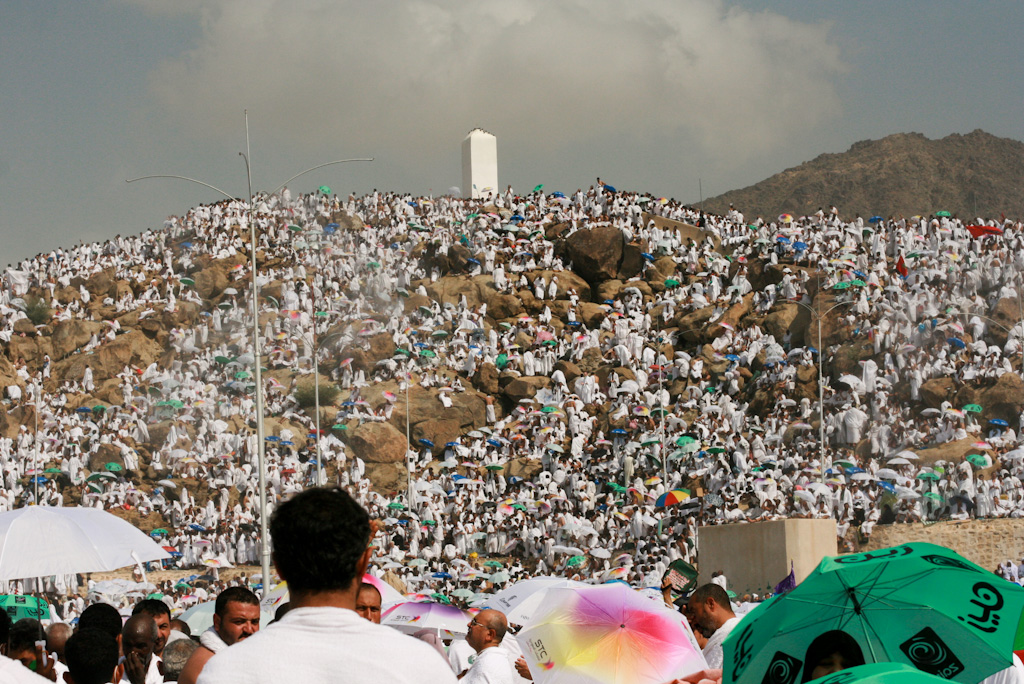
Arafat, the holding place of the disavowal in recent years

Disavowal of polytheists in Hajj (Arabic: البراءة من المشركين في الحج; Persian: برائت از مشرکین در حج) is an Iranian Muslim religious/political tradition which is performed yearly at the time of Hajj. Part of the ceremony involves chanting "Death to America" and "Death to Israel". Disavowal of polytheists is a Qur'anic term or tradition which is applied to "disgust to polytheists and the enemies of Allah and his Apostle"; it likewise means: "Announcement of Bara'ah (disgust/aversion) from all taghuts and arrogance powers".

Aversion to idolaters or disavowal of polytheists in Hajj has been recently followed with more diligence from the political angle, and is carried out by Hajjis as an opportunity to confront the plans of arrogance. According to Shia scholars, this Quranic tradition can be traced from the time of Khalilullah (Abraham) to the Islamic prophet Muhammad. In recent years, it has also been used by religious/political leaders, such as Ruhollah Khomeini and Ali Khamenei.

== In the Quran ==
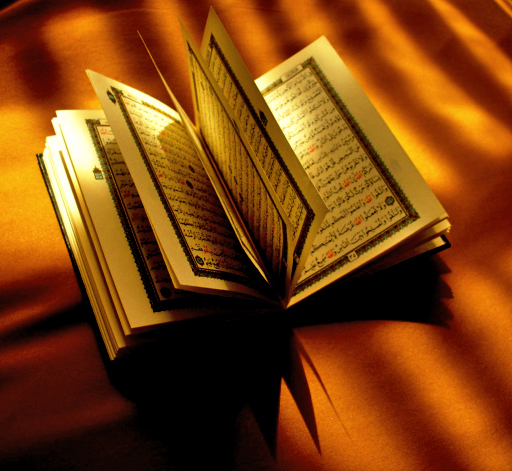
Quran, the central religious text/book of Islam

The Quran mentions Bara'ah in relation to "Bara'ah Min al-Mushrikin" (disavowal of polytheists) at the time of Muhammad (during the season of Hajj in the 9th lunar year), and the aversion of Abraham from Mushrikins (polytheists). The removing of idols from the Kaaba by Muhammad during the history of Islam portrays the importance of this tradition from Islamic aspect.

The issue of "disavowal of polytheists" has been mentioned in several Surahs of the Quran, such as in Surah Al-Mumtahanah, Surah Al-Fath, Surah Al-Ma'ida, and Surah Bara'ah (At-Tawba). According to the announcement of Bara'ah, it was banned for the polytheists to enter Masjid al-Haram and to perform Hajj.

== Modern usage ==
The revival of this Islamic custom and its explanation come from the suggestion of the first supreme leader of Iran, Ruhollah Khomeini, who named the two doctrines of "Tawalla and Tabarra" as the main base of this Islamic expression.

In explaining the philosophy of Bara'at (Disavowal), Khomeini mentions that "the great/mean/little (first, middle and back) devils must be repulsed from the holy privacy of Islam." He also said, in regards to the issue of "Bara'ah Min al-Mushrikin" (disavowal of polytheists) in Hajj,"

... the declaration of disavowal in Hajj is a renewal of the covenant to wage the struggle and an exercise for organizing the ranks of the strugglers for continuing the battle against disbelief, polytheism and idolatry. It is not a matter of mere slogans; it is the proclamation of a program for the struggle and a starting point for organizing the forces of God in their battle against the forces of the Devil and the devilish people. It is the most preliminary lesson of the school of monotheism. If Muslims cannot declare disavowal with the enemies of God in the House of God and of people where else, then, shall they do it? ...

After Khomeini's death, his successor Seyyed Ali Khamenei issues messages annually on the ritual of "disavowal of polytheists" to Hajj pilgrims. He mentioned in one message that "[t]he ritual of Bara’ah[,] which means refusing every instance of mercilessness, cruelty, wrongdoing and corruption of the tyrants of any time, and rising against intimidation and extortion by the arrogant throughout history, is one of the great blessings of Hajj, and an opportunity for oppressed Muslim nations. Today, repudiating the front of shirk [polytheism] and kufr [disbelief] made up of the arrogant powers—the foremost of them being the U.S.—equals refusing the killing of the oppressed, and waging wars..."

== See also ==
- 1987 Mecca incident
- Al Wala' Wal Bara'
- At-Tawba
- Glossary of Islam
- Hajj and Pilgrimage Organization (Iran)
- Tawalla
- Tabarra
