= Israel won't exist in 25 years =

Iran's leader Khamenei's opinion about Israel

Avatar of Khamenei.ir

Khamenei.ir
(@khamenei_ir)
tweeted:

After negotiations, in Zionist regime they said they had no more concern about Iran for next 25 years; I’d say:
Firstly,
You will not see next 25 years; God willing, there will be nothing as Zionist regime by next 25 years.
Secondly,
Until then, struggling, heroic and jihadi morale will leave no moment of serenity for Zionists.

9 September 2015

"Israel won't exist in 25 years" is a statement by Ali Khamenei, then Supreme Leader of Iran, in a 2015 speech about Israel after the Iran nuclear deal framework, which was published on his Twitter. According to Khamenei's official website, this sentence was chosen as "the most important and memorable sentence of Khamenei" in 2015. This slogan is used in propaganda and also in the Quds Day.

Khamenei has explained that the destruction of Israel is aimed at enmity with the Israeli government. At the same time, this slogan was installed on the calendar board in Tehran city at the Palestine Square Countdown Clock. And the Tasnim News Agency, affiliated to the IRGC, has attributed this slogan to Islamic awakening.

During the 2023 Israeli judicial reform protests, Ali Khamenei and Ebrahim Raisi claimed that the fall of Israel will happen sooner than 25 years (until 2040).

== Background ==
After the agreement in 2015 between Iran and the 5+1 group, Israel announced that there will be no worries about war between Iran and Israel and the security of the country of Israel is guaranteed for the next 25 years. In response to Israel's statement, Khamenei said in a statement: "I tell you first that Israel will not see the next 25 years; Second, during this period, Iran will maintain the spirit of championship, seriousness, and jihad, and you will be worried every moment." On December 14, 2016, Khamenei repeated this sentence in his meeting with Ramadan Abdullah and said: "As we have said before, the Zionist regime will not have a foreign existence in the next 25 years under the condition of the general and united struggle of the Palestinians and Muslims against the Zionists."

== Israel's reaction ==
Israeli Prime Minister Benjamin Netanyahu said: "Khamenei's words leave its supporters with no room for illusion." He also stated: "He has made it clear that the U.S. is the Great Satan and that Iran intends to destroy the state of Israel. This will not happen. Israel is a strong country and it will become even stronger."

== See also ==
- Destruction of Israel in Iranian policy
- Iran–Israel relations
- The law countering the hostile actions of the Zionist regime against peace and security
- Death to Israel
- Israel and the nuclear program of Iran
- Embassy of Israel, Tehran
- Meir Ezri
- Salah Al-Zawawi
- Society for the Defence of Palestinian Nation
- Iran–Israel non-political relations
