= Quds in Persian literature =

Quds or Beitol moghadas (Persian: قدس - بیت المقدس) refer to the city of Jerusalem. This name is used in some Persian poems, ancient literature of Persia, geographical books, travel literature, and Persian atlases and maps.

== Examples ==
The following books are some examples of literature that use the name "Quds" to refer Jerusalem:

- Safarnama
- Habib al-Siyar
- Hudud al-'Alam
- Shahnameh

Jerusalem is normally referred to as "Beyt al-Moqaddas" in Persian language and literature, the above-mentioned references included. "Quds" on the other hand is a politicized term used by the Islamic Republic since 1979.

== See also ==
- Quds Day
