= Intisar Abu Amara =

Palestinian politician

President of the Palestinian Presidency Office
- Incumbent
- Assumed office 2018
- Preceded by: Mahmoud Abbas

Acting President of the Palestinian Presidency Office
- In office 2015–2018

Personal details
- Born: May 20, 1958 (age 68) Lebanon
- Profession: Politician

Intisar Walid Ali Abu Amara (born May 20, 1958) is a Palestinian politician who held the position of acting president of the Palestinian Presidency Office in 2015, and in 2018 she was appointed as its president.

== Career ==
On July 7, 2005, Abu Emara was appointed Director General in the President's office. On January 1, 2008, she was promoted to the rank of Assistant Undersecretary, and on January 1, 2010 she became Under Secretary. In 2015, she became Acting President of Presidential Debt, and on March 4, 2018, and also in 2019, she was formally appointed Chief of the Presidential Cabinet, with the rank of Minister. Its term was renewed in 2018 and also in 2019.

== See also ==
- Fathi Razem
