= Fathi Razem =

Palestinian politician (1949–2017)

- فتحی الرازم البحریة
- Born: 1949; Jerusalem
- Died: 9 April 2017 (aged 67–68); United Arab Emirates
- Burial place: Jordan
- Other names: Fathi Al-Bahriya
- Known for: Member of the Revolutionary Council of Palestine; Member of the Palestine Liberation Organization; Member of the Fatah National Liberation Movement

Fathi Razem (Abu Jihad) (Arabic: فتحی الرازم «البحریة») known as Fathi Al-Bahriya (1949 – 4 September 2017) was a Palestinian who was a member of the Palestine Liberation Organization and a member of the Revolutionary Council of Palestine. Razem was one of the first to become a member of Palestine Liberation Organization and contributed to its development. He was also a member of Fatah National Liberation Movement.

== Early life ==
Fathi Razem was born in 1949 in Jerusalem.

== Career ==
Along with Yasser Arafat, he was one of the first members of the Fatah National Liberation Movement. Razem was known as a "Black Box" for Yasser Arafat. Razem was a member of the former Revolutionary Council of Palestine.

== Prosecution ==
During the Second Intifada, Israel prosecuted Fathi Razem and accused him of trying to smuggle weapons via ship known as Karine A. Razem traveled between Arab countries and their capitals to escape the Israelis.

== Death ==
Fathi Razem died due to a serious illness in the United Arab Emirates on September 4, 2017. He was buried in Jordan.

== See also ==
- Intisar Abu Amara
- Ziad Abu Ein
- Hasan Abu-Libdeh
- Mohammad Ali Naseri
- Ahmad Qasir
- Meir Ezri
- Salah Al-Zawawi
- Society for the Defence of Palestinian Nation
