= Ziad Abu Ein =

Palestinian politician (1959–2014)

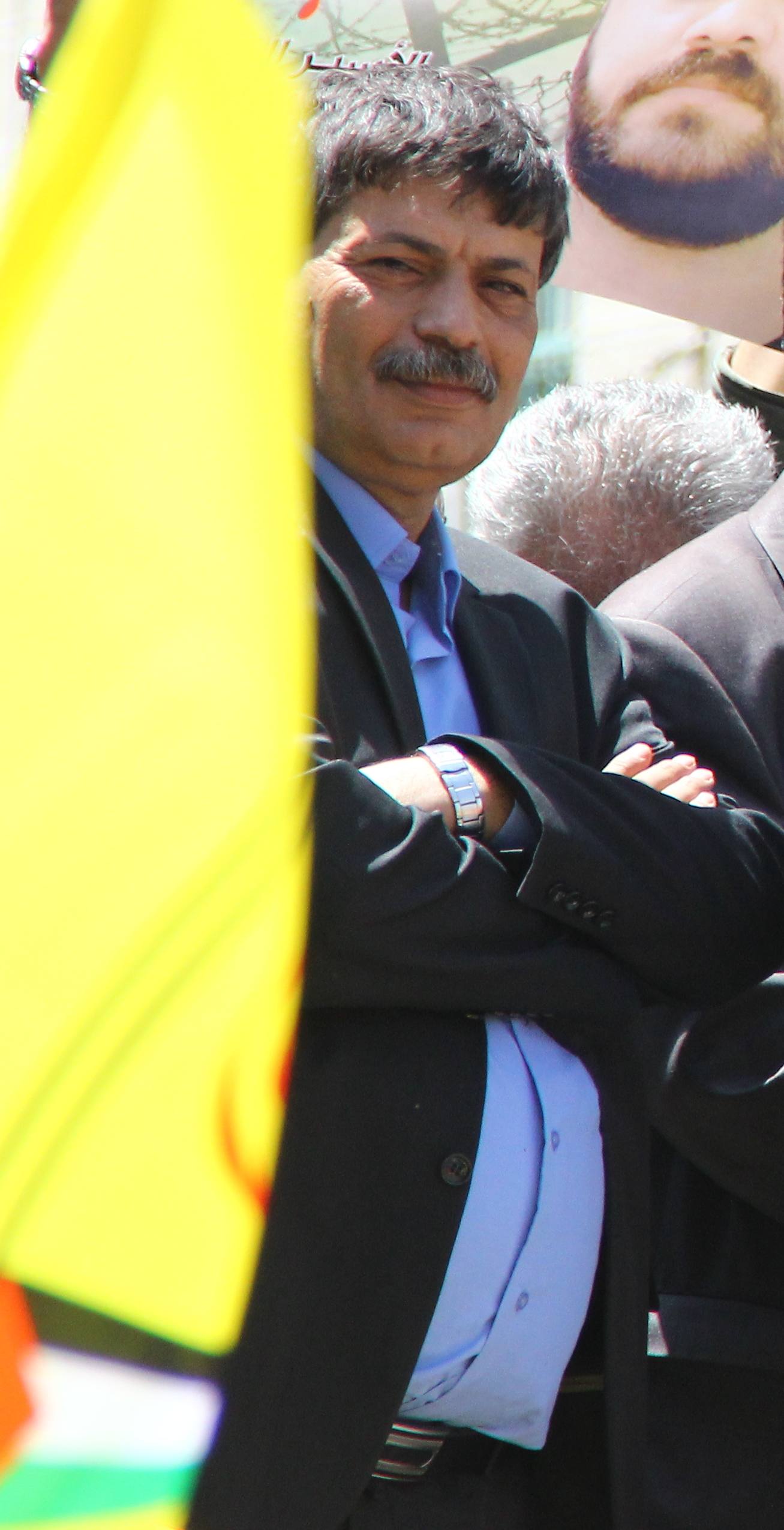
- Ziad Abu Ein during a solidarity stand in Ramallah with Palestinian prisoners in Israeli jails

Minister of Wall and Settlement Affairs without portfolio
- In office June 2014 – 10 December 2014

Deputy Minister for Prisoners' Affairs
- In office 2003–2012

Head of the PLO's Commission Against the Separation Wall and Settlements
- In office September 2014 – 10 December 2014

Personal details
- Born: 22 November 1959
- Died: 10 December 2014 (aged 55) Turmus Ayya, Palestine
- Party: Fatah
- Other political affiliations: Palestine Liberation Organization
- Children: 4
- Occupation: Politician

Ziad Abu Ein, also spelled Ziad Abu Ain, (Arabic: زياد أبو عين; 22 November 1959 – 10 December 2014) was a Palestinian politician. He was a member of the Fatah political party, the Palestine Liberation Organization, and a senior minister in the Palestinian Authority.

He spent years in prison in Israel after being convicted of multiple murders and being sentenced to life imprisonment, but was released in a prisoner exchange deal. He died following an altercation with Israeli soldiers during a Palestinian protest in Turmus Ayya. The circumstances leading to his death are disputed.

== Political life ==
Abu Ein was a member of Fatah and a senior Palestinian official. Before the outbreak of the first intifada, Abu Ein appeared regularly on Israeli television talk shows to discuss politics and was involved in direct talks with Israeli officials on a project that would result in a strategic solution with Israel in the absence of a Palestinian state.

From 2003 to 2012, he served as deputy Minister for Prisoners' Affairs in the Palestinian Authority. In September 2014, he became head of the PLO's Commission Against the Separation Wall and Settlements, responsible for monitoring Israeli activities concerning the separation barrier and construction in settlements in the West Bank and peaceful "popular resistance" activities of Palestinians against the security barrier and settlements as well.

As of September 2014, he was also Minister of Wall and Settlement Affairs without portfolio in the Palestinian Unity Government of June 2014, involved in coordinating and planning non-violent activities on confiscated land or land designated to be expropriated by the Israeli government.

== Arrests and detentions ==
Abu Ein spent more than a decade behind bars over a series of arrests. He first became a prisoner in 1977 in Israel at 18. He was accused of planting a bomb in Tiberias in 1979 which killed two Israeli teenagers and wounded 36 others.

He fled to the U.S. where he was arrested at the request of Israel on suspicions that he had planted the bomb. He spent three years in a Chicago prison fighting extradition, but in 1981 became the first Palestinian to be extradited by the US to Israel. In Israel he faced trial and was convicted of multiple murders a year later by an Israeli court and sentenced to life in prison.

He was sentenced to life in prison. As part of a prisoner exchange deal in 1983 he was released, but immediately re-arrested at Ben Gurion Airport in Tel Aviv, where he was to be deported to Algeria via Egypt. The International Committee of the Red Cross strongly condemned the action, and the Human Rights Council in Geneva passed a resolution that called for Abu Ein's immediate release, with only the US and Israel opposing.

In 1985, he was released as a result of another prisoner deal exchange, the Jibril Agreement, to be arrested for the third time under administrative detention a few months later. After several months, he was rearrested, based on suspicions that he was plotting to hijack a bus. During the second intifada, in 2002, Abu Ein was arrested and subjected to administrative detention.

== Death ==
On 10 December 2014, Abu Ein took part in a protest march to plant olive trees outside the Palestinian village of Turmus Ayya, near Ramallah. During the march, the group had a confrontation with Israeli soldiers, who had been dispatched to the event. The soldiers fired tear gas and stun grenades at the demonstrators. During the confrontation, Abu Ein exhibited signs of physical distress, first sitting down and holding his chest and later losing consciousness.

An Israeli military medic began administering first aid to an unconscious Abu Ein, but, shortly thereafter, the group of Palestinians present decided to evacuate him to a nearby health clinic in Turmus Ayya. He was then transferred by ambulance to a hospital in Ramallah, where he was declared dead upon arrival.

Following the incident, differing reports arose from witnesses who had been present and from video of the encounter. There were claims that Abu Ein had been assaulted by Israeli soldiers during the confrontation, including being choked, headbutted by a soldier wearing a helmet, and struck in the chest with a rifle butt.

There is video of Abu Ein engaged in a heated altercation with Israeli soldiers, at one point being grabbed around the neck by one. Video from shortly afterward shows Abu Ein sitting down and holding his chest, before falling unconscious and being treated by an Israeli medic. He is then shown being rapidly carried away by Palestinians on the scene. Roy Sharon, an Israeli journalist who was present, stated that Abu Ein was never struck in the chest with a rifle butt.

=== Autopsy ===
A joint autopsy was conducted with Jordanian, Palestinian, and Israeli doctors. While both sides agreed that Abu Ein died from a blockage of the coronary artery due to hemorrhaging, they disagreed on the underlying cause of death. The Palestinian and Jordanian doctors said wounds to Abu Ein's front teeth and bruises on the tongue, neck and windpipe were indicative of violent acts that led to his death. The Israeli pathologist, Chen Kugel, said that these injuries could have been caused by violence, but that he thought those injuries were "more compatible with the results of resuscitation efforts.

== Personal life ==
He had 4 children.

== See also ==
- Fathi Razem
