= Palestine Square Countdown Clock =

Digital clock in Tehran, Iran

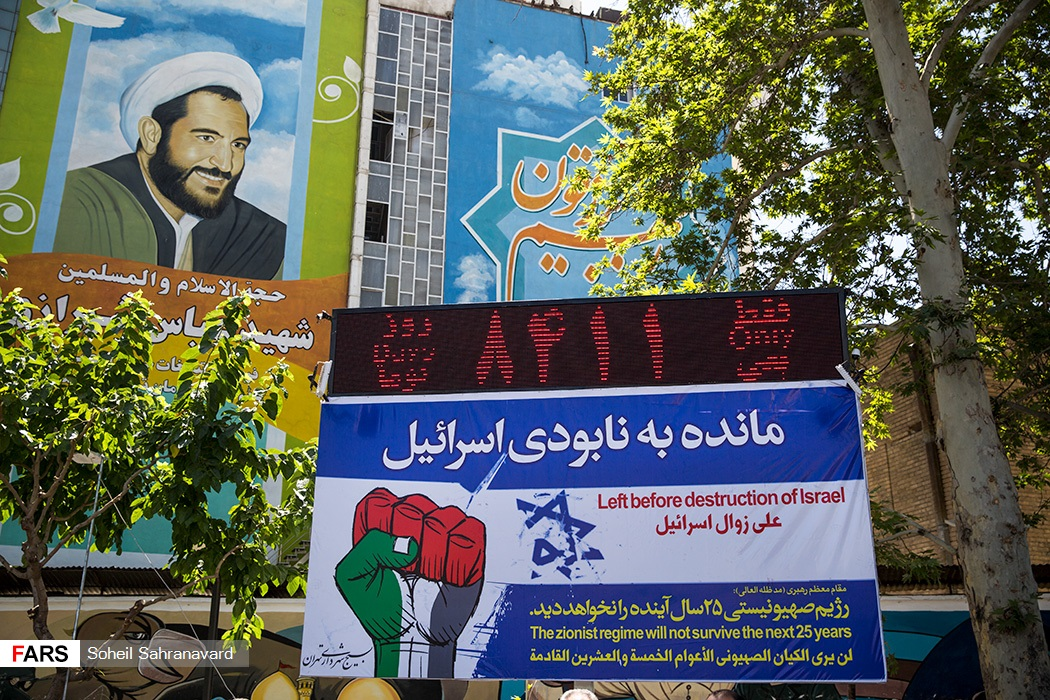
Palestine Square Countdown Clock on 23 June 2017, displaying number ٨۴١١ (8411)

Palestine Square Countdown Clock (Persian: ساعت شمار میدان فلسطین) is a digital clock located in Tehran's Palestine Square, Iran. The clock counts down the putative days to the predicted destruction of the state of Israel. It was unveiled on Quds Day in June 2017.

== History and installation ==
In June 2017, coinciding with the annual Quds Day rallies, Iran unveiled a large digital clock in Palestine Square. The clock was programmed to count down from 8,411 days, corresponding to a 2015 statement by Supreme Leader Ayatollah Ali Khamenei, who predicted that "Israel won't exist in 25 years". He claimed in his statement that there will be nothing left of the Jewish state by 2040. The statement was made in the aftermath of a September 2015 nuclear deal that had a timeline of 25 years to complete. He predicted that it would not take that long for Israel to cease existing. Protesters annually chant "Death to Israel". The installation was part of a much broader demonstration involving over a million participants, where anti-Israel slogans and imagery were prominently featured.

Considering it a symbolic target, the Israeli Air Force tried to destroy the clock in the opening days of the Twelve-Day War but failed. It was bombed on 23 June 2025, whereupon the semi-official Mehr News Agency published a short video on social media which purportedly showed it still ticking down the days to September 2040, with Israel having 5,569 days left (projected date of 21 September 2040, which however does not match original projected date based on the clock announcement, in other words, the video might have been old). The video could not be independently verified. Israel tried again to destroy it but a ceasefire was called, halting the attempt.

During the 2025–2026 Iranian protests, following President Trump's remarks warning Iran about potential consequences, a mural appeared in the square with United States and Israeli graves presented, reading, "Watch out for your soldiers."

== Design and features ==
The clock is a large electronic billboard which displays the message: "Only [X] days remaining to the annihilation of Israel" in Farsi, English, and Arabic visible from anywhere in the square. Despite having had several malfunctions halting the countdown, it remains a significant symbol.

== Symbolism and political context ==
The Palestine Square Countdown Clock symbolizes the Islamic Republic of Iran's belief that in opposing Zionism it can bring about the end of the Israeli state, state policy held by country's political and religious leaders since the 1979 Islamic Revolution. The clock has been criticized in Iran and worldwide and is seen by many as a symbol of existential hostility towards Israel.

== Public reception and criticism ==
The installation has elicited mixed reactions both domestically and internationally. While it is celebrated by hardline factions within Iran as a bold statement of defiance, it has also drawn criticism for inciting hatred and perpetuating regional tensions. Observers note that such displays contribute to the ongoing cycle of hostility in the Middle East.

== See also ==
- Quds Day
- Iran–Israel relations
