= List of diplomatic missions in Iran =

This is a list of diplomatic missions in Iran. There are 89 embassies in Tehran, and many countries maintain consulates in other Iranian cities (not including honorary consulates).

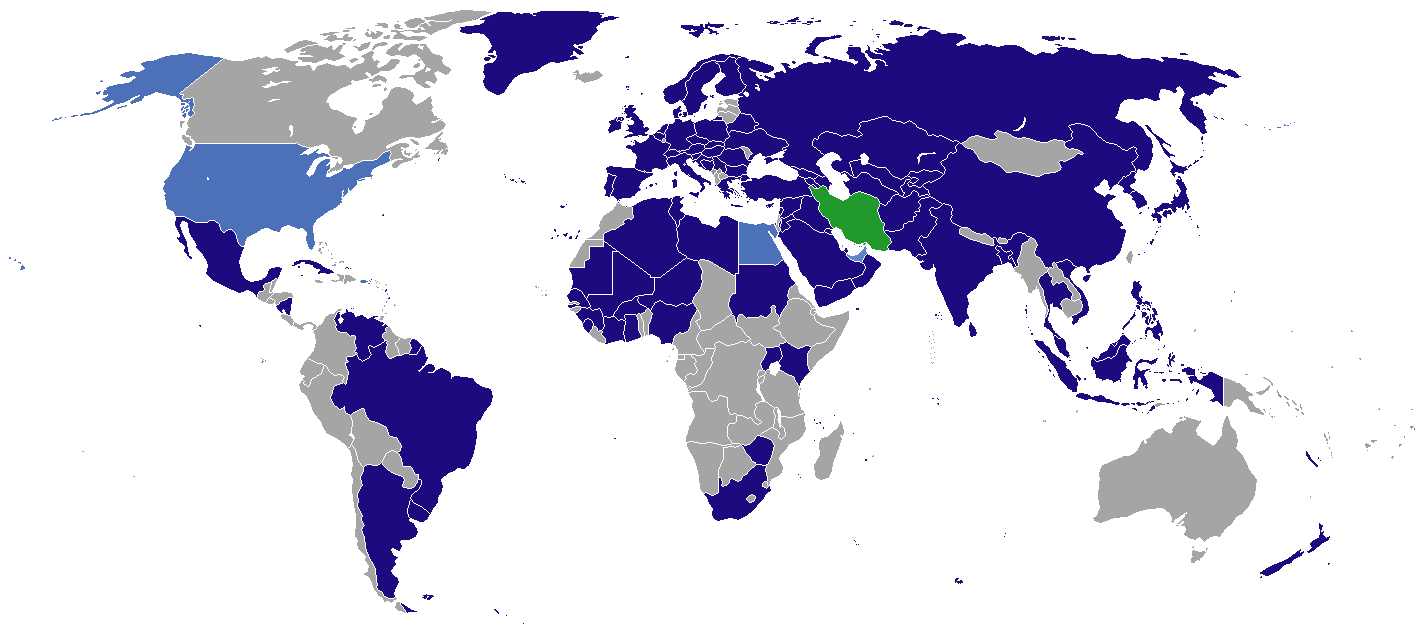
Map of embassies in Tehran

== Diplomatic missions in Tehran ==
=== Embassies ===
1. Afghanistan
2. Algeria
3. Argentina
4. Armenia
5. Austria
6. Azerbaijan
7. Bangladesh
8. Belarus
9. Belgium
10. Bosnia and Herzegovina
11. Brazil
12. Brunei
13. Bulgaria
14. Burkina Faso
15. China
16. Croatia
17. Cuba
18. Cyprus
19. Czechia
20. Denmark
21. Finland
22. France
23. Georgia
24. Germany
25. Ghana
26. Greece
27. Guinea
28. Holy See
29. Hungary
30. India
31. Indonesia
32. Iraq
33. Ireland
34. Italy
35. Ivory Coast
36. Japan
37. Jordan
38. Kazakhstan
39. Kenya
40. Kuwait
41. Kyrgyzstan
42. Lebanon
43. Libya
44. Malaysia
45. Mali
46. Mauritania
47. Mexico
48. Netherlands
49. Nicaragua
50. Niger
51. Nigeria
52. North Korea
53. Norway
54. Oman
55. Pakistan
56. Palestine
57. Philippines
58. Poland
59. Portugal
60. Qatar
61. Romania
62. Russia
63. Saudi Arabia
64. Senegal
65. Serbia
66. Sierra Leone
67. Slovenia
68. South Africa
69. South Korea
70. Spain
71. Sri Lanka
72. Sudan
73. Sweden
74. Switzerland
75. Syria
76. Tajikistan
77. Thailand
78. Tunisia
79. Turkey
80. Turkmenistan
81. Uganda
82. Ukraine
83. United Kingdom
84. Uruguay
85. Uzbekistan
86. Venezuela
87. Vietnam
88. Yemen
89. Zimbabwe

=== Other missions/delegations/offices ===
- Albania (Interests section - Turkey is the protecting power)
- Egypt (interests section - It is supervised by Ministry of Foreign Affairs of Egypt)
- United States (interests section - Switzerland is the protecting power)

=== Gallery ===
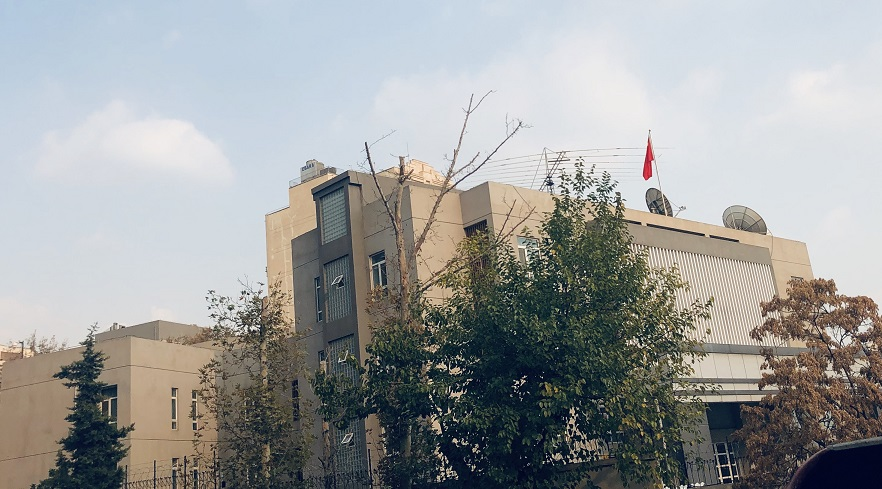
Embassy of China

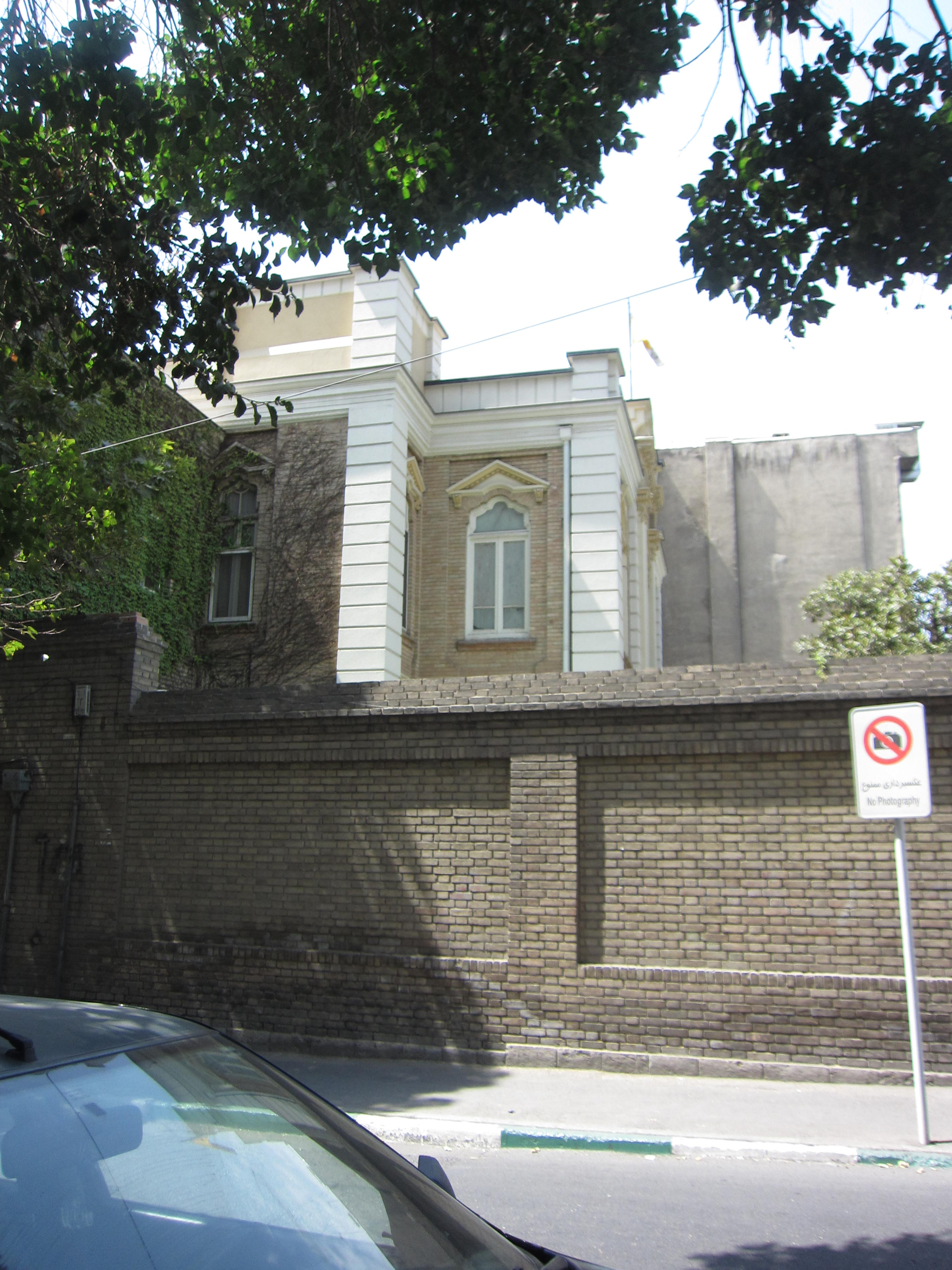
Apostolic Nunciature of the Holy See

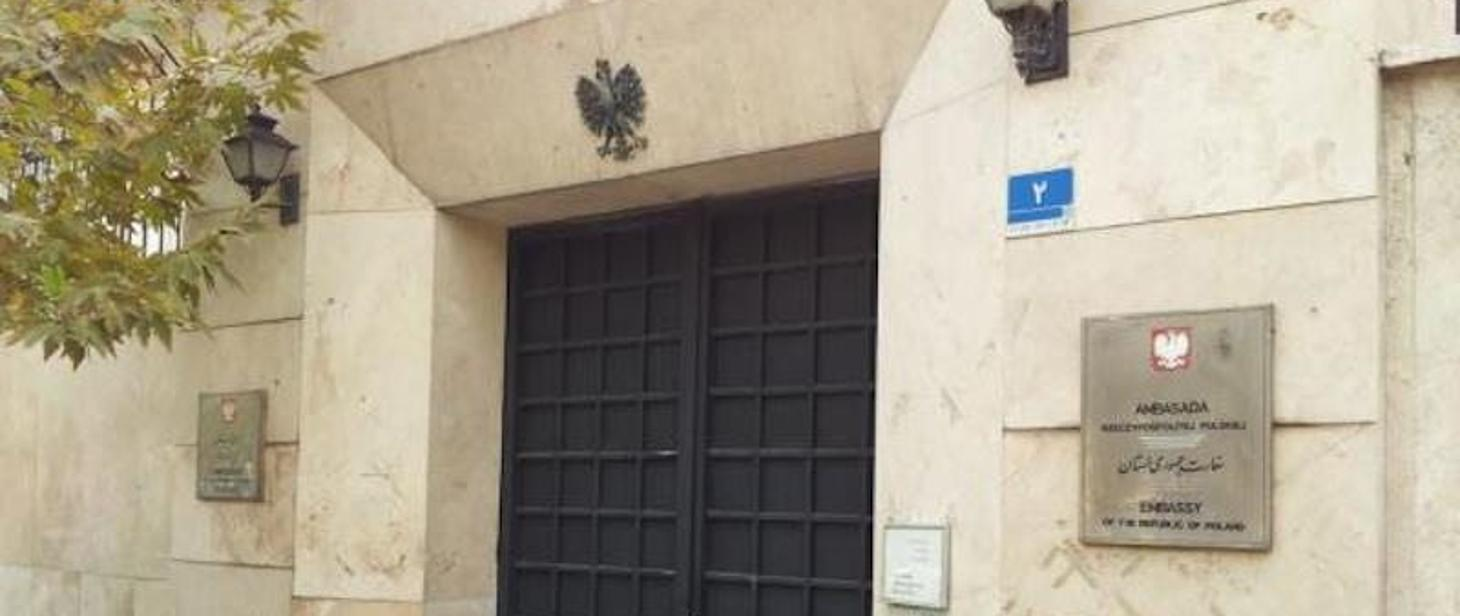
Embassy of Poland

Embassy of Russia

Embassy of Saudi Arabia

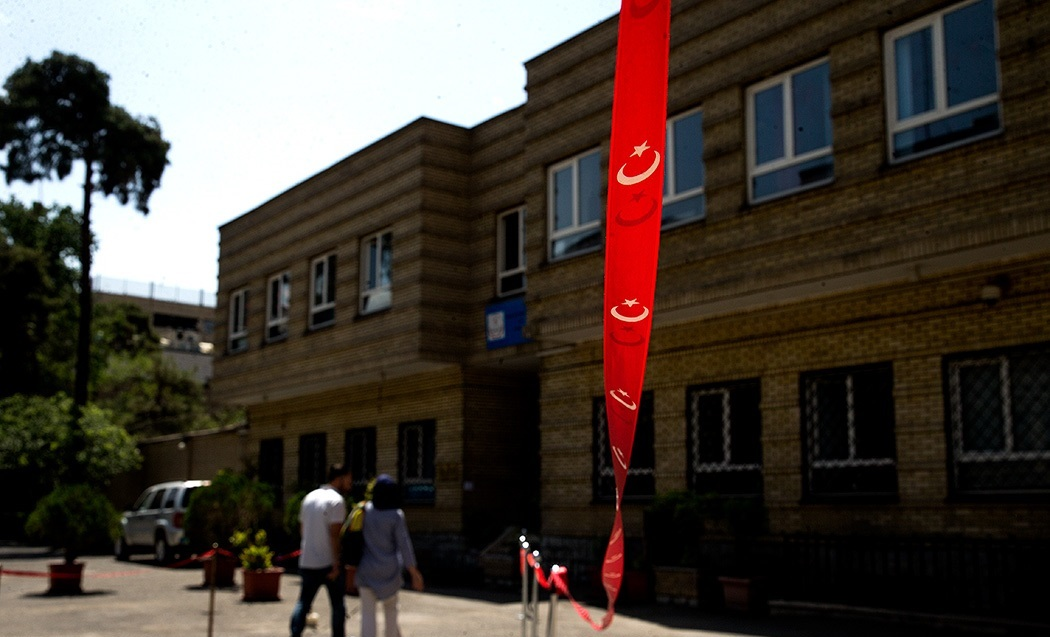
Embassy of Turkey

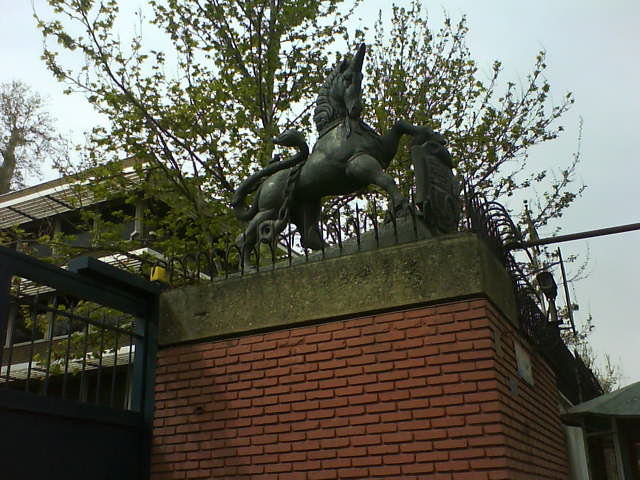
Embassy of the United Kingdom

== Consular missions ==
=== Ahvaz ===
1. Iraq

=== Bandar Abbas ===
- China
- India
- Kazakhstan (Consulate)
- United Arab Emirates

=== Gorgan ===
1. Kazakhstan

=== Isfahan ===
1. Iraq
2. Russia

=== Kermanshah ===
1. Iraq

=== Mashhad ===
- Afghanistan
- Iraq
- Pakistan (Consulate)
- Saudi Arabia
- Tajikistan
- Turkey
- Turkmenistan

=== Rasht ===
1. Russia

=== Tabriz ===
- Azerbaijan
- Turkey

=== Urmia ===
- Turkey

=== Zahedan ===
- Afghanistan
- India
- Pakistan (Consulate-General)

== Non-resident embassies accredited to Iran ==
=== Resident in Abu Dhabi, UAE ===
- Maldives
- Panama
- Seychelles
- Tanzania

=== Resident in Ankara, Turkey ===
- Angola
- Estonia
- Lithuania
- Moldova
- North Macedonia
- Paraguay
- South Sudan

=== Resident in Kuwait City ===
- Central African Republic
- Honduras
- Togo

=== Resident in London, United Kingdom ===
- Dominica
- Tonga
- Vanuatu

=== Resident in New Delhi, India ===
- Bhutan
- Botswana
- Cambodia
- Laos
- Mongolia

=== Resident in Riyadh, Saudi Arabia ===
- Burundi
- Cameroon
- Equatorial Guinea
- Chad

=== Resident in other cities ===
- Costa Rica (Moscow)
- Cape Verde (Moscow)
- Guatemala (New York City)
- Haiti (Doha)
- Iceland (Oslo)
- Malta (Valletta)
- Malawi (Cairo)
- Myanmar (Islamabad)
- Nauru (New York City)
- Nepal (Islamabad)
- Singapore (Singapore)
- São Tomé and Príncipe (Addis Ababa)
- Taiwan (Dubai)
- Timor-Leste (Jakarta)

== Former Diplomatic Missions ==
Host city	Sending country	Mission	Year closed	Ref.
Tehran	Australia	Embassy	2025	Closed in August 2025
Tehran	Bahrain	Embassy (Note: To be reopened.)	2016	Closed after 2016 attack on the Saudi diplomatic missions in Iran
Tehran	Benin	Embassy	2020	
Tehran	Bolivia	Embassy	2026	
Tehran	Burundi	Embassy	2018	
Tehran	Canada	Embassy	2012	Closed due to security concerns
Tehran	Chile	Embassy	2026	
Tehran	Colombia	Embassy (Note: Resident in Ankara, Turkey)	2002	
Tehran	Comoros	Embassy	2016	
Tehran	Ecuador	Embassy	1978	
Tehran	Egypt	Embassy	1979	Closed after Iranian Revolution
Tehran	Ethiopia	Embassy	1997	
Tehran	Gabon	Embassy	1980s	
Tehran	Gambia	Embassy	2010	
Tehran	Guinea-Bissau	Embassy	2020	
Tehran	Israel	Embassy	1979	Closed after 1979 attack to Israeli Embassy in Tehran
Tehran	Morocco	Embassy	2018	
Tehran	New Zealand	Embassy	2025	Closed after War between Iran and Israel
Tehran	Peru	Embassy	1978	
Tehran	Slovakia	Embassy	2025	Closed after War between Iran and Israel
Tehran	Somalia	Embassy	2016	Closed after 2016 attack on the Saudi diplomatic missions in Iran
Tehran	United Arab Emirates	Embassy	2026	Closed after 2026 Iran war
Tehran	United States	Embassy (Note: Under the protecting power of Switzerland.)	1979	Closed after 1979 attack on the American Embassy in Tehran
	Zambia	Embassy	1992	
Khorramshahr	Japan	Consulate-General	1981	Closed temporarily in 1981 during the Iran–Iraq War, and had never been reopened until formally abolished in 1997
Mashhad	Armenia	Consulate	2018	
Mashhad	China	Consulate	1940s	
Mashhad	United Kingdom	Consulate-General	1975	Ceased operations, and building was given to Pakistan
Mashhad	Kazakhstan	Consulate-General	2009	Closed and relocated to Gorgan
Mashhad	Kyrgyzstan	Consulate-General	2020	
Mashhad	Poland	Consulate	Unknown	
Mashhad	Russian Empire	Consulate-General	1917	Closed after the Russian Revolution
Mashhad	Soviet Union	Consulate-General	1979	Closed after the Iranian Revolution
Mashhad	United States	Consulate-General	1979	Closed after the Iranian Revolution
Tabriz	United States	Consulate-General	1979	Closed after 1979 attack on the American consulate-General in Tabriz

== See also ==
- List of diplomatic missions of Iran
- Visa requirements for Iranian citizens
- Foreign Relations of Iran
- Axis of Resistance
- List of diplomatic visits to Iran
- Foreign Direct Investment in Iran
