= International Conference on Supporting Palestine Intifada =

Political event

The International Conference on Supporting Palestine Intifada is a conference on supporting Palestine's Intifada by the Islamic Republic of Iran. Diverse authorities and political activists from different countries of the world participate in the meeting.

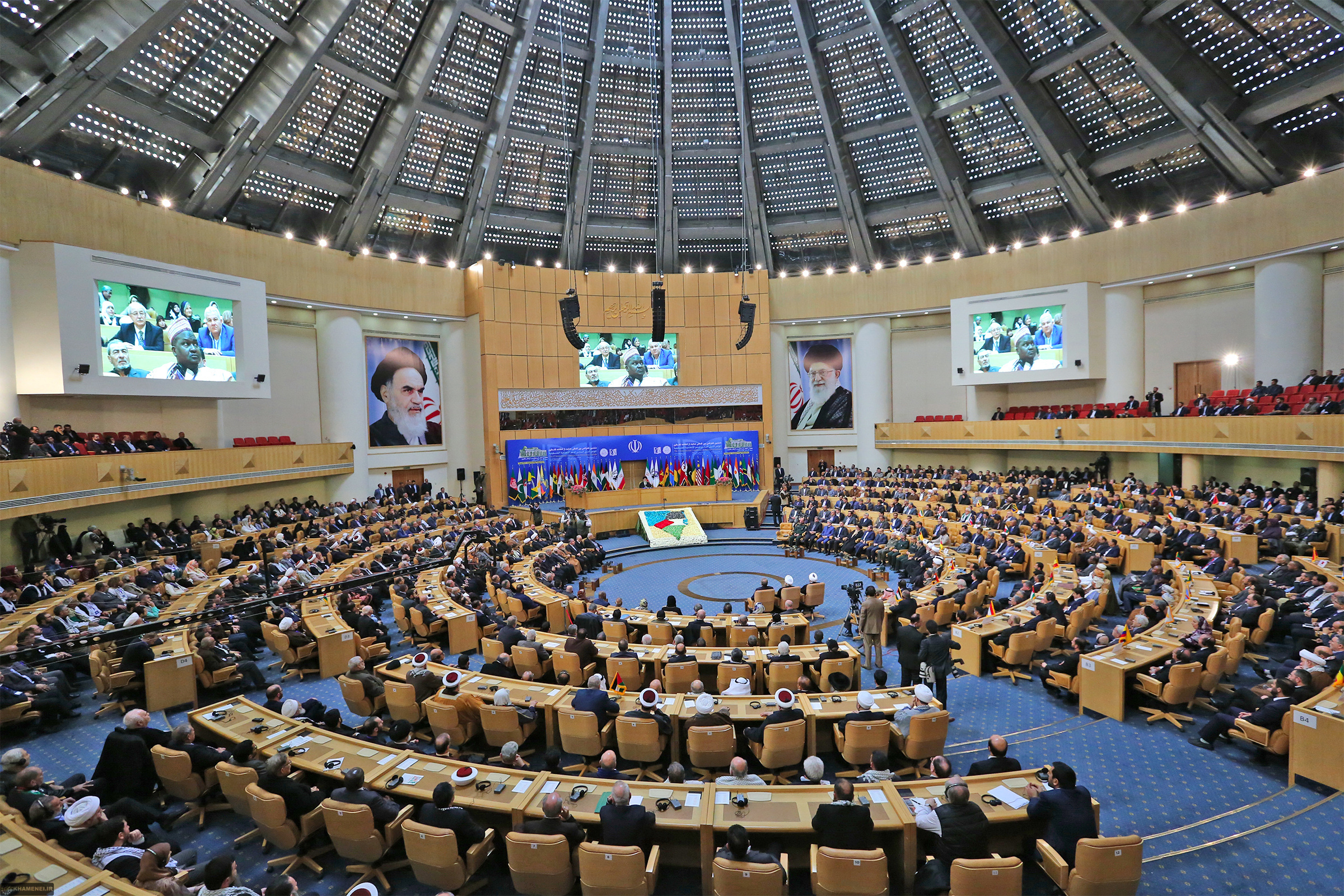
The 6th Conference in Tehran, Iran

== Background ==
The Iranian Parliament passed a law as "Supporting Islamic Revolution Of Palestine" in 1990. According to this law, the Islamic Republic of Iran supports the oppressed people of Palestine; as well as this, it assigns a task for the boards of the directors of the Iranian Parliament to extend its support (in different ways) for Palestinians and to hold a conference(s) till Palestinians regain their rights. The Iranian government has used the conference to highlight anti-Israel discourse.

== The conference 1991–2017 ==
The international conference on supporting Palestine Intifada was held six times between 1991 and 2017: in October 1991, then in 2001, 2006, 2009, 2011, and February 2017.

== The 7th conference ==
During the initial coordination meeting of the 7th International Conference to Support the Palestinian Intifada, the Secretary-General highlighted the significance of the upcoming 45th Quds Day, saying the world was observing the emergence of a novel form of resistance within the occupied territories. He mentioned that Hassan Nasrallah has suggested that engaging in combat with Israel may no longer be necessary, as they are seemingly withdrawing from the occupied territories. He stated the aspiration of the conference to become a tool for creating power, parallel to the battle in the occupied territories, as a soft and comprehensive battle with "the Zionists" in other regions of the world.

== Membership ==
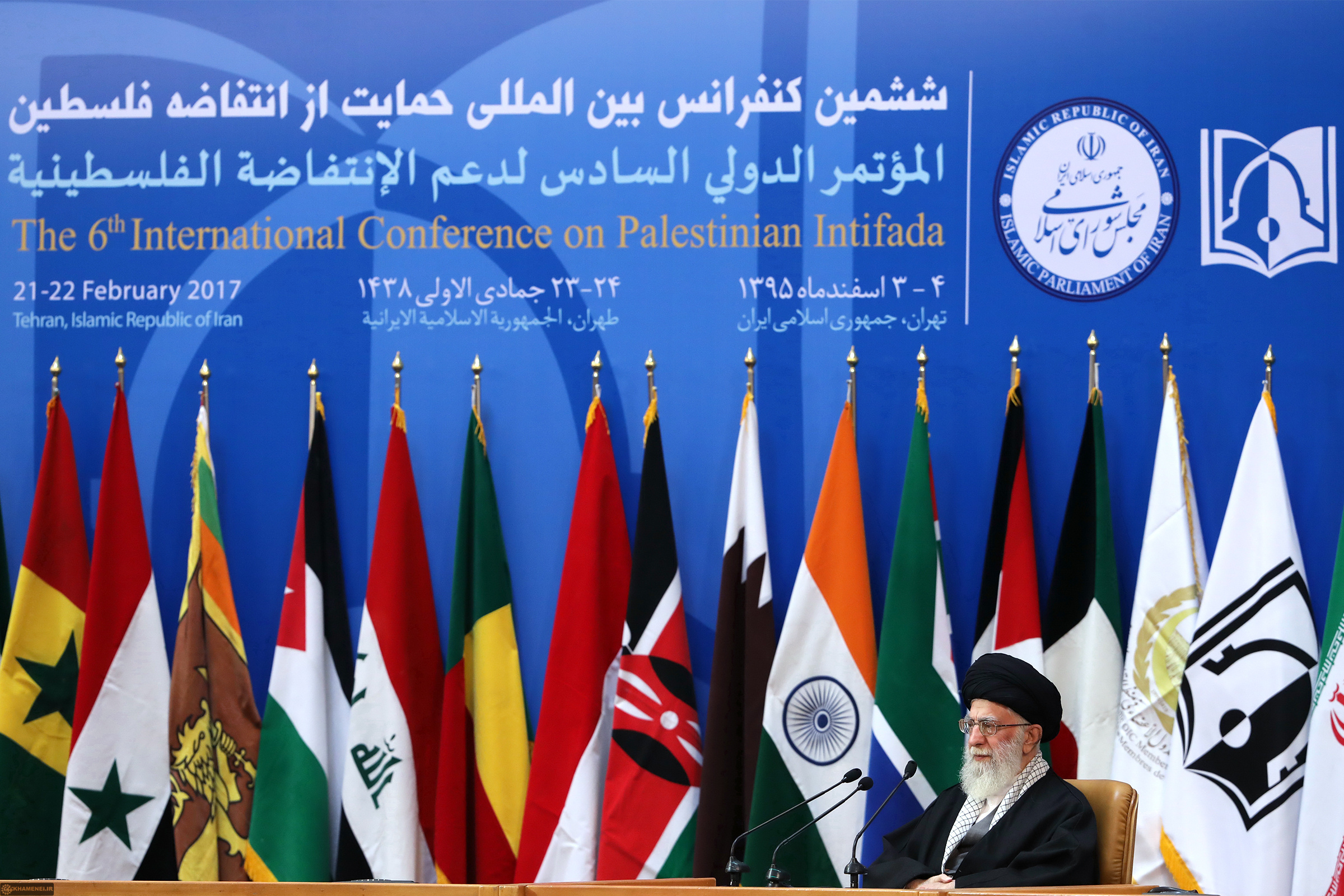
Ayatollah Khamenei's lecture in the 6th Conference in Tehran

There are diverse authorities/political activists from different countries who participate in the conference. For instance, 700 guests from 80 countries of the world participated in the sixth conference, including Iranian high-ranking officials (e.g., the Supreme leader of Iran as the highest-ranking authority in Iran –Ayatollah Ali Khamenei_, (former) President Rouhani, the speaker of the (former) Parliament of Iran Ali Larijani, and others such as:

- Hadiya Khalaf Abbas, the speaker of People's Council of Syria,
- Sami Abu Zuhri, a senior spokesman for the Palestinian organization Hamas.
- Nabih Berri, the speaker of the Parliament of Lebanon.
- Pandikar Amin Mulia, the speaker of the Parliament of Malaysia.
- Ramadan Shalah, the chief of Islamic Jihad Movement in Palestine.
- Naim Qassem, the second in command of Hezbollah with the title of deputy secretary-general.
- Khalid al Ma'awali, the speaker of the Parliament of Oman.

=== Board of Trustees members ===
According to the statute of the secretariat, 4 members of the Islamic Council together with the secretary general constitute the Board of Trustees.

=== The Secretary General ===
Hossein Amirabdollahian is the Secretary General of the International Conference to Support the Palestinian Intifada, following a ruling in 2020 by the Speaker of the Islamic Council (Mohammad Baqer Qalibaf).

== Final statement ==
The participants in the sixth conference, emphasized on the necessity of further attempts to terminate the occupying Palestine and to be pursued for the unity in Palestine lands, and forming the independent country of Palestine, and al-Quds to be its capital. Meanwhile, this statement rejected the "normalization" of the relationship to "the Zionism Regime", and asked all countries to break off their relationship with this regime.

== See also ==
- International Islamic Unity Conference (Iran)
