= Meir Ezri =

One of the ambassadors of Israel

- מאיר עזרי

Israel Ambassador to Iran
- In office 1968–1973
- Preceded by: Zvi Duriel
- Succeeded by: Uri Lubrani

Personal details
- Born: Meir Ezri; 1924 Iran
- Died: 2015 (aged 90–91) Israel
- Parents: Haaji Zion Ezri (father); Zuleikha Ezri (mother)

Meir Ezri (Hebrew: מאיר עזרי; 1924–2015) was the ambassador and the first representative plenipotentiary of the Israeli political representation in Tehran, capital of Iran.

He played an important role in promoting Iran-Israel relations between 1958 and 1975. Meir Ezri was also one of the activists of the Jewish Agency for Israel in Iran and played an important role in facilitating the immigration of Iranian Jews to Israel.

== Book of memories ==
In 2001, Meir Ezri published a memoir called "Anyone of his people among you" (in Hebrew: מי בקלם מכל עמו). Israeli politician Shimon Peres mentioned in the introduction of his book:

From many years ago, perhaps even from the previous generation, Mr. Meir Ezri, one of the leaders of Iranian Jews and Israel's ambassador to Iran, is a well-known figure. It is difficult to find someone among us Israelis who is as well aware of the twists and turns of Iranian history and politics as he is. Meir Ezri knows Iranian language well and is well acquainted with Iranian culture. What we see in the mirror, he sees in the raw adobe.

In the book "Anyone of his people among you", Meir Ezri has shown new angles of the relationship between Israel and Iran in the Pahlavi dynasty era.

== Center for Iran and Persian Gulf Studies ==
With the financial assistance of Meir Ezri, in 2006, a research center was opened in Haifa University to learn the history and culture of Iran and the Persian Gulf region.
