= Quds Day =

Annual event held on the last Friday of Ramadan

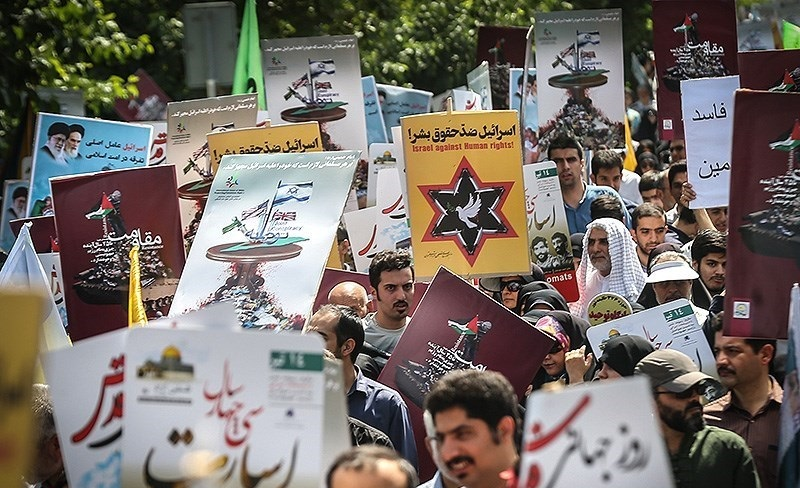
- Quds Day in Tehran, Iran, 2016
- Official name: روز جهانی قدس (Ruz Jahâni Quds)
- Observed by: Arab world, Muslim world, anti-Zionists
- Type: International
- Significance: Demonstrations against Zionism, the State of Israel, and the Israeli occupation of Jerusalem; solidarity with the Palestinian people
- Date: Last Friday of Ramadan
- Frequency: Annual
- Started by: Ruhollah Khomeini
- Related to: Iranian Revolution; Palestinian nationalism Anti-Zionism

Quds Day (lit. 'Jerusalem Day'), officially known as International Quds Day (Persian: روز جهانی قدس, romanized: Ruz Jahâni Quds), is an annual pro-Palestinian event held on the last Friday of the Islamic holy month of Ramadan to express support for Palestinians and oppose Israel and Zionism. It takes its name from the Arabic name for Jerusalem: al-Quds.

The event was first held in 1979 in Iran, shortly after the Iranian Revolution. The day exists partly in opposition to Israel's Jerusalem Day, which has been celebrated by Israelis since May 1968 and was declared a national holiday by the Knesset in 1998. Today, rallies are held on Quds Day in various countries in the Muslim world, as well as in non-Muslim communities around the world, in protest against the Israeli occupation of East Jerusalem.

Critics of Quds Day have argued that it is antisemitic. In Iran, the day is marked by widespread speeches (some featuring Holocaust denial) and rallies that have been frequented by chants of "Death to Israel, Death to America", with crowds trampling and burning Israeli flags. Quds Day rallies have also featured demonstrations against other countries and causes.

== History ==
An annual anti-Zionist day of protest was first suggested by Ebrahim Yazdi, the first foreign minister of the Islamic Republic of Iran, to Ruhollah Khomeini, the leader of the Iranian Revolution. At the time, its predominant context was related to deepening tensions between Israel and Lebanon. Khomeini adopted Yazdi's idea, and on August 7, 1979, he declared the last Friday of every Ramadan as "Quds Day", in which Muslims worldwide would unite in solidarity against Israel and in support of the Palestinians. Khomeini stated that the "liberation" of Jerusalem was a religious duty to all Muslims:

I invite Muslims all over the globe to consecrate the last Friday of the holy month of Ramadan as Al-Quds Day and to proclaim the international solidarity of Muslims in support of the legitimate rights of the Muslim people of Palestine. For many years, I have been notifying the Muslims of the danger posed by the usurper Israel which today has intensified its savage attacks against the Palestinian brothers and sisters, and which, in the south of Lebanon in particular, is continually bombing Palestinian homes in the hope of crushing the Palestinian struggle. I ask all the Muslims of the world and the Muslim governments to join together to sever the hand of this usurper and its supporters. I call on all the Muslims of the world to select as Al-Quds Day the last Friday in the holy month of Ramadan—which is itself a determining period and can also be the determiner of the Palestinian people's fate—and through a ceremony demonstrating the solidarity of Muslims worldwide, announce their support for the legitimate rights of the Muslim people. I ask God Almighty for the victory of the Muslims over the infidels.

— Ruhollah Khomeini, 1979

Senior clerics, including Ayatollah Naser Makarem Shirazi, have described participation in Quds Day as a form of religious worship (ebādat), intended to unite Muslims around the world.

There have been recorded incidents of violence on Quds Day, including 28 people killed and 326 wounded by bombs in 1985 during the Iran–Iraq War. Iran celebrates the event characteristically by putting on public display poster images of the city of Jerusalem, thematic speeches, art exhibitions reflecting the issue, and folkloric events. In Lebanon, Hezbollah marks the occasion by organizing a substantive military parade for the last week of each Ramadan. Since 1989, Jordan has observed the event by hosting academic conferences, whose venue from university to university varies each year. Arab societies generally pay the occasion lip service in order to make a show of solidarity with the cause of Palestinian aspirations for nationhood.

The day is also marked throughout Muslim and Arab countries. In January 1988, during the First Intifada, the Jerusalem Committee of the Organization of the Islamic Conference decided that Quds Day should be commemorated in public events throughout the Arab world. In countries with significant Shia Muslim populations, particularly Lebanon, where Hezbollah organizes Quds Day observances, there is significant attendance at the day's events. Events are also held in Iraq, the Palestinian Gaza Strip, and Syria. Both Hamas and Palestinian Islamic Jihad endorse Quds Day and hold ceremonies. Outside of the Middle East and the wider Arab world, Quds Day protests have taken place in the United Kingdom, Germany, Canada, Sweden, France, the United States, as well as some Muslim countries in Southeast Asia. According to the BBC, while the original idea behind Quds Day was to gather all Muslims in opposition to the existence of Israel, the event has not developed beyond an Iranian experience. Apart from rallies, usually funded and organized by Iran itself in various capital cities, the ritual never took root among Muslims at large.

In a Quds Day sermon on January 23, 1998, former Iranian president Akbar Hashemi Rafsanjani claimed that Israel was "much worse than Hitler." He questioned the Holocaust death toll, stating Hitler had killed "only 200,000 Jews," and dismissed the figure of six million as "a propaganda act by the Zionists." In a Quds Day sermon in 2007, he declared that Hitler's primary aim was to "free Europe from the evils of Zionism," blaming Zionists for political unrest and media control in Europe. He suggested that Nazi policies were a response to Zionist influence, portraying the Holocaust as a consequence of Jewish behavior.

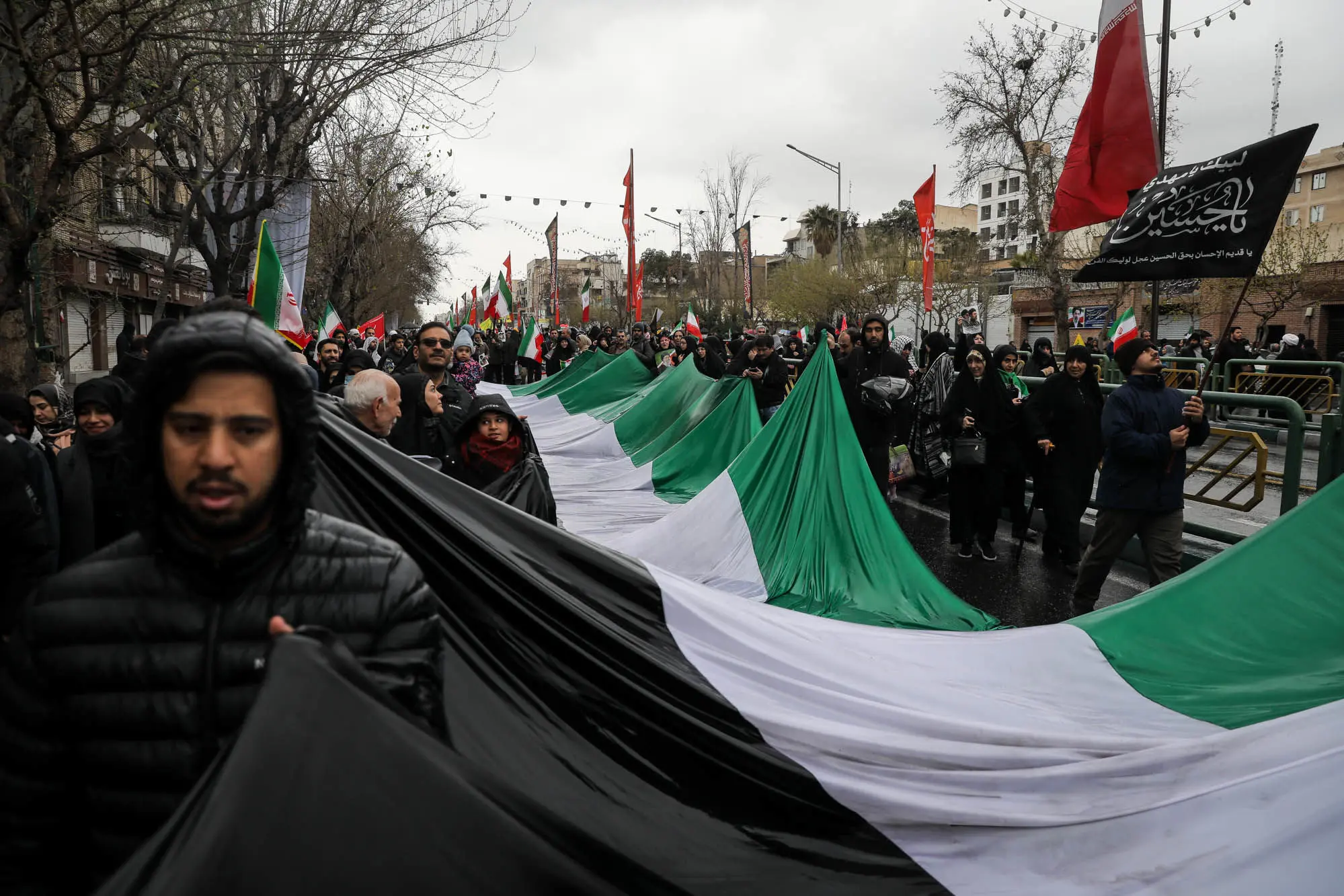
Demonstrators gather in Tehran for the annual International Quds Day rally on March 13, 2026

On Quds Day in June 2017, a digital countdown clock was unveiled in Tehran's Palestine Square, marking the years remaining until Israel's predicted destruction. The clock referenced a 2015 statement by Supreme Leader Khamenei, who declared that "Israel won't exist in 25 years."

Quds Day 2026 took place amid the 2026 Iran war and less than two weeks after Supreme Leader Ayatollah Khamenei was killed in joint United States–Israeli military strikes.

== Quds Day events ==
In Iran, the day's parades are sponsored and organized by the government. Events include mass marches and rallies. Senior Iranian leaders give fiery speeches condemning Israel, as well as the U.S. government. The crowds respond with chants of "Death to Israel" and "Death to America".

Quds Day protests have been held in parts of the Middle East and in London and Berlin and the United States. Marches in London have drawn up to 3,000 people, while Berlin saw 1,600 protestors in 2018. Rallies were held in at least 18 cities across the United States in 2017.

In 2020, for the first time since the initiation four decades ago, the Quds day event was held virtually in Iran amid the COVID-19 pandemic.

== Participation ==
According to Roger Howard, many Iranians under the age of 30 continue to participate in Quds Day events, though proportionately less than those on the streets. He adds that many Iranian students on campus say in private that the Arab–Israeli conflict has "nothing to do with us." According to an April 2024 report by Iran International, many Iranians see the annual Quds Day event as irrelevant and disconnected from the country's dire social and economic realities.

== Controversy ==
In March 2026 the UK government has banned Londons international Quds day march following a request from the Metropolitan Police to prevent serious public disorder. Sarah Sackman described the support for Iran's Islamic Revolutionary Guard Corps, and its proxies as "anti-British" and argued that people promoting hate and hostility should not be allowed to march on London's streets. Static protests that took place were criticised as organisers praised Ayatollah Ali Khamenei, Iran's former supreme leader, killed in U.S. and Israeli strikes during the 2026 Iran war, saying Khamenei was standing on "the right side of history". 12 arrests were made during the London demonstration and counter‑protests, including for support of proscribed organizations, and threatening behaviour.

In March 2026, the government of Ontario, Canada applied to Superior Court for an emergency injunction barring a Quds Day march in Toronto. The claim was the protest had potential for violence, promoted antisemitism, hatred, intimidation and the glorification of terrorism. However, the judge ruled, there was insufficient evidence that the protest would lead to significant criminal activity or that police could not maintain the peace. In particular, the Canadian Charter of Rights and Freedom upholds the right to assemble and speak freely, even in times of global conflict.

== Gallery ==
Washington, D.C., 1996

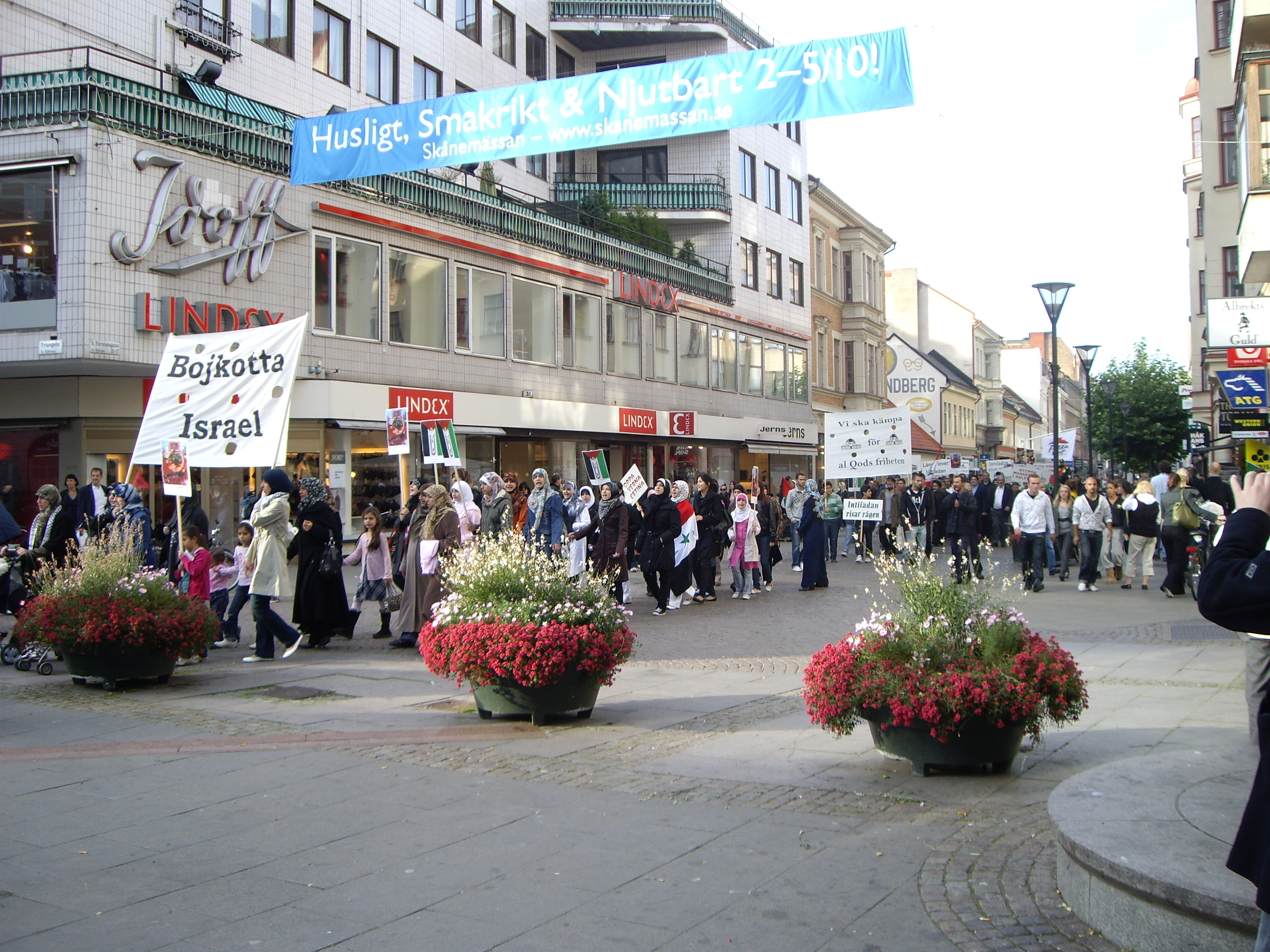
Malmö, 2008

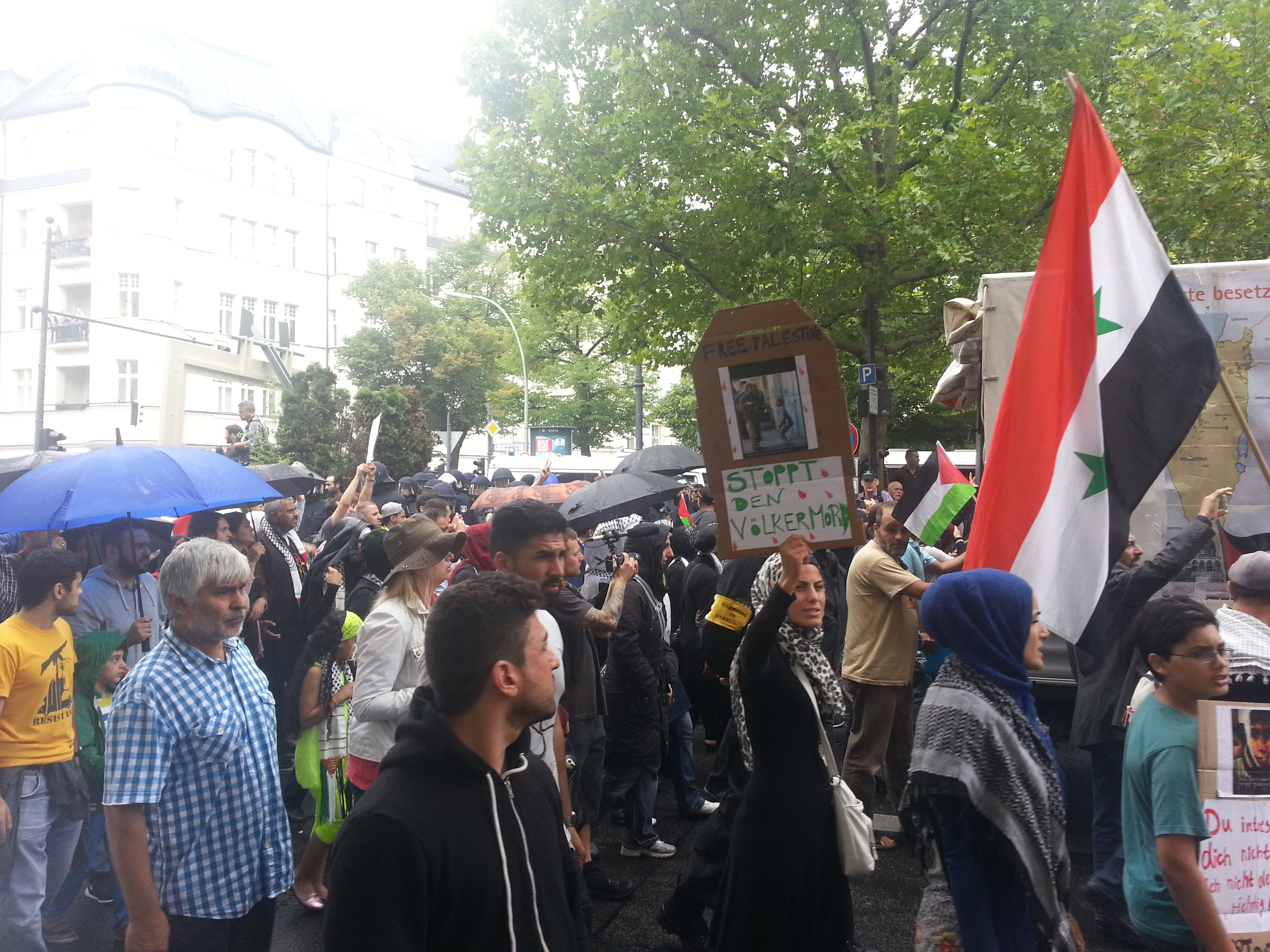
Berlin, 2014

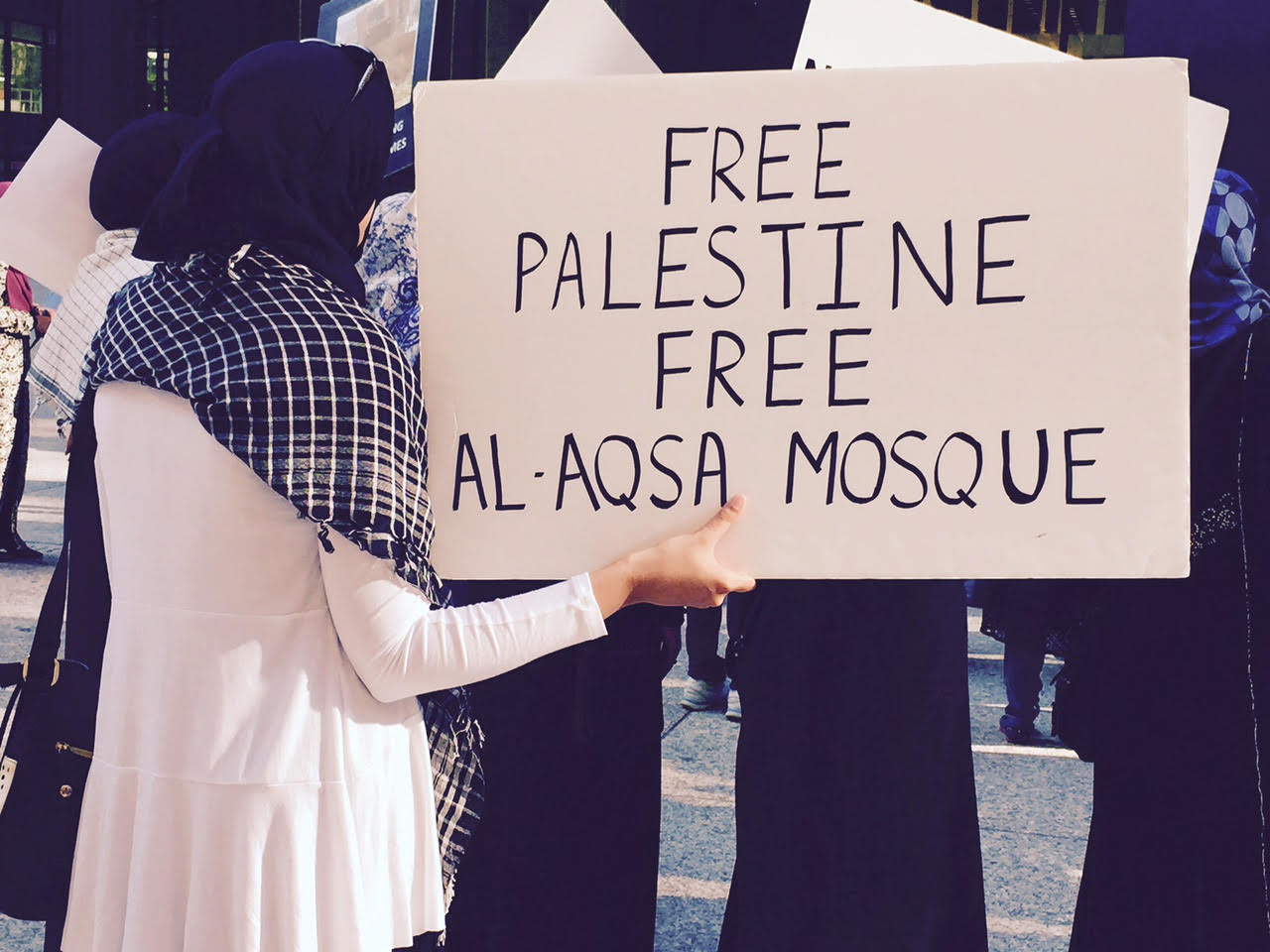
Chicago, 2015

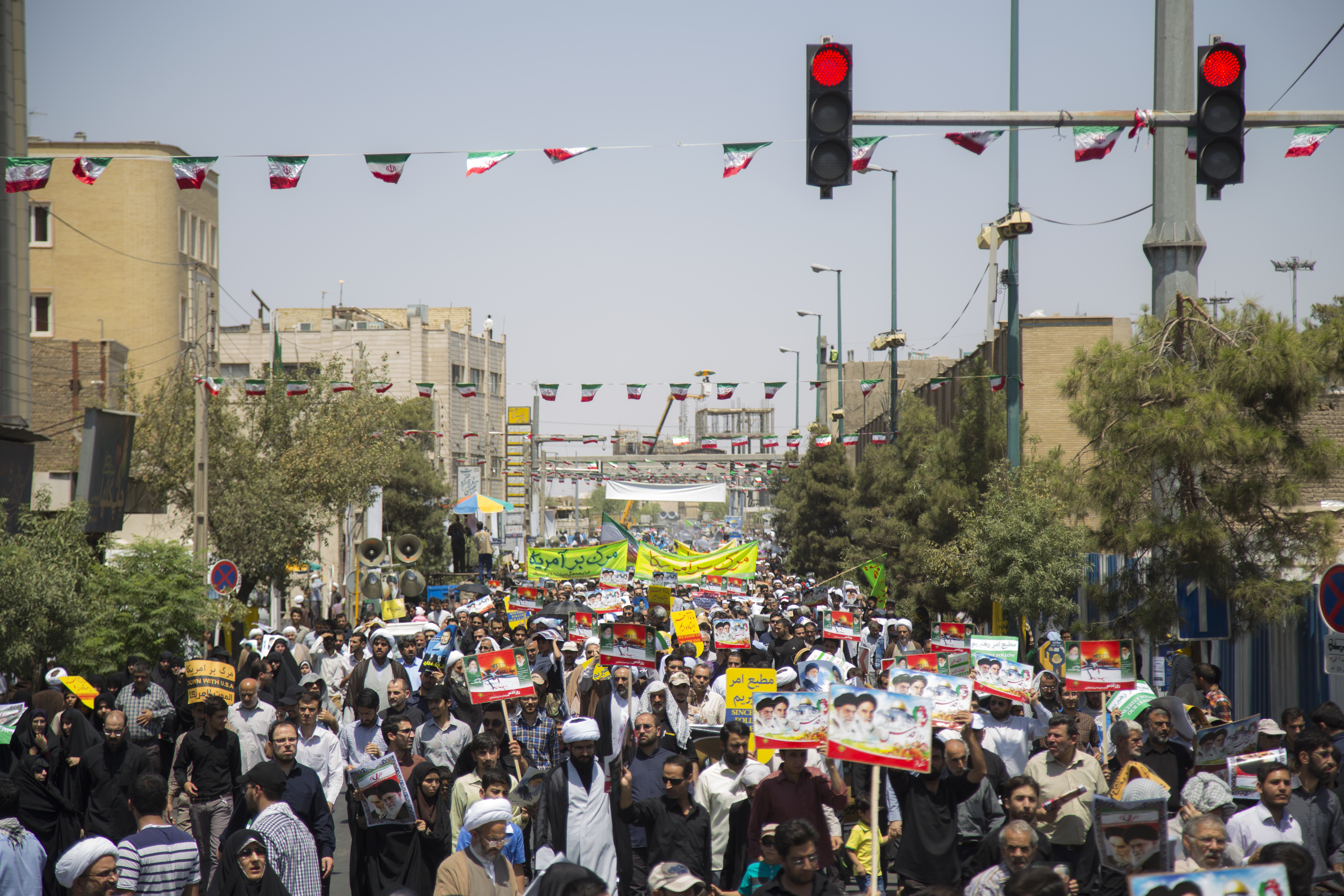
Qom, 2015

Damascus, 2016

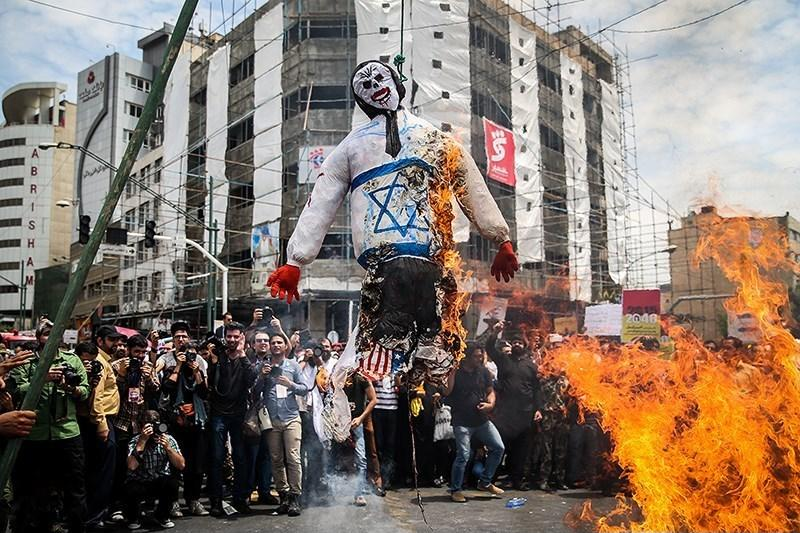
Tehran, 2016

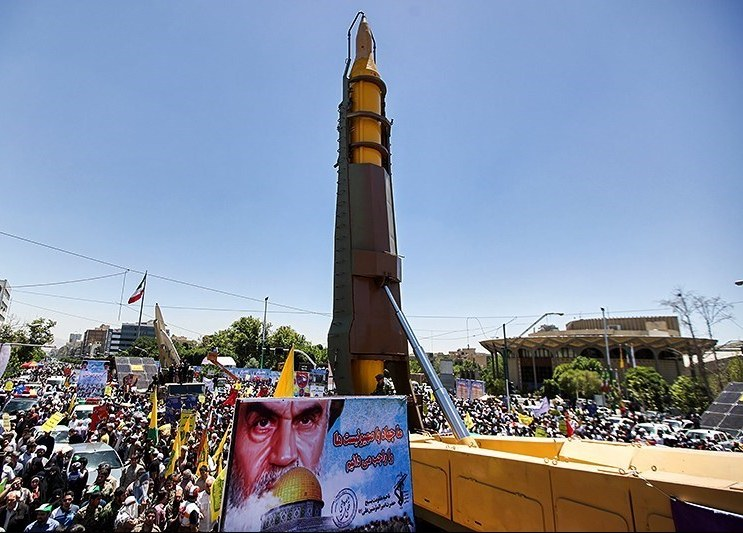
Tehran, 2017

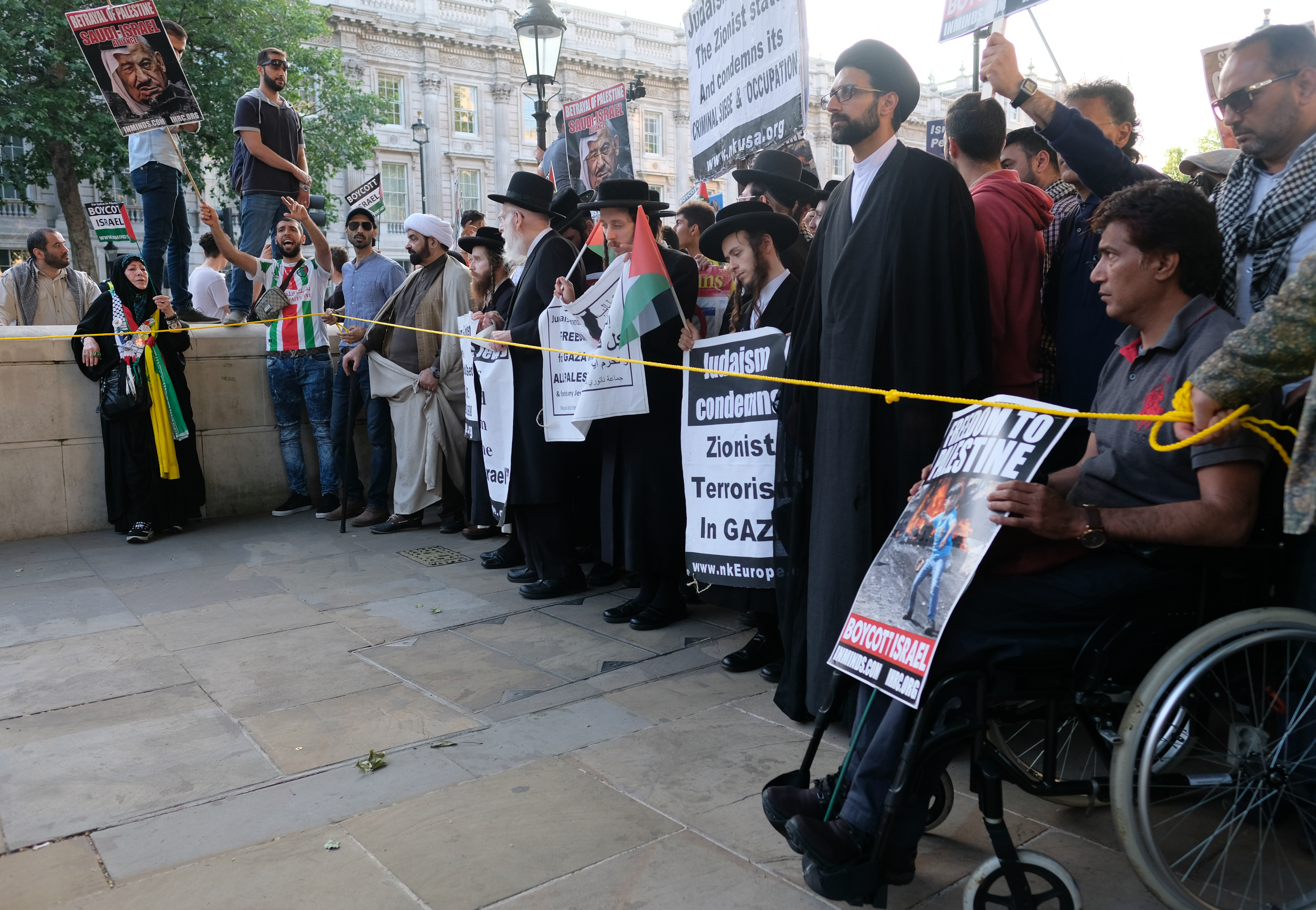
London, 2018

Bauchi, 2026

== See also ==
- Jerusalem Day, in Israel
- Iran–Israel relations
- Jumu'ah-tul-Wida, also on the last Friday in the month of Ramadan
- Quds in Persian literature
- Death to America
