= Death to Israel =

Political slogan

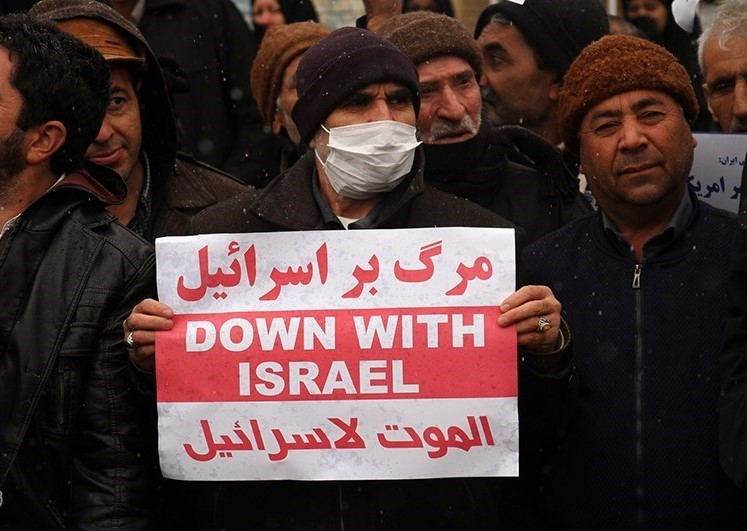
The slogan "Down with Israel" in English, and "Death to Israel" in Arabic and Persian; written on a poster related to a march in Iran. (2017, Bojnord, march condemning the transfer of the capital of Israel to Jerusalem)

"Death to Israel", (Note: Persian: مرگ بر اسرائیل; Arabic: الموت لإسرائيل; Hebrew: מוות לישראל) also translated into English as "Down with Israel", is a political slogan against Israel, which is most often used in Iran. Every year, Iranian pilgrims sing the slogan of "death to Israel" during the Hajj rituals and the ceremony of disavowal of polytheists. This slogan is especially chanted against Israel by demonstrators on Quds Day and is often accompanied by the burning of the Israeli flag. The slogan has also been used in the Islamic Consultative Assembly of Iran.

The slogan has been similarly contextualized to "death to America"; as a reaction to the Israeli government's policies towards Islamic countries and merely an expression of outrage at those policies, not a wish for literal death for Israeli people themselves. Two years after becoming supreme leader, Iran's Ali Khamenei interpreted the slogan as "in destroying the Israeli regime", and in a 2015 speech to university students, the previously mentioned one as "death to the policies of […] arrogant powers".

== Other uses ==
=== Houthi movement ===
The Sarkha, the slogan on the flag of the Houthis in Yemen is as follows: "God is the greatest, Death to America, Death to Israel, curse be upon the Jews, victory to Islam."

The slogan of the Houthis, the Shia militant group in Yemen, which Iran also supports, is "God is greater, death to America, death to Israel, curse to the Jews, victory to Islam". This slogan is also one of the slogans used by Hezbollah in Lebanon. Tariq Alhomayed believes that the slogan of death to Israel in the Arab world has lost its function and holding reconciliation agreements between the Arab countries of the region with Israel is proof of this claim. This slogan, as one of the symbols of hatred against Israel, has been noticed by the rulers of the Middle East region.

== Reactions ==
=== Supporters ===
According to the Islam Quest website, this slogan is permissible due to the "tyranny of the Israeli government". Ali Al Bukhaiti, the former spokesman and the official media face of the Houthis, said: "We really do not want anyone's death. This slogan is only against the intervention of those governments [i.e. the United States and Israel]." Ali Khamenei also considered this slogan as the "slogan of the Iranian nation" and does not consider it specific to one of the Iranian cities. Masoud Jazayeri, the spokesman of the Iranian Armed Forces, also claimed in an interview that: "Cries of death to America, death to England, death to Israel, etc. did not arise overnight; That by saying this reason and that reason, it should be removed from the political discourse of nations wounded by imperialism and arrogance and domination regimes."

=== Opponents ===
Nikki Haley, the former representative of the United States in the United Nations and failed 2024 presidential candidate, in a tweet, considered this slogan, along with the slogan of death to America, as a reason to oppose Iran. She believes that Iran is looking for nuclear weapons and is seeking to realize these two slogans. Akram Meknes, one of the Arabic language writers, considers the slogan of death to Israel as an erosion slogan that does not convince even children these days and has lost its effectiveness. Karim Sadjadpour considers the slogan of death to America, along with death to Israel, as well as the hijab, to be the main foundations of the Islamic Republic of Iran's ideology, which remains for them in the 2020s. Benjamin Netanyahu, referring to this slogan, considers it a proof of the radical atmosphere ruling in Iran.

== Margins ==
Habibah Jaghoori, a student of the University of Adelaide and the editor of that university's student magazine, was fired from the magazine after publishing an anti-Zionist article titled "Death to Israel". That article contains the following content:

The solution to achieving peace and establishing justice for Palestine is to demand the destruction of Israel.
Free Palestine and death to Israel.

— Jaghoori, as quoted by The Times of Israel

== See also ==
- Little Satan
- Political slogans of the Islamic Republic of Iran
- Iran–Israel relations
- Death, death to the IDF
- Palestine Square Countdown Clock
- Israel won't exist in 25 years
