= Iran–Israel proxy conflict =

- Part of the Iran–Israel conflict and Arab–Israeli conflict
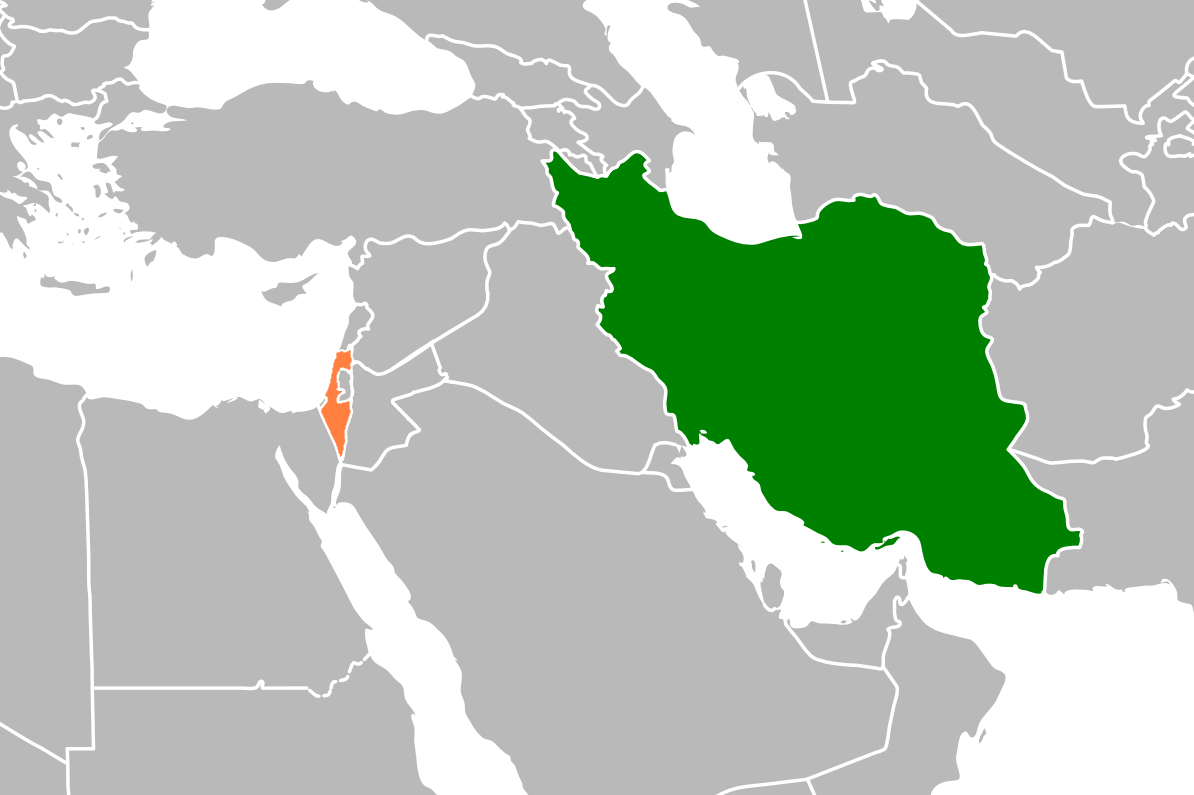
- Israel (orange) and Iran (green) shown within the Middle East
Date	16 February 1985 – present (41 years and 9 months)
Location	Various (primarily Middle East)
Status	Ongoing: Iran reinforces Ba'athist Syria and Hezbollah; Israel tries to prevent weapon transfers to Hezbollah; 2006 Lebanon War ends in military stalemate and Israeli withdrawal; Beginning of the ongoing Gaza–Israel conflict in June 2006; Israel tries to stop the Iranian nuclear program; Iran grows major spheres of influence in the Middle East through its Axis of Resistance; Formation of the Arab–Israeli alliance; Iran provides munitions to Hamas and Palestinian Islamic Jihad (PIJ) in the Gaza Strip; Escalation to a direct conflict between the two countries in 2024, 2025, and 2026

Belligerents
Iran Proxies: Hezbollah; Hamas (2006–2011; 2017–present); Popular Front for the Liberation of Palestine (PFLP) (2013–present); Palestinian Islamic Jihad (PIJ); Popular Front for the Liberation of Palestine – General Command (PFLP–GC) (2013–present); Sabireen Movement (until 2019); Houthis; Popular Mobilization Units; Islamic Resistance in Iraq; PKK (1982–1992); Liwa Fatemiyoun; Husseiniyoun; Liwa Zainebiyoun; Al-Ashtar Brigades	Israel Proxies: South Lebanon Army (until 2000); (Syrian opposition) Fursan al-Joulan (2013–19); Popular Forces of Palestine (2024–present)

Commanders and leaders
(Iran) Ali Khamenei X (Iran) Masoud Pezeshkian (WIA) (Iran) Mohammad Mokhber (Iran) Ebrahim Raisi (Iran) Hassan Rouhani (Iran) Mahmoud Ahmadinejad; Naim Qassem; Hassan Nasrallah X Yahya Sinwar †; Ismail Haniyeh X Khaled Mashal (Popular Front for the Liberation of Palestine) Ahmad Sa'adat (POW) (Palestinian Islamic Jihad) Ziyad al-Nakhalah	(Israel) Benjamin Netanyahu (Israel) Ehud Barak (Israel) Ariel Sharon (Israel) Ehud Olmert (Israel) Naftali Bennett (Israel) Yair Lapid (Palestine) Ghassan Duhine (WIA) (Palestine) Yasser Abu Shabab †; Antoine Lahad

Iran and Israel have been engaged in a proxy conflict since 1985. In the Israeli–Lebanese conflict, Iran has supported Lebanese Shia militias, most notably Hezbollah. In the Israeli–Palestinian conflict, Iran has backed Palestinian groups such as Hamas. (Note: Sometimes included in the "Axis of Resistance".) Israel has supported Iranian rebels, conducted airstrikes against Iranian allies in Syria, assassinated Iranian nuclear scientists, and directly attacked Iranian forces in Syria. In 2024 the proxy war escalated to a series of direct confrontations between the two countries, and in June 2025, they fought a 12-day war, involving the United States. In 2026, Israel and the United States again engaged in another conflict against Iran in the 2026 Iran war, which caused series of spillovers in Iranian strikes on Arab countries and the 2026 Strait of Hormuz crisis.

Motivated by the periphery doctrine, Imperial Iran and Israel had close relations, seeing Arab powers as a common threat. After the 1979 Islamic revolution, Iran cut off relations, but covert ties continued during the subsequent Iran–Iraq War. Iran trained and armed Hezbollah to resist the Israel's 1982 invasion of Lebanon, and continued to back Shia militias throughout the Israeli occupation of Southern Lebanon. Even before 1979, Iranian Islamists had materially supported the Palestinians; after 1979 Iran attempted to form close relations with the Palestine Liberation Organization, and later with Palestinian Islamic Jihad and Hamas. Israel fought a war with Hezbollah in 2006. Israel has fought several wars with Palestinians in and around the Gaza Strip: in 2008–2009, 2012, 2014, 2021 and since 2023. The 1982 Lebanon War and Gaza war have been the deadliest wars of the Arab–Israeli conflict.

Various reasons have been given for the Iran–Israel conflict. Iran and Israel had previously enjoyed warm ties due to common threats, but by the 1990s the USSR had dissolved and Iraq had been weakened. Iranian Islamists have long championed the Palestinian people, whom they perceive as oppressed. Scholars believe that by supporting the Palestinians, Iran seeks greater acceptance among Sunnis and Arabs, both of whom dominate the Middle East. At times, Iran has supported the one-state and the two-state solution as a response to the plight of Palestinians, while the country has also used more inflammatory language to predict Israel's demise. Israel sees Iran as an existential threat. Israel has accused Iran of harboring genocidal intentions, while Iran has accused Israel of conducting a genocide in Gaza. Consequently, Israel has sought sanctions and military action against Iran to stop it from acquiring nuclear weapons. News outlets expressed how Iranian proxy militias stayed largely silent and left Iran "isolated in war" during the 2025 war with Israel.

== Background ==
Iranian Islamists have a long history of sympathizing with the Palestinians. In 1949, Iranian ayatollah Mahmoud Taleghani visited the West Bank and was moved by the plight of Palestinian refugees. Taleghani began advocating for Palestinians in the 1950s and 1960s. After the Six-Day War in 1967, he raised funds (e.g. zakat) inside Iran to be sent to Palestinians. The Iranian government at the time was alarmed at these activities and SAVAK documents indicate that the government believed that the Iranian public was sympathetic to the Palestinian people. Likewise Ruhollah Khomeini championed the Palestinian people before he became Iran's Supreme Leader in 1979. He also criticized the Pahlavi dynasty's ties with Israel, viewing Israel as a supporter of the Pahlavi regime. Following the 1979 Iranian revolution, Khomeini's new government adopted a policy of hostility towards Israel. The new Iranian government saw Israel as a colonial outpost. Iran withdrew recognition of Israel as a state, and severed all diplomatic, commercial and other ties with Israel, referring to its government as the "Zionist regime" and Israel as "occupied Palestine".

Despite the tension between the two countries, Israel provided support to Iran during the Iran–Iraq War from 1980 to 1988. During the war, Israel was one of the main suppliers of military equipment to Iran and also provided military instructors. Israel gave direct support to Iran's war effort when it bombed and destroyed Iraq's Osirak nuclear reactor in Operation Babylon. The nuclear reactor was considered a central component of Iraq's nuclear weapons program.

The 1982 Israeli invasion of Lebanon resulted in the departures of the Palestine Liberation Organization (PLO) from Lebanon. The ensuing Israeli occupation of Southern Lebanon temporarily benefited Israeli allies in Lebanon and the civilian Israeli population with fewer violent attacks on Northern Israel by Hezbollah than previously by PLO in the 1970s. However, the Sabra and Shatila massacre perpetrated by Israeli proxies (the Maronite Lebanese Forces and right-wing Phalangists) against Lebanese Shias had as a long-term consequence the emergence of a homegrown Lebanese, rather than Palestinian, resistance movement within South Lebanon, which by the second half of the 1990s was posing more strategic trouble to Israel than the PLO could pose in the 1970s.

Iran has periodically called for the destruction of Israel. Iran has established a network of allies and proxy forces across the Middle East, which it describes as part of an "axis of resistance" aimed at opposing US and Israeli interests in the area. Israel views Iran as an existential threat on account of Tehran's rhetoric, its support for proxy forces in the region, and its arming and financing of Palestinian groups such as Hamas. In some cases, proxy groups evolved into political parties, a transition that was both encouraged and nurtured by Iran. These dual-role proxies earned political legitimacy while masking terrorist activities. U.S. intelligence officials said they believe Iran does not seek a broader conflict, arguing that the primary goal of Iranian proxies is to target Israel and the United States in a way that avoids triggering a large-scale war. The United States is considered to be Israel's largest "military backer". Germany, Britain, and Italy have also supplied weapons to Israel.

As detailed by the Stimson Center, Iran has historically employed at least four main fronts: Hamas in Gaza, Hezbollah in Lebanon, Shiʿite militias in Iraq, and the Houthis in Yemen. According to the report the goal is to compel Israel to defend on multiple fronts simultaneously, reducing its ability to focus on Iranian nuclear or military capabilities and pressure Israel indirectly.

== History ==
=== Relationship with PLO ===
Starting in the 1960s, many Iranians (both leftist and religious) had volunteered to fight against Israel with various Palestinian organizations, including the Palestinian Liberation Organization (PLO). Some of these volunteers, who had received training in Lebanon and Jordan, then returned to Iran to fight against the Shah.

Yasser Arafat visited Iran on 17 February 1979, becoming the first foreign leader to visit the country after the Islamic Revolution. During Arafat's visit, Iran severed ties with Israel and expelled Israeli diplomats. The PLO found Iran's revolution inspiring, given that Khomenei, who had been exiled from his homeland, defeated a militarily powerful enemy supported by the US, something that the PLO thought it could replicate against Israel. On the other hand, Palestinians felt Arab nationalism was at a dead end. Arabs were defeated in the 1967 war, Jordan expelled the PLO in 1970 and Egypt recognized Israel in 1978.

During the Iran hostage crisis, the PLO attempted to mediate with the Iranian students, but failed. In addition, secret documents were allegedly discovered at the US embassy detailing Israeli support for the Shah's regime.

At the start of the Iran–Iraq War, Yasser Arafat tried to mediate between Saddam Hussein and Khomenei. Arafat feared the war would distract from the Palestinian cause. Arafat travelled personally on 20 September 1980, to Baghdad and Tehran, but his efforts were unsuccessful. Arafat eventually sided with Iraq during the war. Despite this, Iranian leaders kept a pro-Palestinian stance.

=== Iran under Khomeini (1979–1989) ===
Following the Iranian Revolution and the fall of the Pahlavi dynasty in 1979, Iran adopted a strong anti-Israel stance. Iran cut off all official relations with Israel. Iran also ceased to accept Israeli passports, and the holders of Iranian passports were banned from travelling to "the occupied Palestine". The Israeli Embassy in Tehran was closed and handed over to the PLO. Ayatollah Khomeini declared Israel an "enemy of Islam" and the "Little Satan". The United States was called the "Great Satan" while the Soviet Union was called the "Lesser Satan". Iran provided support for Islamist-Shia Lebanese parties, helping to consolidate them into a single political and military organization, Hezbollah, and providing them the ideological indoctrination, military training and equipment to attack Israeli and American targets.

=== Israeli occupation of Lebanon ===
In 1982, Israel invaded Lebanon. The leaders of the Lebanese Shia community appealed to Iran for help. Khomeini sent his defense minister and military leaders to Syria to assist, however he eventually concluded that Iran could not fight a two-front war given its ongoing war with Iraq.

Despite Israeli success in eradicating PLO bases and partial withdrawal in 1985, the Israeli invasion had actually increased the severity of conflict with local Lebanese militias and resulted in the consolidation of several local Shia Muslim movements in Lebanon, including Hezbollah and Amal, from a previously unorganized guerrilla movement in the south. Over the years, military casualties of both sides grew higher, as both parties used more modern weaponry, and Hezbollah progressed in its tactics.

Iran supplied the militant organization Hezbollah with substantial amounts of training, weapons, explosives, financial, political, diplomatic, and organizational aid while persuading Hezbollah to take action against Israel. Hezbollah's 1985 manifesto listed among its four main goals "Israel's final departure from Lebanon as a prelude to its final obliteration." According to reports released in February 2010, Hezbollah received $400 million from Iran. By the early 1990s, Hezbollah, with support from Syria and Iran, emerged as the leading group and military power, monopolizing the directorship of the guerrilla activity in South Lebanon.

=== 2000s ===
==== Shabaa Farms conflict ====
Since Israel withdrew from Southern Lebanon and Hezbollah took over the assets of the South Lebanon Army in May 2000, the conflict continued at low-level, centering around the Shabaa Farms region.

With the election of Iranian hardliner Mahmoud Ahmadinejad in 2005, relations between Iran and Israel became increasingly tense as the countries engaged in a series of proxy conflicts and covert operations against each other.

==== 2006 War ====
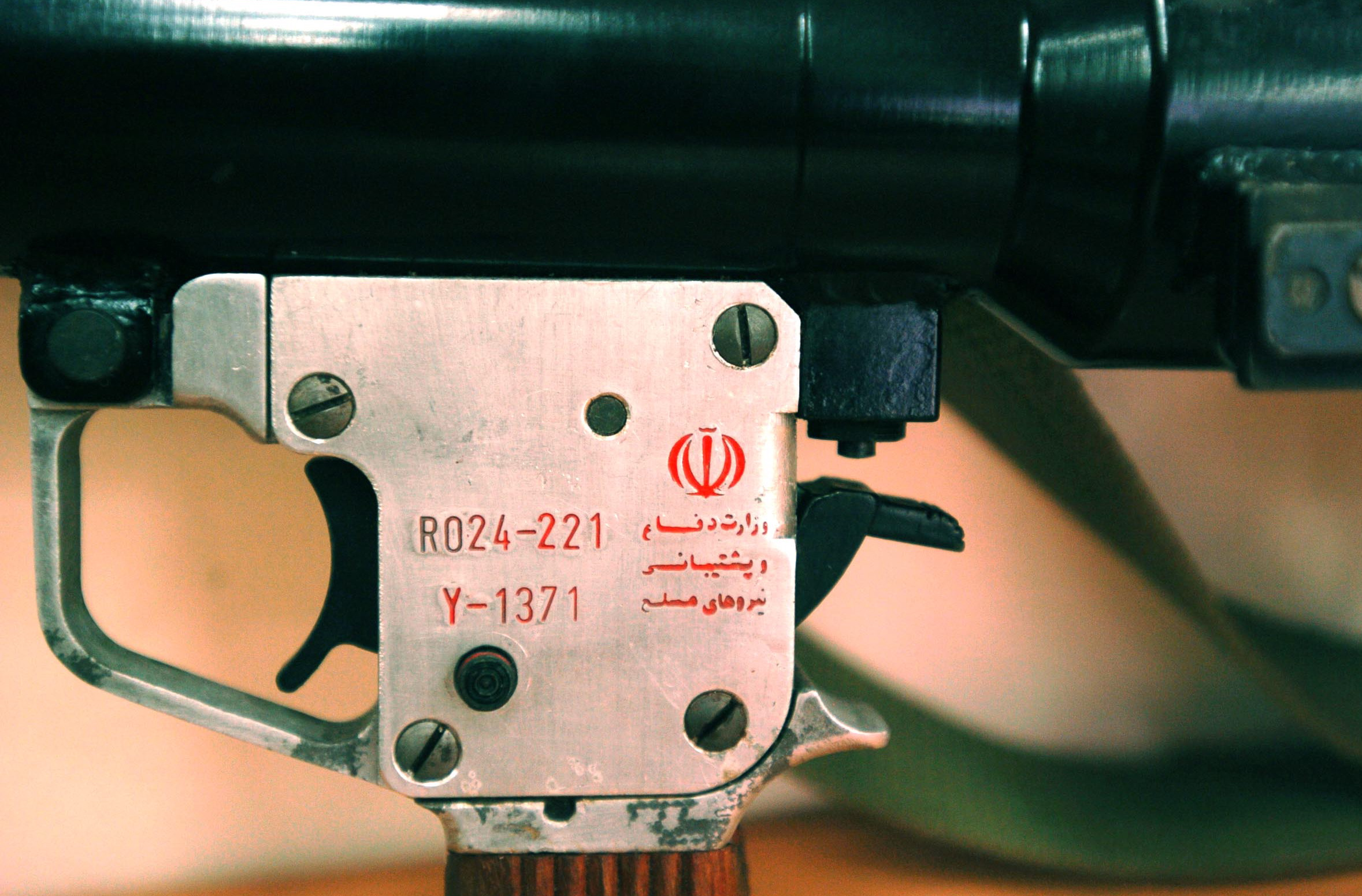
A grenade launcher with Iranian Army branding displayed by Israel as "found in Lebanon during the 2006 Lebanon War"

During the 2006 Lebanon War, Iranian Revolutionary Guards (IRGC) were believed to have directly assisted Hezbollah fighters in their attacks on Israel. Multiple sources suggested that hundreds of Revolutionary Guard operatives participated in the firing of rockets into Israel during the war, and secured Hezbollah's long-range missiles. Revolutionary Guard operatives were allegedly seen operating openly at Hezbollah outposts during the war. In addition, Revolutionary Guard operatives were alleged to have supervised Hezbollah's attack on the INS Hanit with a C-802 anti-ship missile. The attack severely damaged the warship and killed four crewmen. It is alleged that between six and nine Revolutionary Guard operatives were killed by the Israeli military during the war. According to the Israeli media, their bodies were transferred to Syria and from there flown to Tehran. On 6 September 2007, the Israeli Air Force destroyed a suspected nuclear reactor in Syria, with ten North Koreans reportedly killed.

==== Evolving Iranian support to Hamas ====
During and immediately after the Gaza War, the Israeli Air Force, with the assistance of Israeli commandos, was reported to have allegedly carried out three airstrikes against Iranian arms being smuggled to Hamas through Sudan, as Iran launched an intensive effort to supply Hamas with weapons and ammunition. Israel hinted that it was behind the attacks. Two truck convoys were destroyed, and an arms-laden ship was sunk in the Red Sea.

On 4 November 2009, Israel captured a ship in the eastern Mediterranean Sea and its cargo of hundreds of tons of weapons allegedly bound from Iran to Hezbollah.

=== Proxy conflicts and sabotage ===
==== 2010 ====
In June 2010 Stuxnet, an advanced computer worm was discovered. It is believed that it had been developed by US and Israel to attack Iran's nuclear facilities. In a study conducted by ISIS it was estimated that Stuxnet might have damaged as many as 1,000 centrifuges (10% of all installed) in the Natanz enrichment plant. Other computer viruses and malware, including Duqu and Flame, were reportedly related to Stuxnet. Iran claims that its adversaries regularly engineer sales of faulty equipment and attacks by computer viruses to sabotage its nuclear program.

==== 2011 ====
On 15 March 2011, Israel seized a ship from Syria bringing Iranian weapons to Gaza. In addition, the Mossad was also suspected of being responsible for an explosion that reportedly damaged the nuclear facility at Isfahan. Iran denied that any explosion had occurred, but The Times reported damage to the nuclear plant based on satellite images, and quoted Israeli intelligence sources as saying that the blast indeed targeted a nuclear site, and was "no accident". Hours after the blast took place, Hezbollah fired two rockets into northern Israel. The Israel Defense Forces reacted by firing four artillery shells at the area from where the launch originated. It was speculated that the attack was ordered by Iran and Syria as a warning to Israel. The Israeli attack was reported to have killed 7 people, including foreign nationals. Another 12 people were injured, of whom 7 later died in hospital.

The Mossad was suspected of being behind an explosion at a Revolutionary Guard missile base in November 2011. The blast killed 17 Revolutionary Guard operatives, including General Hassan Moqaddam, described as a key figure in Iran's missile program. Israeli journalist Ron Ben-Yishai wrote that several lower-ranked Iranian missile experts had probably been previously killed in several explosions at various sites.

In response to Israeli covert operations, Iranian agents reportedly began trying to hit Israeli targets; potential targets were then placed on high alert. Yoram Cohen, the head of Shin Bet, claimed that three planned attacks in Turkey, Azerbaijan and Thailand were thwarted at the last minute. On 11 October 2011, the United States claimed to have foiled an alleged Iranian plot that included bombing the Israeli and Saudi embassies in Washington DC and Buenos Aires.

==== 2012 ====
On 13 February 2012, Israeli embassy staff in Georgia and India were targeted. In Georgia, a car bomb failed to explode near the embassy and was safely detonated by Georgian police. In India, the car bomb exploded, injuring four people. Amongst the wounded was the wife of an Israeli Defense Ministry employee. Israel accused Iran of being behind the attacks. The following day, three alleged Iranian agents were uncovered in Bangkok, Thailand, thought to have been planning to kill Israeli diplomatic officials, including the ambassador, by attaching bombs to embassy cars. The cell was uncovered when one of their bombs exploded. Police responded, and the Iranian agent present at the house threw an explosive device at officers that tore his legs off, and was subsequently taken into custody. A second suspect was arrested as he tried to catch a flight out of the country, and the third escaped to Malaysia, where he was arrested by Royal Malaysian Police. Thai police subsequently arrested two people suspected of involvement. Indian police arrested a Delhi-based journalist in connection with February's car bomb. Journalist Syed Mohammed Kazmi was arrested on 6 March 2012, after being in contact with a suspect that police believe might have stuck a magnetic bomb to the diplomat's car. It is said Kazmi was an Indian citizen who worked for an Iranian publication.

On 18 July 2012, a bus carrying Israeli tourists in Bulgaria was destroyed in a bombing attack that killed five Israeli tourists and the Bulgarian driver, and injured 32 people. Israeli prime minister Benjamin Netanyahu blamed Iran and Hezbollah for the attack. In July 2012, a senior Israeli defense official stated that since May 2011, more than 20 terrorist attacks planned by Iranians or suspected Hezbollah agents against Israeli targets worldwide had been foiled, including in South Africa, Azerbaijan, Kenya, Turkey, Thailand, Cyprus, Bulgaria, Nepal, Nigeria, and Peru, and that Iranian and Hezbollah operatives were incarcerated in jails throughout the world.

On 6 October 2012, Israeli airplanes shot down a small UAV as it flew over northern Negev. Hezbollah confirmed it sent the drone and Nasrallah said in a televised speech that the drone's parts were manufactured in Iran.

On 24 October 2012, Sudan claimed that Israel had bombed a munitions factory, allegedly belonging to Iran's Revolutionary Guard, south of Khartoum.

In November 2012, Israel reported that an Iranian ship was being loaded with rockets to be exported to countries within range of Israel and that Israel "will attack and destroy any shipment of arms".

==== 2013 ====
In January 2013, rumors were released that the Fordow Fuel Enrichment Plant had been hit by an explosion. Further reports by IAEA concluded that there had been no such incident.

On 25 April 2013, an Israeli aircraft shot down a drone off the coast of Haifa, allegedly belonging to Hezbollah.

On 7 May 2013, residents of Tehran reported hearing three blasts in an area where Iran maintains its missile research and depots. Later, an Iranian website said the blasts occurred at a privately owned chemical factory.

On 10 December, Hamas announced that they have resumed ties with Iran after a brief cut off over the Syrian conflict.

==== 2014 ====
A court in Jerusalem has sentenced an Israeli man, Yitzhak Bergel, to four-and-a-half years in prison for offering to spy for Iran. Bergel belongs to the anti-Zionist Jewish group Neturei Karta.

On 5 March 2014, the Israeli navy intercepted the Klos-C cargo ship. Israel stated Iran was using the vessel to smuggle dozens of long-range rockets to Gaza, including Syrian-manufactured M-302 rockets. The operation, named Full Disclosure and carried out by Shayetet 13 special forces, took place in the Red Sea, 1,500 kilometers away from Israel and some 160 kilometers from Port Sudan.

Iranian media reported that on 24 August 2014, the IRGC had shot down an Israeli drone near Natanz fuel enrichment plant. The Israeli military did not comment on the reports.

Two workers were killed in an explosion that took place at a military explosives factory southeast of Tehran, near the suspected nuclear reactor in Parchin. In what seemed to be a response ordered by Iran, Hezbollah set off an explosive device on the border between Lebanon and the Israeli-controlled side of the Shebaa farms, wounding two Israeli soldiers. Israel responded with artillery fire toward two Hezbollah positions in southern Lebanon.

=== During the Syrian civil war ===
Israel and Syria have observed a truce since Israel reaffirmed its control of most of the Golan Heights in the 1973 Yom Kippur War, but the Syrian Civil War, which began in 2011, has led to several incidents of fire exchange across the borders. The Israeli military was reported to be preparing itself for potential threats in case of a potential power vacuum in Syria. "After Assad and after establishing or strengthening their foothold in Syria, they are going to move and deflect their effort and attack Israel," an Israeli official told the Associated Press in January 2014. Some experts say that while the encroaching militant forces on Israel's border will heighten security measures, the advancements are not likely to create significant changes to Israel's policy disengagement in the Syria crisis.

In the Syrian Civil War, hoping to bolster its logistics and force projection capabilities in the area, Tehran aims to clear a path from the Iranian capital to Damascus and the Mediterranean coast. The Israeli government is convinced that Iran is interested in creating territorial contiguity from Iran to the Mediterranean and in transferring military forces – including naval vessels, fighter planes and thousands of troops – to permanent bases in Syria and is trying to "Lebanonize" Syria and take over using Shi'ite militias, as it had done with Hezbollah in Lebanon. As Israeli Defence Minister Avigdor Lieberman has warned, "everything possible will be done to prevent the existence of a Shi'ite corridor from Tehran to Damascus". In 2017, Israeli intelligence discovered an Iranian base being built in Syria just 50 km from the Israeli border.

The assistance provided by Iran's IRGC Quds Force under General Qasem Soleimani, Hezbollah, and Russia to the Syrian government enabled Bashar al-Assad to emerge victorious from the war in 2017, which ensured that the "worst-case scenario" for Israel, a contiguous "Axis of Resistance" stretching from Iran and Iraq through Syria to the Lebanese-Israeli border, had been realized. Mossad director Yossi Cohen said in 2018 that Israel's failure to prevent an Assad victory in Syria, together with Israel's failure to defeat Hezbollah in 2006, had meant that "[Iranian General] Qasem Soleimani, should he be so minded, could drive his car from Tehran to Lebanon's border with Israel without being stopped. And the same route would be open to truckloads of rockets bound for Iran's main regional proxy, Hezbollah."

==== Covert operations (2013–2017) ====
On several occasions between 2013 and 2017 Israel reportedly carried out or supported attacks on Hezbollah and Iranian targets within Syrian territories or Lebanon. One of the first reliably reported incidents took place on 30 January 2013, when Israeli aircraft struck a Syrian convoy allegedly transporting Iranian weapons to Hezbollah. Habitually, Israel refused to comment on the incident, a stance that is believed to seek to ensure that the Syrian government did not feel obliged to retaliate.

More incidents were attributed to the Israeli Air Force (IAF) in May 2013, December 2014 and April 2015. Some of those reports were confirmed by the Syrian Arab Republic, whereas others were denied. Israel systematically refused to comment on alleged targeting of Hezbollah and Ba'athist Syrian targets in Syrian territory. In 2015, suspected Hezbollah militants launched a retaliatory attack on Israeli forces in Shebaa farms as a response to an Israeli airstrike in the Syrian Golan that killed Hezbollah and IRGC senior operatives. In March 2017, Syria launched anti-aircraft missiles towards the Israeli-occupied part of the Golan Heights, allegedly targeting Israeli IAF aircraft, which Syria claimed were on their way to attack targets in Palmyra in Syria. After the incident, the State of Israel stated it was targeting weapons shipments headed toward anti-Israeli forces, specifically Hezbollah, located in Lebanon. Israel denied Syria's claim that one jet fighter was shot down and another damaged. Israel has not reported any pilots or aircraft missing in Syria, or anywhere else in the Middle East following the incident. According to some sources, the incident was the first time Israeli officials clearly confirmed an Israeli strike on a Hezbollah convoy during the Syrian Civil War. As of September 2017, this was the only time such confirmation was issued.

In January 2014, Israeli prime minister Benjamin Netanyahu warned that Iran's nuclear program would only be set back six weeks as a result of its interim agreement with the international community. In one of the region's oddest pairings, Israel and the Gulf Arab states led by Saudi Arabia increasingly are finding common ground – and a common political language – on their mutual dismay over the prospect of a nuclear deal in Geneva that could curb Tehran's atomic program but leave the main elements intact, such as uranium enrichment. In June 2017, former Israeli Defense Minister Moshe Ya'alon stated that "We and the Arabs, the same Arabs who organized in a coalition in the Six-Day War to try to destroy the Jewish state, today find themselves in the same boat with us ... The Sunni Arab countries, apart from Qatar, are largely in the same boat with us since we all see a nuclear Iran as the number one threat against all of us".

==== Open engagement (2017–2018) ====
Beginning in January 2017, the Israeli Air Force began flying almost daily attack missions against Iranian targets in Syria, dropping about 2,000 bombs in 2018 alone. Some Iranian targets were also attacked by Israeli surface-to-surface missiles or in raids by Israeli special forces. According to former IDF chief of staff Gadi Eizenkot, the decision to strike Iranian bases in Syria was made after Iran changed its strategy in 2016 as the US-led military intervention against ISIL was drawing to an end, planning to exploit the power vacuum to establish hegemony in Syria, building bases and bringing in foreign Shiite fighters. Although the full extent of the campaign would not be revealed until 2019, by early December 2017 the Israeli Air Force confirmed it had attacked arms convoys of Ba'athist Syria and Lebanon's Hezbollah nearly 100 times during more than six years of the conflict in Syria. In January 2019, Eizenkot claimed that up to that point, only a few dozen Iranian military personnel had been killed in the attacks, as Israel had taken care to primarily target Iranian infrastructure while sparing personnel so as not to give Iran any pretext to retaliate.

==== Heist of Iranian nuclear secrets in 2018 ====
It was reported that the Mossad stole nuclear secrets from a secure warehouse in Tehran in January 2018. According to reports, the agents came in a truck semitrailer at midnight, cut into dozens of safes with "high intensity torches", and carted out "50,000 pages and 163 compact discs of memos, videos and plans" before leaving in time to make their escape when the guards came for the morning shift at 7 am. According to the Israelis, the documents and files (which it shared with European countries and the United States), demonstrated that the Iranian AMAD Project aimed to develop nuclear weapons, that Iran had a nuclear program when it claimed to have "largely suspended it", and that there were two nuclear sites in Iran that had been hidden from inspectors. This was followed by the Trump administration withdrawing the United States from the JCPOA and reimposing US sanctions on Iran. Shortly after retiring as head of Mossad, Yossi Cohen admitted he oversaw the operation to steal the Iranian documents during a televised interview in June 2021. Benjamin Netanyahu's 2022 book revealed several new details of the operation, including an intent to sabotage the nuclear program by stealing irreplaceable documents, in addition to proving its mere existence.

=== Syria, Iraq and Lebanon (2019–2020) ===
In July 2019, it was reported that Israel had expanded its strikes against Iranian missile shipments to Iraq, with Israeli F-35 combat planes allegedly striking Iranian targets in Iraq twice. Israeli airstrikes reportedly targeted Iran-backed militias in Iraq during 2019.

On 16 September 2019, air strikes, targeting three positions of the Iranian Revolutionary Guards and allied Iraqi militias, killed at least 10 pro-Iranian militiamen in Albu Kamal, Syria. The strikes were allegedly blamed on Israel. According to Time, the increase of Iran-Israel tension concurs with discussion of a possible rapprochement between Iran and the U.S.

According to Lebanese media reports, on 26 August 2019, Israeli drones attacked a Popular Front for the Liberation of Palestine (PFLP) position in Qousaya, located in the Beqaa Valley of Lebanon, close to the border with Syria. The attack came a day after two drones exploded in the Lebanese capital Beirut. According to an official from the Palestinian position in the town three air strikes hit the PFLP-GC military position in Quasaya early morning 26 August 2019 causing only material damage.

On 27 July 2020, explosions and exchange of fire were heard during a "security incident" at the border between the Israeli-occupied Golan Heights and Lebanon. The incident involved Israeli soldiers and four Hezbollah fighters who allegedly crossed the border, and came days after a Hezbollah member was killed by Israeli airstrikes in Syria and an Israeli drone crashed in Lebanon. The Israel Defense Forces said that there were no Israeli casualties and that the four Hezbollah fighters fled back to Lebanon after being shot at. However, Hezbollah denied that their forces attacked the Israeli army, and said that their fighters had not crossed the border, stating that Israel opened fire first. Two dozen explosions were heard in Lebanon; an Israeli shell smashed in a civilian home, narrowly missing a family in their residence without injury.

=== Assassinations, cyberwarfare and sabotage ===
==== 2020 ====
The US assassinated Qasem Soleimani on 3 January, reversing policy of the prior administration which had warned Iran of Israeli attempts at assassinating Soleimani. The Iranians retaliated with Operation Martyr Soleimani, in which 11 Qiam 1 missiles hit Al-Asad Airbase, causing traumatic brain injuries to 110 American soldiers. On the same day, the IRGC mistakenly shot down Ukraine International Airlines Flight 752, killing all 176 passengers and crew aboard, including 82 Iranian citizens. This triggered another wave of Iranian anti-government protests (part of the larger 2019–2020 Iranian protests), with many Iranians calling for the removal of Supreme Leader Ali Khamenei. When giant U.S. and Israeli flags were painted on the ground for crowds of Iranian protestors to trample on them, according to video filmed at the scene that has been verified by NBC News, the crowds of people outside Beheshti University refused to trample over them.

On 9 May 2020, Israel was reportedly behind a cyberattack that disrupted the Shahid Rajaee port in the Strait of Hormuz, causing traffic jams of delivery trucks and delays in shipments. It was suggested that the attack was a response to a failed Iranian cyberattack on an Israeli water facility of the Sharon central region in April.

In June and July, a series of explosions targeted Iran's nuclear and missile programs and various other infrastructure. There were accidents and damages reported in the Parchin military complex near Tehran on 26 June, the Sina At'har clinic in Northern Tehran on 30 June, the Natanz nuclear facility on 2 July, the Shahid Medhaj power plant (Zargan) in Ahvaz and the Karun petrochemical center in the city of Mahshahr on 4 July. It has been speculated that Israel was involved, and the damage at the centrifuge plant in Natanz alone could delay the Iranian nuclear weapons program by one or two years, according to intelligence officials. On 6 July, another explosion occurred at the Sepahan Boresh factory in the city of Baqershahr. On 9 July, explosions were reported at a missile depot belonging to Iran's Revolutionary Guards Corps west of Tehran. On 11 July, an explosion took place at the basement of an old two-story house containing gas cylinders in northern Tehran. On 12 July, a fire broke out at the Shahid Tondgooyan Petrochemical Company in southwest Iran. On 13 July, an explosion occurred at a gas condensate plant of the Kavian Fariman industrial zone in the Razavi Khorasan province. On 15 July, a large fire broke out at a shipyard in the city of Bushehr, spreading to seven wooden boats. On 18 July, an oil pipeline exploded in the Ahvaz region in Southern Iran. On 19 July, another explosion took place in a power station in Isfahan. On 4 August, a massive explosion took place at the Beirut port caused by ammonium nitrate that was stored at the place. According to the German newspaper Die Welt, Iran supplied Hezbollah with hundreds of tons of ammonium nitrate between 2013 and 2014, while around that time Lebanon confiscated thousands of tons of the explosive substance that years later led to the blast.

Abdullah Ahmed Abdullah, the second-in-command of al-Qaeda, was killed on 7 August 2020 in Tehran.

Mohsen Fakhrizadeh, head of Iran's nuclear weapons program, was assassinated on 27 November 2020 in Absard.

==== Attacks on ships and incidents in 2021 ====
Israeli commandos carried out attacks which damaged numerous Iranian cargo ships carrying oil and weapons to Syria from late 2019 to 2021. Israeli-owned ships were attacked in the Gulf of Oman and the Arabian Sea, allegedly by Iran. Israel was also reportedly behind an attack on an Iranian intelligence ship of the Islamic Revolutionary Guard Corps Navy in the Red Sea, which was heavily damaged by a limpet mine in April 2021.

On 10 April 2021, Iran began injecting uranium hexafluoride gas into advanced IR-6 and IR-5 centrifuges at Natanz, but an accident occurred in the electricity distribution network the next day due to Mossad activity, according to Western and Iranian sources. On 13 April 2021, in what seemed to be an Iranian response, an Israeli-owned ship was attacked by a missile or a drone near the shores of the Fujairah emirate in the United Arab Emirates, causing light damage to the vessel. On 24 April, an Iranian fuel tanker was reportedly attacked off the Syrian coast by an Israeli drone, causing damage but no casualties.

On 7 May, a massive fire broke out in Iran's southwestern city of Bushehr near the only functioning nuclear power plant of the country. The IRGC-affiliated Tasnim News Agency reported that the fire was intentional, although its cause was unknown. On 9 May, an explosion occurred at an oil tanker off the coast of Syria, causing a small fire in one of its engines. On 23 May, at least nine people were injured in a blast at an Iranian plant that reportedly produces UAVs in Isfahan. The blast occurred after Prime Minister Netanyahu said a drone armed with explosives that was downed by Israeli forces earlier in the week was launched by Iran toward Israel from either Syria or Iraq, amid the fighting in Gaza. On 26 May, an explosion took place at a petrochemical complex in the city of Asaluyeh in Southern Iran, killing a worker and injuring two.

On 2 June, a fire broke out at an Iranian navy vessel, the IRIS Kharg, near the port of Jask in the Gulf of Oman, although the entire crew was able to safely disembark before the ship sank. Later in the day there was a gas leak at an oil refinery in Tehran which caused a massive fire. No injuries were reported. On 5 June, an explosion took place at the Zarand Iranian Steel Company in eastern Iran. No injuries were reported. On 20 June, it was reported that Iran's sole nuclear power plant at Bushehr underwent an emergency shutdown that would last between three and four days. On 23 June, a major damage was caused to one of the buildings of Iran's Atomic Energy Organization, although Iranian authorities denied there was any damage or casualties as a result of the sabotage attempt.

On 3 July, an Israeli-owned cargo ship was struck by an "unknown weapon" in the northern Indian Ocean, causing a fire to erupt onboard the vessel, although no injuries were reported. Israeli sources suspect that Iran was behind the attack. On 5 July, a large fire was reported at a warehouse or factory near the city of Karaj, where an alleged previous attack targeted a nuclear facility reportedly used to produce centrifuges. On 14 July, Iranian media reported an explosion at an office building in western Tehran, causing heavy damage to part of the building. On 29 July, an Israeli-operated oil tanker was attacked near the coast of Oman. According to senior Israeli officials, the attack was conducted by Iran.

On 10 August, a major explosion took place on a commercial ship docked at the Latakia port in Syria. Some reports identified the targeted ship as Iranian. The same day a fire broke out at an Iranian petrochemical factory on Khark Island in the Persian Gulf.

On 26 September, three people were injured in a fire at an IRGC research center west of Tehran.

On 26 October, a cyberattack crippled gas stations across Iran. It was reported that some hacked systems displayed messages addressing Iranian Supreme Leader Ali Khamenei, demanding to know "where is the gas."

On 7 November, it was reported that Mossad thwarted multiple Iranian attacks on Israelis in Tanzania, Senegal and Ghana. African authorities arrested five suspects. Iran has also attempted to strike Israel overseas and using cyberattacks.

==== Assassinations and covert bilateral attacks in 2022–2023 ====
In February 2022, an Israeli attack against an Iranian base destroyed hundrends of drones, which prompted Iran to fire missiles on an American consulate in Irbil (Iraqi Kurdistan) the following month. An Iranian cyberattack on Israeli websites was also reported.

In March 2022, Reuters reported that Israel was carrying out airstrikes against Iranian personnel and militias in Syria backed by Iran. The report said that Israel "seeks to prevent Iran from transferring weapons to Hezbollah".

On 22 May, Col. Hassan Sayyad Khodaei, a senior member of Iran's Islamic Revolutionary Guard Corps, was shot dead in his car in Tehran. He was among those responsible within the Guard's elite Quds Force for carrying out Iranian operations in Iraq and Syria. On 25 May, an engineer was killed and another employee was wounded during an incident at the Parchin military facility south of Tehran. Also in May, Israeli and Turkish security agencies foiled an Iranian plot to kidnap Israeli tourists in Turkey. Another plot was foiled in June following a Mossad rescue operation in Istanbul.

On 12 June, Argentinian authorities immobilized an Iranian Mahan Air cargo plane that was leased to a Venezuelan state-owned airline. The passports of five Iranian passengers traveling on the plane were confiscated, some of whom were purportedly linked to the IRGC. On 13 June, Mohammad Abdous, an Iranian Air Force scientist from the Aerospace Unit working on several projects, was killed during a mission at a base in northern Iran. The incident occurred less than 24 hours after Ali Kamani, another member of the air force's Aerospace Unit, died in a car accident in the city of Khomein. The New York Times reported that Iranian officials suspect Israel poisoned engineer Ayoob Entezari and geologist Kamran Aghamolaei. On 14 June, an explosion at a chemical factory in the southern city of Firouzabad injured over 100 Iranian workers, most of them lightly. On 15 June, another IRGC officer of the aerospace division, Wahab Premarzian, died in the city of Maragheh. On 19 June, an explosion was reported at an IRGC missile base in west Tehran. The site had been targeted last year as well. On 27 June, A large cyberattack forced the Iranian state-owned Khuzestan Steel Company to halt production, with two other major steel producers also being targeted. Israeli military correspondents hinted that Israel was responsible for the assault in retaliation for a suspected Iranian cyberattack that caused rocket sirens to be heard in Jerusalem and Eilat the previous week.

In July, IRGC engineer Said Thamardar Mutlak was killed in a suspected Mossad assassination in Shiraz, while Iranian state-media reported that a Mossad-linked spy network planning to carry out "unprecedented acts of sabotage and terrorist operations" in Iran was captured by IRGC intelligence.

On 22 August, IRGC Brigadier General Abolfazal Alijani was killed in the Aleppo region of Syria.

On 1 September, an explosion occurred at a key oil refinery in Abadan that supplies 25% of Iran's fuel needs. No injuries were reported.

On 15 November, an oil tanker owned by an Israeli billionaire was attacked off the coast of Oman by an Iranian drone belonging to the IRGC, causing damage but no injuries. The same day security services in Georgia announced they foiled an Iranian plot to assassinate an Israeli businessman in that country, which was supposed to have been carried out by a Pakistani hit squad hired by Iran and assisted by the IRGC. On 23 November, Iran blamed Israel for the death of a senior adviser of the IRGC's aerospace division who was killed by a roadside bomb near Damascus.

On 28 January 2023, a series of bomb-carrying drones attacked an Iranian defense factory in Isfahan, causing material damage at the plant, while a fire broke out at a refinery in the country's northwest the same day. According to The Wall Street Journal, Israel was responsible for the strike.

On 17 February, the IRGC launched a drone attack against an Israeli-owned vessel in the Persian Gulf, causing minor damage. In March, Greek authorities—with help from Mossad—arrested two foreigners that were part of an Iranian cell looking to attack Jews and Israelis in that country.

In April, Shin Bet announced the arrest of two Palestinians in the West Bank who were recruited by Hezbollah and the Iranian Quds Force to carry out attacks on their behalf.

In June, a planned attack by IRGC members against Jews and Israelis in Cyprus was foiled by Cypriot intelligence services in cooperation with US and Israeli agencies.

In September, a suspected explosion struck an Iranian missile base in the city of Khorramabad, with some observers suggesting it was a Mossad operation. On 27 September, Shin Bet arrested a five-person cell, consisting of three Palestinians and two Israeli citizens, that security officials claimed was an Iranian-led cell gathering intelligence to assassinate far-right Israeli minister Itamar Ben-Gvir and far-right activist Yehuda Glick. On 28 September, a fire broke out at a car battery factory owned by the Iranian Defense Ministry for the second time in less than a week.

In 2024, former Iranian president Mahmoud Ahmadinejad said that Iran's intelligence service created a unit to counter Mossad operations, but its leader was later revealed to be a Mossad agent himself. He further added that around 20 Iranian operatives had been supplying intelligence to Israel, serving as double agents.

=== During the Gaza war ===
The Gaza war between Israel and Palestinian militant groups led by Hamas (Note: The list of groups included Hamas, Islamic Jihad, Popular Front for the Liberation of Palestine, Democratic Front for the Liberation of Palestine and the Lions' Den.) began on 7 October 2023, with a coordinated surprise offensive on Israel. The attack began with a rocket barrage of at least 3,000 rockets launched from the Hamas-controlled Gaza Strip against Israel. In parallel, approximately 2,500 Palestinian militants breached the Gaza–Israel barrier, attacking military bases and massacring civilians in neighboring Israeli communities. At least 1,200 people were killed, including 360 at a music festival. Unarmed civilian hostages and captured Israeli soldiers were taken to the Gaza Strip, including women and children. The surprise Palestinian attack was met with Israeli retaliatory strikes, and Israel formally declared war on Hamas and its allies a day later.

Iran, which reportedly assisted Hamas with planning the attack, threatened Israel to immediately stop the war on Gaza. A conflict was reported between militants in Lebanon, including Hezbollah, and Israeli forces on 8 and 9 October.

Iran and its proxies, Russia and to a lesser extent China have launched a disinformation campaign against Israel, Ukraine – which condemned the attacks – and their main ally, the United States. The Institute for Strategic Dialogue's report singled out Iranian accounts on Facebook and X that glorified the crimes of Hamas and encouraged more violence against Israeli civilians. Researchers have documented at least 40,000 bots or fake social media accounts, as well as strategic use of state-controlled media outlets like RT, Sputnik and Tasnim. Iran also accused Israel and the United States of committing war crimes in Gaza.

Amidst the war, the Houthi insurgent group extended the conflict's reach by launching missile attacks directed towards Israeli territory.

In December, two Iranian suspects linked to the IRGC were arrested in Cyprus for planning to target Israelis there. On 16 December, Iran reportedly executed a spy working for the Mossad in Sistan and Baluchestan province. On 18 December, Iranian media reported disruptions at 60% of gas stations across the country after a cyberattack by the hacktivist group Predatory Sparrow. On 23 December, a drone reportedly from Iran struck an Israeli-affiliated, Liberian-flagged chemical products tanker identified by Asian News International as MV Chem Pluto in the Arabian Sea, 200 nautical miles (370 km) southwest of the coast of Veraval, India. The attack caused a fire on board, but there were no injuries reported. The tanker, which was carrying crude oil, had a crew of 20 Indians, and came from a port in Saudi Arabia. The Indian Navy responded to the incident, and sent ICGS Vikram to the tanker.

On 25 December, Sayyed Razi Mousavi, a top commander and senior adviser of the IRGC, was killed by an Israeli airstrike in the Sayyida Zeinab area. On 28 December, eleven leaders of the IRGC were killed in an airstrike targeting the Damascus International Airport, according to Saudi media. It was reported that the IRGC commanders were meeting high-ranking delegates at the time of the strike. On 29 December, Iran executed four people for allegedly spying for the Mossad, and arrested several others. On 20 January 2024, an airstrike killed five elite Iranian Revolutionary Guards in a building in Damascus. Iran blamed Israel. On 29 January, Iran executed four people who were accused of planning to carry out a bomb plot ordered by Mossad against a factory producing military equipment. In February, it was reported that the IRGC has recruited British Shia Muslims visiting religious sites in Iran and Iraq to spy or carry out attacks on Jews and Iranian dissidents living in the UK. On 14 February, explosions struck a natural gas pipeline in Iran, with an official blaming "sabotage and terrorist action".

On 1 April 2024, the Iranian consulate annex building adjacent to the Iranian embassy in Damascus, Syria, was struck by an Israeli airstrike, killing 16 people, including Brigadier General Mohammad Reza Zahedi, a senior Quds Force commander of the Islamic Revolutionary Guard Corps (IRGC), and seven other IRGC officers. On 13 April, Iran retaliated against the attack with missile and drone strikes in Israel. On 19 April, Israel launched a series of retaliatory missile strikes on Iranian military sites. Iranian officials have also reported explosions at military sites in Syria and Iraq. Iran is the third-largest producer in oil cartel OPEC, so there was concern about rising oil prices.

It was reported in the end of April that Israel killed an IRGC operative in Tehran who was allegedly involved in targeting Jews in Germany.

In May 2024, reports emerged detailing Iran's alleged orchestration of terror attacks targeting Israeli embassies in Europe, facilitated by local criminal networks. The Swedish Security Service verified Iran's involvement in these security-threatening activities aimed at Israeli and Jewish establishments in Sweden. Subsequently, Swedish authorities reinforced security protocols at these sites.

On the night between 30 July and 31 July, two senior figures of Iranian backed proxy groups were killed in assassinations attributed to Israel by Iran.

On 14 August, several Iranian banks, including the Central Bank, were targeted as part of a significant cyberattack that led to widespread disruptions in the Iranian banking system. It was described as one of the largest-ever cyberattacks against Iran's state infrastructure.

On 25 August, Islamic Resistance in Iraq said that they fired a drone strike to Haifa.

On 27 August, Islamic Resistance in Iraq claimed that their drone strike struck a "vital target" in Haifa.

In September, a couple was detained and charged by a Paris court for their involvement in an Iranian plot to kill Israelis and Jews in Germany and France. Iran has been accused of recruiting criminals, including drug lords, to conduct such operations on European soil.

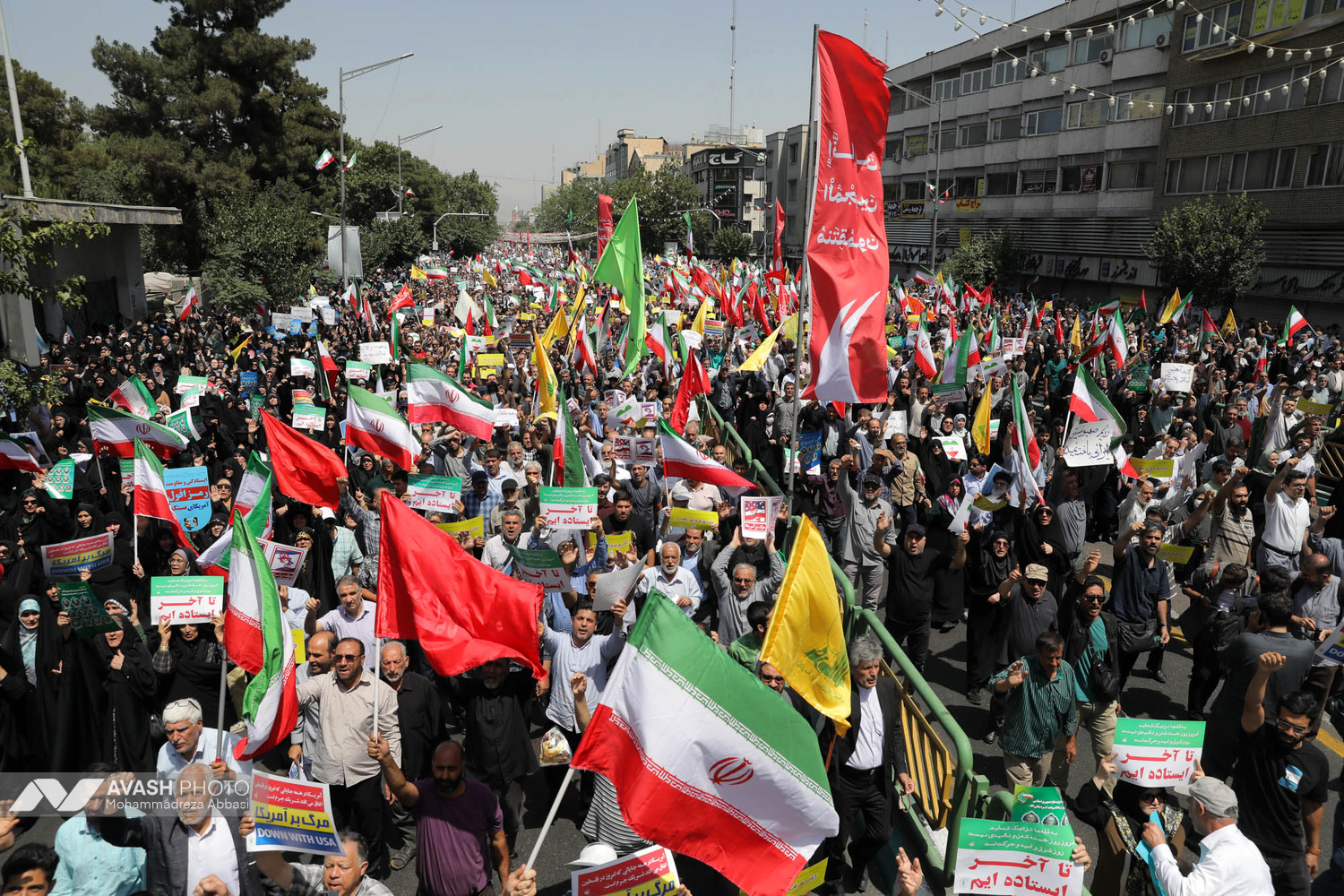
Protest in Tehran against Israeli strikes on Iran, 20 June 2025

On 8 September, Israeli commandos raided an underground facility near Masyaf used by Iran and Hezbollah to build precision-guided missiles.

On 17 September, the Shin Bet claimed that it thwarted a Hezbollah attempt to assassinate a former senior defence official with a claymore mine. At least 11 people were killed and 4,000 were wounded, mostly Hezbollah members, after the explosions of their pagers nationwide, including in Beirut. Among those reported injured was the Iranian ambassador, Mojtaba Amani.

On 19 October 2024, a drone strike reportedly targeted Israeli PM Benjamin Netanyahu's residence, but no injuries were reported as neither he nor his wife was present at the time. Netanyahu remarked, "the proxies of Iran who today tried to assassinate me and my wife made a bitter mistake." Iran has attributed the reported attack to Hezbollah, with the state-run IRNA news agency quoting Iran's mission to the UN saying: "The action in question has been carried out by Hezbollah in Lebanon."

=== Cyberwarfare and intelligence activity (2025–2026) ===
In February 2026, Israel's Shin Bet and National Cyber Directorate reported foiling hundreds of cyberattack attempts attributed to Iranian intelligence over the prior year. These mainly involved targeted phishing and account takeovers against senior government officials, defense figures, academics, journalists, and others, with increased activity since the June 2025 Israel–Iran war. Israeli authorities stated that most attempts were thwarted, with no major successful breaches reported.

In June 2026, Yossi Karadi, director general of Israel's National Cyber Directorate, said that cyberattacks attributed to Iran had risen from around 1,600 incidents during June 2025 to about 4,800 during the same month in 2026. He said the attacks targeted critical infrastructure, central organisations, small and medium-sized businesses, and the public. Karadi said that attacks on critical infrastructure had been repelled, although some companies had their computer systems wiped. Also in June, Iran's state-owned banking technology provider said that cyberattacks had disrupted card-based banking services at Bank Melli, Bank Saderat and Bank Tejarat, prompting a temporary suspension of all card-related operations. Iranian authorities did not identify a suspected perpetrator, but said they had previously blamed similar incidents on hostile foreign actors such as Israel. Israel did not comment on the allegations.

== Iranian supporters and alleged proxies ==
=== Syria ===
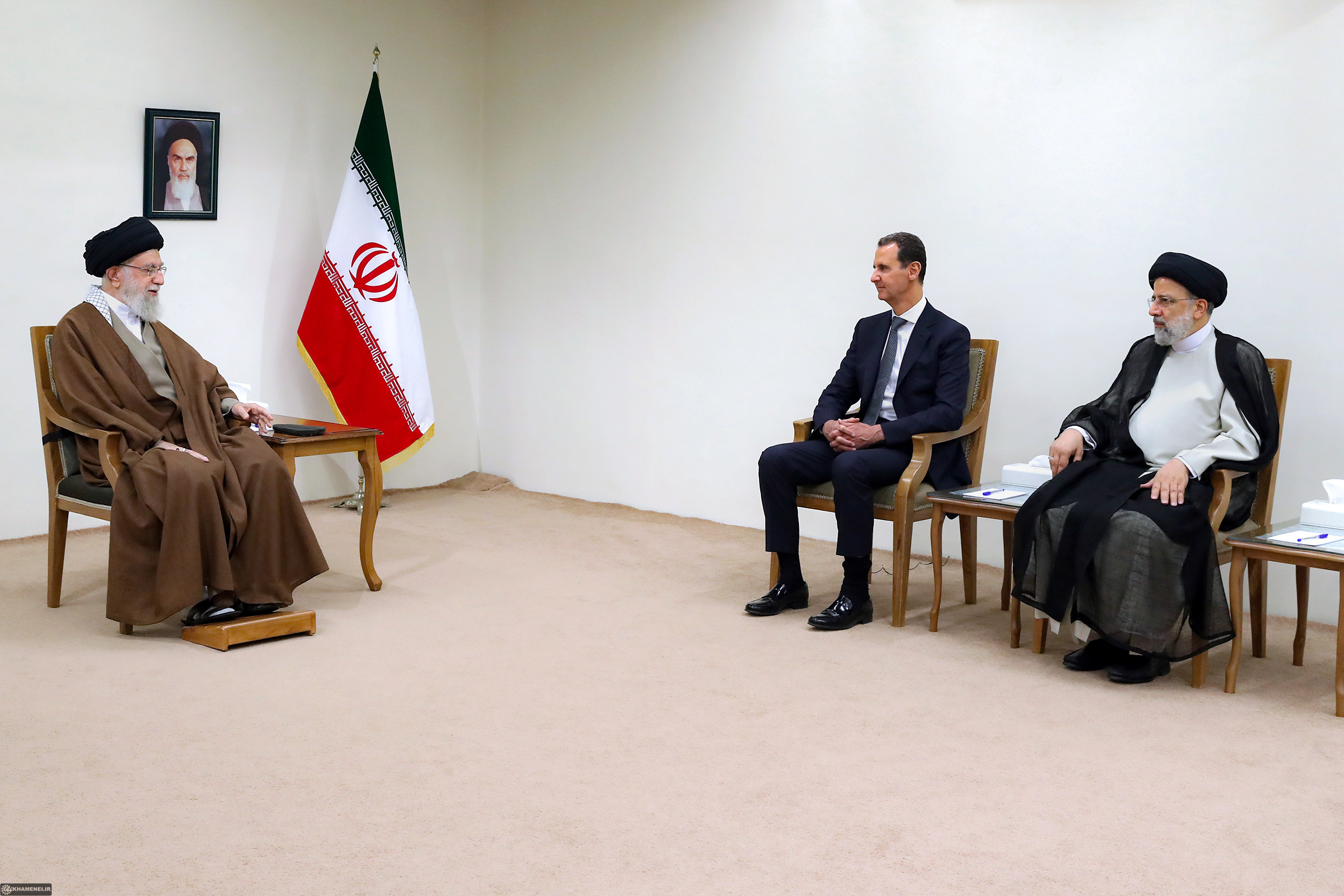
Iran's supreme leader Ayatollah Ali Khamenei and President Ebrahim Raisi meeting with Syrian president Bashar al-Assad on 8 May 2022

Iran and Ba'athist Syria were close strategic allies, and Iran had provided significant support for the Bashar al-Assad's government in the Syrian Civil War, including logistical, technical and financial support, as well as training and some combat troops. Iran saw the survival of the Syrian government as being crucial to its regional interests, however the regime collapsed after a rebel offensive in December 2024. The Iranian government downplayed the extent of its strategic loss, although Brig. Gen. IRGC Commander Behrouz Esbati admitted that Iran was "defeated very badly". The Supreme Leader of Iran, Ali Khamenei, was reported in September 2011 to be vocally in favor of the Syrian government. When the uprising developed into the Syrian Civil War, there were increasing reports of Iranian military support, and of Iranian training of National Defence Forces (NDF) both in Syria and Iran.

Iranian security and intelligence services were advising and assisting the Syrian military in order to preserve Assad's hold on power. Those efforts include training, technical support, and combat troops. Thousands of Iranian operatives – as many as 10,000 by the end of 2013 – have fought in the Syrian civil war on the pro-government side, including regular troops and militia members. In 2018, Tehran said that 2,100 Iranian soldiers have been killed in Syria and Iraq over the past seven years. Iran has also sponsored and facilitated the involvement of Shia militias from across the region to fight in Syria, including Lebanese Hezbollah, Afghan Liwa Fatemiyoun, Pakistani Liwa Zainebiyoun, Iraqi Harakat al-Nujaba, Kataib Seyyed al-Shuhada and Kataib Hezbollah, and Bahraini Saraya Al-Mukhtar.

=== Hezbollah ===
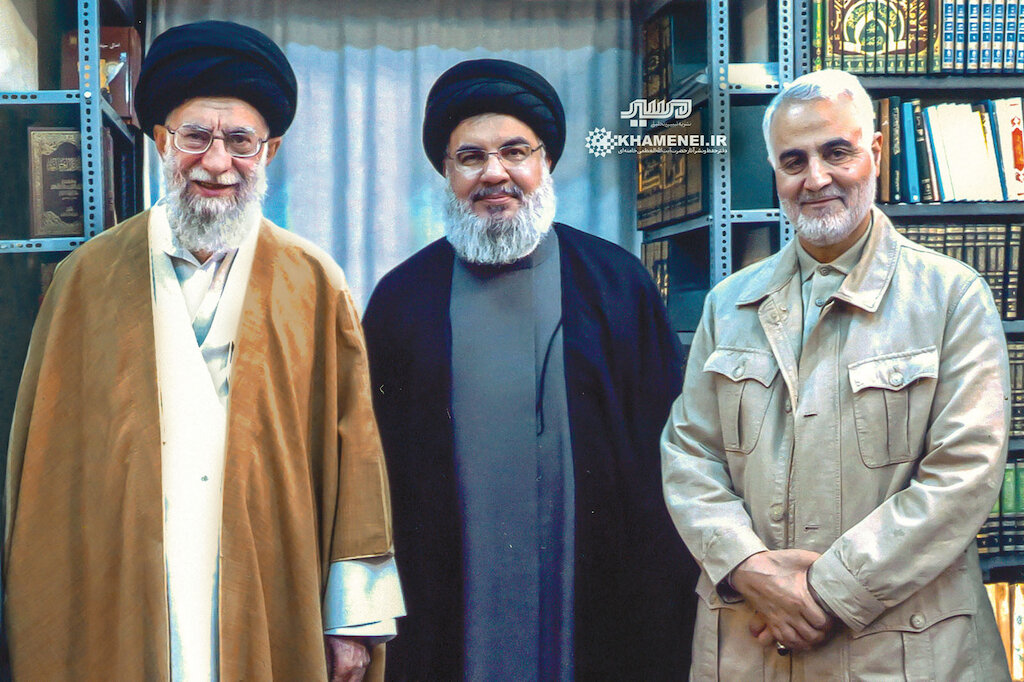
Hezbollah leader Hassan Nasrallah with Ali Khamenei on the left and Quds Force commander Qasem Soleimani on the right

Hezbollah was established as a hybrid organization, with political and social components aimed at gaining legitimacy. Similar to Iran's bonyads, Hezbollah set up an extensive welfare network for the Shiite in poverty. The group provided discounted or free medical care, education, and cultural events.

Hezbollah has grown to an organization with seats in the Lebanese government, a radio and a satellite television-station, programs for social development and large-scale military deployment of fighters beyond Lebanon's borders. The organization has been called a "state within a state". Hezbollah is part of the March 8 Alliance within Lebanon, in opposition to the March 14 Alliance. Hezbollah maintains strong support among Lebanon's Shi'a population, while Sunnis have disagreed with the group's agenda. Following the end of the Israeli occupation of South Lebanon in 2000, its military strength grew significantly, such that its paramilitary wing is considered more powerful than the Lebanese Army. Iran has supported Hezbollah since its founding in 1982, Hezbollah was the first significant proxy nurtured by the Islamic republic as part of Iran's "strategy of confronting Israel on multiple fronts". Hezbollah receives military training, weapons, and financial support from Iran, and political support from Syria. Hezbollah also fought against Israel in the 2006 Lebanon War.

Hezbollah has been a major combatant in the Syrian Civil War, helping to ensure the survival of the Iran-backed Assad government. Active support and troop deployment began in 2012, steadily increasing thereafter. Hezbollah deployed several thousand fighters in Syria and by 2015 lost up to 1,500 fighters in combat. Hezbollah has also been very active to prevent rebel penetration from Syria to Lebanon, being one of the most active forces in the Syrian Civil War spillover in Lebanon. By March 2019, 1,677 Lebanese Hezbollah fighters had reportedly been killed in Syria.

Lina Khatib, director of the SOAS Middle East Institute in London, said in an interview with the Associated Press "Iran’s support has helped Hezbollah consolidate its position as Lebanon’s most powerful political actor as well as the most equipped military actor supported by Iran in the whole of the Middle East".

=== Hamas (2005–2011) ===
Iran has backed Hamas since the 1990's. The Washington Institute details that during the second intifada, the IRGC, Quads force and Hezbollah cooperated closely with Hamas. the integration positioned Hamas as a strategic arm within Iran's "Axis of resistance", operating closely with other Iranian proxies. Between 2005 and 2011, Iran was one of the main funders and suppliers of Hamas. Israel estimates the Hamas' Brigades have a core of several hundred members, who received military training, including training in Iran and in Syria (before the Syrian Civil War). In 2011, after the outbreak of the Syrian Civil War, Hamas distanced itself from the Syrian government and its members began leaving Syria. In a speech for the spokesman of the Qassam brigades in 2014 on Hamas's 27 anniversary he thanked Iran for aid in finance and weapons.

=== Sudan (2005–2015) ===
In 2008, Sudan and Iran signed a military cooperation agreement. The agreement was signed by Iran's Defense Minister Mostafa Mohammad-Najjar and his Sudanese counterpart Abdelrahim Mohamed Hussein.

In 2011, however, Sudan reduced its cooperation with Iran after the start of the Syrian Civil War.

In 2015, Sudan completely severed its ties with Iran, by participating in the Saudi-led intervention in the Yemeni Crisis on behalf of the Sunni Arab alliance.

=== Palestinian Islamic Jihad ===
Iran is a major financial supporter of the Islamic Jihad Movement in Palestine (PIJ). Following the Israeli and Egyptian squeeze on Hamas in early 2014, PIJ has seen its power steadily increase with the backing of funds from Iran. Its financial backing is believed to also come from Syria.

=== Iraq ===
The 2003 invasion of Iraq unintentionally allowed Iran to strengthen its influence by gaining political influence and establishing loyal militias within Iraq. Asa'ib Ahl al-Haq and Harakat Hezbollah al-Nujaba are militias in Iraq backed by Iran.

=== Yemen ===
Iran has supplied weapons to the Shia Houthi movement in Yemen known as "Ansar Allah". Houthis control of Al Hudaydah's port and Sanaa solved the Quds Force's logistics for delivering weapons into Yemen. By 2012, the IRGC's Weapons Transfer Unit (Unit 190), under the leadership of Brigadier Generals Behnam Shahariyari and Sayyed Jabar Hosseini, began seeking methods to smuggle weapons into Yemen. The IRGC set up an "air bridge," initially operating two flights per day. Later, an Iranian fleet began transporting military supplies to the Hudaydah Port.

=== Harakat Ashab al-Yamin al-Islamia ===
Harakat Ashab al-Yamin al-Islamia (Arabic: حركة أصحاب اليمين الإسلامية, lit. 'Islamic Movement of the People of the Right Hand'), commonly known as Ashab al-Yamin or HAYI, is a pro-Iranian Islamist group that has taken credit for attacks against Jewish schools, synagogues and charities in Europe, as well as American, Israeli and Iranian opposition targets, since March 2026. The group's activities have primarily focused on attacks on London's Jewish community, with additional attacks across Europe. The group is believed to be a front group for the Islamic Revolutionary Guard Corps. Analysts have questioned the group's authenticity and posited it may be a fictitious group created by Iran to take credit for attacks orchestrated by Iranian intelligence or for outsourcing actions commercially.

== Israeli supporters and alleged proxies ==
=== United States ===
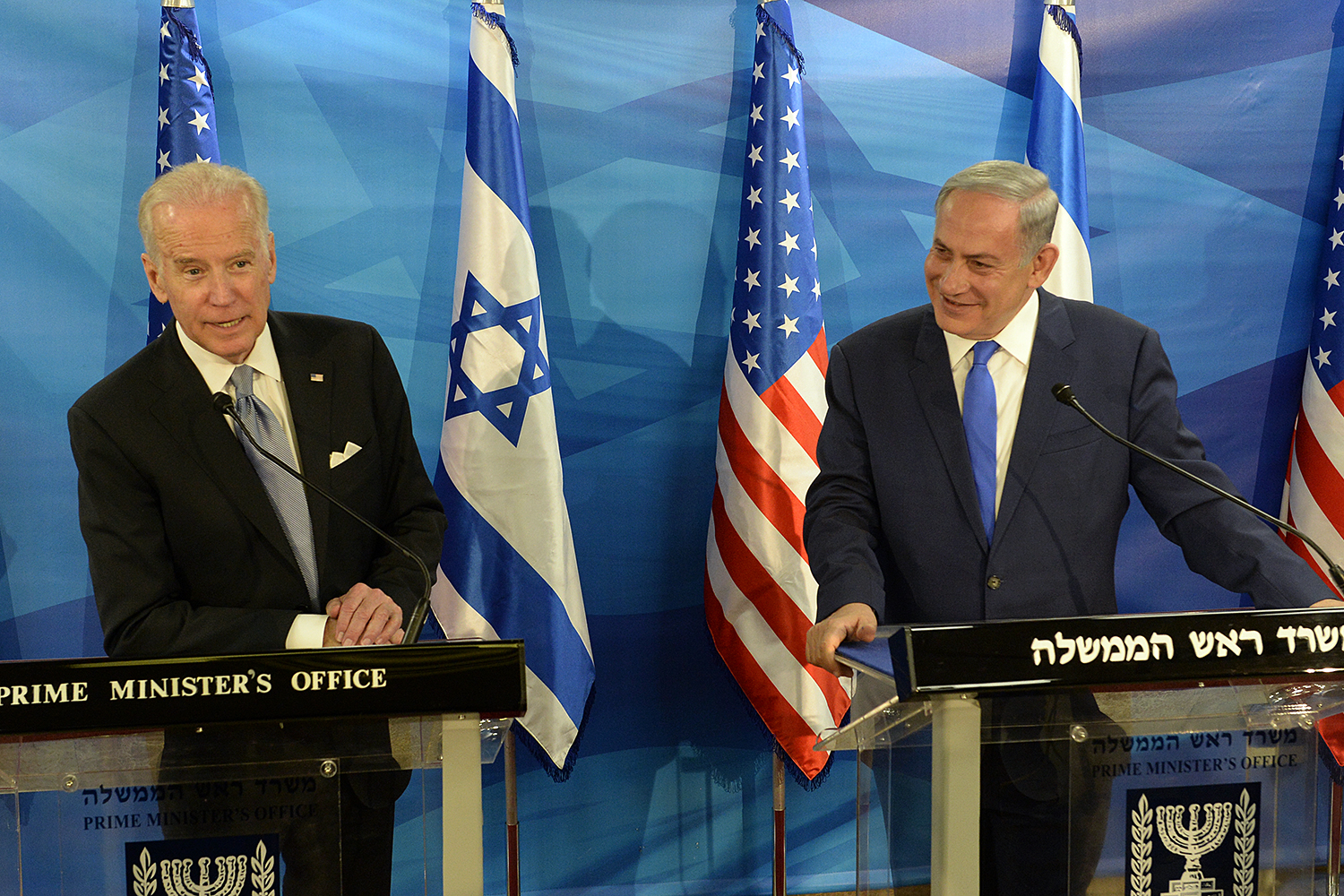
Vice President Joe Biden with Israeli prime minister Benjamin Netanyahu in Jerusalem in 2016

Israel's closest military ally, the United States, has a long history of violence against Iran, including the August 1953 overthrow of the Mossadegh government by U.S. and U.K. covert operatives, and the decades long U.S. support for the authoritarian rule of the Shah. The U.S. provided major military and other support to Saddam Hussein's Iraq for decades after Iraq attacked Iran, and in 1988, the United States launched Operation Praying Mantis against Iran, the largest American naval combat operation since World War II. The United States has military bases that virtually encircle Iran.

On 22 June 2025, the United States Air Force and Navy attacked three nuclear facilities in Iran as part of the Twelve-Day War.

=== Saudi Arabia ===
While Iran is the world's main Shia Muslim-led country, Saudi Arabia is considered a leading Sunni Muslim nation. In what has been described as a cold war, the Iran–Saudi Arabia proxy conflict, waged on multiple levels over geopolitical, economic, and sectarian influence in pursuit of regional hegemony, has been a major feature of Western Asia since 1979. American support for Saudi Arabia and its allies as well as Russian and Chinese support for Iran and its allies have drawn comparisons to the dynamics of the Cold War era, and the proxy conflict has been characterized as a front in what Russian prime minister Dmitry Medvedev has referred to as the "New Cold War". The rivalry today is primarily a political and economic struggle exacerbated by religious differences, and sectarianism in the region is exploited by both countries for geopolitical purposes as part of the conflict.

Israel and Saudi Arabia do not have any official diplomatic relations. However, news reports have indicated extensive behind-the-scenes diplomatic and intelligence cooperation between the countries, in pursuit of mutual goals against regional enemy Iran.

The Gaza war had a significant impact on diplomatic efforts. Speculation arose that Iran was trying to sabotage relations between Israel and Saudi Arabia, with former head of research for Shin Bet Neomi Neumann saying the attack could have been timed in part due to Iran's hopes to scuttle efforts to normalize relations between Israel and its Sunni rival. On 9 October, Iranian Foreign Ministry spokesperson Nasser Kanaani denied claims of Tehran's involvement in Hamas's attack. On 12 October, Saudi Crown Prince Mohammed bin Salman discussed the Israel-Gaza situation with Iranian president Ebrahim Raisi. On 13 October, Saudi Arabia criticized Israel for the displacement of Palestinians from Gaza and the attacks on civilians. On 14 October, Saudi Arabia suspended talks on the possible normalization of relations with Israel.

=== Azerbaijan ===
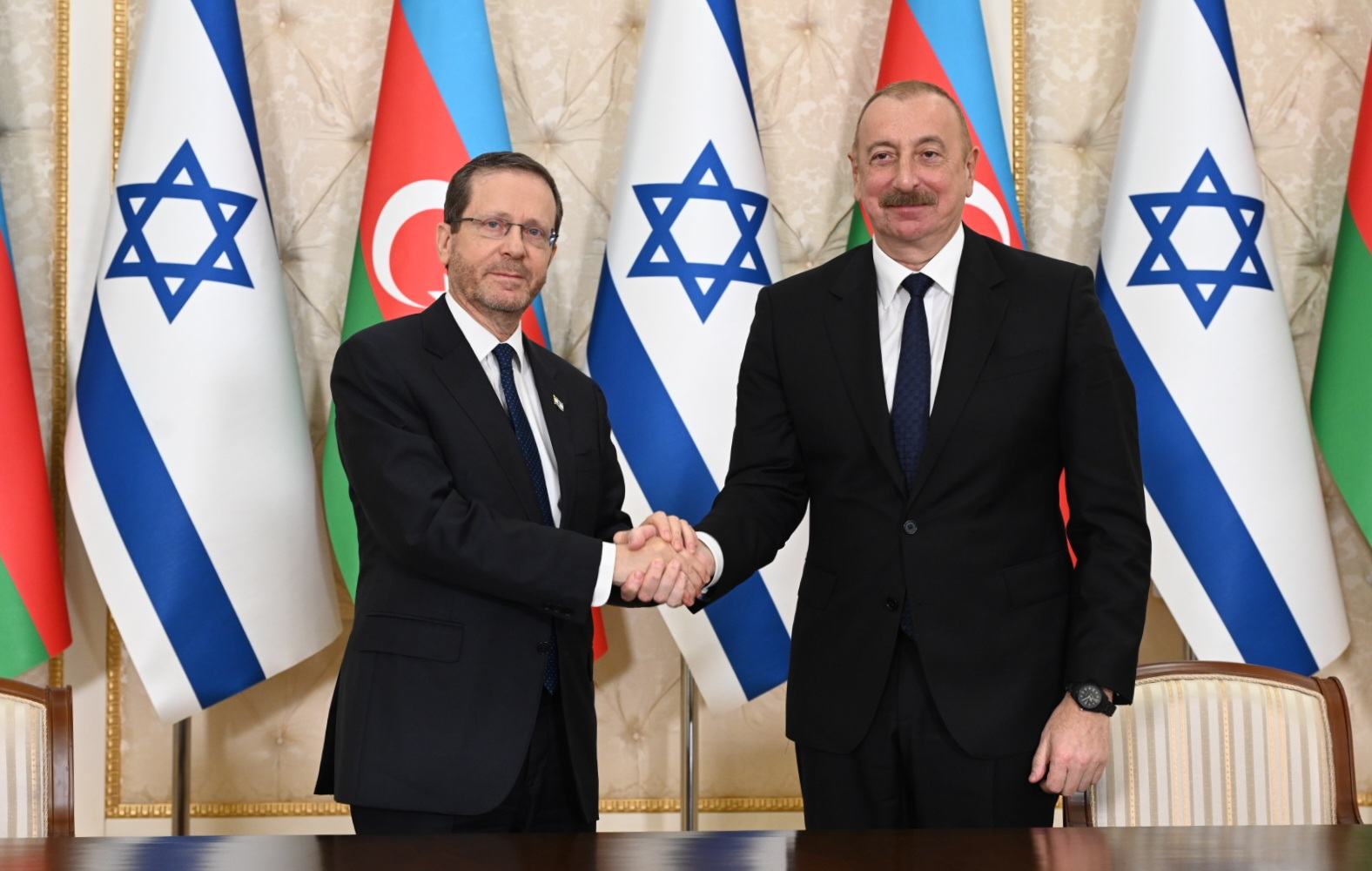
Azerbaijan's president Ilham Aliyev and Israeli president Isaac Herzog in Baku, May 2023

=== Militant groups ===
Following the escalation of clashes between Israel and Iran, the Kurdistan Freedom Party declared its support for the Israeli strikes on Iran and called for an uprising. Other non-state actors opposed to the Iranian government have also been linked to developments related to Israel’s confrontation with Iran. The People's Mojahedin Organization of Iran has been reported in some media and intelligence accounts to have had alleged links to Israeli intelligence operations targeting Iranian nuclear scientists, including claims of training, funding, and operational support.

== Notable wars and violent events ==
Time	Name	Deaths	Result
1985–2000	South Lebanon conflict	559 Israelis 621 soldiers of the South Lebanon Army 1,276 Hezbollah soldiers	Hezbollah victory Israeli withdrawal from southern Lebanon
2000–2006	2000–2006 Shebaa Farms conflict	25 Israelis 16 Hezbollah soldiers	Inconclusive, Israel retains control over Shebaa Farms, Beginning of the 2006 Lebanon War
2006	2006 Lebanon War	165 Israelis; 1,954 Lebanese	Stalemate, both sides claim victory
2008–2009	First Gaza War	14 Israelis; 1,434 Palestinians	Israeli victory
2012	Operation Pillar of Defense	6 Israelis; 158 Palestinians	Both sides claim victory
2013–ongoing	Iran–Israel conflict during the Syrian civil war	631+ Syrian and Iranian soldiers	Ongoing
2014	2014 Gaza War	73 Israelis; 2,251 Palestinians	Both sides claim victory
2021	2021 Israel–Palestine crisis	13 Israelis; 274 Palestinians	Both sides claim victory
2023–present	Gaza war	1,450+ Israelis; 32,000+ Palestinians	Ongoing
2023–present	Israel–Hezbollah conflict	21+ Israelis; 300+ Lebanese; 30+ Palestinians; 50+ Syrians	Ongoing
2024	2024 Iran–Israel conflict	16 Iranian and proxy	Inconclusive
2025	Twelve-Day War		Ceasefire
2026	2026 Iran War		Ongoing

=== Assassination of Iranian nuclear scientists ===
In 2010, a wave of assassinations targeting Iranian nuclear scientists began. The assassinations were widely believed to be the work of Mossad, Israel's foreign intelligence service. According to Iran and global media sources, the methods used to kill the scientists is reminiscent of the way Mossad had previously assassinated targets. The assassinations were alleged to be an attempt to stop Iran's nuclear program, or to ensure that it cannot recover following a strike on Iranian nuclear facilities. In the first attack, particle physicist Masoud Alimohammadi was killed on 12 January 2010 when a booby-trapped motorcycle parked near his car exploded. On 12 October 2010, an explosion occurred at an IRGC military base near the city of Khorramabad, killing 18 soldiers. On 29 November 2010, two senior Iranian nuclear scientists, Majid Shahriari and Fereydoon Abbasi, were targeted by hitmen on motorcycles, who attached bombs to their cars and detonated them from a distance. Shahriari was killed, while Abbasi was severely wounded. On 23 July 2011, Darioush Rezaeinejad was shot dead in eastern Tehran. On 11 January 2012, Mostafa Ahmadi Roshan and his driver were killed by a bomb attached to their car from a motorcycle.

Iran blamed Israel and the U.S. for the assassinations. Iranian officials also blamed British intelligence agencies. Mahmoud Alavi, Iran's intelligence minister, said the person who planned the killing was "a member of the armed forces" indirectly suggesting that the perpetrator might have been from the Islamic Revolutionary Guard Corps (IRGC). In 2014 NBC reported that two US officials said the MEK had received finance and training from Israel in killing nuclear scientists, while a senior State Department official later said they never claimed the MEK was involved in the assassinations of Iranian nuclear scientists. In early 2011, Majid Jamali Fashi confessed to the killing of Masoud Alimohammadi on Iranian state television, saying that he had trained for the operation at a Mossad facility near Tel Aviv. Fashi was executed in May 2012. That month, Iranian authorities announced the arrest of another 14 Iranians – eight men and six women – described as an Israeli-trained terror cell responsible for five of the attacks on Iranian scientists. Iran's IRTV Channel 1 broadcast a half-hour documentary, Terror Club, which included "the televised confessions of the 12 suspects allegedly involved in the killings of Ali-Mohammadi, Shahriari, Rezaeinejad, and Roshan, and the attempted killing of Abbasi."

=== Gaza war ===
The Gaza war began in October 2023. Although it did not have direct Iranian involvement, the war has reverberated regionally, with "Axis of Resistance" groups across several Arab countries and Iran clashing with the US and Israel, including the Twelve-Day War in 2025, and the 2026 Iran war. A year of strikes between Israel and Hezbollah led to wars in Lebanon in 2024 and in 2026, as well as ongoing Israeli operations in Syria, which contributed to the fall of the Assad regime. The war continues to have regional and international repercussions, with large protests worldwide as well as a surge of antisemitism and anti-Palestinian racism. Within this, the Red Sea crisis اs an ongoing armed conflict and maritime crisis instigated by the Houthis, an armed group in Yemen. The Houthis began launching missiles and armed drones at Israel in response to the Gaza war] and have seized or attacked dozens of merchant and naval vessels travelling through the Red Sea which they claimed are linked to Israel. These actions provoked a military response from Israel, as well as the United States and the United Kingdom. The crisis has included the Galaxy Leader hijacking, and Israeli attacks on Yemen in September 2024, December 2024, and 2025.

=== 2024 conflict ===
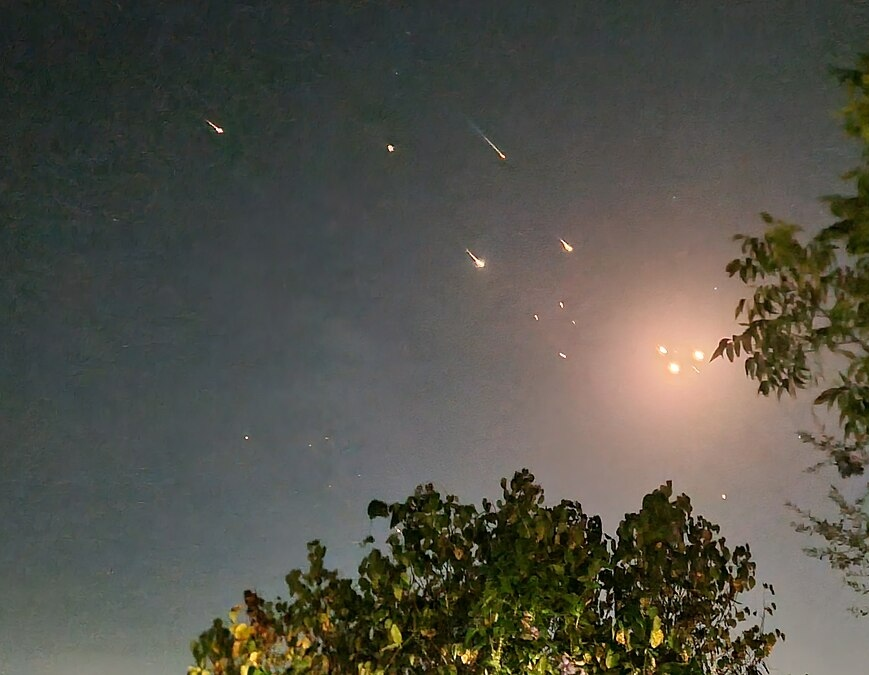
Missile interceptions in during the October 2024 Iranian attack on Israel

In 2024, the proxy war escalated to a series of direct confrontations between the two countries. On 1 April, Israel bombed an Iranian consulate complex in Damascus, Syria, killing multiple senior Iranian officials. In response, Iran and its Axis of Resistance allies seized the Israeli-linked ship MSC Aries and launched strikes inside Israel on 13 April. Israel then carried out retaliatory strikes in Iran and Syria on 19 April. The Israeli strikes were limited, and analysts say they signaled a desire to de-escalate. Iran did not respond to the attack, and tensions de-escalated back down to the proxy war.

=== 2025 Twelve-Day War ===
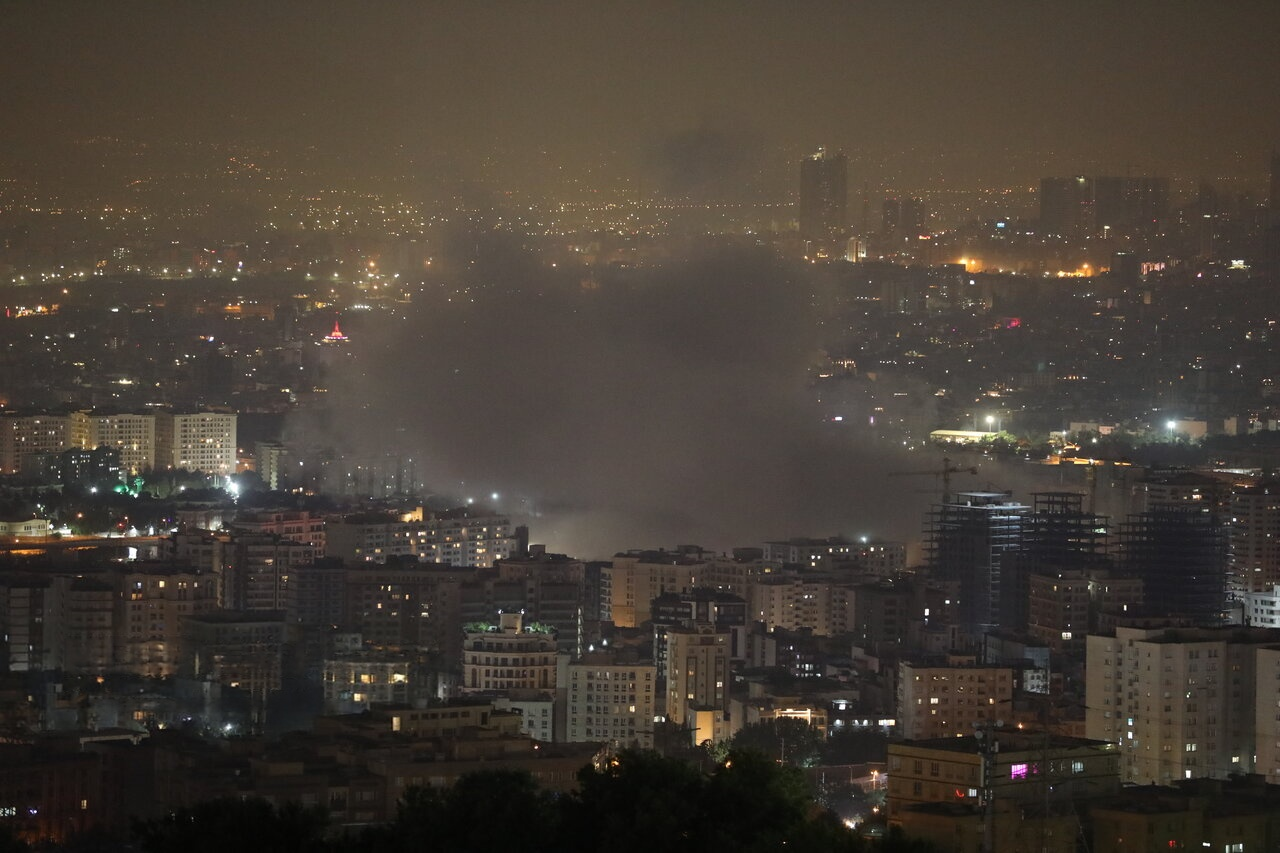
Aerial view of Tehran following Israeli airstrikes, 13 June 2025

On 13 June 2025, the conflict escalated further into an armed conflict between Iran and the Houthis against Israel and the United States, when Israel launched a surprise attack targeting key Iranian military and nuclear facilities. The opening hours of the war saw targeted assassinations and attempted assassinations of Iran's top military leaders, nuclear scientists, and politicians (including Ali Shamkhani, who was overseeing nuclear talks with the United States), airstrikes on nuclear and military facilities, and destruction of Iran's air defenses. Iran retaliated by launching missiles at military sites and cities in Israel. The United States, which had been defending Israel since the beginning of the war by shooting down Iranian missiles and drones, took offensive action on 22 June 2025, by striking three Iranian nuclear sites. In response, the Houthis in Yemen considered the American strikes a "declaration of war" and have fired several missiles at Israel. The New York Times, France24 and other news outlets expressed how Iranian proxy militias stayed largely silent and left Iran "isolated in war" during the 2025 war with Israel. The war concluded with a ceasefire.

=== Post-2025 Twelve-Day War ===
Following Israeli military operations during the Twelve-Day War that resulted in the deaths of key Iranian military figures, including senior members of the Islamic Revolutionary Guard Corps (IRGC), Iran has continued to support allied groups across the Middle East. According to the United States Central Command, the Iranian Revolutionary Guard has supplied weapons, including drones and missiles, to groups such as Hezbollah in Lebanon, the Houthis in Yemen, and Shiite militias in Iraq. In Yemen, US authorities reported intercepting a vessel carrying 750 tons of Iranian weapons, including drone engines and radar systems, allegedly destined for the Houthis. In Iraq, the Kurdish Regional Government (KRG) accused suspected Iranian-backed militias of carrying out drone attacks on oil infrastructure, including facilities operated by US companies. In Syria, the Syrian Interior Ministry and Syrian police reported intercepting multiple weapons shipments allegedly bound for Hezbollah, including anti-tank missiles hidden in commercial trucks. These developments have occurred as nuclear negotiations between Iran and the United States remain stalled.

=== 2026 Iran War ===
On 28 February 2026, Israel and the United States launched a surprise attack targeting key Iranian military personnel, while Iran targeted numerous military bases in response.

During that war, antisemitic incidents increased worldwide. Many of the incidents, including the a wave of attacks in London in March–April 2026, were claimed by Harakat Ashab al-Yamin al-Islamia, which is believed to be a front group for Iran's Islamic Revolutionary Guard Corps, who had outsourced the acts to local criminals and used the group to create plausible deniability, as a form of hybrid warfare.

== International responses ==
=== Russia ===
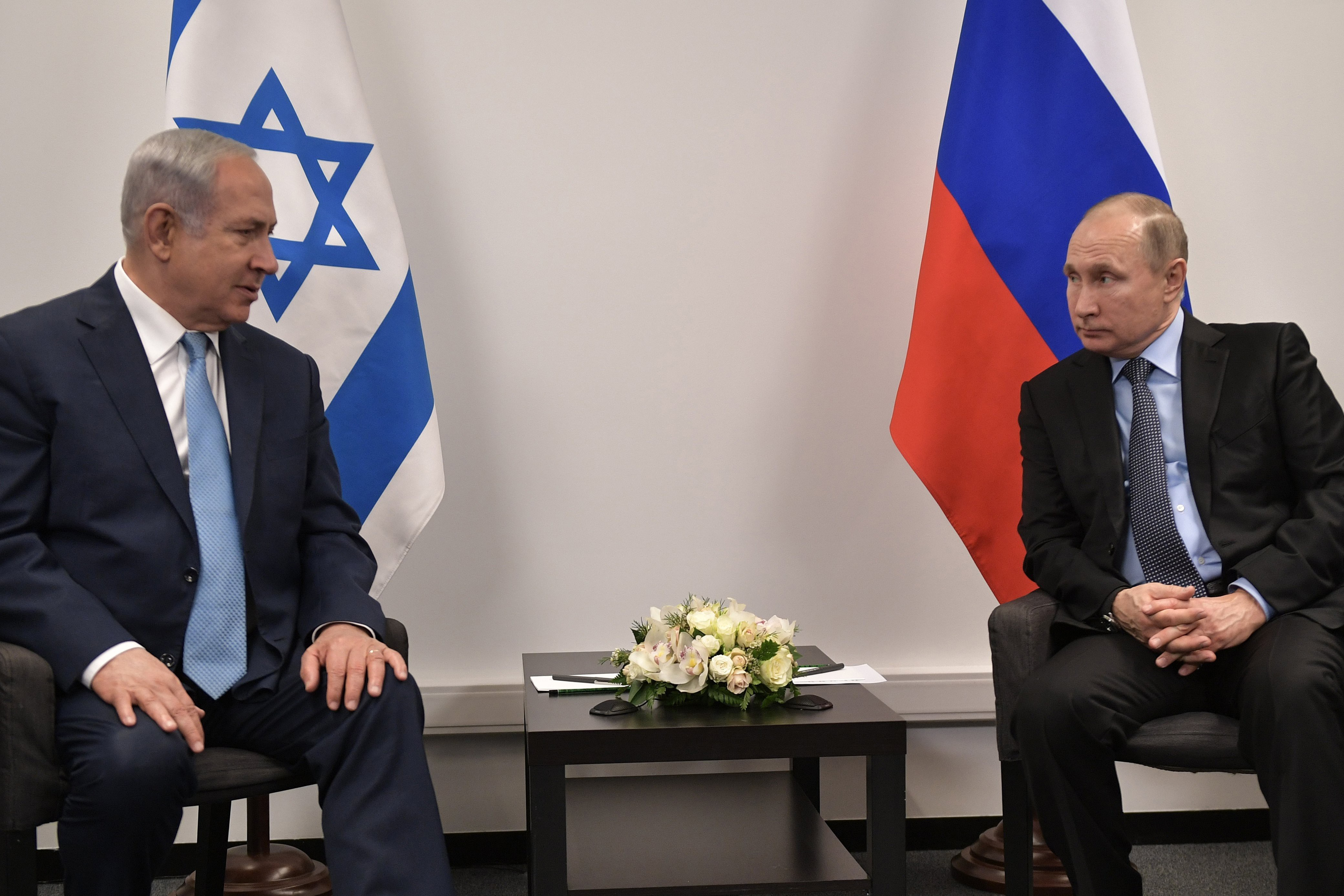
Israeli prime minister Benyamin Netanyahu and Russian president Vladimir Putin in 2018

Russian foreign policy in the Middle East became more involved during the early 2000s in light of the Iran–Israel proxy war. After 2001, the government of Vladimir Putin intensified Russia's involvement in the region, supporting Iran's nuclear programs and forgiving Syria 73% of its $13 billion debt. According to March 2007 brief entitled Russia's New Middle Eastern Policy: Back to Bismarck? by Ariel Cohen (Institute for Contemporary Affairs),

Syria ... was supplying Hizbullah with Russian weapons. In 2006, Israeli forces found evidence of the Russian-made Kornet-E and Metis-M anti-tank systems in Hizbullah's possession in southern Lebanon. The Russian response to accusations that it was supplying terrorist groups with weapons was an announcement, in February 2007, that Russia's military will conduct inspections of Syrian weapons storage facilities with the goal of preventing the weapons from reaching unintended customers. Predictably, such developments placed considerable strain on the already-deteriorating relations between Russia and Israel... For several years Russia has been attempting to engage in military cooperation with both Israel and Syria. However, the levels of cooperation with the two states are inversely related and an escalation of arms sales to Syria can only damage the relationship with Israel. Russian-Syrian military cooperation has gone through numerous stages: high levels of cooperation during the Soviet era, which was virtually halted until 2005, and now Russia's attempt to balance its relationship with both Israel and Syria. However, Russia's recent eastward leanings might indicate that Moscow is prepared to enter a new stage in its military cooperation with Syria, even if this is to the detriment of its relationship with Israel.

Israel–Russia relations improved after the Russian military intervention in Syria in September 2015. From then until July 2018, Israeli prime minister Benjamin Netanyahu and Putin met a total of nine times. Prior to and immediately after the 2016 United States presidential election, Israel began lobbying the United States to strike a deal with Russia over restricting the Iranian military presence in Syria in exchange for removing U.S. sanctions against Russia.

In 2019, Russia rejected an Iranian request to buy S-400 missile defense system. Ruslan Pukhov, head of the Center of Analysis of Strategies and Technologies in Moscow, said: "If Russia decides to provide Iran with S-400, it will be a direct challenge to Saudi Arabia and Israel, so it will be against Russia's own national interests."

== See also ==
- Attacks on U.S. bases in Iraq, Jordan, and Syria (2023–present)
- Arab Cold War
- Iran-Saudi Arabia proxy conflict
- List of modern conflicts in the Middle East
- Russia–Syria–Iran–Iraq coalition
- Persecution of Shias by the Islamic State
