= 2022 Istanbul terror plot =

Terrorist plot in Turkey

- Part of Iran–Israel proxy conflict
- Date: 30 May 2022 (travel advisory); 13 June 2022 (Mossad rescue operation); 14 June 2022 (arrests made); 23 June 2022 (arrests made public)
- Location: Istanbul
- Type: Terrorism
- Cause: Assassination of Hassan Sayyad Khodaei
- Target: Israeli tourists
- Accused: Iranian intelligence

In May and June of 2022, a terror plot was uncovered by Mossad and the National Intelligence Organization (MİT). The plot consisted of an Iranian-led terror cell which planned to kidnap, murder, and assault Israeli tourists in Istanbul. Israel had given advisories against travelling to Turkey on 30 May and upgraded the advisory on 13 June, amid threats made by Iran. Israel later told its citizens in Turkey to lock their doors after a couple had to be transported following a tip of an Iranian terror cell waiting to kidnap them. Several suspects were arrested on 14 June in Istanbul, while the arrests were made public the 23 of June.

== Background ==
In May, Israeli and Turkish security agencies foiled an Iranian plot to kidnap Israeli tourists in Turkey.

== First Travel Advisory ==
On 30 May, Israel issued a travel warning on non-essential on Turkey due to Iranian threats of revenge following the assassination of Khodaei.

== 13 June incident and advisory upgraded ==
On 13 June, an Israeli couple at a market were called and told on by Mossad to stay where they were due to an Iranian terror cell waiting for them at their hotel to kidnap them. It was reported that they were transported to Istanbul Airport, where they were put on a flight back to Israel. It was later reported that they were extensively questioned afterwards. In the aftermath of the rescue operation, Israel told its citizens to evacuate Istanbul and Turkey immediately. They were also told to postpone future trips to Turkey until further notice.

== Plot foiled and arrests made ==
On 23 June 2022, the National Intelligence Organization of Turkey announced that 10 Iranian and Turkish operatives had been detained in Istanbul's Beyoğlu area following multiple raids and weapons seizure. Local security forces reported that Iranian agents were still at large and that a former Israeli ambassador and his wife were allegedly targeted. It was later uncovered that the suspects had been arrested on 14 July near Taksim Square.

== Reactions ==
- Foreign Minister of Israel Yair Lapid thanked Turkish officials and forces for helping to uncover a conspiracy to harm Israelis.
- (Iran) The Iranian Foreign Ministry denied Israeli and Turkish claims of a plot, rendering them 'baseless'.
- (Turkey) Turkish media reported that Iran had paid the agents.

== See also ==
- 2011 alleged Iran assassination plot
- 2012 attacks on Israeli diplomats
- 2012 Cyprus terrorist plot
