= Stas Misezhnikov =

Israeli politician (born 1969)

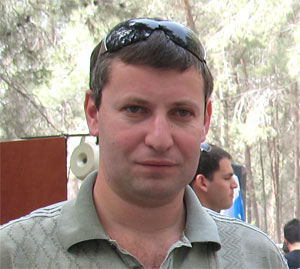
- Misezhnikov in 2009

Ministerial roles
- 2009–2013: Minister of Tourism

Faction represented in the Knesset
- 2006–2013: Yisrael Beiteinu

Personal details
- Born: 28 February 1969 (age 57) Moscow, Soviet Union

Stas Misezhnikov (Hebrew: סטס מיסז'ניקוב; born 28 February 1969) is an Israeli politician who served as a member of the Knesset for Yisrael Beiteinu and as the country's Minister of Tourism.

== Biography ==
Born in Moscow in the Soviet Union (today in Russia), Misezhnikov emigrated to Israel on 7 September 1982. He attended high school in Rishon LeZion. After finishing his military service in the Israel Defense Forces, he studied at Tel Aviv University, earning a BA in Social and Political Sciences in 1992 and an MA in Business Administration and Marketing in 2000. Between 1997 and 1999 he worked as a parliamentary aide in the Knesset, and then from 1999 until 2006 as a marketing manager at Clalit.

In 2003 he became a member of Rishon LeZion city council, on which he served until 2006. For the 2006 Knesset elections he was placed sixth on the Yisrael Beiteinu list, and became a Knesset member when the party won 11 seats. He retained his seat in the 2009 elections, for which he was placed third on the party's list. Following the election he was appointed Minister of Tourism in Binyamin Netanyahu's government.

The Israeli Embassy in Madrid called his visit to Spain an embarrassment after Misezhnikov allegedly canceled a dinner with business contacts in favor of private partying. Misezhnikov hotly denied the charge, claiming he was stuck at a Holocaust memorial event. There was further controversy in October 2010 when Misezhnikov was accused of politicizing a forthcoming OECD tourism conference in Jerusalem, when he stated that by holding a meeting in Jerusalem, the OECD recognized the city as Israel's capital. The Israeli government intervened and the head of the Knesset Committee on Jerusalem called Misezhnikov as a "diplomatic neophyte".

In the aftermath of the 2012 Burgas bus bombing, Misezhnikov traveled to Bulgaria in an effort to maintain its tourism connections with Israel. He met with Prime Minister Boyko Borisov and President Rosen Plevneliev.

On 4 December 2012, it was announced that Misezhnikov would not be a candidate for the 2013 Knesset elections.

Misezhnikov is married to Hila and is a father of three. He lives in Rishon LeZion.

== Controversy ==
In 2012 a Channel 2 report cited anonymous former bodyguards of Misezhnikov's who claimed that the minister regularly went out drinking and attended strip clubs. They also alleged that Misezhnikov nightlife habits caused him to miss an emergency cabinet meeting on the Gilad Shalit negotiations. Misezhnikov denied the allegations and claimed he had been cleared of wrongdoing in an investigation by the Israeli Civil Service Commission.

== Corruption case ==
Misezhnikov was one of the Yisrael Beiteinu officials indicted for corruption and other crimes as part of Israel's 'Case 242' investigation. His charges included a quid pro quo exchange of funding for a student festival in 2012 on the conditional employment of Misezhnikov's romantic partner, as well as straw purchases of cocaine by Misezhnikov through his ministerial aides. Misezhnikov entered a plea deal for all charges in October 2017 and was sentenced to 15 months imprisonment. On 17 December 2017, he arrived at Hermon Prison in the Galilee to begin serving his sentence. On July 2, 2018, the President of Israel rejected a request by former minister Misezhnikov for a reduction of his sentence under the presidential amnesty granted on the occasion of the 70th anniversary of the State of Israel
