= 2012 Burgas bus bombing =

Suicide attack against Israeli civilians at the Burgas Airport in Bulgaria

- Part of the Israeli–Lebanese conflict
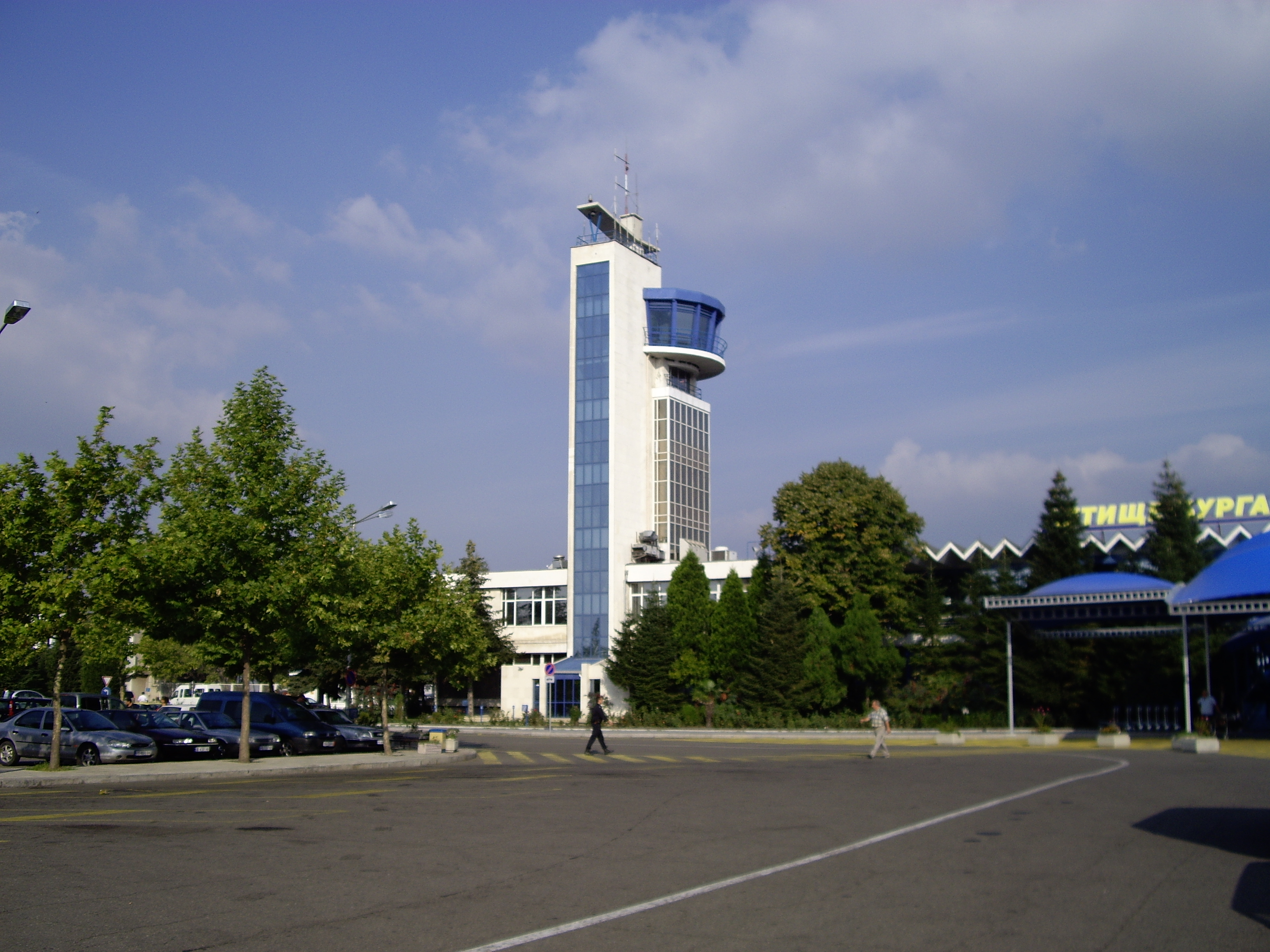
- Location of the bombing (near Burgas Airport)

- The location of Burgas Airport in Bulgaria
- Location: 42°34′00″N 27°31′13″E; Burgas Airport, Burgas, Bulgaria
- Date: 18 July 2012; 17:23 pm (UTC+3)
- Target: Israeli-operated buses
- Attack type: Suicide bombing
- Weapon: Unknown explosive device
- Deaths: 6 civilians (+1 bomber)
- Injuries: 32 civilians
- Perpetrator: Mohamad Hassan El-Husseini

The 2012 Burgas bus bombing was a terrorist attack carried out by a suicide bomber on a passenger bus transporting Israeli tourists at the Burgas Airport in Burgas, Bulgaria, on 18 July 2012. The bus was carrying 42 Israelis, mainly youths, from the airport to their hotels, after arriving on a flight from Tel Aviv. The explosion killed the Bulgarian bus driver and five Israelis and injured 32 Israelis, resulting in international condemnation of the bombing.

In February 2013, Tsvetan Tsvetanov, the Bulgarian Interior Minister, said there was "well-grounded" evidence that Hezbollah was behind the attack. Tsvetanov stated that the two suspects had Canadian and Australian passports and lived in Lebanon. According to the Europol, forensic evidence and intelligence sources all point to Hezbollah's involvement in the blast. Both Iran and Hezbollah have denied any involvement. On 5 June 2013, new Bulgarian Foreign Affairs Minister Kristian Vigenin stated that: "There is no conclusive evidence for the implication of Hezbollah in the July 2012 bombing in Burgas. The authorities continue to gather evidence." However, two weeks later a Bulgarian representative to the European Union revealed that investigators discovered new evidence that implicates Hezbollah operatives were connected to the terrorist attacks. Investigators found that the forged documents used by the perpetrators of the attack were facilitated by a man with ties to Hezbollah. In July 2013, the newly appointed Bulgarian Interior Minister Tsvetlin Yovchev stated: "there are clear signs that say Hezbollah is behind the Burgas bombing."

On 25 July 2013, the Bulgarian Interior Ministry released photographs of two Hezbollah operatives suspected in the bombing: Australian citizen Malid Farah (also known as "Hussein Hussein"), and Canadian citizen Hassan al-Haj. In 2013, and partly in response to the bombing, the EU unanimously voted to list the military branch of Hezbollah as a terrorist organization.

On 18 July 2014, Bulgaria announced that they identified the bomber as a dual Lebanese-French citizen named Mohamad Hassan El-Husseini. Over 12 years after the attack, in April 2025, following a negotiation with Lebanon's former head of intelligence Abbas Ibrahim, the Bulgarian authorities released the bomber's remains for burial in Lebanon. Although Hezbollah never formally claimed responsibility for the attack, El-Husseini was buried in a southern Beirut cemetery designated for the organization's fallen fighters.

== Attack ==
Six civilians and the suicide bomber were killed and at least 32 were injured in an explosion on an Israeli-operated tour bus at the Burgas Airport in the Black Sea city of Burgas. In addition, two other buses were damaged in the blast.

Bulgarian leaders, including President Rosen Plevneliev, rushed to the site. The Foreign Ministry said authorities believed that the blast was a terrorist attack. According to the initial reports of Bulgarian authorities, the blast was caused by a bomb in a luggage compartment. However, it was later argued by a Bulgarian official that the blast was probably carried out by a male suicide bomber with fake US documents.

An 11-year-old child and two pregnant women were among the injured, while another pregnant woman was killed. Mustafa Kyosev, the Bulgarian bus driver, was also killed at the age of 36.

Survivors of the attack described people being thrown into the air, people shouting and crying, and recalled seeing body parts. The witnesses said that the explosion began at the front of the bus and sent fire down through the vehicle. Some passengers on the bus jumped out of windows to escape.

Two days after the attack, Bulgarian Interior Minister Tsvetan Tsvetanov said that the bomb was carried in the backpack of a man who was filmed on security cameras at the airport. Tsvetanov added that the bomb was detonated in the luggage compartment of the bus, and that the blast was caused by 3 kilograms of TNT powder. In 2020, however, the bomb was identified as an ammonium nitrate-based device.

=== Fatalities ===
- Maor Harush (24) Acre—Israeli tourist
- Itzik Kolangi (28) Petah Tikva, Israel—Israeli tourist
- Mustafa Kyosov (36) Yurukovo, Bulgaria—Bus driver
- Amir Menashe (28) Petah Tikva, Israel—Israeli tourist
- Elior Preiss (25) Acre, Israel —Israeli tourist
- Kochava Shriki (42, pregnant) Rishon LeZion, Israel—Israeli tourist
- Mohamad Hassan El-Husseini (25) France—The bomber, dual Lebanese-French citizenship

== Perpetrator investigations ==
Following the attack, a probe was launched to determine who was responsible for the attack. Bulgarian Interior Minister Tsvetan Tsvetanov said that the investigation might take years. On 12 August, a probe into the attack concluded that the perpetrator was a suicide bomber, which disproved other possible theories, such as being a deluded drug smuggler. On 17 August, Tsvetanov said that the probe indicated that a country or terrorist organization was responsible for the bus bombing, but did not name any suspects.

=== Description ===
On 19 July, Tsvetanov stated that the suspected attacker is seen on security camera tape near the bus for about an hour before the blast and that he had a fake driver's license from the U.S. state of Michigan. The suspected bomber was described as a white male with long hair and wearing glasses.

Sketch released by Bulgarian authorities of a man who is believed to be either an accomplice or the bomber

Burgas prosecutor Kalina Tchapkanova quoted witnesses who said that the perpetrator "spoke English with a slight accent" and appeared to be Arab, while the wife of the owner of a car rental service said she was sure that the perpetrator was of Arab origin, and that he had a shaved head. The Bulgarian prosecutors said that the attacker had short hair, as opposed to the long hair seen in footage captured by a security camera at the airport, while a witness said that the perpetrator appeared to be wearing a wig. Other witnesses said that they saw the perpetrator speaking to tourists at local beaches in the days prior to the attack, and one witness said that the man told a group of tourists that his mother was Dutch and his father was Iranian.

On 24 July, Bulgarian prime minister Boyko Borisov said that a sophisticated group of conspirators who spent at least a month in Bulgaria before the bombing were responsible for the terrorist attack, confirming suspicions that the perpetrator was not alone. Prime Minister Borisov said that those involved in the bombing used leased vehicles and moved in different cities so they wouldn't be seen together. He added that the perpetrators were "exceptionally skilled" and that they operated under "strict conspiracy rules." Prime Minister Borisov said that officials believe he might have flown into Bulgaria from a European country in the Schengen passport-free travel zone, of which Bulgaria was not yet a member, and Bulgaria is exploring that lead with officials in other European countries. Prime Minister Borisov added that DNA samples from the suicide bomber was shared with all partner security services, but no match has been found yet in their databases. European security officials also said that images of the suicide bomber have not yet matched any of their databases, but it's possible the suicide bomber was not on a watch list.

On 5 February 2013, it was reported that the suspect was a dual Canadian-Lebanese national living in Lebanon.

On 18 July 2014, Bulgaria announced that they had identified the bomber as 25-year-old Lebanese-French citizen Mohamad Hassan El-Husseini through DNA testing. In April 2025, his remains were repatriated to Lebanon following negotiations with Bulgaria and was buried in a cemetery designated for Hezbollah fighters.

=== Accomplices ===
On 16 August, the Bulgarian authorities released a computer-generated image of a suspected accomplice, saying that "There is data that the man is related to the terrorist attack at the airport." The authorities thought it belonged to the suicide bomber, but a facial reconstruction determined that this was not the case, and raised the possibility of an accomplice. The authorities said that the suspected accomplice may have used various aliases while planning the terrorist attack, and used a fake driving license registered to "Ralph William Rico" from Grand Rapids, Michigan.

The alleged accomplice in the terrorist attack

On 21 August, a man from Plovdiv, a southern Bulgarian, said that he recognized the suspected accomplice, who he said he worked with for five years, and said that the accomplice is a Bulgarian who has been involved with people who preach Islamic extremism. Bulgarian police were investigating this lead as well.

In late August, on behalf of the Bulgarian government, Interpol attempted to recruit the help of member nations to identify one of the suspects in the investigation, and posted on its website an image of the alleged accomplice, urging anyone who had information about his identity to notify the authorities. The posted images include a copy of the fake driver's license in which the suspect seems to be wearing a wig. Interpol described the suspect as having possible Middle Eastern origin, 1.70–1.75 meters tall, and dark brown hair and eyes, who speaks English with an accent.

In October, Tsvetanov announced that the terrorist responsible for the attack had a maximum of five accomplices, all of which were foreign, and that the terrorist attack was plotted outside of Bulgaria for a year and a half.

=== Hezbollah and Iran ===
Immediately following the attack, Israeli prime minister Benjamin Netanyahu accused Hezbollah of carrying out the attack with the backing of Iran. Netanyahu vowed that Israel would "react firmly [to this] global Iranian terror onslaught"; Israeli president Shimon Peres promised retaliation against 'Iranian terrorist sites' around the world. Iran denied responsibility for the act. An Iranian Foreign Ministry spokesman rejected Netanyahu's accusation that the bombing was carried out by Hezbollah as a proxy for Iran as "baseless."

On 19 July, The New York Times reported that United States officials identified the suicide bomber as a member of Hezbollah. An unnamed senior official told The New York Times that the bomber had a fake Michigan driver's license, but there are no indications that he had any connection to the United States. He added that the attacker was "acting under broad guidance" to hit Israeli targets when opportunities presented themselves and that this guidance was given to Hezbollah from Iran, which uses Hezbollah as a proxy. Two other anonymous officials added that Hezbollah was behind the bombing, although declined to offer further information. One of the officials interviewed declined to describe what specific intelligence led to the belief that the bomber was from Hezbollah.

Although Iran has repeatedly denied supporting militant attacks abroad, a report by the New York City Police Department's intelligence analysts said that the suicide bombing in Burgas was the second plot unmasked there this year that is suspected to be perpetrated by Hezbollah and/or Iran. The report linked nine plots in 2012 in various countries to Iran or its proxies. That same day, Tsvetanov denied media reports that it was a local Hezbollah cell, saying that the possibility was not discussed. He added that the bomber was a foreign national who had been in the country for a minimum of four days, and was not Bulgarian, and also that investigators were following several leads, including that there was an accomplice. However, according to Vladimir Shopov, a political scientist at the New Bulgarian University, "For small Bulgaria to come out and openly name Hezbollah in such a way is as good as entering a minefield. There would have to be absolute certainty almost."

On 31 July, a member of the Bulgarian security establishment told The New York Times that there was a "clear direction that points to Hezbollah," in the pattern as well as evidence of the attack. White House Press Secretary Jay Carney stated, "It is certainly the case that Hezbollah and Iran have been bad actors, as a general matter, but we're not, at this point, in a position to make a statement about responsibility." The Pentagon has said that there were "distinctive Hezbollah markings" linked to the attack in Burgas, although at the time they could not "decisively state" who was responsible for the attack.

On 9 August, The New York Times reported that in the two months leading up to the terrorist attack, Israel's intelligence services intercepted numerous phone calls between Burgas and Lebanon, which increased significantly three days prior to the bombing. An Israeli official said, "We know the sources in Lebanon, though not the identity of those on the other end in Bulgaria." The New York Times also said that American and Bulgarian officials support Israel's assessment of the record, but won't announce that publicly. The newspaper also reported that a German intelligence official said there was skepticism regarding Hezbollah's involvement in the terrorist attack, and it is more likely that operatives with some connection to Hezbollah were used by Iran.

On 28 August, Lebanese newspaper Al-Jumhuriya reported that Bulgaria is "leaning toward" blaming Hezbollah for the terrorist attack. Iran has denied responsibility for the attack.

After Bulgaria's centre-right wing government was replaced by a Social Democratic-led one, the certainty about the charges were diminished.

=== Base of Jihad ===
On 21 July, an unknown group called "Base of Jihad" claimed responsibility for the attack in a statement that appeared on a Lebanese news site. However, a spokesman for Bulgaria's foreign ministry denied that the group was responsible.

=== Mehdi Ghezali ===
A few days after the attack, Bulgarian news sources published information alleging that the bomber was a Swedish citizen and former captive at Guantánamo Bay, Mehdi Ghezali. Swedish and Bulgarian authorities denied that these reports were correct, and United States officials said there was no evidence supporting the reports that Ghezali was responsible.

In early October 2012, the Bulgarian daily 24 Chasa gained access to an interview with a radical Salafi militant leader, Omar Bakri, who said that he recognized the suspect as being Mehdi Ghezali. After reports surfaced linking Ghezali to the attack, Bakri said that he called "my brothers in Great Britain" to determine the identity of the man, who told him that it was Mehdi Ghezali. In addition, Bakri said that his radical organization, Al-Muhajiroun, intended on paying damages to Mustafa Kyosov, the Muslim bus driver who was killed during the attack, but decided against this, because "Muslims are warned not to hang around near Jews if they don't want to get hurt." Bakri also alleged that Bulgaria and Eastern Europe was considered Islamic territory.

=== Conviction ===
In September 2020, a Bulgarian court sentenced in absentia two men to life in prison in connection with the bombing. The first was Meliad Farah, dual Lebanese-Australian National, while the second was Hassan El Hajj Hassan, a dual Lebanese-Canadian national. The whereabouts of both men were unknown and because of this they were placed on an Interpol red notice.

== Reactions ==
The terrorist attack in Burgas was denounced by governments and supranational organizations worldwide. Bulgaria's EU Humanitarian Aid Commissioner Kristalina Georgieva expressed her shock and sadness; Prime Minister Boyko Borisov called Israeli prime minister Benjamin Netanyahu and conveyed his condolences over the attack; Foreign Minister Nickolay Mladenov condemned the attack but said that it would be a mistake to prematurely jump to conclusions.

The Bulgarian Parliament unanimously adopted a declaration the day after the attack which condemned the terror attack, and urged the relevant authorities to take all measures in order to catch and bring to justice the perpetrators of the attack. The office of the Chief Mufti, Bulgaria's principal Muslim leader, condemned the terrorist attack and expressed its condolences to the families of the victims. The office excluded "the possibility that such people are Muslims."

Across the globe, foreign governments offered support and solidarity to the citizens and authorities of Bulgaria and Israel, and expressed their condolences for the victims. United Nations Secretary-General Ban Ki-moon condemned the attack in "the strongest possible terms" and expressed his condolences, and the United Nations Security Council unanimously condemned the attack in Burgas as a terrorist attack and expressed its condolences as well.

== Aftermath ==
After the attack, Burgas Airport was closed and flights were redirected to the airport of Varna. Israel's airline El Al canceled its flight from Tel Aviv to Sofia, which was supposed to leave at 16:00 GMT. A military service was held in honor of the victims at Ben Gurion International Airport. Two days after the attack, Israel's Mossad and Shin Bet agencies had teams on the ground in Bulgaria to assist the authorities in identifying the perpetrator. Interpol sent a team of experts to Bulgaria to investigate the terrorist attack. Interpol Secretary General Ronald Noble said that the information concerning the fake U.S. ID papers that the perpetrator used could be indispensable and of great value if it is found in Interpol's database.

The Israeli Air Force sent a C-130 Hercules transport plane to Burgas Airport, where it picked up 32 of the wounded and took them to Israel for treatment. A second Israeli C-130 landed in Sofia, carrying Magen David Adom specialists to evaluate the remaining wounded, and to judge whether it was safe to fly them home. The mission included military medical personnel, members of Unit 669, Home Front Command officers, along with a cadre of IDF officers. ZAKA personnel were also sent to Bulgaria to properly identify the bodies. At Ben-Gurion International Airport, 24 ambulances and medical were deployed to ensure that the injured could be swiftly transferred to local hospitals upon arrival.

The Washington Post's editorial page on 20 July contained an editorial headline "Holding Iran accountable for terrorist attacks," in which The Washington Post said that Iran must suffer for its acts of global terrorism, and "The Security Council should review the abundant evidence of involvement by the Revolutionary Guard and Hezbollah in this year's attacks and punish both those groups as well as the Iranian government with sanctions." The newspaper wrote "Using the territory of countries across the world, working sometimes through proxies like Lebanon's Hezbollah and sometimes with its own forces, Tehran has been intentionally targeting not just diplomats of enemies such as Israel and Saudi Arabia but also civilians."

In August, it was reported that Greek police fear a similar attack on Israeli tourists ahead of Israeli president Shimon Peres' visit to Greece. According to the report, police have raised the alert level and Greek intelligence is in constant contact with the Mossad.

=== Bulgarian and Israeli security ===
Around 70 Israelis who escaped the attack were immediately flown home on a Bulgarian plane.

Mayor Yordanka Fandakova of Sofia ordered a stronger police presence at all public places linked to the Jewish community, which numbers about 5,000.

The day after the attack, Israel boosted security at El Al airport counters and around embassies across the globe, whilst flight delays of up to 5–6 hours were reported at Ben-Gurion Airport. Mossad and Shin Bet officials convened a meeting on the same day to discuss future coordination and to assess the threat level in various countries throughout the world.

On 22 July, Mossad Director Tamir Pardo and Shin Bet (Internal Security Agency) Director Yoram Cohen briefed the Israeli Cabinet on the intelligence agencies' actions against terrorism perpetrated by or planned by Iran and Hezbollah around the world according to the intelligence agencies' assessment. Pardo and Cohen said that Iran and Hezbollah have attempted to perpetrate terrorist attacks in over 20 countries in the two years prior to the attack.

In September 2012, it was reported that Israeli Mossad agents and Bulgarian national security agents (SANS) are working together ahead of the Jewish holiday Rosh Hashana, which falls on Saint Sofia Day in 2012, to enhance security in and around synagogues, hotels, and churches. Intelligence agents will oversee traffic at airports in Sofia and Burgas as well. Although Israel's Counter Terrorism Bureau didn't issue a travel advisory to Bulgaria, it did ask authorities in Bulgaria, Thailand, Greece, and Cyprus to boost security around Israeli tourists ahead of the Jewish High Holidays.

=== Humanitarian relief efforts ===
Magen David Adom, Israel's national emergency medical, disaster, ambulance, and blood bank service, sent delegations to Bulgaria to help treat the wounded. The first delegation arrived on the night of the attack. The next morning, two Israeli Air Force C-130 Hercules aircraft landed in Burgas in order to airlift the Israelis injured in Wednesday's terror attack back to Israel.

Bulgaria's youngest-ever parliamentarian, Kalina Krumova, then 27, rushed to the hospital in jeans and sandals where the injured were being treated, and stayed there during the entire night alongside the Israeli aid teams. She assisted in translations for the aid teams and in communicating with the injured, since many of the hospital staff did not speak English. Professor Gabi Barbash, head of the Israeli rescue mission, said, "Without her, we would have been deaf and dumb."

In the afternoon of the day after the attack, a military plane safely returned the 32 Israelis who were wounded to Israel. That night, a C-130 that was sent to Sofia returned to Israel with three Israelis who suffered serious injuries during the attack.

=== Bulgaria–Israel relations ===
Noah Gal Gendler, a former Israeli ambassador to Bulgaria, said that relations between Israel and Bulgaria are extremely good at present, and the attack won't change this. Gal-Gendler said that the Bulgarian authorities are horrified and in shock.

In an effort to keep tourism ties strong between Bulgaria and Israel following the terrorist attack, Israeli tourism Minister Stas Misezhnikov traveled to Bulgaria with a delegation of prominent members of Israel's tourism sector and met with Bulgarian prime minister Boyko Borisov and President Rosen Plevneliev. At a press conference, Misezhnikov, Borisov, and Plevneliev announced that the two countries would strengthen their strategic cooperation in tourism and security. Misezhnikov also held a memorial ceremony at the site of the bombing. Misezhnikov stressed that "Terrorism will not disrupt our lives and stop our aspirations," and encouraged Israelis to keep traveling, saying that "tourism is a bridge to peace." He also thanked the Bulgarian government for its cooperation and its "dedicated treatment following the tragic terror attack."

On 25 August, Bulgarian Energy and Economy Minister Delyan Dobrev said that the flow of tourists to Bulgaria from Israel returned to normal, despite the terrorist attack causing a temporary decrease. Dobrev announced that 28 charter flights from Israel had arrived in Bulgaria a week before his announcement, indicating that the flow of tourists had been fully restored. Dobrev also suggested that this restoration was the result of Miszhnikov's visit to Bulgaria, as well as a promotional campaign for Bulgaria by four of Israel's largest print edition and interviews on local TV channels.

In order to demonstrate unity following the terrorist attack, the Israeli and Bulgarian governments met in Israel at Jerusalem in September 2012. Bulgarian prime minister Boyko Borissov, along with 12 out of 16 ministers, visited Israel for a joint meeting between the two governments. In addition, Borissov held one-on-one meetings with Israeli prime minister Benjamin Netanyahu and Israeli president Shimon Peres.

In another meeting in October 2012, Israeli president Shimon Peres praised Bulgarian president Rosen Plevneliev and Foreign Minister Nikolay Mladenov's response to the terrorist attack, while Knesset Speaker Reuven Rivlin invited the family of the slain bus driver to Israel. Peres thanked Bulgaria for saving Jews during the Holocaust and for continuing to support Israel after the terrorist attack. Plevneliev said that "together, Israel and Bulgaria will fight terror and evil."

== Bulgarian ceremony ==
In late August 2012, Bulgaria held a remembrance ceremony in honor of the victims of the terrorist attack. Two ceremonies were held, one in Sofia's largest synagogue, which prepared a curation of the ark that contained the names of the victims, and another ceremony was held in Burgas. Israeli groups were accompanied by guards and police canine units, and security was tight. Many families of the victims of the attack took part in the ceremony, and met with Bulgarian president Rosen Plevneliev, Bulgarian prime minister Boyko Borisov, and Bulgarian minister of tourism Dlyan Dobrev, and were also hosted at the Israeli ambassador to Bulgaria Shaul Kamisa's house.

At the ceremony, the Jewish Agency for Israel (JAFI) said that it would include the family of Mustafa Kyosov, the Muslim bus driver who was killed in the attack, among recipients of aid from the Fund for the Victims of Terror. The $1,500 grant was given to the Kyosovs in order to "ease their financial struggles and show the solidarity of the Jewish people with their loss."

Former Israeli Strategic Affairs Minister Moshe Ya'alon spoke at the ceremony as well, saying that:

Dozens were injured simply because they were Jews and Israelis. Every victim represents an entire world, a life story cut short, dreams that will not be fulfilled. Terrorism does not distinguish between blood and blood, and from person to person. Killers try to reach any place in the world to attack innocent Jews and Israelis, and would not hesitate to kill anyone who stood in their way when they implement their actions."

Blood-curdling terrorists do not distinguish between the blood of one person or another. These killers try to attack innocent Jews and Israelis, and they will travel to any part of the world, and kill anyone who stands in their way, in order to do so. [We will] hunt down the perpetrators of this disgusting terror act by any means necessary...and pursue them to the bitter end.

== See also ==
- Terrorism in the European Union
- List of terrorist incidents, 2012
- History of the Jews in Bulgaria
- 1992 attack on Israeli embassy in Buenos Aires
- 2012 attacks on Israeli diplomats
- 2012 Cyprus terrorist plot
