= Mohammad Ahmad Kazmi =

Indian freelance journalist

Syed Mohammad Ahmad Kazmi
- Born: 15 March 1962 (age 64)
- Occupation: Chief editor of qaumi salamati
- Office: Jor Bagh, New Delhi, India

Syed Mohammad Ahmad Kazmi is a freelance journalist, founder editor of Media Star News. Recently, he started a YouTube channel "Media Star World" which is primarily focused on International affairs from the Indian perspective. He was accused in the attack on Israeli diplomats. He was also covering this news and provided his observation on the situation on Times Now and NDTV.

== Career ==
Mohammad Ahmad Kazmi is now working for Media Star and created his own YouTube channel "Media Star World" which is majorly focusing on International affairs from the Indian perspective. On his channel he claims that he will be focusing on those news which mainstream media intentionally ignores. In past he was Chief Editor of daily Urdu newspaper Qaumi Salamati, with Printer, Publisher & Proprietor "Siraj Pracha" and was running his own news agency, Media Star, catering to the needs of Urdu readers in India and abroad, before his arrest. He has also been providing his services as freelance journalist for state broadcaster Doordarshan, Iranian news agency IRNA, Iranian radio, besides being a regular columnist for some widely-read Urdu newspapers in India. His professional commitments have taken him to Iran, Iraq, Syria, Afghanistan and many other countries. He is accredited to Press Information Bureau (PIB). of the Government of India and is supposed to have procured the security clearance from the Ministry of Home Affairs.

== Arrest and release ==
On 13 February 2012, a car belonging to the Israeli Embassy was attacked using a magnetic bomb in Delhi's Tughlak Road, injuring four people. The car was near the embassy when the incident occurred and injured an Israeli diplomat's wife, Tal Yehoshua (42). After three weeks, on 6 March 2012, the special cell of Delhi arrested Kazmi and charged him with being part of a conspiracy and booked him under the Unlawful Activities Prevention Act. During interrogations, the police claimed that he disclosed that he was privy to the conspiracy to target Israeli diplomats. A Sessions court later questioned the legality of a magisterial court's powers to extend under the Unlawful Activities Prevention Act the remand of Kazmi.

American journalist Gareth Porter reported that Kazmi was "framed by the police, at least in part to implicate the Iranians in the terror plot".

Kazmi was granted bail by the Supreme Court of India on 19 October 2012 but restrained from going abroad. As of 2016, Kazmi was still out on bail.

He served as an editor of an Urdu daily, Qaumi Salamati, in 2013. After getting clearance from ED and the court, he worked for Iran Radio in 2016.
