= 2012 Cyprus terrorist plot =

2012 Cyprus terror plot
- Location: Limassol and Larnaka, Cyprus
- Type: Terrorism
- Target: Israeli interests in Cyprus
- Outcome: Suspect arrested before committing the attack
- Arrests: 1
- Suspects: 1
- Accused: Hossam Yaakoub (Hezbollah)
- Convicted: Yes
- Verdict: Guilty
- Sentence: 4 years in prison

On July 7, 2012, local authorities arrested Lebanese-born Swedish citizen Hossam Yaakoub in Limassol, Cyprus. Yaakoub admitted to being a member of the Shi'a Islamic militant group Hezbollah, who had been tasked with surveilling the activities of Israeli tourists on the island. Israel condemned the incident as an attempted terrorist attack.

== Background ==
In the months preceding the disruption of the terrorist plot in Cyprus, Hezbollah and Iran were implicated in terrorist attacks and plots against Israeli targets in Thailand, India, Georgia, Azerbaijan, and Kenya. On July 18, eleven days after Yaakoub was arrested, five Israeli tourists and a Bulgarian citizen were killed in a suicide bombing in Burgas, Bulgaria. The Bulgarian government implicated Hezbollah in the attack.

== Arrest ==
On July 7, 2012, Cypriot authorities arrested Hossam Yaakoub, a Lebanese-born Swedish citizen, in the port city of Limassol. After intensive questioning, Yaakoub admitted that he was a member of Hezbollah.

Yaakoub had arrived in Cyprus as a tourist on July 5. Prior to his arrest, he was tracking the movement of Israeli tourists on the island. On July 6, he surveilled the arrival of Israeli tourists on an Arkia Airlines flight from Tel Aviv to Larnaca International Airport. Hezbollah had tasked Yaakoub with monitoring charter flights from Israel to Cyprus since late 2011. He recorded flight information and wrote down the registration numbers of shuttle buses the passengers boarded. In between flights, he carried out surveillance of the resort hotels that Israelis frequented. His surveillance data noted the security presence at the hotels and their proximity to local emergency services. He also photographed hotel entrances and parking lots. In a sworn deposition, Yaakoub told police, "I was just collecting information about the Jews. This is what my organization is doing, everywhere in the world."

Information provided by Israeli intelligence to Cyprus that Yaakoub intended to carry out attacks led to his arrest. Israeli Prime Minister Benjamin Netanyahu condemned the incident as an "attempted terrorist attack by Hezbollah against an Israeli target... conducted under Iran's auspices."

== Trial ==
On March 21, 2013, a three-judge panel in Cyprus convicted Yaakoub on five of eight charges, "including participation in a criminal organization, planning to commit a crime and money laundering." On March 28, the court sentenced Yaakoub to four years in prison. During the sentencing, the judges stated, "There is no doubt these are serious crimes which could have potentially endangered Israeli citizens and targets in the republic."

The conviction of Yaakoub, in tandem with the Bulgarian government's declaration that Hezbollah was behind the July 2012 Burgas bus bombing, has increased the pressure on the European Union to designate Hezbollah a terrorist organization. U.S. State Department spokeswoman Victoria Nuland said that the conviction of the Hezbollah operative in Cyprus "underscores the need for our European allies — and other governments around the world — to crack down on this deadly group."

== See also ==
- 1992 attack on Israeli embassy in Buenos Aires
- 2012 attacks on Israeli diplomats
- 2012 Burgas bus bombing
- 2022 Istanbul terror plot
