= 2012 attacks on Israeli diplomats =

Terror attacks in New Delhi, Tbilisi and Bangkok

- Part of Iran–Israel proxy conflict
- Location: New Delhi, India; Tbilisi, Georgia (attempted)
- Date: 13 February 2012
- Target: Israeli Diplomat
- Attack type: New Delhi: Bombing; Tbilisi: Attempted Bombing
- Weapon: IED
- Injuries: 4

On 13 February 2012, a bomb explosion on an Israeli diplomatic car in New Delhi, India, wounded one embassy staff member, a local employee and two passers-by. Another bomb planted in a car in Tbilisi, Georgia failed to explode and was defused by Georgian police.

== Background ==
In the preceding months there had been an escalating war of words between Israel and Iran. On 12 February 2012, the Iranian foreign ministry summoned the Azeri ambassador to complain against a report in The Times that Mossad had used Azerbaijan as a base for covert operations against Iran.

== Incidents ==
=== Azerbaijan ===
On 25 January 2012, Azerbaijani authorities detained three individuals who they suspected of plotting to attack the country's Israeli ambassador, Michael Lotem. The alleged plotters were identified as being connected to an Iranian citizen who had ties to Iranian intelligence. The President of Israel Shimon Peres thanked Azerbaijan's President Ilham Aliyev for thwarting the operation.

=== India ===
A motorcyclist attached a sticky bomb to the car of the wife of the Israeli defence attache to India while she was on her way to pick up her children from school. The woman, Tal Yehoshua Koren, sustained moderate injuries that required surgery to remove shrapnel while her driver and two bystanders suffered minor injuries.

=== Georgia ===
In February 2012, a car parked 200 meters (660 ft) from the Israeli embassy in Tbilisi was discovered to have a bomb after a local driver for the embassy heard a noise while he was driving. He pulled over to side of the road and discovered a bomb underneath his car. He then alerted the Georgian police, who defused the bomb.

== Investigation ==
Indian Home Minister P. Chidambaram said that the use of RDX was ruled out (which had previously been used in other attacks in India) and that no one was accused until investigations were over. He added that those who perpetrated the attacks would be brought to justice. Delhi Police had detained five people after the incident, but they were released after questioning. Indian authorities looked at CCTV footage for images of the perpetrator.

On 7 March 2012, Delhi Police arrested Indian journalist Mohammad Ahmad Kazmi who claimed to work for an Iranian news organisation. The police claimed that he had conducted a recce of the Israeli embassy along with three other Iranian nationals, one of whom executed the blast. They also claimed that he was in touch with the mastermind of the module, Masoud Sedaghatzadeh, and that Kazmi's wife received foreign remittances of ₹18.785 lakh through her bank account while Kazmi received ₹3,80,000(US$4600) from the module. On 3 April 2012, his bail petition was dismissed by a Court of Metropolitan Magistrate. The court cited prima facie evidence and large scale international ramifications to be among the reasons to dismiss his petition. On 10 April 2012, Directorate General of Income Tax Investigation and Enforcement Directorate registered a money laundering case under Prevention of Money Laundering Act against Kazmi. However, his relatives refuted all allegations. On 31 July 2012, Kazmi was chargesheeted. He was charged under various provisions of Unlawful Activities (Prevention) Act (UAPA), Indian Penal Code (IPC) including attempt to murder and Explosive Substances Act.

In July 2012, the Times of India reported that Delhi Police concluded that terrorists belonging to a branch of Iran's military, the Iranian Revolutionary Guards, were responsible for the attack. According to the report, the Iranian Revolutionary Guards may have planned other attacks on Israeli targets around the world as well. Yoram Cohen, the chief of Shin Bet, said that Iranian agents were seeking revenge for covert operations, including the assassinations of Iranian scientists.

Kazmi was granted bail in October 2012. As of 2016, Kazmi was still out on bail.

== Reactions ==
- Israel – Prime Minister Benjamin Netanyahu blamed Iran for both incidents. "Iran, which is behind these attacks, is the greatest exporter of terrorism in the world. The Israeli government and its security forces will continue to work together with local security services against these terrorist actions."

The Foreign Ministry had also put its embassies on high alert for the anniversary of the killing of Hezbollah commander Imad Mughniyah, as Hezbollah had vowed to avenge the attack by attacking Israelis overseas.

- Iran – Foreign Ministry spokesman Ramin Mehmanparast condemned the attacks, which it called "terrorist"; it rejected the Israeli allegation and denied responsibility for the incidents.

== Aftermath ==
The next day another failed attempt in Bangkok, Thailand led to the injuries of four people. Though the target was not known the perpetrators were said to be Iranian.

The attack was mentioned by Donald Trump, the President of the United States, as one of the terrorist attacks involving Qasem Soleimani, the Quds Force commander, in his speech after the 2020 Baghdad International Airport airstrike.

== See also ==
- Israeli Bangkok Embassy hostage crisis
- 1992 attack on Israeli embassy in Buenos Aires
- 2012 Burgas bus bombing
- 2012 Cyprus terrorist plot
- Tehran - a 2025 film based on the incident.
