= Iran–Israel relations =

Bilateral relations

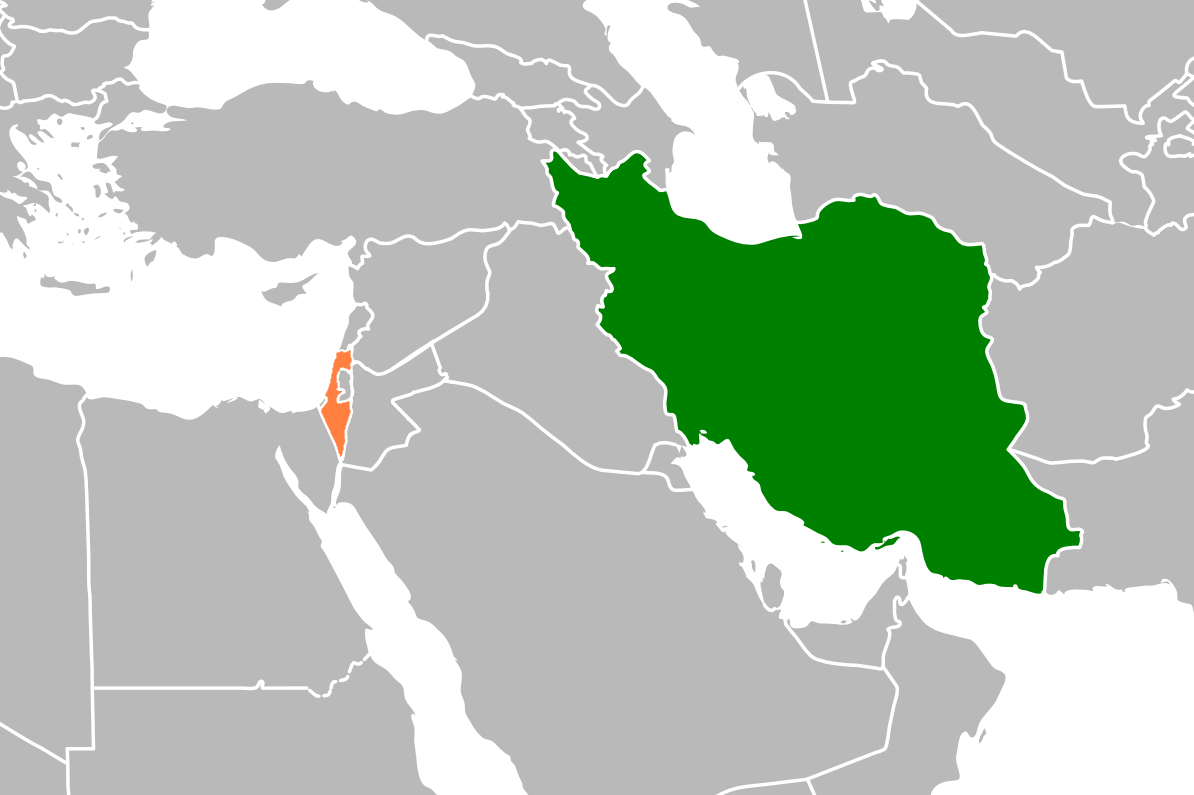

- Iran: Israel

Iran and Israel have not maintained a formal diplomatic relationship with each other since the Islamic Revolution in 1979. Beginning in the mid-1980s, the Iran–Israel proxy conflict has grown to largely dominate the atmosphere of Middle Eastern politics, with both countries' hostility escalating into open war in 2024, 2025, and 2026. The Iranian government of Ruhollah Khomeini severed all existing ties with Israel after seizing power from the Pahlavi dynasty, including by transferring the Embassy of Israel in Tehran to the Palestine Liberation Organization. As guided by the Islamic Revolution's ideology, Iran's foreign policy is primarily focused on destroying Israel and replacing it entirely with a Palestinian state. The Israeli government regards Iran as an existential threat, owing to the country's backing of various militant groups across the region. More recently, Iran's nuclear program has been the most significant source of tension between the two countries; Israel frequently mounts military and intelligence operations in Iran and has also assassinated Iranian nuclear scientists.

In 1947 and 1949, Iran joined 12 other countries in voting against the United Nations Partition Plan for Palestine and Israel's admission to the United Nations, respectively. Nevertheless, it became the second Muslim-majority country (after Turkey) to recognize Israel's sovereignty in spite of the Arab–Israeli conflict. Following the 1953 Iranian coup d'état, which enabled the pro-Western Iranian king Mohammad Reza Pahlavi to consolidate his power against the government, Iran–Israel relations improved considerably. Although Khomeini openly denounced Israel upon deposing Pahlavi in 1979, the Iraqi invasion of Iran in 1980 laid the foundation for a covert relationship during the ensuing Iran–Iraq War.

The turn from cold peace to open hostility began in the early 1990s, shortly after the dissolution of the Soviet Union and the defeat of Iraq in the Gulf War. Israeli prime minister Yitzhak Rabin's government adopted a more aggressive posture on Iran, and Iranian president Mahmoud Ahmadinejad made inflammatory statements against Israel. Other factors contributing to the escalation of tensions include the Iranian nuclear program, Iran's funding of Islamist groups such as Hezbollah, Palestinian Islamic Jihad, Hamas, and the Houthis, and Iran's involvement in attacks such as the 1992 Buenos Aires Israeli embassy bombing and the 1994 AMIA bombing, as well as Israeli threats of military action.

Iranian and Israeli organizations have been involved in direct military confrontations, such as in the 2006 Lebanon War. Iran and Israel have provided support for opposing factions in the Syrian and Yemeni civil wars and conducted cyberattacks and sabotage against each other's infrastructure, including attacks on nuclear facilities and oil tankers. Iran's proxy conflict with Saudi Arabia has led to an informal alliance between Israel and Arab states. In 2024, amid increasing regional tensions stemming from the Gaza war, Iran–Israel tensions escalated to a period of direct conflict; both carried out missile strikes on the other and Israel assassinated targets in Iran and Syria. In 2025, Israel carried out strikes against Iranian nuclear and military targets, sparking the 12 day long Iran–Israel war. In 2026, Israel and the United States launched a joint airstrike bombing campaign in Iran that is currently ongoing. As part of these strikes, Israel with U.S. support assassinated Iranian Supreme Leader Ali Khamenei on 28 February 2026.

== Timeline ==
=== Pre-modern background ===
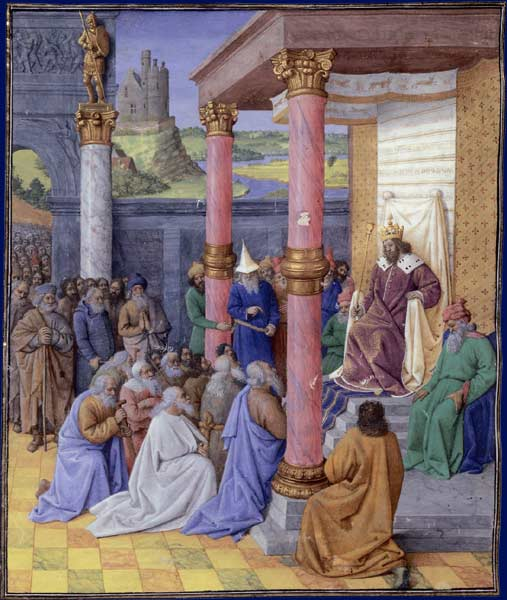
Cyrus the Great releases Jews from the Babylonian captivity to resettle and rebuild Jerusalem. Jean Fouquet, 1470.

The beginnings of Jewish history in Iran dates from late Biblical times. The biblical books of Isaiah, Daniel, Ezra, Nehemiah, Chronicles, and Esther contain references to the life and experiences of Jews in Persia. In the book of Ezra, the Persian king Cyrus the Great is credited with permitting and enabling the Jews to return to Jerusalem and rebuild their Temple; its reconstruction was carried out "according to the decree of Cyrus, and Darius, and Artaxerxes king of Persia" (Ezra 6:14). This is said to have taken place in the late sixth century BC, by which time there was a well-established and influential Jewish community in Persia. Persian Jews have lived in the territories of today's Iran for over 2,700 years, since the first Jewish diaspora when Shalmaneser V conquered the (Northern) Kingdom of Israel (722 BC) and sent the Israelites into captivity at Khorasan. In 586 BC, the Babylonians expelled large populations of Jews from Judea to the Babylonian captivity. Jews who migrated to ancient Persia mostly lived in their own communities.

The Jewish Bible's Ketuvim ends in Second Chronicles with the decree of Cyrus, which returned the exiles to the Promised Land from Babylon along with a commission to rebuild the temple.

'Thus saith Cyrus, king of Persia: All the kingdoms of the earth hath Yahweh, the God of heaven, given me; and He hath charged me to build Him a house in Jerusalem, which is in Judah. Whosoever there is among you of all His people—may Yahweh, his God, be with him—let him go there.' (2 Chronicles 36:23)

This edict is also fully reproduced in the Book of Ezra.

"In the first year of King Cyrus, Cyrus the king issued a decree: 'Concerning the house of God at Jerusalem, let the temple, the place where sacrifices are offered, be rebuilt and let its foundations be retained, its height being 60 cubits and its width 60 cubits; with three layers of huge stones and one layer of timbers. And let the cost be paid from the royal treasury. Also let the gold and silver utensils of the house of God, which Nebuchadnezzar took from the temple in Jerusalem and brought to Babylon, be returned and brought to their places in the temple in Jerusalem; and you shall put them in the house of God.' (Ezra 6:3–5)

As a result of Cyrus's policies, the Jews honored him as a dignified and righteous king. There is no evidence that the declaration reflected a unique attitude toward Jews. Rather, it may have been part of his renowned tolerance toward the cultures and religions of the people under his rule. The historical nature of this decree has been challenged. Professor Lester L Grabbe argues that there was no decree but that there was a policy that allowed exiles to return to their homelands and rebuild their temples. He also argues that the archaeology suggests that the return was a "trickle", taking place over perhaps decades, resulting in a maximum population of perhaps 30,000. Philip R. Davies called the authenticity of the decree "dubious", citing Grabbe and adding that J. Briend argued against "the authenticity of Ezra 1.1–4 is J. Briend, in a paper given at the Institut Catholique de Paris on 15 December 1993, who denies that it resembles the form of an official document but reflects rather biblical prophetic idiom". Mary Joan Winn Leith believes that the decree in Ezra might be authentic and along with the Cylinder that Cyrus, like earlier rules, was through these decrees trying to gain support from those who might be strategically important, particularly those close to Egypt which he wished to conquer. He also wrote that "appeals to Marduk in the cylinder and to Yahweh in the biblical decree demonstrate the Persian tendency to co-opt local religious and political traditions in the interest of imperial control".

According to the Bible, Cyrus ordered rebuilding the Second Temple in the same place as the first; he died before it was completed. Darius the Great came to power in the Persian empire and ordered the completion of the temple. According to the Bible, the prophets Haggai and Zechariah urged this work. The temple was ready for consecration in the spring of 515 BCE, more than twenty years after the Jews' return to Jerusalem.

According to the Book of Esther, during the reign of Persian King Ahasuerus, generally identified as Xerxes the Great (son of Darius the Great) in 6th century BCE, the vizier Haman instigated a plot to kill all the Jews of ancient Persia. The plot was thwarted by Queen Esther who ordered the hanging of Haman and his ten sons. This event is celebrated as the holiday of Purim.

=== Israeli independence to Iranian revolution (1947–1979) ===
In 1947, Iran was one of the 11 members that formed the Special Committee on Palestine (UNSCOP) charged to investigate the cause of the conflict in Palestine Mandate, and, if possible, devise a solution. After much deliberation the committee presented a Partition Plan for Palestine, which had the support of 8 of the 11 members of UNSCOP. Iran along with India and Yugoslavia opposed the plan, predicting it would lead to an escalation of violence. Arguing that peace could only be established through a single federal state, Iran voted against the partition plan when it was adopted by the UN General Assembly. Shah Mohammad Reza Pahlavi predicted that the partition would lead to generations of fighting.

In Spring of 1948, 30,000 Iranians in Tehran gathered to protest against the establishment of Israel.

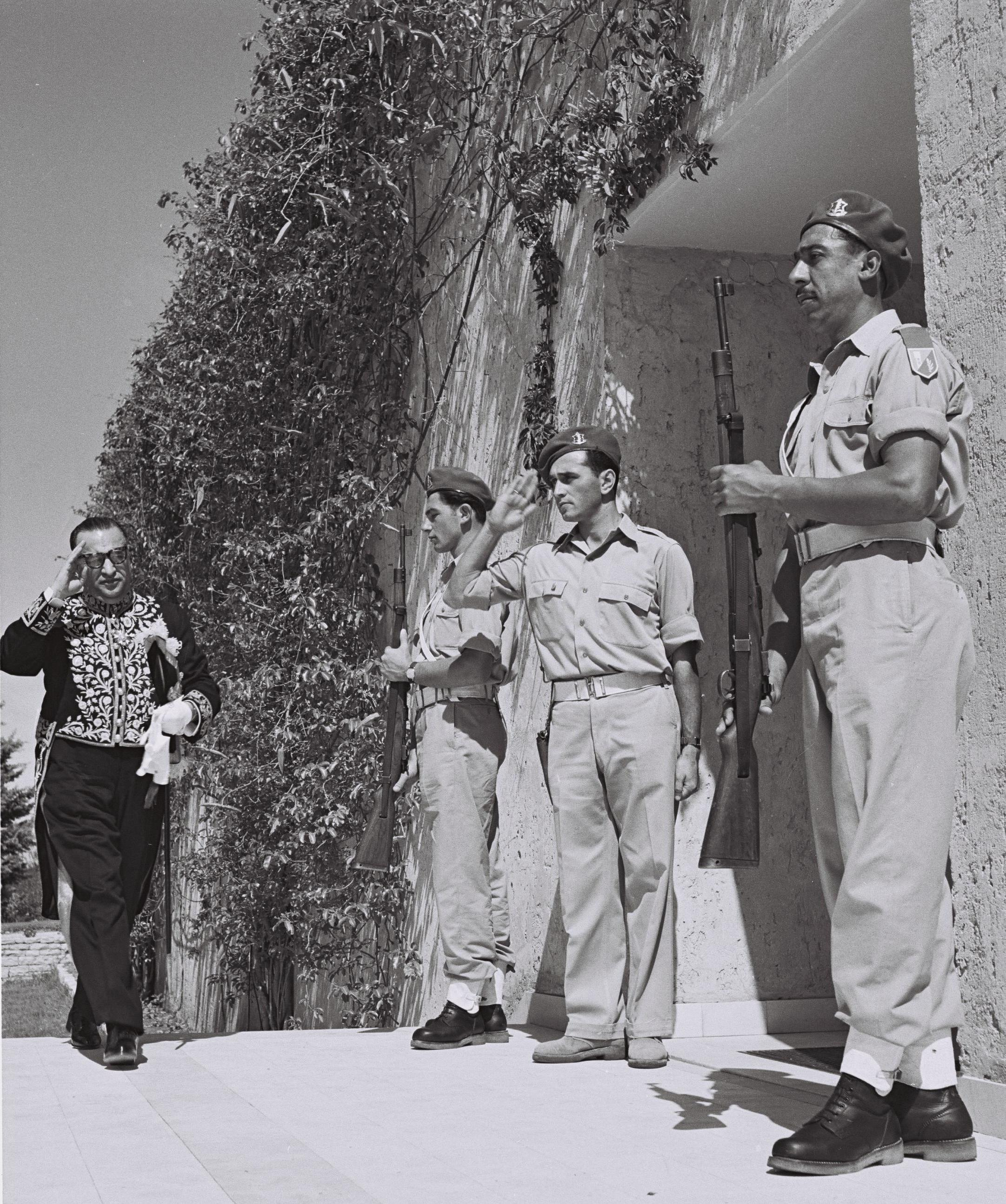
Iranian minister Reza Saffinia arriving at the house of Israeli president Chaim Weizmann in Rehovot on Yom Ha'atzmaut, 1950.

After the establishment of the State of Israel in May 1948, Israel and Iran maintained close ties. Iran was the second Muslim-majority country to recognize Israel as a sovereign state after Turkey. Israel viewed Iran as a natural ally as a non-Arab power on the edge of the Arab world, in accordance with David Ben Gurion's concept of an alliance of the periphery. Israel had a permanent delegation in Tehran which served as a de facto embassy, before Ambassadors were exchanged in the late 1970s.

After the Six-Day War, Iran supplied Israel with a significant portion of its oil needs and Iranian oil was shipped to European markets via the joint Israeli-Iranian Eilat-Ashkelon pipeline. Trade between the countries was brisk, with Israeli construction firms and engineers active in Iran. El Al, the Israeli national airline, operated direct flights between Tel Aviv and Tehran. Iranian-Israeli military links and projects were kept secret, but they are believed to have been wide-ranging, for example the joint military project Project Flower (1977–79), an Iranian-Israeli attempt to develop a new missile.

==== Debts ====
By 1979, Israel owed about a billion dollars to Iran for business conducted before the Iranian revolution. Some of the debt arose from oil purchased by Israel, and a larger amount from the operation of the Trans-Israel oil pipeline and associated port facilities, which were a joint venture between Israeli companies and the National Iranian Oil Company. Israel decided against paying the debt at a meeting in 1979 and granted legal indemnity to Israeli companies which owed it. At least one Israeli bank account is known to hold $250 million owed to Iran.

Since the 1980s, Iran has been suing in the European courts for payment of the debts and has won several cases. Payment of the debts is legally complicated by the international sanctions against Iran and by the fact that Israel classifies Iran as an enemy state. In May 2015, a Swiss court ordered the Eilat Ashkelon Pipeline Company to pay $1.1 billion to Iran, which Israel refuses to do.

=== Islamist advocacy for Palestinians (1947–1979) ===
Iranian Islamists have a long history of sympathizing with the Palestinians. In 1949, Iranian ayatollah Mahmoud Taleghani visited the West Bank and was moved by the plight of Palestinian refugees. Taleqani then began advocating for Palestinians inside Iran in the 1950s and 1960s. Ayotallah Taleghani also criticized the Iranian government's diplomatic relations with Israel and lamented that the Iranian government restricted pro-Palestinian meetings. Ayotallah Abol-Ghasem Kashani also criticized his government's decision to recognize Israel. Kashani, who had supported anti-colonial movements in Egypt and Tunisia, saw Israel as a colonial outpost.

After the Six-Day War in 1967, he started raising funds (e.g. zakat) inside Iran to be sent to Palestinians. The Iranian government at the time was alarmed at these activities and SAVAK documents indicate that the government believed that the Iranian public was sympathetic to the Palestinian people. Iranians often donated their zakat to Palestinians. By 1970, the Iranian government tried to prevent such fundraising efforts. SAVAK detained and surveilled Ayotallah Motahhari and pressured him to stop fundraising, but Motahhari refused. Likewise Ruhollah Khomeini championed the Palestinian people before he became Iran's Supreme Leader in 1979. He also criticized the Pahlavi dynasty's ties with Israel, viewing Israel as a supporter of the Pahlavi regime.

=== Under Khomeini (1979–1989) ===
Following the Iranian Revolution and the fall of the Pahlavi dynasty in 1979, Iran adopted a sharp anti-Israel stance. Iran cut off all official relations with Israel; official statements, state institutes, and events. Iran ceased to accept Israeli passports, and the holders of Iranian passports were banned from travelling to "the occupied Palestine". The Israeli Embassy in Tehran was closed and handed over to the PLO. Ayatollah Khomeini declared Israel an "enemy of Islam" and the "Little Satan". The United States was called the "Great Satan" while the Soviet Union was called the "Lesser Satan".

According to Trita Parsi, Iran's strategic imperatives compelled the Khomeini government to maintain clandestine ties to Israel, while hope that the periphery doctrine could be resurrected motivated the Jewish State's assistance to Iran. At the same time, Iran provided support for Islamist-Shia Lebanese parties, helping to consolidate them into a single political and military organization, Hezbollah, and providing them the ideological indoctrination, military training and equipment to attack Israeli and American targets.

=== Israeli logistical support for Iran during the Iran–Iraq War (1980–1988) ===
Israel sold Iran US$75 million worth of arms from stocks of Israel Military Industries, Israel Aircraft Industries and Israel Defense Forces stockpiles, in their Operation Seashell in 1981. Material included 150 M-40 antitank guns with 24,000 shells for each gun, spare parts for tank and aircraft engines, 106 mm, 130 mm, 203 mm and 175 mm shells and TOW missiles. This material was transported first by air by Argentine airline Transporte Aéreo Rioplatense and then by ship. The same year Israel provided active military support against Iraq by destroying the Osirak nuclear reactor near Baghdad, which the Iranians themselves had previously targeted, but the doctrine established by the attack would increase potential conflict in future years.

Arms sales to Iran that totaled an estimated $500 million from 1981 to 1983 according to the Jafe Institute for Strategic Studies at Tel Aviv University. Most of it was paid for by Iranian oil delivered to Israel. "According to Ahmad Haidari, "an Iranian arms dealer working for the Khomeini government, roughly 80% of the weaponry bought by Tehran" immediately after the onset of the war originated in Israel.

An Iranian stamp issued in memory of Suleiman Khater, who perpetrated the Ras Burqa massacre against Israeli tourists in 1985

According to Mark Phythian, the fact "that the Iranian air force could function at all" after Iraq's initial attack and "was able to undertake a number of sorties over Baghdad and strike at strategic installations" was "at least partly due to the decision of the Reagan administration to allow Israel to channel arms of U.S. origin to Iran to prevent an easy and early Iraqi victory".

Despite all the speeches of Iranian leaders and the denunciation of Israel at Friday prayers, there were never less than around one hundred Israeli advisers and technicians in Iran at any time throughout the war, living in a carefully guarded and secluded camp just north of Tehran, where they remained even after the ceasefire.

Israeli sales also included spare parts for U.S.-made F-4 Phantom jets. Ariel Sharon believed it was important to "leave a small window open" to the possibility of good relations with Iran in the future.

=== Increasing tensions (1989–present) ===
==== Supreme Leader Ayatollah Ali Khamenei ====
In December 2000, Ayatollah Ali Khamenei called Israel a "cancerous tumour" that should be removed from the region. In 2005, he emphasized that "Palestine belongs to Palestinians, and the fate of Palestine should also be determined by the Palestinian people". In 2005 Khamenei clarified Iran's position after an international furor erupted over a remark attributed to President Ahmadinejad according to which Israel should be "wiped off the map" by saying that "the Islamic Republic has never threatened and will never threaten any country".

On 15 August 2012, during a meeting with veterans of the Iran–Iraq War, Khamenei said that he was confident that "the superfluous and fake Zionist (regime) will disappear from the landscape". On 19 August, he reiterated comments made by President Mahmoud Ahmadinejad, which members of the international community, including the United States, France, European Union foreign policy chief Catherine Ashton, and United Nations Secretary General Ban Ki-moon condemned, during which he called Israel a "cancerous tumour in the heart of the Islamic world" and said that its existence is responsible for many problems facing the Muslim world.

On 9 September 2015, Khamenei said in his speech during the discussion about the JCPOA: "I'd say to Israel that they will not see the end of these 25 years". These words were expressed in response to the Zionist regime, which said that had no more concern about Iran for the next 25 years after the JCPOA agreement.

==== Khatami presidency (1997–2005) ====
Under reformist Iranian President Mohammad Khatami, elected in 1997, some believed Iran–Israel relations would improve. Khatami called Israel an "illegal state" and a "parasite", but also said in 1999 Jews would be "safe in Iran" and all religious minorities would be protected. A report indicates that Iran tried in 2003 to initiate a rapprochement with Israel by recognizing its existence in a proposal to the United States. The report claims that Iran's peace proposal with Israel was not accepted by the United States. In January 2004, Khatami spoke to an Israeli reporter who asked him on what grounds Iran would recognize Israel. This was believed to be the first time he had spoken publicly with an Israeli. At the funeral of Pope John Paul II in April 2005, Khatami was seated close to the Iranian-born Israeli President Moshe Katsav, who is from the same province, the Yazd Province, as Khatami. Katsav said that he shook Khatami's hand and the two had a brief conversation about Iran. Khatami denied this.

==== Ahmadinejad presidency (2005–2013) ====
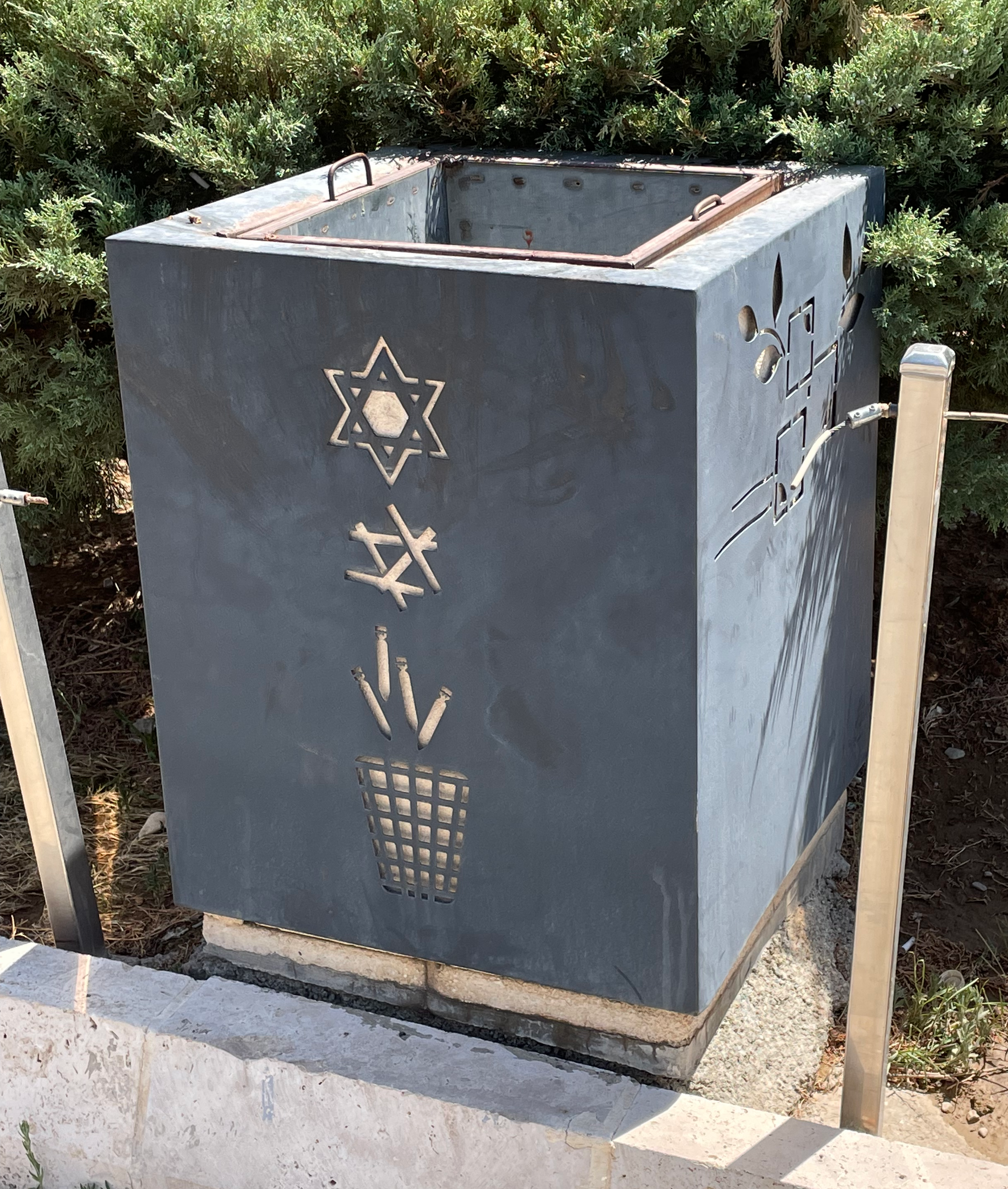
Government sponsored anti-Zionist artwork on a dustbin displayed in front of the Holy Defense Museum in Tehran, Iran.

The election of Mahmud Ahmedinijiad, a hardliner of Iranian politics, relations with Israel became increasingly strained as the countries engaged in a series of proxy conflicts and covert operations against each other.

During the 2006 Lebanon War, Iranian Revolutionary Guards (IRGC) were believed to have directly assisted Hezbollah fighters in their attacks on Israel. Multiple sources suggested that hundreds of IRGC operatives participated in firing rockets into Israel, and secured Hezbollah's long-range missiles. IRGC operatives were allegedly seen operating openly at Hezbollah outposts during the war. In addition, IRGC operatives were alleged to have supervised Hezbollah's attack on the INS Hanit with a C-802 anti-ship missile. The attack severely damaged the warship and killed four crewmen. It is alleged that between six and nine IRGC operatives were killed by the Israeli military during the war. According to the Israeli media their bodies were transferred to Syria and from there, flown to Tehran.

During and immediately after the Gaza War, the Israeli Air Force, with the assistance of Israeli commandos, was reported to have carried out three airstrikes in Sudan against Iranian arms being smuggled to Hamas through Sudan, as Iran launched an intensive effort to supply Hamas with weapons and ammunition. Israel hinted that it was behind the attacks. Two truck convoys were destroyed, and an arms-laden ship was sunk in the Red Sea. On 4 November 2009, Israel captured a ship in the eastern Mediterranean Sea and its cargo of hundreds of tons of weapons allegedly bound from Iran to Hezbollah.

In 2010, a wave of assassinations targeting Iranian nuclear scientists began. The assassinations were widely believed to be the work of Mossad, Israel's foreign intelligence service. According to Iran and global media sources, the methods used to kill the scientists is reminiscent of the way Mossad had previously assassinated targets. The assassinations were alleged to be an attempt to stop Iran's nuclear program, or to ensure that it cannot recover following a strike on Iranian nuclear facilities. In the first attack, particle physicist Masoud Alimohammadi was killed on 12 January 2010 when a booby-trapped motorcycle parked near his car exploded. On 12 October 2010, an explosion occurred at an IRGC military base near the city of Khorramabad, killing 18 soldiers. On 29 November 2010, two senior Iranian nuclear scientists, Majid Shahriari and Fereydoon Abbasi, were targeted by hitmen on motorcycles, who attached bombs to their cars and detonated them from a distance. Shahriari was killed, while Abbasi was severely wounded. On 23 July 2011, Darioush Rezaeinejad was shot dead in eastern Tehran. On 11 January 2012, Mostafa Ahmadi Roshan and his driver were killed by a bomb attached to their car from a motorcycle.

In June 2010, Stuxnet, an advanced computer worm, was discovered. It is believed that it had been developed by U.S. and Israel to attack Iran's nuclear facilities. In a study conducted by Institute for Science and International Security it is estimated that Stuxnet might have damaged as many as 1,000 centrifuges (10% of all installed) in the Natanz enrichment plant. Other computer viruses and malware, including Duqu and Flame, were reportedly related to Stuxnet. Iran claims that its adversaries regularly engineer sales of faulty equipment and attacks by computer viruses to sabotage its nuclear program.

On 15 March 2011, Israel seized a ship from Syria bringing Iranian weapons to Gaza. In addition, the Mossad was also suspected of being responsible for an explosion that reportedly damaged the nuclear facility at Isfahan. Iran denied that any explosion had occurred, but The Times reported damage to the nuclear plant based on satellite images, and quoted Israeli intelligence sources as saying that the blast indeed targeted a nuclear site, and was "no accident". Hours after the blast took place, Hezbollah fired two rockets into northern Israel, causing property damage. The Israel Defense Forces reacted by firing four artillery shells at the area from where the launch originated. It was speculated that the attack was ordered by Iran and Syria as a warning to Israel. The Israeli attack was reported to have killed 7 people, including foreign nationals. Another 12 people were injured, of whom 7 later died in hospital. The Mossad was also suspected of being behind an explosion at a Revolutionary Guard missile base in November 2011. The blast killed 17 Revolutionary Guard operatives, including General Hassan Moqaddam, described as a key figure in Iran's missile program. Israeli journalist Ron Ben-Yishai wrote that several lower-ranked Iranian missile experts had probably been previously killed in several explosions at various sites.

In response to Israeli covert operations, Iranian agents reportedly began trying to hit Israeli and Jewish targets; potential targets were then placed on high alert. Yoram Cohen, the head of Shin Bet, claimed that three planned attacks in Turkey, Azerbaijan and Thailand were thwarted at the last minute. On 11 October 2011, the United States claimed to have foiled an alleged Iranian plot that included bombing the Israeli and Saudi embassies in Washington DC and Buenos Aires. On 13 February 2012, Israeli embassy staff in Georgia and India were targeted. In Georgia, a car bomb failed to explode near the embassy and was safely detonated by Georgian police. In India, the car bomb exploded, injuring four people. Amongst the wounded was the wife of an Israeli Defense Ministry employee. Israel accused Iran of being behind the attacks. The following day, three alleged Iranian agents were uncovered in Bangkok, Thailand, thought to have been planning to kill Israeli diplomatic officials, including the ambassador, by attaching bombs to embassy cars. The cell was uncovered when one of their bombs exploded. Police responded, and the Iranian agent present at the house threw an explosive device at officers that tore his legs off, and was subsequently taken into custody. A second suspect was arrested as he tried to catch a flight out of the country, and the third escaped to Malaysia, where he was arrested by Malaysian Federal Police. Thai police subsequently arrested two people suspected of involvement. Indian police arrested a Delhi-based journalist in connection with February's car bomb, which injured four Israelis including the wife of an Israeli diplomat. Syed Mohammed Kazmi the journalist was arrested on 6 March 2012, he is said to have been in contact with a suspect police believe might have stuck a magnetic bomb to the diplomat's car. It is said Kazmi was an Indian citizen who worked for an Iranian publication.

In late February 2012, the Stratfor email leak included a claim that Israeli commandos, in collaboration with Kurdish fighters, destroyed several underground Iranian facilities used for nuclear and defense research projects.

On 18 July 2012, a bus carrying Israeli tourists in Bulgaria was destroyed in a bombing attack that killed five Israeli tourists and the driver, and injured 32 people. Israeli Prime Minister Benjamin Netanyahu blamed Iran and Hezbollah for the attack. In July 2012, a senior Israeli defense official stated that since May 2011, more than 20 terrorist attacks planned by Iran and Hezbollah against Israeli targets worldwide had been foiled, including in South Africa, Azerbaijan, Kenya, Turkey, Thailand, Cyprus, Bulgaria, Nepal, and Nigeria, and that Iranian and Hezbollah operatives were incarcerated in jails throughout the world.

On 6 October 2012, Israeli airplanes shot down a small drone as it flew over northern Negev. Hezbollah confirmed it sent the drone and Nasrallah said in a televised speech that the drone's parts were manufactured in Iran. On 24 October 2012, Sudan claimed that Israel had bombed a munitions factory, allegedly belonging to Iran's Revolutionary Guard, south of Khartoum. In November 2012, Israel reported that an Iranian ship was being loaded with rockets to be exported to countries within range of Israel and that Israel "will attack and destroy any shipment of arms". In January 2013, the Fordo nuclear plant was hit by an explosion. Iranian officials suspected Mossad or CIA were responsible. On 25 April 2013, Israeli aircraft shot down a drone off the coast of Haifa, allegedly belonging to Hezbollah.

On 30 January 2013, Israeli aircraft allegedly struck a Syrian convoy transporting Iranian weapons to Hezbollah. Other sources stated the targeted site was a military research center in Jamraya responsible for developing biological and chemical weapons. Two additional air strikes reportedly took place on 3 and 5 May 2013. Both targeted long-ranged weapons sent from Iran to Hezbollah. According to anonymous U.S. officials, Israel launched another airstrike or cruise missile attack on 5 July. It targeted Russian-made Yakhont anti-ship missiles near the city of Latakia, and killed several Syrian troops.

On 7 May 2013, residents of Tehran reported hearing three blasts in an area where Iran maintains its missile research and depots. Later, an Iranian website said the blasts occurred at a privately owned chemical factory.

==== Rouhani presidency (2013–2021) ====
===== In the Syrian Arab Republic =====
Several incidents have taken place on the Israeli–Syrian ceasefire line during the Syrian civil war, straining the Iran–Israel relations. The incidents are considered a spillover of the Quneitra Governorate clashes since 2012 and later incidents between Iran-supported Syrian Arab Army and the rebels, ongoing on the Syrian-controlled side of the Golan and the Golan Neutral Zone and the Hezbollah.

Since the onset of the Syrian War, the Israeli military is reportedly preparing itself for potential threats should there be a power vacuum in Syria. "After Assad and after establishing or strengthening their foothold in Syria they are going to move and deflect their effort and attack Israel", an Israeli official told The Associated Press in January 2014. Some experts say that while the encroaching militant forces on Israel's border will heighten security measures, the advancements are not likely to create significant changes to Israel's policy disengagement in the Syria crisis. IAF has been suspected of a number of airstrikes on Syrian soil, allegedly targeting Iranian and Hezbollah targets. According to the Israeli military, since 2017 it has carried out over 400 airstrikes in Syria (and other areas in the Middle East) targeting Iran and its allies.

===== In Israel =====
A court in Jerusalem has sentenced an Israeli man, Yitzhak Bergel to four-and-a-half years in prison for offering to spy for Iran. Bergel belongs to the anti-Zionist Neturei Karta, an ultra-Orthodox Jewish sect which is vehemently opposed to the State of Israel's existence.

===== International incidents =====
On 5 March 2014, the Israeli navy intercepted the Klos-C cargo ship. Israel stated Iran was using the vessel to smuggle dozens of long-range rockets to Gaza, including Syrian-manufactured M-302 rockets. The operation, named Full Disclosure and carried out by Shayetet 13 special forces, took place in the Red Sea, 1,500 kilometers away from Israel and some 160 kilometers from Port Sudan.

===== In Iran =====
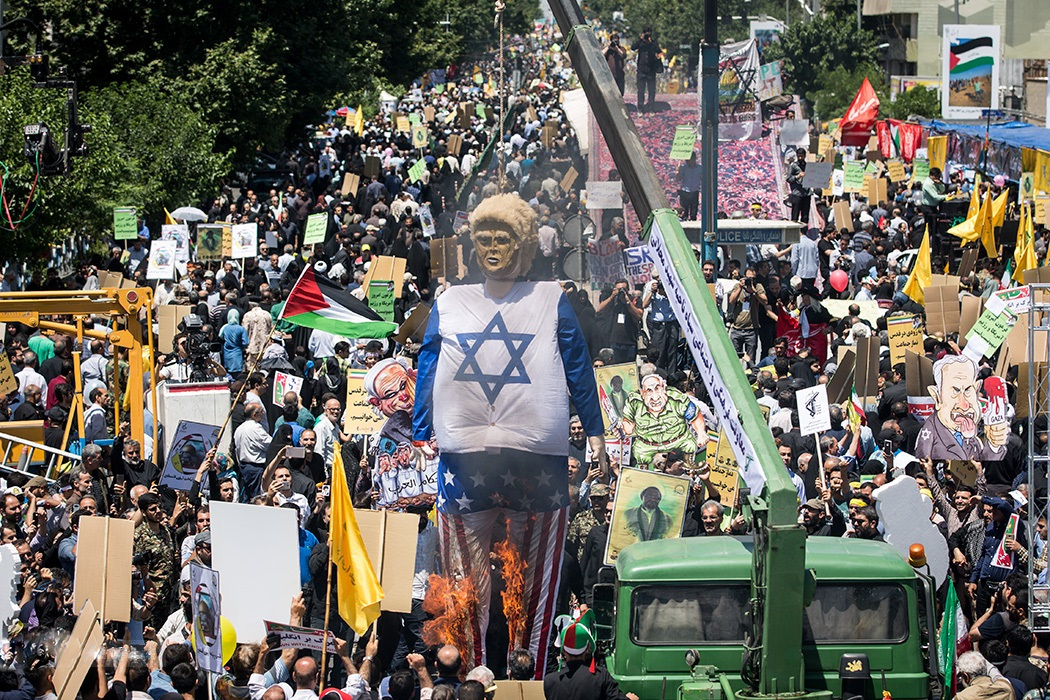
Protest in Tehran, Iran, 18 May 2018

On 6 May 2014, it was reported that a blast shook the Iranian city of Qazvin. Los Angeles Times reported that the city might be home to a secret nuclear facility.

Iranian state media reported that on 24 August 2014, IRGC had shot down an Israeli drone near Natanz fuel enrichment plant. The Israeli military did not comment on the reports.

Two workers were killed in an explosion that took place at a military explosives factory southeast of Tehran, near the suspected nuclear reactor in Parchin. In what was claimed by a Kuwaiti newspaper to be a response ordered by Iran, Hezbollah set off an explosive device on the border between Lebanon and the Israeli-controlled side of the Shebaa farms, wounding two Israeli soldiers. Israel responded with artillery fire toward two Hezbollah positions in southern Lebanon.

On 7 January 2026, Iranian state media reported that Iran executed a man identified as Ali Ardestani after convicting him of spying for Israel’s intelligence service, Mossad, a move criticised by human rights groups as part of a pattern of politically motivated executions and trials lacking due process.

==== Raisi presidency (2021–2024) ====
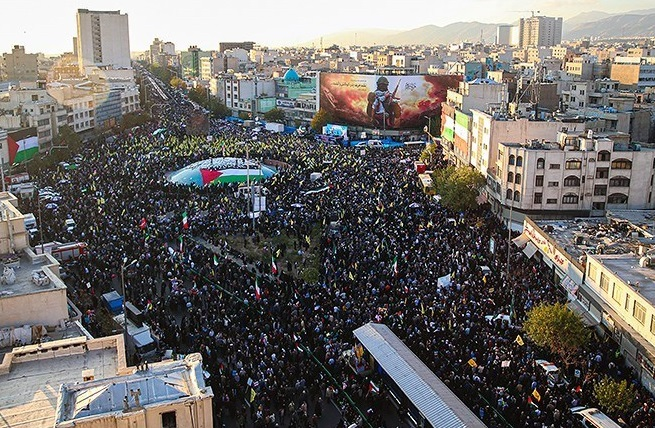
Protest against Israel's bombing of the Gaza Strip in Tehran on 18 November 2023

===== In Iran =====
In April 2022, President Ebrahim Raisi declared in the speech for military parade that "Iran's armed forces will target Israel's heart if it makes 'the slightest move'".

In May 2022, Colonel Sayad Khodayee was killed outside his home in Tehran by two gunmen on motorcycles. Iran blamed Israel for this. The spokeswoman of the Israeli prime minister refuse to "comment on the killing". But an unnamed intelligence official of Israel reported to NYT that Israel was responsible for the killing.

As NYT reported, Iran accused Israel of killing two Iranian scientists by "poisoning their food", according to an Iranian official who did not want to be named. The two scientists were Ayoub Entezari, an aeronautical engineer who worked for a military research center, and Kamran Aghamolaei, a geologist. Israeli media and Persian news channels abroad claimed that "Mr. Aghamolaei worked at Iran's Natanz nuclear facility".

===== International incidents =====
On 1 April 2024, the Iranian consulate annex building adjacent to the Iranian embassy in Damascus, Syria, was struck by an Israeli airstrike, killing 16 people, including Brigadier General Mohammad Reza Zahedi, a senior Quds Force commander of the Islamic Revolutionary Guard Corps (IRGC), and seven other IRGC officers. On 13 April, Iran retaliated against the attack with missile and drone strikes in Israel. On 19 April, Israel launched a series of retaliatory missile strikes on Iranian military sites. Iranian officials have also reported explosions at military sites in Syria and Iraq.

==== Pezeshkian presidency (2024–present) ====
On 5 August 2024 Ali Bagheri, Foreign Minister of Iran, notified his counterpart in Israel, Israel Katz, through the good offices of Hungary's Foreign Minister Péter Szijjártó of its intent to avenge the assassination of Palestinian Authority negotiator Ismail Haniyeh. Bagheri made no mention in his published transcript of the conversation of the particular act of Israel that wronged his country. Xinhua of China characterized Haniyeh as "Hamas Politburo Chief", and left no doubt that Iran's intent was to seek vengeance for his assassination.

On 1 October 2024, Iran launched about 180 ballistic missiles at Israel in retaliation for assassinations of Haniyeh, Hassan Nasrallah and Abbas Nilforoushan. On 27 October, Israel responded to that attack by strikes on a missile defence system in the Iranian region of Isfahan.

On 13 June 2025 Israel carried out strikes against Iranian nuclear and military targets the day after the International Atomic Energy Agency declared that Iran had violated its obligations regarding nuclear profiliation.

On 19 June 2025, during the Iran–Israel war, Iran launched a missile barrage targeting the Soroka Medical Center in Beersheva. The strike injured people in the hospital, caused severe damage and a suspected chemical leak, forcing patients to evacuate.

=== 2025–2026 Iranian protests ===
Beginning on 28 December 2025, mass demonstrations erupted across Iran amid a deepening economic crisis and widespread dissatisfaction with the Islamic Republic government. As protests continued, Israeli Prime Minister Benjamin Netanyahu expressed support for Iranian protesters.

Following Israeli Prime Minister Benjamin Netanyahu’s public support for Iranian protesters during the 2025–2026 demonstrations, former Israeli Prime Minister Naftali Bennett said that Israel had previously smuggled Starlink internet receivers into Iran to help anti-government protesters during periods of internet shutdowns. He said the plan involved bringing “tens of thousands” of Starlink devices into the country so people could stay connected to the internet and social networks when access was blocked. According to Bennett, the goal was to help protesters communicate and coordinate with each other and continue their activities despite restrictions.

In January 2026, Israel placed its military and security forces on high alert amid reports that the United States was considering possible intervention in Iran following widespread anti-government protests there. Iranian officials warned that Tehran would retaliate against both U.S. and Israeli targets in the event of an attack, contributing to heightened regional tensions and Israeli security planning.

Amid heightened regional tensions, Israeli mobile phone users reported receiving mass SMS messages containing threatening language, some from foreign numbers and occasionally including personal details, prompting public concern. Israeli cyber authorities said there was no evidence of hacking and assessed the messages as a psychological intimidation campaign of unconfirmed origin rather than a credible threat.

In late January 2026, senior Israeli and Saudi defense and intelligence officials traveled to Washington for consultations with U.S. counterparts regarding Iran, amid reports that U.S. officials were considering possible military options in response to developments there. At the same time, analysts cited by Reuters assessed that any potential U.S. or Israeli action against Iran was likely to be limited in scope in order to avoid wider regional escalation.

=== 2026 Iran war ===
Since 28 February 2026, Israel and the United States have been launching coordinated joint attacks on various sites in Iran, which has started a major conflict. Codenamed Operation Roaring Lion (Note: Hebrew: מִבְצַע שְׁאָגַת הָאֲרִי, romanized: Mivtsá She'agát Ha'arí) by Israel and Operation Epic Fury by the United States, it targeted key Iranian officials, military commanders and facilities, and was aimed at regime change. Iran's response has been named Operation True Promise IV, an incremental continuation of previous military operations named Operation True Promise.

As part of these strikes, Israel assassinated Khamenei on 28 February 2026, with his death confirmed the next day by Iranian state media after previously being first claimed publicly by Netanyahu.

== Destruction of Israeli government in Iranian policy ==
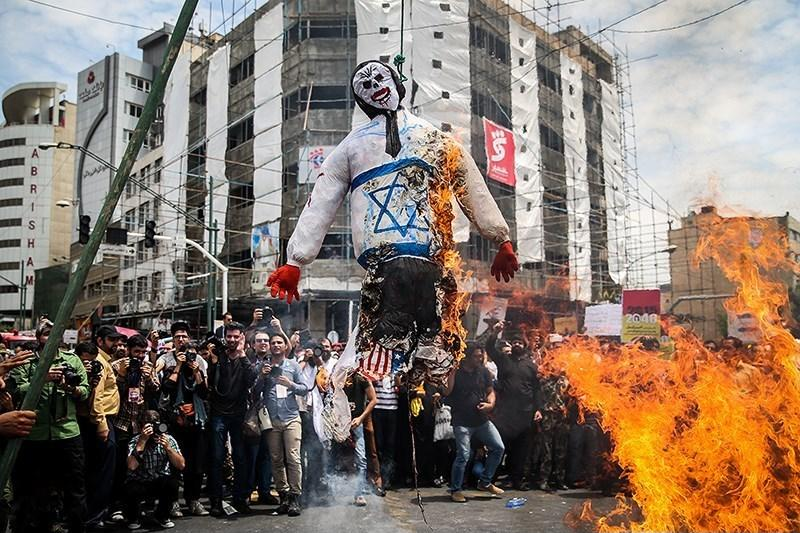
Quds Day celebrated in Tehran in 2016

U.S. scholar Afshon Ostovor suggests the Islamic Republic of Iran's foreign policy doctrine includes calling for the destruction of Israel as a Jewish entity, emerging from the 1979 Islamic Revolution, which transformed Iran–Israel relations from close partners during the Pahlavi monarchy to principal ideological adversaries. Ayatollah Ruhollah Khomeini, the founder of the Islamic Republic, denounced Israel as a "Zionist regime" and "Little Satan" in 1979 and cut off diplomatic relations, characterizing as illegitimate Israel's backing of the Shah, its close ties to the U.S., and its role in the ongoing Israeli–Palestinian conflict.

The rejection of Israel's legitimacy has remained consistent across both hardline and moderate Iranian leaderships. Supreme Leaders Ruhollah Khomeini and Ali Khamenei have both repeatedly referred to "the Zionist regime" as a "cancerous tumor" and publicly called for its elimination. Even reformist leaders and moderate clerics have supported this stance. Though having incorporated Holocaust denial and the invocation of antisemitic tropes in official propaganda, the Iranian government maintains that its opposition is directed at Zionism rather than at Jews or Judaism. U.S. diplomat Jeffrey Feltman interprets the slogan death to Israel as similarly contextualized to death to America; as a reaction to the Israeli government's policies towards Islamic countries and merely an expression of outrage at those policies, not a wish for literal death for Israeli people themselves. Two years after becoming supreme leader, Iran's Ali Khamenei interpreted this slogan as "in destroying the Israeli regime". Since the 1979 Islamic Revolution, this stance has been embedded in official rhetoric, military programs, state-sponsored education, and symbolic events such as Quds Day.

Iran’s anti-Israel policy is implemented through a centralized institutional framework led by the office of the Supreme Leader and the Islamic Revolutionary Guard Corps (IRGC). Operational activities are largely carried out via a network of allied non-state actors, including Hezbollah in Lebanon, the Houthis in Yemen, Hamas and Palestinian Islamic Jihad in the Palestinian territories, and other affiliated groups. These organizations receive sustained Iranian support in the form of funding, weapons, and training, and are collectively referred to by Iranian officials as the "Axis of Resistance." This proxy network enables Iran to exert influence across multiple fronts while posing an existential threat to Israel through asymmetric conflict. Additionally, statements by senior officials and the government's hostility toward Israel have led many observers to view Iran's nuclear ambitions as part of a broader strategy to destroy Israel.

=== Leadership ===
Once strategic partners, Iran and Israel's relationship ended after the 1979 Iranian Revolution. According to Efraim Karsh, the Islamic Republic subsequently cut ties with Israel and positioned it as a central ideological adversary. Since that time, Iran has declared the elimination of Israel as a central objective within the region. Ayatollah Ruhollah Khomeini, the Republic's founding Supreme Leader, branded Israel the "Small Satan", a counterpart to the United States as "Great Satan". Iranian leaders across generations, from Khomeini and his successor Ayatollah Ali Khamenei, to senior officials, military commanders, and state-aligned media, have consistently invoked rhetoric calling for Israel's elimination or forecasting its collapse.

==== Supreme leaders ====
Supreme Leader Ruhollah Khomeini referred to Israel multiple times as a "cancerous tumor" and a "cancerous gland.", and said it was "an obligation" to provide financial support to the Palestinian mujahideen "in order to abolish the infidel Zionists, who are the enemies of humanity." He urged Muslims to topple pro-Western governments and mobilise in pursuit of Israel's destruction. Khomeini’s hostility toward Israel was deeply entangled with his broader antisemitic worldview. He wrote that the Jews, “may God curse them,” were “opposed to the very foundations of Islam and wish to establish Jewish domination throughout the world." In practice he conflated Judaism and Zionism, asserting that "the clearest manifestation of the Jewish–Christian conspiracy against Islam was the establishment of Israel by Western imperialism in order to oppress the Muslims." Khomeini portrayed Jews as both "agents of the West" and the "real power behind the West". Their claim to statehood, he argued, was a violation of the divine order, insisting that because of their "evil deeds," Jews were burdened with "the wrath of God" and "condemned to eternal humiliation and subordination to Muslims."

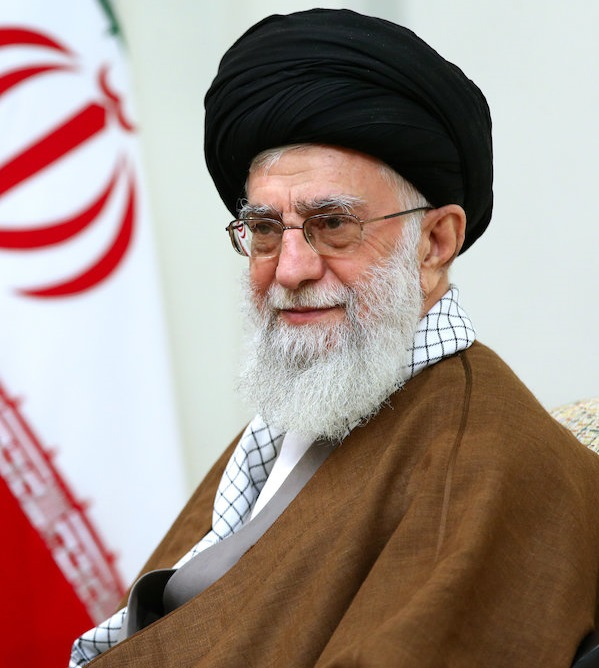
Supreme leader Ali Khamenei described Israel as a "malignant cancerous tumor" that must "be removed and eradicated"

In 2013, Supreme Leader of Iran Ayatollah Ali Khamenei, called Israel "an illegitimate regime" led by "untouchable rabid dogs" and "doomed to failure and annihilation." In 2015, he said there would be "no Zionist regime in 25 years" and that "during this period, the spirit of fighting, heroism and jihad will keep [Israel] worried every moment." Khamenei referred to Israel as "cancerous" on numerous occasions, has said Israel will be destroyed, and has pledged Iran's support for any group or nation confronting it.

On 3 October 2023, four days before the Hamas-led October 7 attacks on Israel, Khamenei delivered a speech in Tehran in which he said Israel would "die of [its] rage", and concluded by saying: "This cancer will definitely be eradicated, God willing, at the hands of the Palestinian people and the resistance forces throughout the region." In 2024, Ali Khamenei told Hamas leader Ismail Haniyeh: "The divine promise to eliminate the Zionist entity will be fulfilled and we will see the day when Palestine will rise from the river to the sea."

==== Presidents ====
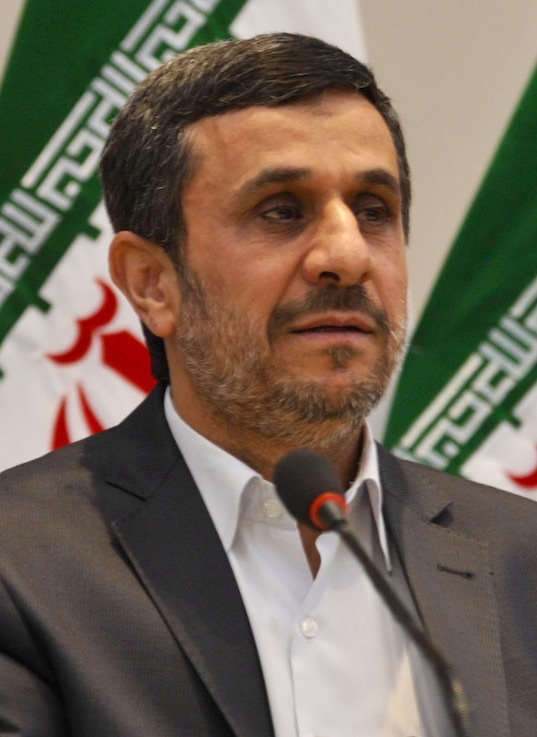
President Mahmoud Ahmadinejad called for Israel to be "erased from the face of the earth"

Former President Ayatollah Akbar Hashemi Rafsanjani said that the detonation of a single nuclear weapon inside Israel "will annihilate the entire country" (hame-ye Esra'il ra nabud khahad kard). In 2006, at the World Without Zionism conference, then-President Mahmoud Ahmadinejad invoked a quote from Ayatollah Khomeini calling for Israel to be "erased from the face of the earth" (mahv-e Esra'il az safhe-ye ruzegar). He also declared the Holocaust a myth that Israel considers "above God, religion and the prophets." In 2007, he said that Iran would "witness the destruction of this regime in the near future." In a 2012 interview, Ahmadinejad stated that Israel lacked historical roots in the Middle East and therefor would eventually be "eliminated", despite prior UN calls to refrain from using provocative language ahead of the General Assembly.

During the 2018 annual Islamic Unity Conference, ex-President Hassan Rouhani, called Israel a "cancerous tumor" and a "fake regime" created by Western powers to serve their interests in the Middle East. In 2023, then-President Ebrahim Raisi said he hoped God would "liberate Palestine as soon as possible" and that Iran could "witness the final moments of Israel's existence and celebrate its end."

==== Military commanders ====
In 2013, Hojatoleslam Ali Shirazi, representative of Supreme Leader Ali Khamenei within the Islamic Revolutionary Guard Corps (IRGC), said: "The Zionist regime will soon be destroyed, and this generation will be witness to its destruction." In 2014, Hossein Salami, then deputy commander of the IRGC, issued a series of aggressive statements against Israel. He threatened direct retaliation "for every drop of blood of our martyrs in Palestine, and this is the beginning point of Islamic nations awakening for your defeat." In another, he said "the Zionist regime is slowly being erased from the world", and predicted that "soon, there will be no such thing as the Zionist regime on Planet Earth."

In 2014, Hossein Sheikholeslam, then secretary-general of Iran's Committee for Support for the Palestinian Intifada, stated that "the issue of Israel's destruction is important, no matter the method" and warned that "the region will not be quiet so long as Israel exists in it."

In 2015, Hossein Salami declared that Iran would “open new fronts” against Israel and shift the regional balance of power. In 2019, Hossein Salami, then commander of the IRGC, stated: "This sinister regime must be wiped off the map and this is no longer... a dream (but) it is an achievable goal." Following the Hamas-led October 7 attacks on Israel in 2023, the Islamic Revolutionary Guard Corps (IRGC) deputy commander-in-chief, Ali Fadavi, said that "the resistance front's shocks against the Zionist regime will continue until this 'cancerous tumor' is eradicated from the world map."

In 2015, former Basij chief and senior RIGC officer, Mohammad Reza Naqdi, stated in an interview that the destruction of Israel is "nonnegotiable". In addition, according to the Times of Israel, Naqdi said that during the summer Gaza conflict with Israel, a significant portion of Hamas’s weaponry, training, and technical expertise was provided by Iran. In 2019, Naqdi made a direct call for the destruction of Israel during a televised interview. Naqdi asserted that the Zionist regime must be "annihilated and destroyed," asserting "This will definitely happen." He declared his intention to one day raise the flag of the Islamic Revolution over Jerusalem.

==== Clerics ====
In 2013, Ahmad Alamolhoda, a prominent Iranian cleric and member of the Assembly of Experts, said the destruction of Israel was "one of the pillars of the Iranian Islamic regime" and said: "We cannot claim that we have no intention of going to war with Israel." Ayatollah Hussein-Ali Montazeri, once designated as Khomeini’s successor and later a supporter of the reform movement, recalled telling a delegation of reformist parliamentarians that, according to Quran 7, the Jews of Zionism (yahudiyan-e sahyonizm) would be afflicted with torment and misery until the Day of Resurrection. He also cited a 17th-century hadith from Biḥār al-Anwār in which Imam Ja'far al-Sadiq is reported to have said three times that those who would ultimately exterminate the Jews (kasani keh nehayatan yahud ra monqarez mikonand) would be "the people of Qom", referring to the Iranian Shi'ite clergy.

In 2010, Mohammad Hassan Rahimian, Khamenei's representative to the Mostazafan Foundation, stated that Iran possesses missile capabilities that would allow it to destroy Israel "in its entirety with a big holocaust." Ayatollah Mohammad Musavi-e Bojnurdi, a senior jurist known for his association with the reformist Iranian Green Movement, said there was "no room for friendly relations with Israel."

=== Military strategy ===
==== Axis of Resistance ====
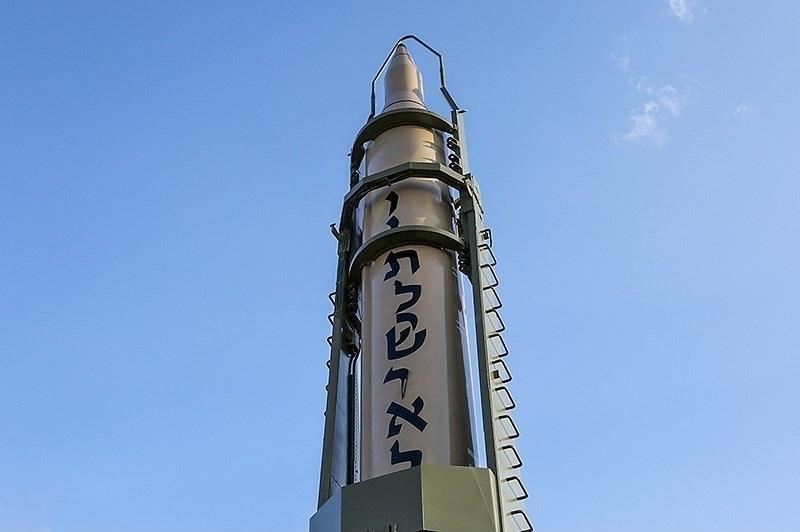
The words "Death to Israel", in Hebrew, on an Iranian Ghadr ballistic missile on display in Isfahan

Iran's refers to its strategic alliance with regional non-state actors, including Hezbollah in Lebanon, Hamas and Palestinian Islamic Jihad in the Palestinian territories, and the Houthi movement in Yemen, as the "Axis of Resistance". These groups receive Iranian support in the form of weapons, funding, and training. According to U.S. scholar Afshon Ostovar, the aim of this network is to present Israel with a long-term existential challenge by "slowly strangling" it through a series of "increasingly destructive, unwinnable wars."

According to Dana H. Allin, Iran has covertly supported Palestinian suicide attacks targeting Israeli civilians. The October 7 attacks on Israel—which killed approximately 1,200 people, mostly civilians, and saw the kidnapping of 250 hostages—was, at least in part, a product of Iran's strategy. The Wall Street Journal cited senior Hamas and Hezbollah members who said the IRGC helped plan the assault and gave the go-ahead during an 2 October meeting in Beirut. In the lead-up to the attack, about 500 Hamas and Palestinian Islamic Jihad fighters reportedly received training in Iran under the supervision of the IRGC Quds Force. According to The Washington Post, the attack occurred "with key support from [Iran] who provided military training and logistical help as well as tens of millions of dollars for weapons." Following the killing of Yahya Sinwar, Hamas leader, in an Israeli operation in mid-October 2024, a new mural appeared in Tehran bearing the message "The storm of Sinwar will continue" in reference to Al-Aqsa Storm, the name Hamas used for its 7 October attacks. Iranian foreign minister spokesman Nassar Kanaani openly congratulated the Palestinian militant groups for the 7 October attacks.

=== Nuclear program ===
The destruction of Israel is frequently cited as one of several strategic objectives behind Iran’s nuclear ambitions. The United States has maintained that a nuclear-capable Iran would likely use its capabilities to attempt the annihilation of Israel.

=== Missile program ===
Iran has inscribed the Hebrew words for "Israel must be erased" on some of its domestically produced missiles, a number of which have reportedly been transferred to Russia for use in its invasion of Ukraine.

=== Propaganda, symbolism, and ideological messaging ===
==== Quds Day ====
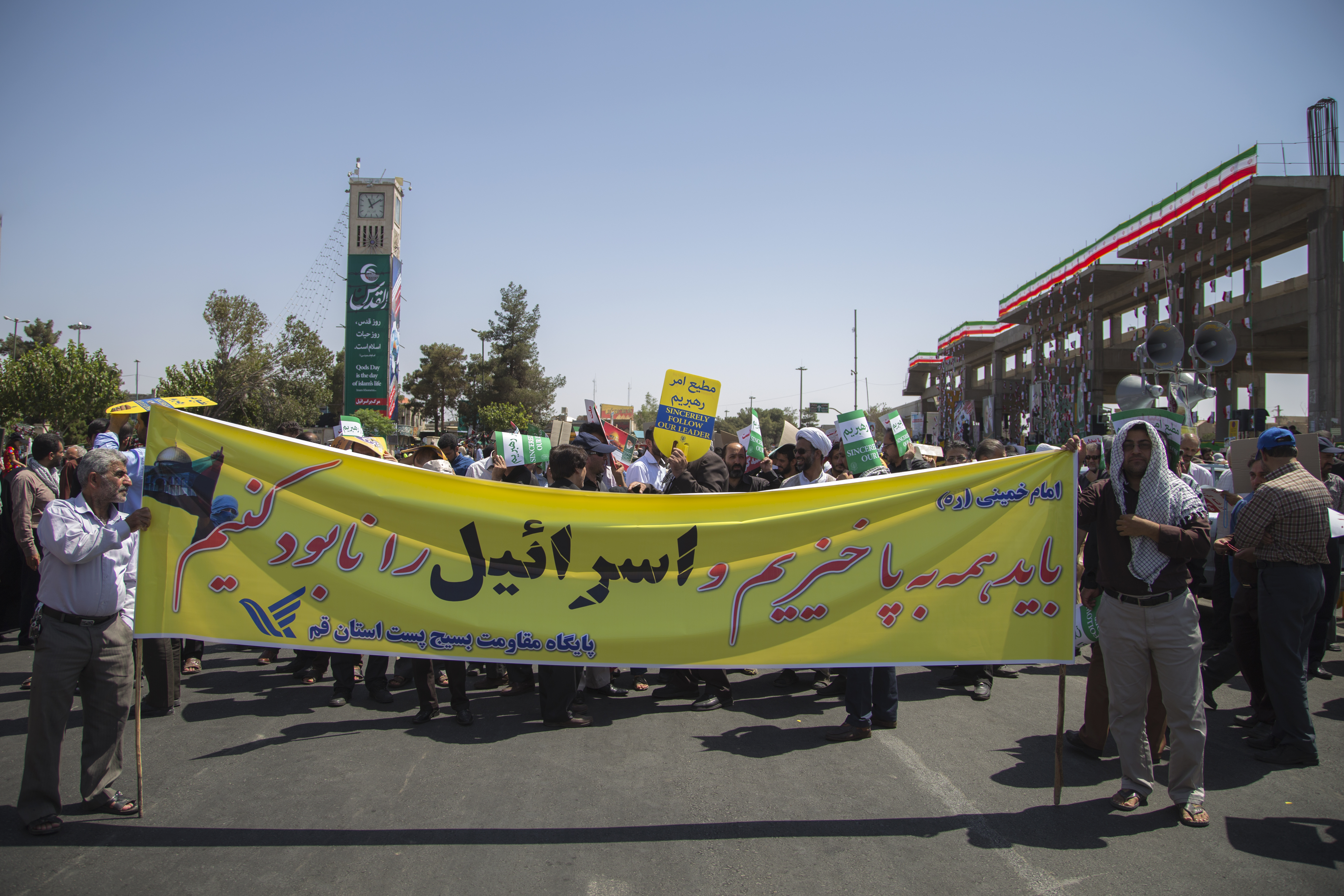
Participants in the Quds Day parade in Qom holding a banner quoting Khomeini: "We must all rise up and destroy Israel"

Established by Ayatollah Khomeini, Quds Day (Ruz-e Qods, in reference to Jerusalem) is celebrated annually on the last Friday of Ramadan and aims to promote Muslim solidarity against Israel. Senior clerics, including Ayatollah Naser Makarem Shirazi, have described participation in Quds Day as a form of religious worship (ebādat), intended to unite Muslims around the world.

According to an April 2024 report by Iran International, many Iranians see the annual Quds Day event as irrelevant and disconnected from the country's dire social and economic realities.

In 2017, a digital clock was installed in Palestine Square, Tehran for Quds Day, reportedly counting down to the destruction of Israel. It was programmed to count down 25 years from a 2015 statement made by Khamenei, in which he predicted that Israel would cease to exist within a quarter century.

==== Holocaust denial ====
Until recently, Iran was the only state whose leadership and institutions openly engaged in Holocaust denial (and at times justification) as part of official ideology. This rhetoric served to legitimize calls for the destruction of Israel by denying or minimizing the Holocaust, thereby undermining the historical justification for the state's existence and portraying it instead as a product of Western imperialism. Mohammad-Ali Ramin, a close advisor to Mahmoud Ahmadinejad, once stated that "the resolution" of the Holocaust issue would lead to the "destruction of Israel."

==== Conspiracy theories ====
Supreme Leader Ayatollah Khamenei told university students that Israel was created by Western powers with the explicit goal of preventing unity among Muslim states. Ayatollah Mahmoud Hashemi Shahroudi, former head of Iran's judiciary, claimed that "racist, anti-human" Zionism has "enslaved all of the world's peoples" and accused Muslim states of cooperating with a Zionist conspiracy of the "Hebrew polity" to divide the Islamic world. Iranian MP Emad Afroogh alleged that "Jewish rabbis" were responsible for Sheikh Yusuf al-Qaradawi's shift away from his previous moderation toward Shi'ites. IRGC Navy Commander Alireza Tangsiri, in 2022, claimed that Saudi rulers descend from the Jews of Medina and Khaybar, enemies of the Prophet Muhammad.

Iranian media, including outlets aligned with the reformist faction, have accused Israeli intelligence of making efforts to undermine Shi'ite religious rituals and sow sectarian discord. In one 2019 example, Mossad was alleged to have trained Israeli Jews as maddahan (ritual eulogists) to infiltrate mourning assemblies in Iran and deliberately mislead audiences into cursing or blaspheming.

Between 2011 and 2021, Iranian institutions organized dozens of ideologically driven conferences with provocative titles such as "Zionism and the SARS Disease", "Genocide in Rwanda and in Gaza" (where only one speaker addressed Rwanda and the remaining fifteen focused on Gaza), and "Judaism and Hollywood: A Diabolical Conspiracy", showing the regime's effort to link Zionism with global ills. These events, while often poorly attended, are publicly portrayed as major intellectual gatherings, with state media describing a half-empty auditorium as "standing room only" at a conference titled "The Jewish Roots of MI-6."

=== Responses ===
==== Academic ====
Efraim Karsh, a British–Israeli historian of Middle Eastern politics, has described Iran's posture toward Israel as genocidal. According to U.S. scholar Afshon Ostovar, Iran's campaign against Israel constitutes "the single most destabilizing conflict in the Middle East" and carries "the greatest potential to cause a broader regional war." American journalist Jeffrey Goldberg suggests that if Iran acquired nuclear weapons, it would likely intensify its efforts to destroy Israel. Setareh Sadeghi, a professor at the Faculty of World Studies at the University of Tehran, asserts that "Iran has never called for the elimination of a people, but an occupying regime that has stolen land from others and has been a colonial project of the Zionist entity."

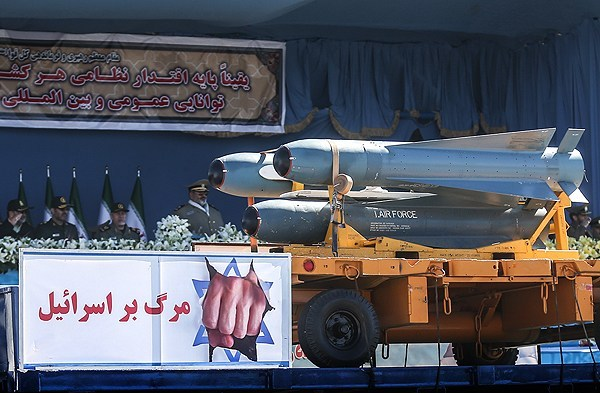
The words "Death to Israel" in Persian displayed on a parade celebrating Army Day, 2016

According to Ze'ev Magen, Death to Israel (marg bar Esra'il), along with Death to America, has been a commonly used slogan by Iranian officials for over a quarter of a century. Magen suggests the call for the conquest of Jerusalem is portrayed as a unifying jihad that could redirect Sunni opposition away from Shi'ite Iran, which positions Iran as the vanguard of global Islamic resistance.

==== Hardliner support within Iran ====
According to Mehdi Khalaji, a new generation of Iranian hardliners, closely tied to the Supreme Leader and the IRGC, has embraced the regime's doctrines, with many believing that Iran is a rising power, the United States is in decline, and that "Israel’s days are numbered."

==== Opposition within Iran ====
Sadegh Zibakalam, an emeritus professor of political science at the University of Tehran, has frequently spoken out against the regime's aggressive policies. He says that the Iranian public, especially the younger generation, is losing interest in the Palestinian issue and even expressing support for figures like Benjamin Netanyahu and Donald Trump. This support does not stem from alignment with their policies, but rather from opposition to the Iranian regime and its backing of groups such as Hamas and Hezbollah. Due to his statements, Zibakalam served an 18-month prison sentence and as of March 2025 was under investigation again, potentially facing further imprisonment. Abdollah Nouri, a prominent cleric and former interior minister, was sentenced to five years in prison in 1999 (making him the most senior Islamic Republic official to be jailed since the revolution) reportedly for, among other charges, openly challenging Khomeini's doctrine that Israel must be obliterated.

==== Jewish religious responses ====
Following the 1979 Iranian Revolution, Jewish religious leaders voiced concern over the potential implications of the new Islamic Republic's policies for Israel and Jewish communities in the region. Rabbi Menachem Mendel Schneerson, known as the Lubavitcher Rebbe, described the revolution as a significant turning point in global politics. In public addresses at the time, he warned that Iran's challenge to the United States would weaken American influence and embolden hostility toward Israel. The Rebbe also expressed alarm for the safety of the Jewish community in Iran, which then numbered approximately 50,000, and advocated for a communal day of fasting and prayer in response to the escalating crisis.

== Gallery ==
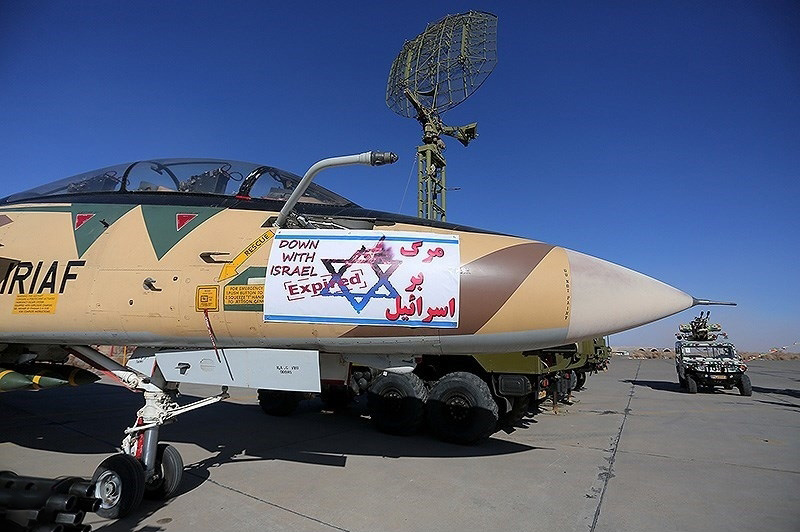
An Iranian F-14 Tomcat fighter jet on display in Isfahan bearing the slogan "Down with Israel" next to the word "Expired" (2019)

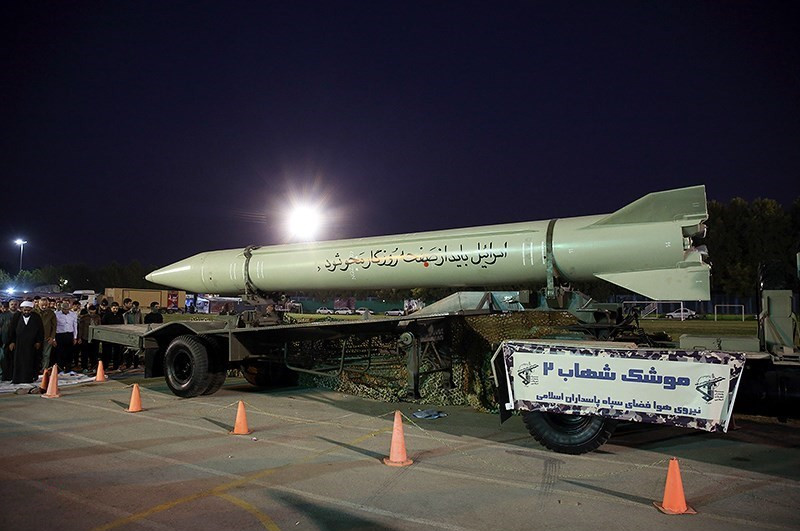
The slogan "Israel must be wiped off the face of the earth" inscribed on a Shahab-2 missile displayed in Mashhad (2019)

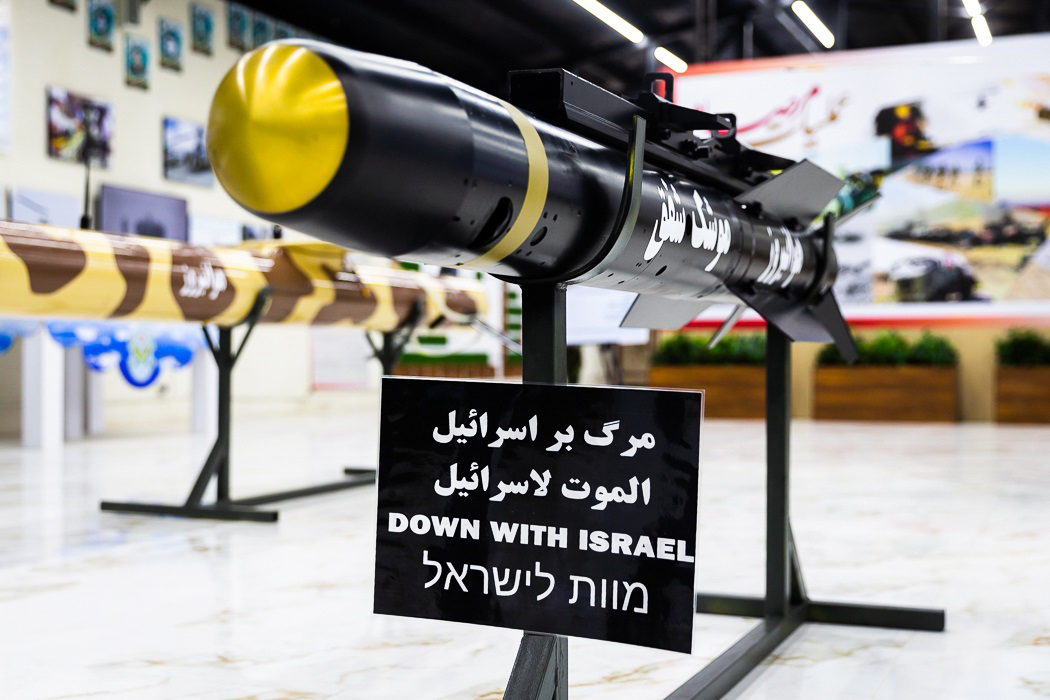
The phrase "Death to Israel" displayed in four languages (accompanied by a softened English translation reading "Down with Israel") at the Iranian Army Aviation Museum (2019)

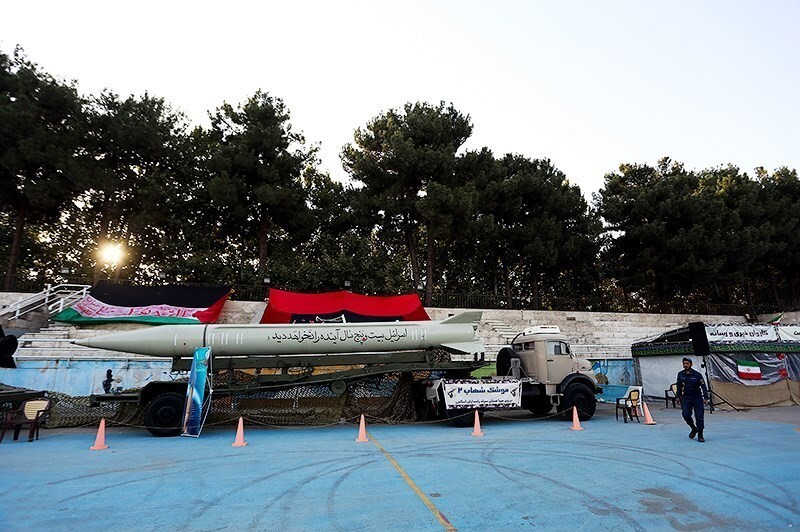
The slogan "Israel will not see more than five years into the future" inscribed on a missile during the Sacred Defense Week exhibition in Mashhad (2019)

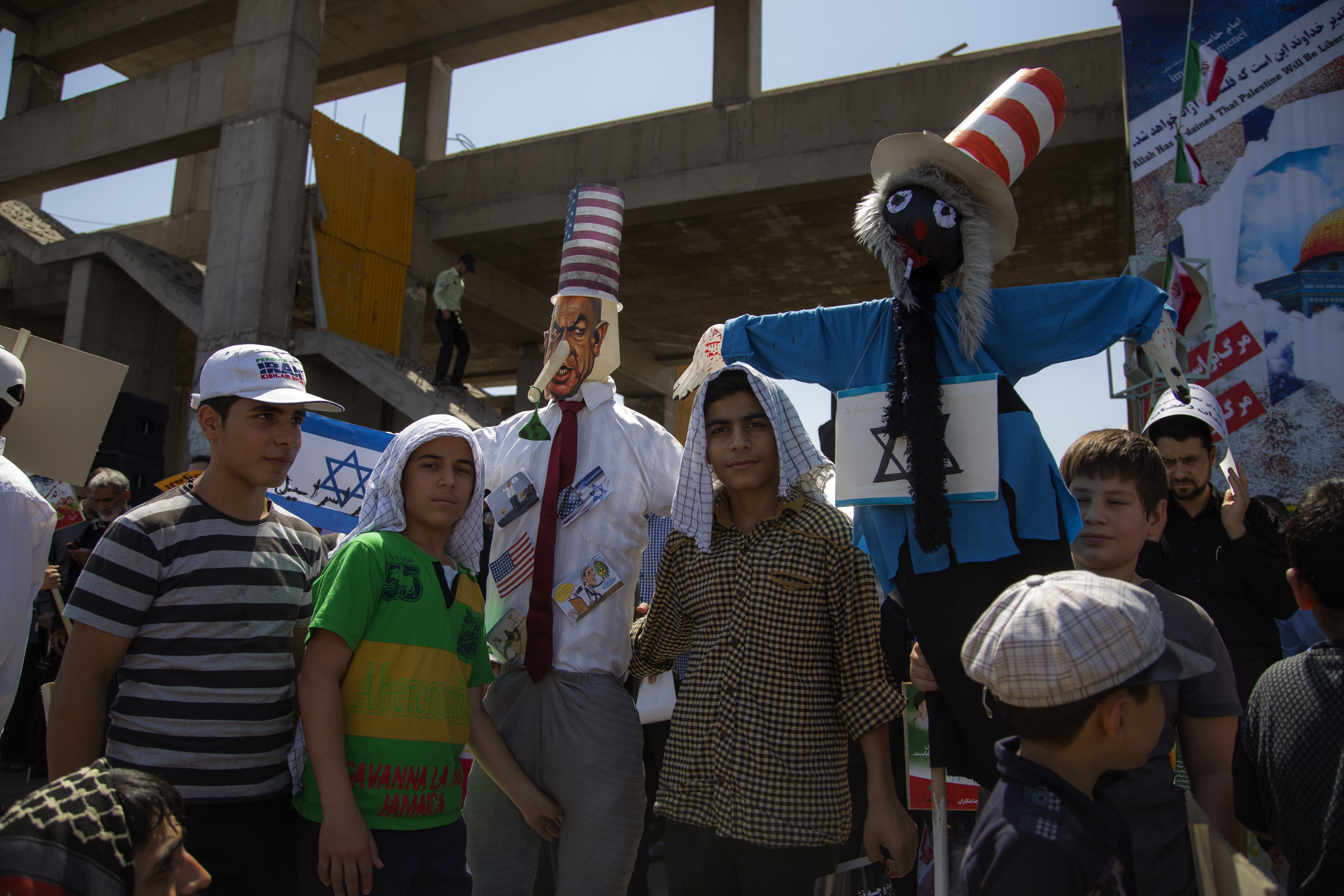
Children posing with an effigy of Israeli Prime Minister Benjamin Netanyahu during a Quds Day parade in Qom (2015)

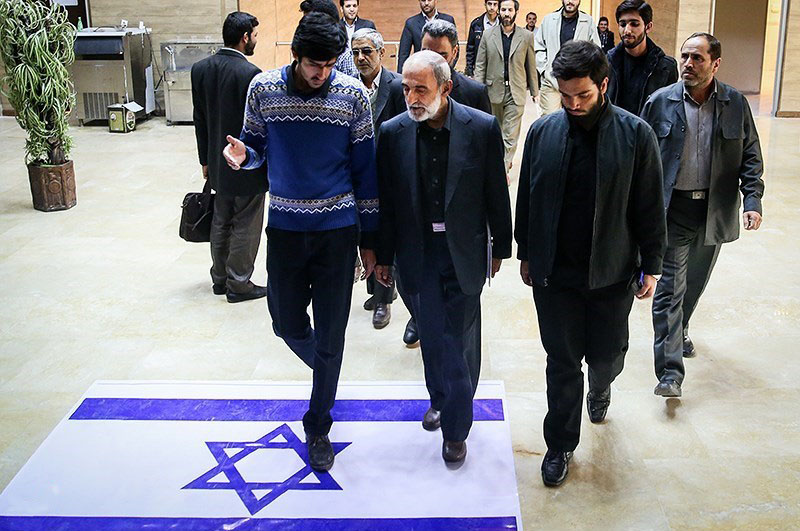
Hossein Shariatmadari, editor of the Iranian newspaper Kayhan, stepping on an Israeli flag at Amirkabir University of Technology (2015)

== Cooperation ==
=== Business ===
After the overthrow of the Mohammad Reza Pahlavi in 1979, most oil companies left Iran and the Iranian government had major difficulties selling oil in the international markets. In the meantime, Marc Rich, an Israeli-Swiss businessman with international ties, began doing business in Iran through his Glencore company headquartered in Switzerland. Rich ignored U.S. and international sanctions on Iran and became the primary trader of Iranian oil for 15 years. He claimed that the oil he bought from Iran was shipped to Israel and both countries were aware of this transaction. Rich provided the Iranian government with weapons and missiles through the Iran–Iraq War. For his actions, the United States government found him guilty of more than 65 counts of criminal offenses including money laundering and violating sanctions on Iran.

In 1998, the Seattle Times reported that pistachio makers in California were unhappy about the fact that Israel imported most of its pistachio from Iran. The head of Iran-China economic room, Asadollah Asgaroladi said in the article that such transactions are easily possible. Based on the article Israel imports only a quarter of pistachios from U.S. and about half of its pistachios from Britain and Germany, whereas these two countries are not producers of pistachio at all and the source is very likely to be from Iran. Furthermore, in 1998 Israeli government punished the Hamama Brothers Co. for illegally importing 105 tonnes of pistachio from Iran. Israeli newspaper Ynet reported in 2007 that U.S. government once again asked the Israeli government to stop importing pistachios from Iran. In 2008 U.S. ambassador to Israel, Richard H. Jones wrote a letter to Israel's finance minister Ronnie Bar-on demanding Israel to stop importing Iranian pistachios from Turkey. Similar reports have been published by Haaretz.

In 1998, Israeli businessman Nahum Manbar was sentenced to 16 years in prison in Israel for doing business with Tehran, and in the course of the investigation, "hundreds of companies" were found to have illegal business dealings with Iran. The fall-out reached the United States as some transactions were alleged to have been part of the Iran–Contra affair. A controversy over Israeli-Iranian business links erupted in mid-2011. Israeli company Ofer Brothers Group was subject to U.S. sanctions after it was revealed that it sold ships to Iran via a third party, and that its ships also docked at Iranian ports. The U.S. government cleared it from the list three months later. In 2006 Israeli newspaper Haaretz reported the Israeli refinery Paz reportedly purchases crude oil coming from Iran. The article reported that the oil from Iran arrives to Israel through a port in Rotterdam. Another article in Haaretz in the same year reported that the Israeli energy minister Benjamin Ben Eliezer said: "Every attempted contact with an enemy state that serves Israeli business and economic interests, strengthens the stability of the region." And the Israeli foreign ministry said that it was not their business to look into the sources of oil.

Ynet reported that Israeli–Iranian trade, conducted covertly and illegally by dozens of Israeli companies, totals tens of millions of dollars a year. Much of this trade is conducted through a third country. Israel supplies Iran with fertilizer, irrigation pipes, hormones for milk production, seeds, and fruit; Iran, meanwhile, provides Israel with marble, cashews, and pistachios.

In April 2009 a large batch of oranges carrying stickers of an Israeli company were distributed in the Iranian market. Based on the investigations the oranges were imported from Dubai. In December 2011 Bloomberg reported that most of the filtering equipment currently in use in Iran were bought from an Israeli company called Allot Communications. The system called NetEnforcer allows the government to monitor any device that is connected to the internet. The devices were shipped to Denmark, where the original packaging was removed and replaced with fake labels. Al-Monitor reported in 2013 that the Iranian government asked Israeli experts to visit the earthquake stricken areas in the province of Sistan in 2006. Based on the report the Israeli experts spent the passover of 2006 in Iran.

=== Military relations ===
==== Pre-revolution ====
Israel was involved in the arming of Iran during the Pahlavi dynasty:

- Project "Flower" Tzur (see also Project Flower), a joint collaboration between Iran and Israel, aimed to develop a "state-of-the-art sea-to-sea missile, an advanced version of the U.S. Harpoon missile, with a range of 200 kilometers".
- Israeli Defense Minister General Ezer Weizmann and Iranian Vice Minister of War General Hassan Toufanian discussed the co-production of Israel's Jericho-2 missile, code named Project Flower.

==== Khomeini era ====
The Observer estimated that Israel's arms sales to Iran during the Iran–Iraq War totaled US$500 million annually, and Time reported that throughout 1981 and 1982, "the Israelis reportedly set up Swiss bank accounts to handle the financial end of the deals".

According to the report of the U.S. Congressional Committees Investigating the Iran–Contra affair issued in November 1987, "the sale of U.S. arms to Iran through Israel began in the summer of 1985, after receiving the approval of President Reagan". These sales included "2,008 TOW missiles and 235 parts kits for Hawk missiles had been sent to Iran via Israel". Further shipments of up to US$2 billion of American weapons from Israel to Iran consisting of 18 F-4 fighter-bombers, 46 Skyhawk fighter-bombers, and nearly 4,000 missiles were foiled by the U.S. Department of Justice, and "unverified reports alleged that Israel agreed to sell Iran Sidewinder air-to-air missiles, radar equipment, mortar and machinegun ammunition, field telephones, M-60 tank engines and artillery shells, and spare parts for C-130 transport planes". Israeli arms deals to Iran continued after the Iran–Iraq War, although sporadically and unofficially.

=== Travel ===
The Islamic Republic of Iran does not usually issue visas to Israeli passport holders or citizens of other countries who have an entry stamp for Israel in their passports.

Iranian citizens need to obtain special permission from the Israeli government to enter Israel. This permission is granted on a case-by-case basis and after security checks.

In the past few years, to solve the problem of the entry stamp for Israel in the passport, the entry stamp is not placed in the passport but on another sheet so that those traveling to Israel do not have problems traveling to other countries.

== Disputed issues ==
=== Iranian funding of Hamas and Hezbollah ===
Iran provides political and financial support and weapons to Hamas, an organization committed to the destruction of Israel by Jihad. According to Mahmoud Abbas, President of the Palestinian National Authority: "Hamas is funded by Iran. It claims it is financed by donations, but the donations are nothing like what it receives from Iran."

Iran has also provided support to Hezbollah, another enemy of Israel, with substantial amounts of funding, training, weapons, explosives, political, diplomatic, and organizational aid while persuading Hezbollah to take an action against Israel. Hezbollah's 1985 manifesto listed its four main goals as "Israel's final departure from Lebanon as a prelude to its final obliteration" According to reports released in February 2010, Hezbollah received $400 million from Iran.

=== Nuclear program of Iran ===
==== Iran threatening Israel ====
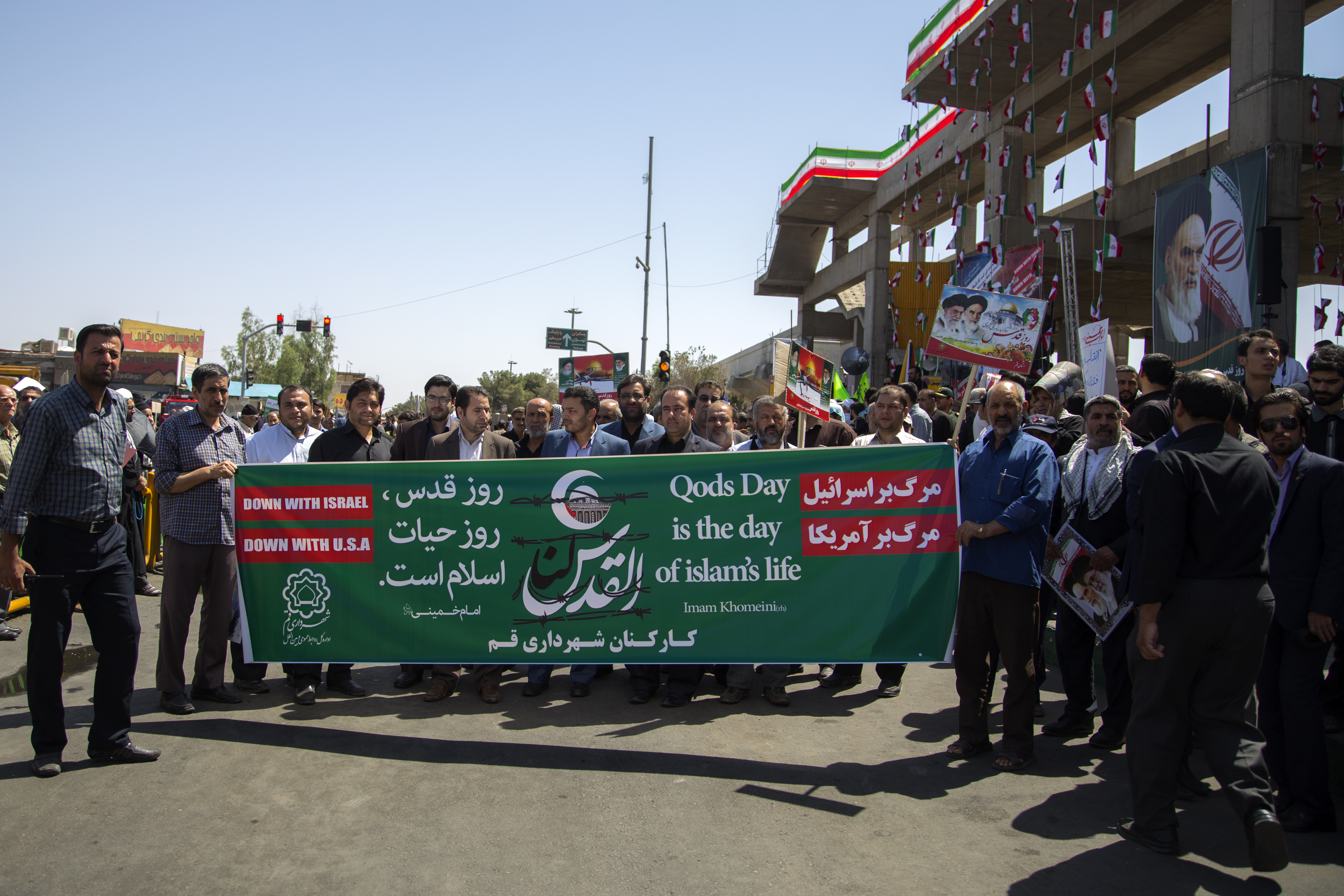
Quds Day demonstration in Qom, Iran

The nuclear program of Iran with its potential to develop nuclear weapons, together with the anti-Israel rhetoric of the President, Mahmoud Ahmadinejad, and his desire for "the regime occupying Jerusalem" to "vanish from the pages of time", has led many Israelis to expect an eventual attack from Iran.

In May 2012, Iran's Military Chief of Staff declared: "The Iranian nation is standing for its cause and that is the full annihilation of Israel."

In August 2012, Brigadier General Gholam Reza Jalali, who heads Iran's Passive Defense Organization, said ahead of Al-Quds Day that Israel must be destroyed, saying: "[Al-Quds Day] is a reflection of the fact that no other way exists apart from resolve and strength to completely eliminate the aggressive nature and to destroy Israel."

In August 2012, a senior cleric and Tehran's provisional Friday Prayers Leader Ayatollah Ahmad Khatami, speaking about Qods Day, said the spread of the "Islamic Awakening" in the Middle East "heralds annihilation of the Zionist regime".

Iran's repeated threats against Israel, particularly in 2012, led Canada, an ally of Israel, to close its embassy in Iran on 7 September 2012, and give Iranian diplomats five days to leave.

On 21 September 2012, at a military parade in Iran to mark the beginning of the Iran–Iraq War, and in which a new air defense system was unveiled, Amir Ali Hajizadeh, the Iranian air force chief, said that should a conflict between Iran and Israel break out, Israel would "manage the beginning of the war, but the response and end would be in our hands, in which case the Zionist entity would cease to exist. The number of missiles launched would be more than the Zionists could imagine."

On 22 September 2012, General Mohammad Ali Jafari, the commander of the Iranian Revolutionary Guards, said that eventually a war with Israel would break out, during which Iran would eradicate Israel, which he referred to as a "cancerous tumor".

On 23 September 2012, Hajizadeh threatened to attack Israel and trigger World War III, saying that "it is possible that we will make a pre-emptive attack" which would "turn into World War III". He threatened to attack American bases in the Middle East as well, and said that as a result of this attack, Israel would "sustain heavy damage and that will be a prelude to its obliteration". On the same day, Deputy Commander of the Iranian Revolutionary Guards Brigadier General Hossein Salami said that while Iran isn't concerned by Israeli "threats" to strike Iranian nuclear facilities, such an attack would be "a historic opportunity for the Islamic Revolution to wipe them off the world's geographic history".

On 2 October 2012, Hojjat al-Eslam Ali Shirazi, the representative of Supreme Leader Ayatollah Ali Khamenei to the Iranian Qods Force, alleged that Iran required only "24 hours and an excuse" in order to eradicate Israel. Shirazi alleged that Israel was "close to annihilation" and sought to attack Iran out of desperation.

Iran's actions, nuclear program, and threats have been viewed by Gregory Stanton, the founder and director of Genocide Watch, as having taken six of eight steps on the "path to genocide". He urged the international community to take action against Iran and to isolate it, in order to "curb its genocidal intent". He said "one of the best predictors of genocide is incitement to genocide" and that believes this is "exactly what Iran is doing today". Incitement to genocide is a crime under international law. He stressed that it is important not to dismiss "the early signs" as "diabolical rhetoric or as a tactic meant to advance a different goal", and doing so would "enable the perpetrators". He said Iran has classified and symbolized Israel via hate speech and an ideology of exclusion, and has dehumanized Israel by portraying potential victim as "cancer" that should be wiped out. In addition, Stanton said that Iran has organized "fanatical militas", such as the Islamic Revolutionary Guard Corps, while stifling dissent in Iranian society. He added that by denying a previous genocide, the Holocaust, by working on weapons of mass destruction, and through global terrorism, Iran has prepared for genocide.

In January 2013, Iran warned that any Israeli attack on Syria would be treated the same as an attack on Iran. After Israel attacked Syria, Iran simply stated that Israel would "regret this recent aggression".

In March 2015, the commander of the Basij militia of Iran's Revolutionary Guards said that "erasing Israel off the map is not negotiable".

On 6 June 2023, IRGC unveiled Fattah (missile), an Iranian hypersonic medium-range ballistic missile with a range of 1400 km and a terminal speed of Mach 13–15. Iran also claimed that this missile can strike Israel within 400 seconds and avoid the most advanced anti-ballistic missile systems of the United States and Israel, including Israel's Iron Dome.

==== Israel threatening Iran ====
In November 2003 a Scottish newspaper claimed that Israel "warned that it is prepared to take unilateral military action against Iran if the international community fails to stop any development of nuclear weapons at the country's atomic energy facilities". It cited then Israeli defence minister Shaul Mofaz stating "under no circumstances would Israel be able to tolerate nuclear weapons in Iranian possession". In December 2005, a British newspaper claimed that the Israeli military had been ordered by then Israeli Prime Minister Ariel Sharon to plan for possible strikes on uranium enrichment sites in Iran in March 2006, based on Israeli intelligence estimates that Iran would be able to build nuclear weapons in two to four years. It was claimed that the special forces command was in the highest stage of readiness for an attack (state G) in December of the following year. Ariel Sharon reportedly said, "Israel – and not only Israel – cannot accept a nuclear Iran. We have the ability to deal with this and we're making all the necessary preparations to be ready for such a situation." Israeli military Chief of Staff, Dan Halutz, answered how far Israel was ready to go to stop Iran's nuclear energy program: "Two thousand kilometers." Seymour Hersh says U.S. Department of Defense civilians led by Douglas Feith have been working with Israeli planners and consultants to develop and refine potential nuclear, chemical-weapons, and missile targets inside Iran.

On 8 May 2006, then Israeli Vice Premier Shimon Peres said in an interview with Reuters that "the president of Iran should remember that Iran can also be wiped off the map", Army Radio reported. Peres, a Nobel Peace Prize laureate, drew unusually stiff criticism from an analyst on Israel's state television, Yoav Limor, for talking of destroying another country. In May 2006, IDF Chief of Staff Dan Halutz stated that Iran's nuclear facilities can be destroyed, hinting at a possible plan to do just that. In September 2007, Israel repeated its policy concerning the development of nuclear capacity by its potential enemies. Shabtai Shavit, a former chief of the Mossad, said Iranian atomic facilities could be destroyed within a year, but has not ruled out going that direction. Isaac Ben-Israel, a former general of the Israeli Air Force, said an attack could be carried out at any time but only as a last resort. Iran's Shahab-3 missile exercises were conducted in early July demonstrating that Israel was within reach.

According to the New York Times, Israel sought help from the United States for a military attack against Iran. Israel reportedly asked for bunker-busting bombs for an attack on Iran's main nuclear complex and for permission to fly over Iraq to reach Iran's major nuclear complex at Natanz. The Bush administration rejected the requests. According to the article, White House officials never conclusively determined whether Israel had decided to go ahead with the strike before the United States protested, or whether Prime Minister Ehud Olmert of Israel was trying to goad the White House into more decisive action before President Bush left office.

On 27 July 2009, Israel's Defence Minister Ehud Barak during a press conference with Robert Gates, the U.S. Defense Secretary, in Jerusalem, warned Iran that a military strike on its nuclear facilities was still an option: "We clearly believe that no option should be removed from the table. This is our policy; we mean it. We recommend to others to take the same position, but we cannot dictate it to anyone." The same day, Israel's Ambassador to US, Gabriela Shalev, during a special UN Security Council session held to discuss the situation in the Middle East, called Iran the "biggest supporter of terrorism. The Islamic Republic's nuclear program and its support of terrorism pose a threat to the entire Middle East."

In 2010, Gabi Ashkenazi and Meir Dagan balked at Benjamin Netanyahu's preparations for a strike on Iran.

On 5 November 2012, Israel's Prime Minister Benjamin Netanyahu reiterated his willingness to mount a unilateral attack on Iran's nuclear facilities even without U.S. support.

In 2013, retiring defense minister Ehud Barak said that though it would be very difficult for Israel to operate alone, that Obama had ordered the Pentagon to prepare detailed plans for an American strike on Iran.

Netanyahu said in September 2013 that President Hassan Rouhani is trying to acquire a nuclear weapon, and that his perception as a moderate makes him a "wolf in sheep's clothing".

In January 2014, during a plenary session at the 9th World Economic Forum in Davos Switzerland, the President of Israel Shimon Peres said in response to a question about the threat of Iran's nuclear program that "Iran is not an enemy", and there are no historical hostilities between the two countries. In that regard he added: "I don't see a reason to spend so much money in the name of hatred".

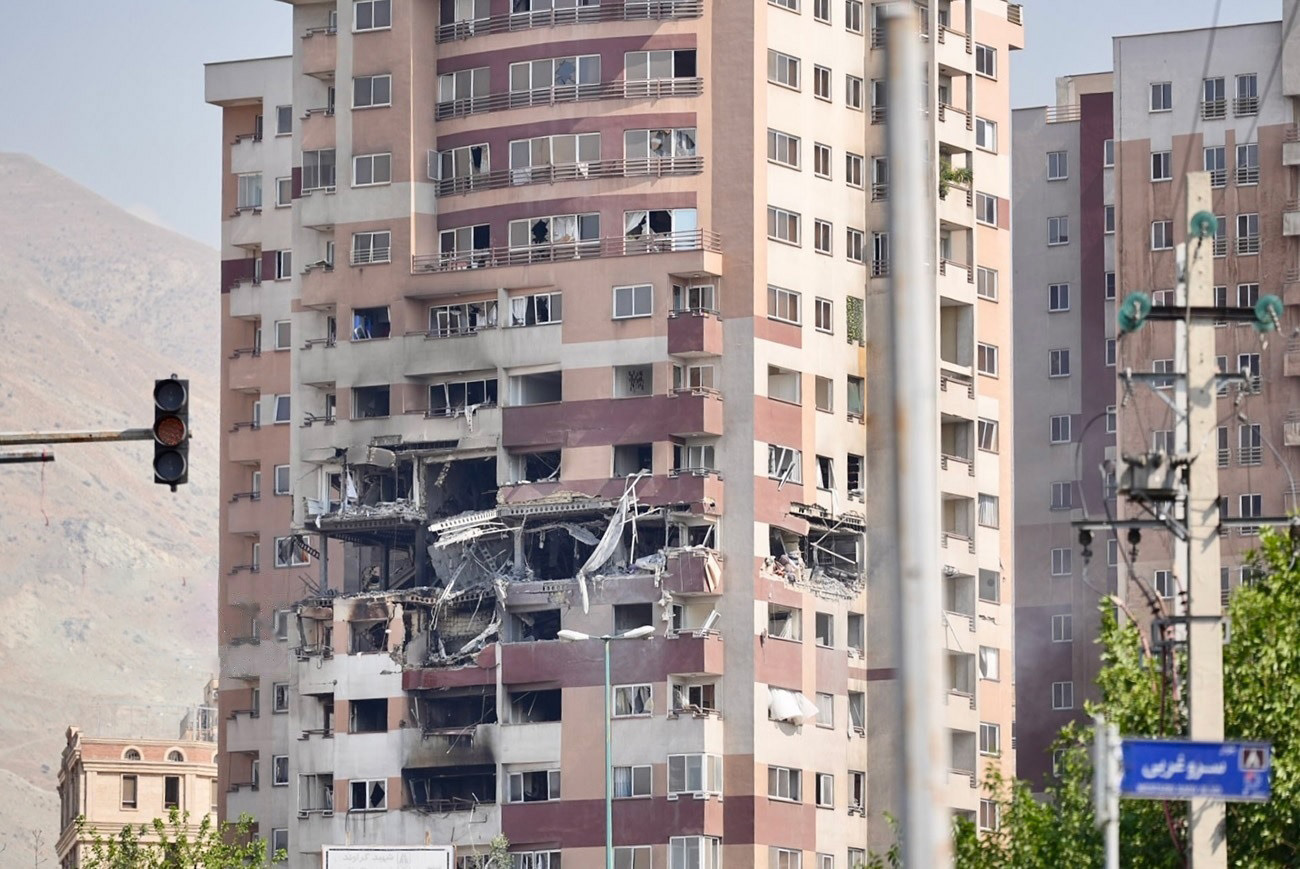
Residential building in Tehran damaged during Israeli strikes on Iran, 13 June 2025

In May 2018, it was revealed that Prime Minister Netanyahu had ordered the Mossad and military in 2011 to prepare for an attack on Iran within 15 days of receiving the order. According to Mossad chief Tamir Pardo, Netanyahu backed off after he and Chief of Staff Benny Gantz questioned Netanyahu's legal right to give such an order without Cabinet approval.

On 29 May 2022, Israeli Prime Minister warned that Iran will not go unpunished for inspiring assaults through its proxies.

On 27 June 2022, Israeli Defense Minister Benny Gantz indicated that Israel will cooperate with world powers to influence any agreement that might result from Iran's nuclear negotiations.

==== Speculation ====
On 26 May 2006, then Russian Defense Minister Sergei Ivanov reiterated Moscow's commitment to supply Iran with sophisticated anti-aircraft missiles. Lockheed Martin Executive Vice President of F-35 Program Integration Tom Burbage indicated that once Israel has the F-35 it need not fear the S-300.

In June 2008, Israel conducted a major military exercise that American officials speculated might be training for a bombing attack on Iran. A senior Pentagon official said one of the goals of the exercise was to send a clear message to the United States and other countries that Israel was prepared to act militarily: "They wanted us to know, they wanted the Europeans to know, and they wanted the Iranians to know", the Pentagon official said. "There's a lot of signaling going on at different levels."

The Bush administration did agree to sell a thousand GBU-39 standoff bunker penetrating bombs to Israel, but a strike against Natanz would require hundreds of these bombs.

In a 2009 interview, American diplomat John Bolton argued that the Iran–Israel relationship had deteriorated to the point that it might be "wise" for Israel to preemptively attack Iran's nuclear research facilities. To destroy the facilities, while not a permanent solution to ending Iran's nuclear ambitions, he argued, might delay the progress of Iranian nuclear research for long enough that regime change could occur before the development of a nuclear weapon took place. He cited as an example the case of the apartheid government of South Africa, which renounced its efforts to pursue nuclear weapons after Nelson Mandela's government came to power.

In April 2009, Army General David Petraeus said "the Israeli government may ultimately see itself so threatened by the prospect of an Iranian nuclear weapon that it would take preemptive military action to derail or delay it". On 17 September 2009, Ze'ev Elkin said that the delivery by Russia of S-300 missiles may prompt Israel to strike Iran. In June 2010 Russia voted for UN sanctions to prevent the S-300 missile sale.

Iran consistently claimed that its nuclear program is purely for civilian purposes, and that it has no intention of ever utilizing its peaceful nuclear program to develop nuclear weapons. During the course of Iran's recent history, specifically during the Iran-Iraq war, Iran has experienced significant outages of its commercial electricity grid. Iran has also continuously claimed that it intends to ultimately export part of the electricity produced by its nuclear reactors to its regional neighbors, as a way of diversifying its mainly oil-based economy to more diversified revenue streams.

German Defense Minister Thomas de Maiziere said in 2012 that an Israeli attack would be unlikely to succeed.

==== Iran responding to Israeli threats ====
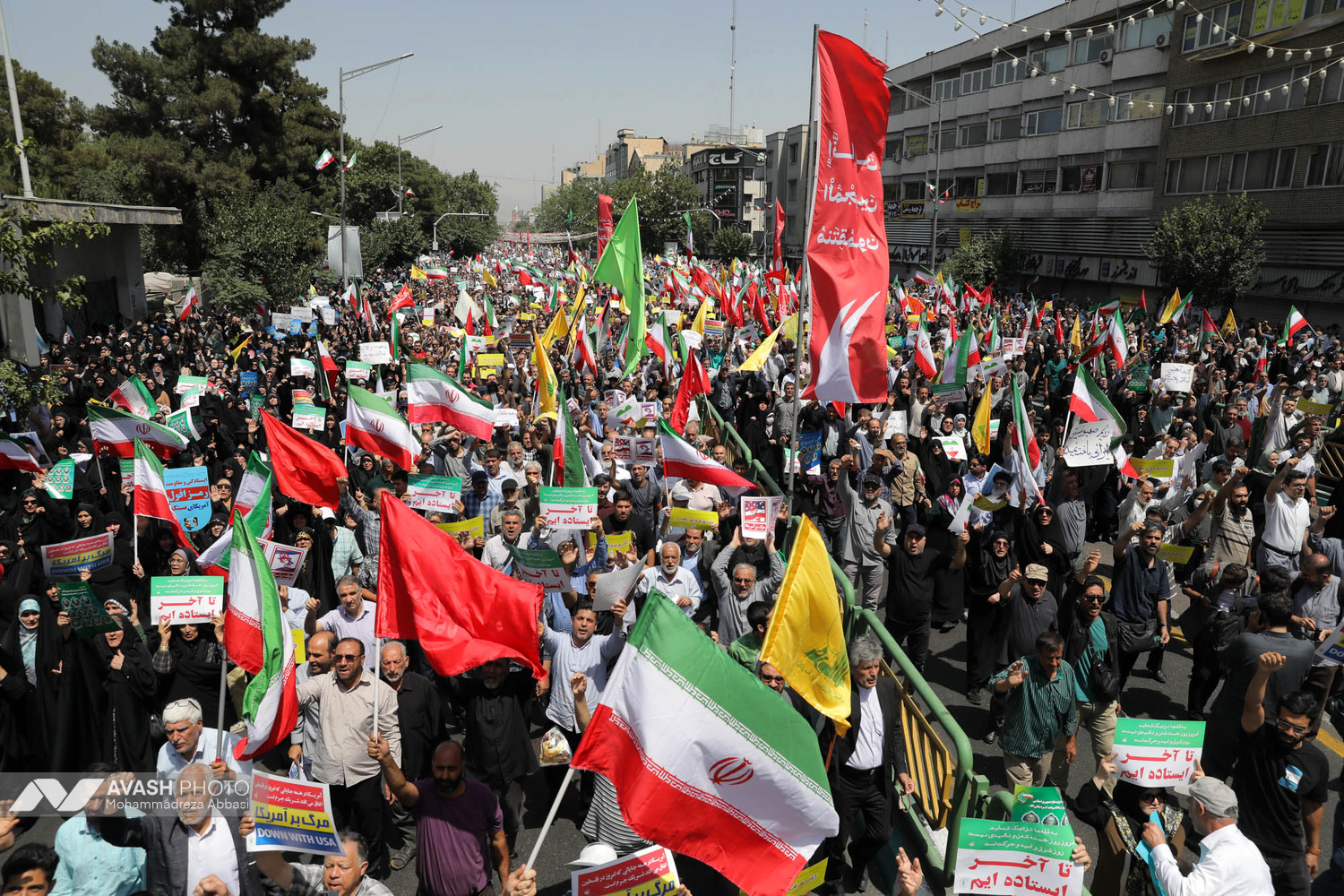
Protest in Tehran against Israeli strikes on Iran, 20 June 2025

Iran's former foreign minister, Manouchehr Mottaki declared that Israel was not capable of an attack and still recovering from the 2006 war in Lebanon. The Iranian Chief of the Revolutionary Guards, Mohammad Ali Jafari said Israel was within the reach of Iranian missiles and Iran would close the Strait of Hormuz, cutting off two-fifths of the global oil supply. Iran has the capability to close the Strait of Hormuz or impede traffic for a month or more, and any U.S. attempts to reopen it could escalate the conflict.

On 7 February 2010, Iran's supreme leader Ayatollah Ali Khamenei said the destruction of Israel was assured. According to the Tehran Times, he told Palestinian Islamic Jihad leader Ramadan Abdullah Shallah, "Israel is going downhill toward decline and fall and God willing its obliteration is certain". Khamenei went on to call Israel "a symbol of atrocity, viciousness, and ugliness", and said the West's "support for the Zionist regime is ineffective". Former Iranian President Ahmadinejad's chief of staff, Esfandiar Rahim Mashaei, said that if Israel attacked Iran it would be destroyed within a week.

On 24 June 2022, Iran claimed that Yair Lapid's allegations of an Iranian conspiracy to assassinate Israelis in Istanbul were "ridiculous" and intended to sour relations between Iran and Turkey.

On 15 July 2022, the Iranian military cautioned Israel and the U.S. not to use force against Iran: “The Americans and Zionists know very well the price for using the word 'force against Iran'." State media cited Brigadier General Abolfazl Shekarchi, spokesman for the Iranian armed forces.

In response to Israel's 2025 attack on Iran, Iranian diplomats have denied accusations that Iran presents an "existential threat" to Israel, stating that any action they take is a defensive response to Israeli attacks, and criticising the Israeli concept of "pre-emptive self-defence".

== Iranian public opinion toward Israel ==
According to a 2008 international public opinion survey conducted by WorldPublicOpinion (WPO), 63 percent of Iranian respondents favored their government supporting the Palestinian side, while 18 percent preferred that Iran take neither side, and only 3 percent supported taking Israel’s side. The poll was carried out by WPO, a collaborative research project involving research centers across multiple countries and managed by the Program on International Policy Attitudes (PIPA) at the University of Maryland.

In May 2014, the BBC News reported on the results of an opinion survey on attitudes toward Jewish people in the Middle East and North Africa. The poll, commissioned by the U.S.-based Anti-Defamation League (ADL), found that among the countries surveyed (excluding Israel), respondents in Iran registered the lowest level of negative attitudes toward Jews, with 56% expressing such views, compared with higher percentages in other regional states.

In October 2024, Stasis, a Washington-based organization focused on statistics related to Iran and its civil society, found out that, when asked about the statement "Iran should normalize its relationship with Israel", 64% answered "Completely disagree", 19% "Completely agree", 6% "Somewhat agree", 3% "Somewhat disagree" and 8% "I don't know" or refused to answer.

In October 2025, the GAMAAN Institute published its latest report on the 12-day war. According to the findings, a clear majority of the Iranian respondents (69%) believed that “the Islamic Republic should stop calling for the destruction of Israel,” while 20% disagreed. In terms of country favorability measured in the survey, Israel ranked second after the United States, receiving 39% positive and 48% negative views. GAMAAN surveys however are criticized even by opponents of the Islamic Republic, as they use self-selecting participants reached through social media and chain referrals, and for being unrepresentative of rural, elderly, and lower-income populations.

In December 2025, University of Maryland's School of Public Policy released a report, Iranian Public Opinion Soon After the Twelve-Day War, in the context of the Iran–Israel war in June 2025, attitudes toward Israel were predominantly negative, with large majorities attributing hostile intentions to Israeli actions. A total of 84% of respondents said that Israel began the war in an attempt to provoke regime change in Iran, and the most widely accepted explanation for the conflict was that Israel sought to weaken Iran’s government and military in the hope of triggering a rebellion, a view endorsed by 84% overall (50% describing this as "definitely a reason" and 34% as "probably a reason").

== See also ==
- Iran US relations
- Foreign relations of Iran
- Foreign relations of Israel
- History of the Jews in Iran
- Iranian Jews in Israel
