= Project Flower =

Joint military project between Iran and Israel

- Date: July 18, 1977 – February 11, 1979
- Executed by: Israel; Iran

Project Flower was a joint Israeli-Iranian military effort to develop advanced missile systems. It was one of six oil-for-arms contracts that the countries signed in April 1977.

== History ==
In the mid-1970s, Iran sought to expand its missile capability, including through cooperation with Israel with whom it had tacit military economic and intelligence cooperation at the time. In April 1977, six oil-for-arms contracts were signed, among them Project Flower. On 18 July 1977, Iranian Vice Minister of War General Hassan Toufanian traveled in secret to Israel where he met with Israeli Foreign Minister Moshe Dayan and Minister of Defense Ezer Weizmann. Iranian concerns over missile and nuclear developments in India and Pakistan were also discussed.

This project focused on the development of a longer range Gabriel anti-ship missile and a future submarine-launched variant, and intended to reproduce an American-designed missile with Israeli-made parts that could be fitted with nuclear warheads. The missile incorporated American navigation and guidance equipment.

The following year, Iran supplied Israel with $280 million worth of oil as a down payment. A team of Iranian experts began construction of a missile assembly facility near Sirjan, in south central Iran, and a missile test range near Rafsanjan

On 11 February 1979, the monarchy of Mohammed Reza Pahlavi was overthrown in the Iranian Revolution, and Project Flower ended. The Israeli engineers and defense officials returned to Israel and all the blueprints and diagrams of the weapons systems were sent back via diplomatic courier.

Yaakov Shapiro, the Defense Ministry official in charge of coordinating the negotiations with Iran from 1975 to 1978, recalls: "In Iran they treated us like kings. We did business with them on a stunning scale. Without the ties with Iran, we would not have had the money to develop weaponry that is today in the front line of the defense of the State of Israel."

== Israel's Secret War in Iran book ==
Three decades after the overthrow of the Pahlavi and the closure of the project, a book titled "Israel's Secret War in Iran" was published by Ronen Bergman, a senior political and military analyst for Yedioth Ahronoth, Israel's largest paid newspaper. Bergman had a conversation with a Senior official in the Israeli Ministry of Defense who worked during this project.

While Pahlavi's authorities were happy with this project and its advancement away from the eyes of the US in their view, Israel had carefully duped Pahlavi to secure its interests. According to Israel's plan, during this project, contrary to what Iran's top officials think, Iran would only achieve obsolete technology.

== See also ==
- Iranian military industry
- Iran–Israel relations
- Iran's missile forces
- Israel Defense Forces
