= Hassan Toufanian =

Iranian air force general (1913–1998)

Timsar Hassan Toufanian
- حسن طوفانیان
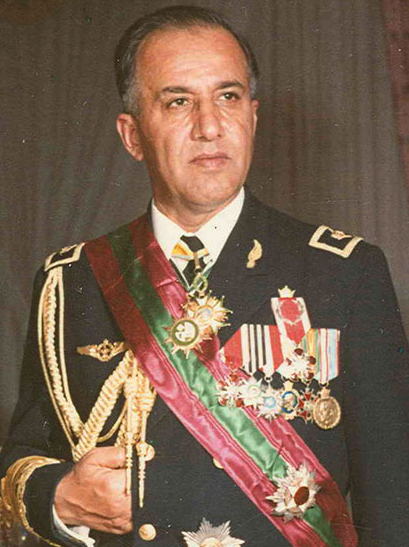
- General Toufanian, c. 1970s

Deputy Minister of War
- In office 1973–1979
- Monarch: Mohammad Reza Pahlavi
- Prime Minister: Amir-Abbas Hoveyda; Jamshid Amouzegar; Jafar Sharif-Emami; Gholam Reza Azhari; Shapour Bakhtiar
- Preceded by: ?
- Succeeded by: Ezatollah Nooraei

Head of the Military Industries Organization
- In office 1973 – 11 February 1979
- Monarch: Mohammad Reza Pahlavi
- Prime Minister: Amir-Abbas Hoveyda; Jamshid Amouzegar; Jafar Sharif-Emami; Gholam Reza Azhari; Shapour Bakhtiar

Head of the Office of Foreign Purchases and Orders
- In office 1973–1979
- Monarch: Mohammad Reza Pahlavi
- Prime Minister: Amir-Abbas Hoveyda; Jamshid Amouzegar; Jafar Sharif-Emami; Gholam Reza Azhari; Shapour Bakhtiar

Director of the 4th bureau
- In office 1966–1973
- Monarch: Mohammad Reza Pahlavi
- Prime Minister: Amir-Abbas Hoveyda

Personal details
- Born: 20 July 1913 Tehran, Qajar Iran
- Died: 28 August 1998 (aged 85) Chevy Chase, Maryland, United States
- Spouse: Fatemeh Zerehi
- Relations: Mehdi Khayat (father); Ameneh Ali-Arab (mother)
- Children: 6
- Education: Officers' School

Military service
- Allegiance: Pahlavi Iran
- Branch/service: Air Force
- Years of service: 1934–1979
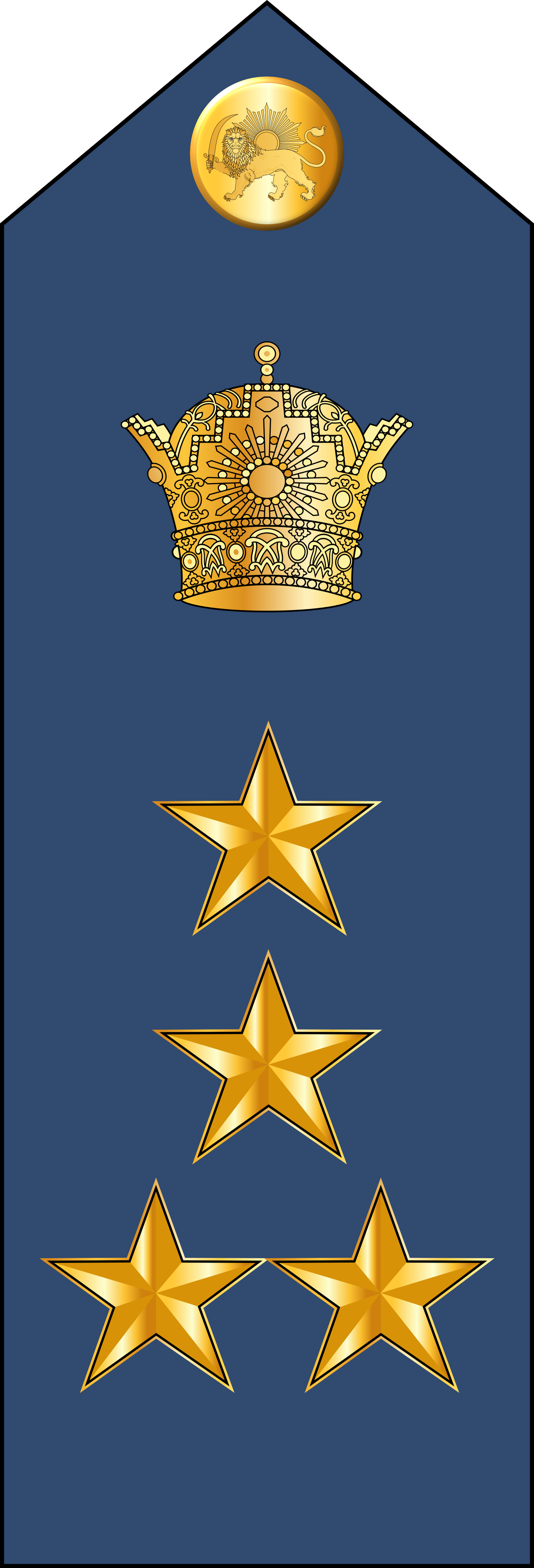
- Rank: General

Hassan Toufanian (Persian: حسن طوفانیان; 20 July 1913 – 28 August 1998) was an Iranian Air Force General under the Mohammad Reza Pahlavi. He was a graduate of the Iranian Military Academy and later served as commanding officer of Iran's flight academy. In 1977 he was the Shah's Vice Minister of War and led Project Flower, which entailed an economic deal between Iran and Israel which would have built cooperation and exchanged Iranian oil for an Israeli missile system, but which collapsed in 1979 during the Iranian Revolution.

== Early life ==
General Toufanian was born in Tehran. His father was a tailor. Toufanian was the oldest of five sons and two daughters. He graduated from Dar al-Funun in high school and briefly attended a small medical school before pursuing a career in the air force. He received a military commission in 1936. After graduating from the academy, Toufanian married Fatemeh Zerehi and they had four sons and two daughters.

== Career ==
Before World War II, General Toufanian worked in an airplane assembly factory as a test pilot. During the 1940s, he also spent 18 months in England. from 1950 to 1952 he attended military training in the United States. He claimed no role in the August 1953 Iranian coup d'état, but was a pilot involved in escorting the Shah's return at its end. He then worked as a teacher at the Officers Academy. By the end of the 1950s, he was the head of the Joint Chiefs of Staff's Office of Planning. He was involved in designing defense against perceived threats from the Soviet Union and Iraq. This duty brought him closer to the Shah, and in 1961 he was named one of the shah's special adjutants, responsible for notifying the shah in his quarters if an emergency arose during off house.

In 1963, Toufanian became arms purchaser for the Iranian Armed Forces. In this role, Toufanian was involved in many deals, during which he received kickbacks and became quite wealthy. He also became undersecretary in the Ministry of War and the director of Iran's main military industrial corporation. During his tenure he continued to deal with the procurement of arms whereas Reza Azimi, minister of war, focused on budgetary and legislative affairs. Toufanian hired promising officers and scientists to run the organization and its Research and Development Department, greatly improving the efficiency of the cooperation. Under his supervision, the military saw success reverse engineering weapons technologies and licensing agreements with Western companies. Although a member of the Shah's inner circle, Toufanian worked with the CIA as an informant.

Toufanian also served as the deputy defense minister in the cabinet led by General Gholam Reza Azhari. However, Amir Hossein Rabii and Toufanian did not cooperate with Azhari arguing that the cabinet members were mostly army officers. In addition, both Toufanian and Rabii tended to carry out a coup to stabilize the turmoil in the country. Their idea was not backed by other senior military officials, including General Abbas Gharabaghi.

=== Project Flower and Iranian Revolution ===
In 1977 General Toufanian traveled to Israel and negotiated a multi-billion-dollar exchange of oil for Israeli Jericho missiles. He was also involved in a separate project named Tzier which sought to increase the range of Iran's own missiles using Israeli technology. In February 1979, the monarchy of Shah Mohammed Reza Pahlavi was overthrown in the Iranian Revolution, and Project Flower ended. In the early days of the Revolution, Toufanian was announced to have been arrested, but was escaped from prison in a secret deal, going into hiding in Tehran for nine months.

== Later years and death ==
General Toufanian eventually moved to the United States where he lived the rest of his life in exile. He settled in Chevy Chase, Maryland, which is in the Washington, D.C. suburbs. He died of prostate cancer in 1998.
