= Operation True Promise =

Operation True Promise or Operation Truthful Promise (Arabic: عَمَلِيَّةُ الوَعْدِ الصَّادِق, romanized: ‘Amaliyyatu al-Wa‘di al-Ṣādiq; Persian: عملیات وعده صادق, romanized: ‘Amaliyati Va‘de-ye Sādeq) refers to several different military operations against Israel:

- Operation True Promise, Hezbollah's name for its 2006 cross-border raid
- Operation True Promise I, April 2024 Iranian strikes on Israel
- Operation True Promise II, October 2024 Iranian strikes on Israel
- Operation True Promise III, Iran's name for the 2025 Twelve-Day War
- Operation True Promise IV, Iran's name for its response to the 2026 Iran war

== See also ==
- Iran–Israel conflict
