= Elahe Hesari =

Iranian actress (born 1983)

- الهه حصاری
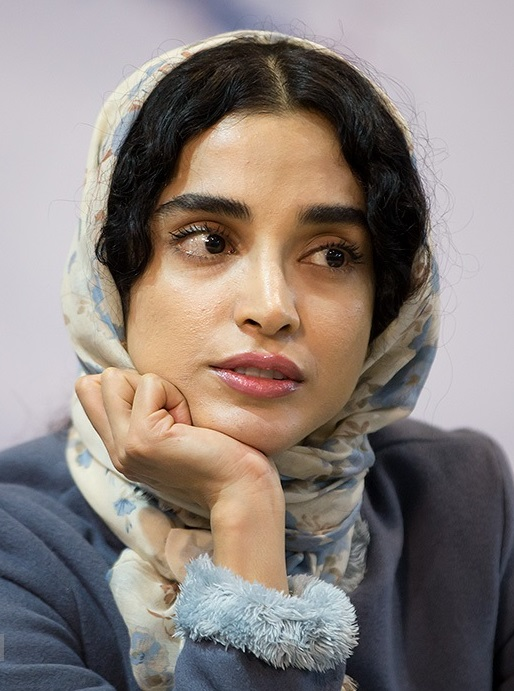
- Hesari at the 2017 Fajr Film Festival
- Born: 9 August 1983 (age 42); Qazvin, Iran
- Occupation: Actress
- Years active: 2007–present

Elahe Hesari (Persian: الهه حصاری; born August 9, 1983) is an Iranian actress. She has received various accolades, including nominations for two Hafez Awards. She won the Best Actress Award at the 9th Eurasia International Film Festival for Don't Worry Sarah (2013).

== Career ==
Elahe Hesari was born in 1983 in Qazvin. She is a graduate in English language and literature as well as in physical education. In high school, she was an active member of school theater groups and later attended acting classes at the "Culture and Art Institute of Everlasting Figures". Keenly interested in acting, Hesari soon found her way into the world of professional acting through her acquaintance with the director Ebrahim Vahidzadeh. Her debut film was Tāksi-ye Nārenji (تاکسی نارنجی, lit. The Orange Taxi (2008)), directed by Vahidzadeh. Hesari also appeared in Notfe-ye Shoom (نطفهٔ شوم, lit. The Ominous Sperm), directed by Karim Atashi, the same year.

Among Hesari's merits mention should be made of winning the Best Female Performance Award at the 9th Eurasia International Film Festival, Almaty, Kazakhstan, in 2013.

== Filmography ==
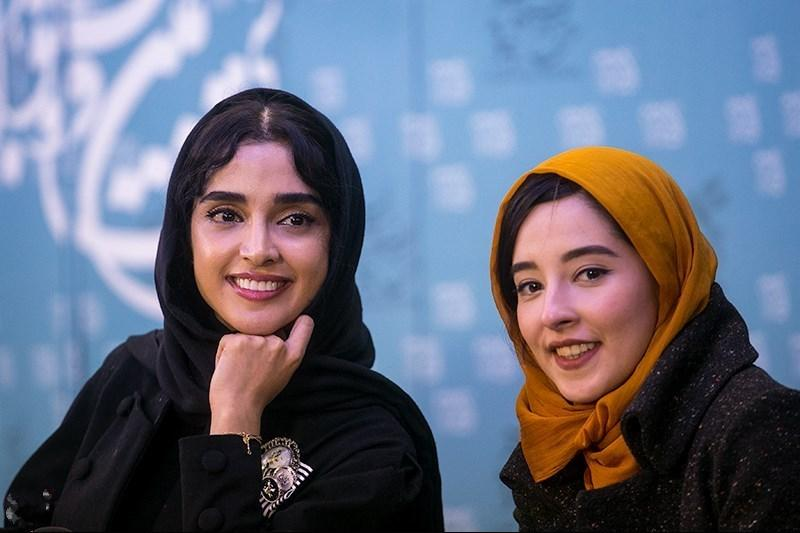
Elahe Hesari (left) and Behafarid Ghafarian (right), at the press conference of Sophie & The Mad, 2012

=== Film ===
- Fossil (Karim Amini), 2023
- Tarāneh (Mehdi Sahebi), 2017
- Crocodile (Masood Takavar, 2017)
- Highlight (Asghar Naeemi, 2017)
- Bāzdam (Arash Sanjabi, 2016)
- Sophie and the beast (Mehdi Karampour, 2016)
- Māhgereftegi (Masood Atyābi, 2016)
- P-22 (Hosein Ghasemi Jami, 2014)
- Dāreh sobh misheh (Yalda Jebelli, 2014)
- Naghsh-e negār (Ali Atshani, 2013)
- Bending the Rules (Behnam Behzadi, 2012)
- Negarān nabāsh Sārā (Ali Reza Amini, 2012)
- Entehā-ye khiābān-e hashtom (Alireza Amini, 2011)
- Bitābi-e Bitā (Mehrdad Farid, 2011)
- The Freeway (Abbas Rafei, 2011)
- Zanān-e venoosi, mardān-e merrikhi (Kazem Rastgoftar, 2010)
- Zanhā shegeftangiz-and (Mehrdad Farid, 2010)
- Aroosak (Ebrahim Vahidzadeh, 2009)
- Notfe-ye shoom
- Tāksi-ye nārenji (Ebrahim Vahidzadeh, 2008)

=== Web ===
Year	Title	Role	Director	Platform
2012	Icy Heart 3		Saman Moghadam	Video CD
2014	I'm Just Kidding		Mehran Modiri	Video CD
2018–2019	Forbidden	Berkeh Karimi	Amir Pourkian	Video CD
2021–present	Mortal Wound	Kimia	Mohammad Hossein Mahdavian	Filimo

=== Television ===
Year	Title	Role	Director	Network
2016	Eight and a Half Minutes	Yalda	Sharam Shah Hosseini	IRIB TV2

== Awards and nominations ==
Year	Award	Category	Nominated work	Result	Ref.
2017	Hafez Awards	Best Actress – Television Series Drama	Eight and a Half Minutes	Nominated	
2019	Hafez Awards	Best Actress – Television Series Drama	Forbidden	Nominated	
2013	9th Eurasia International Film Festival	Best Actress	Don't Worry Sarah	Won	
