= Soureh International University =

University in Tehran, Iran

Coordinates: 35°42′0.72″N 51°22′13.8″E

- Motto: این فصل را با من بخوان
- Motto in English: Read this Chapter with Me
- Type: Private
- Established: 1994
- President: Dr. Mohammad Hossein Saei
- Students: 4000
- Location: Tehran, Iran
- Website: Official website

Soureh International University (SIU) (Persian: دانشگاه بین‌المللی سوره, romanized: Dânešgâh-e Beyn-ol-melali Sure) formerly known as Soore University is an international nonprofit university located in Tehran, Iran. Soore University was founded in 1994, and it is considered among the top art universities in Iran alongside Tehran University of Art and College of Fine Arts at University of Tehran. Historically, Soore University has been particularly strong in Graphic Design and Cinema among arts.

== History ==
Islamic Art and Thought Sect, the art and humanities department of the Islamic Development Organization began to work independently in the early 1970s in the area of teaching various art courses. Thousands of trainees from different parts of the country got instructed in such art programs by these curriculums and later made use of their educations formally or informally. Its first roots came from the artists working at Hosseiniyeh Ershad, and later other revolutionary artists and theorists, especially Morteza Avini. Many filmmakers, poets, writers, journalists, visual artists, and graphic designers came through that system. During those years, before the establishment of Artistic Sect's academic entity, its main theoretical journal magazine was called Soore, which worked under the editorship of Avini.

At the beginning of the Ali Khamenei's leadership period, he emphasized that committed artists should actively attend and play their roles in a way that is suitable to the comprehensive dimensions of the cultural invasion. Following his words, the Art Department of the organization alongside the Artistic Sect of the Islamic Republic of Iran got determined to set up an academic unit. It was an effort to tend the literature of the Islamic revolution by cultivating the committed and religious alumni. To answer the mentioned policy, Soore Educational Institution, which had been initially created to independently hold the training courses, was formally registered and continued its activity under the title of Soore Higher Education Institution. It got named after the main journal publication of the organization and it chose the site of the confiscated building of the Khorous-Neshan (=Rooster) chewing gum factory as the main building of the university campus. Also, the former office of Mohammad Mosaddegh became the home to the faculty of Architecture.

In 2003, the vice-chancellor of the Art Department of Islamic Advertisement Organization proceeded to establish Soore non-profit higher education institution of the second type. After meeting with the approval of the High Council and consolidating its acts to acknowledge second stage institutions, the Soore non-profit Higher Education Institution of the second stage was promoted to the first stage institute in 1997. Soore higher education institution had two other branches. One in Isfahan which was established in 1996 with two courses in cinema and theatre and the branch of Ardabil which was founded on 17 November 1996 with two programs in architecture at the associate degree and restoration at the bachelors level.

Furthermore, in 2010, after coming to a principle agreement, the Soore Higher Education Institution was converted into a university. In 2012, with the permission of the Ministry of Science, Research and Technology, Soore University managed to hold courses in Cinema and Islamic Architecture at the masters' level. After obtaining the related license in 2013, the higher education programming and development council of the Science Ministry declared for changing the name of Soore Higher Education Institution to Soore University. In 2020, Soore University accepted its founding PhD cohort, in the field of Communication studies and later in 2022, its first cohort, in the field of Comparative Islamic Art History.

Also, for running the programs in Cultural Relations and Advertisement, Media Laws and Media Management at the masters' level, the required arrangements were made, and Soore succeeded to obtain the necessary permissions for holding the courses in Cultural Relations and Advertisement at the masters' level along with Journalism and Public Relations at the bachelors' level in 2006-2007. Since February 2007, university students were taking these three courses. In 2009, Soore managed to run the first course in the Management of Cultural Affairs at the bachelors' level. In the same year, with the permission of the Science Ministry, Soore began to accept university students in some courses without holding the entrance exams. In 2013, the Higher Education Programming and Development office of the Science Ministry declared for running the Management of Public Relations course at the bachelor's level and the courses on Media Management and the Management of the Cultural Programming at the masters' level. In 2025, through a direct proclamation by president Pezeshkian university obtained international status and after changing its statute, it also rebranded the logo and motto by choosing part of a poem by Ali Moalem Damghani as its motto.

Old University Logo (1994–2025)

== Schools and programs ==
=== School of Art ===
The art faculty of Soore University commenced its work as the most significant, the biggest and oldest faculty of Soore University on 28 8th 2006 with the approval of the trustees' board and the board of directors with the aim of dividing the educational and scientific activities in the specialized fields and areas and with the intention of attaining the formal and verified structures of the Science, Research and technology ministry.

=== School of Architecture & Urban Planning ===
The faculty of architecture was founded in 1993 and the aim of establishing this faculty is to ameliorate the cultural components in architecture and introduce and updating the Iranian architecture considering the current needs of the Iranian society and effective steps have been taken towards accomplishing these goals by employing the inside experienced professors and making the relationship with the universities of the other countries.

=== School of Culture & Communication ===
Although the foundation of Soore University was laid based on running art courses and educating creative artists, as the times was passing, the new requirements were revealed to the authorities of the university forcing them to review the goals and policies of the university. Accordingly, the proposal for establishing new courses was posed until an agreement was finally reached to run the journalism and public relations courses for the BA degree and culture communications and propaganda courses in master's degree.

== Notable alumni ==
- Anahita Norouzi, visual artist in Canada
- Azadeh Samadi, actress, winner of Crystal Simorgh; convicted and sentenced to a six-month ban from social media activities, barred from leaving Iran.
- Behafarid Ghafarian, actress
- Elsa Firouz Azar, actress, film and theatre director, and script supervisor, Fajr International Theater Festival winner
- Golnar Servatian, cartoonist and book illustrator
- Hosein Amiri Domari, screenwriter and filmmaker, Crystal Simorgh nominated
- Hossein Molayemi, animation director and designer, Academy Award winner
- Houtan Shakiba, actor, Crystal Simorgh and Hafez Awards winner
- Javad Ezzati, actor and filmmaker, Crystal Simorgh and Hafez Awards winner
- Mahyar Alizadeh, musician, composer, and singer, Barbad Award and Hafez Awards winner
- Majid Barzegar, filmmaker and producer, FIPRESCI Prize winner at Berlin International Film Festival (as producer)
- Majid Habibi, voice actor
- Mehdi Saki, actor, composer, and singer
- Mitra Jashni, visual artist and political activist
- Mojtaba Pirzadeh, actor, Crystal Simorgh nominated
- Mohammad Davoudi, scriptwriter, Crystal Simorgh winner
- Mohammad Hossein Mahdavian, filmmaker, Crystal Simorgh and Hafez Awards winner
- Mohammad Reza Hedayati, actor
- Mohammad Reza Fartousi, filmmaker and producer
- Mohammad Rasoulof, filmmaker, Academy Awards and Palme d'Or nominated and Golden Bear winner, arrested and sentenced to prison for his moves and banned from travel; now lives in Europe
- Mohammad Tolouei, writer and playwright
- Saeed Roustayi, filmmaker, Palme d'Or and César nominated and Crystal Simorgh and FIPRESCI Prize winner at Cannes Film Festival; sentenced Roustayi six months in prison for entering film in Cannes Film Festival
- Sahar Dolatshahi, actress and translator, Crystal Simorgh winner
- Saman Salur, filmmaker, Golden Leopard winner
- Shahram Mokri, filmmaker, winner of the only Special Award for Innovative Content at Venice's Orizzonti
- Pantea Panahiha, actress, Silver Simorgh and Hafez Awards winner
- Parastoo Ahmadi, artist, singer, and YouTuber, sentenced to 74 lashes for singing without wearing a hijab
- Pedram Pour-Amiri, filmmaker, Crystal Simorgh nominated
- Pooneh Hajimohammadi, actress
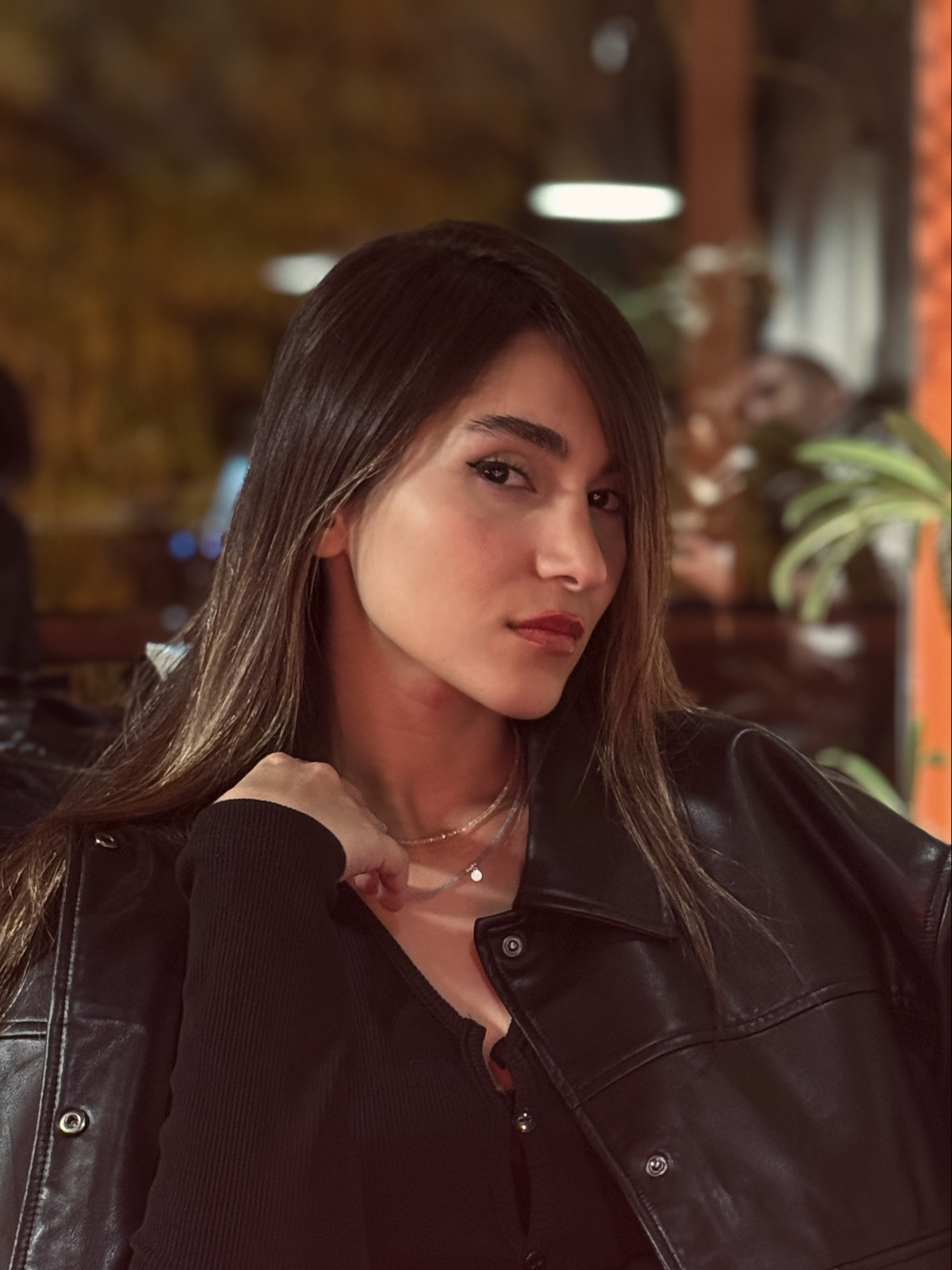
singer Parastoo Ahmadi

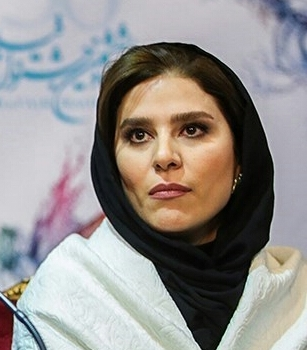
actress Sahar Dolatshahi

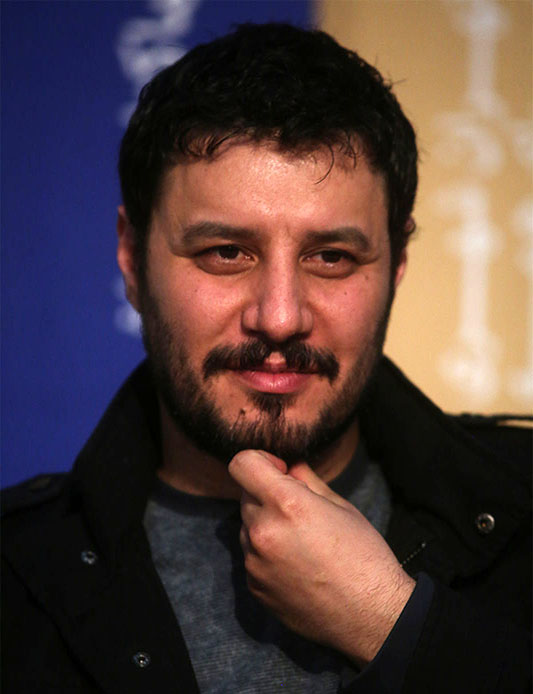
actor and filmmaker Javad Ezzati

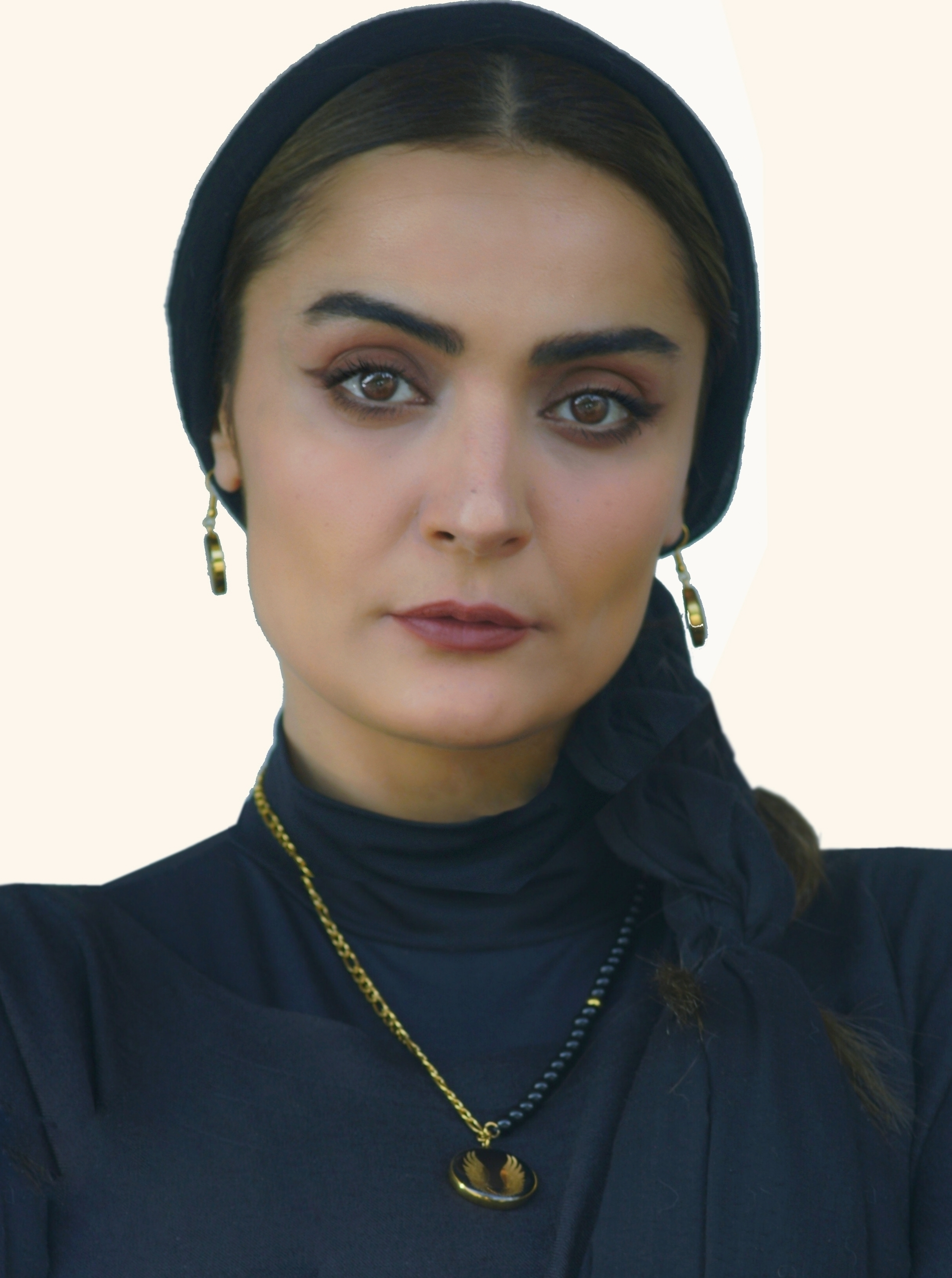
actress and director Elsa Firouz Azar

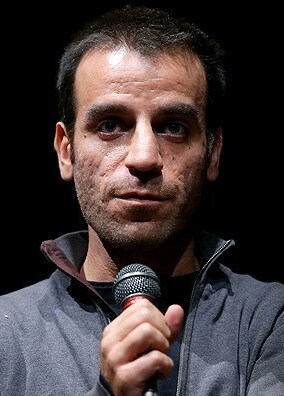
filmmaker Shahram Mokri

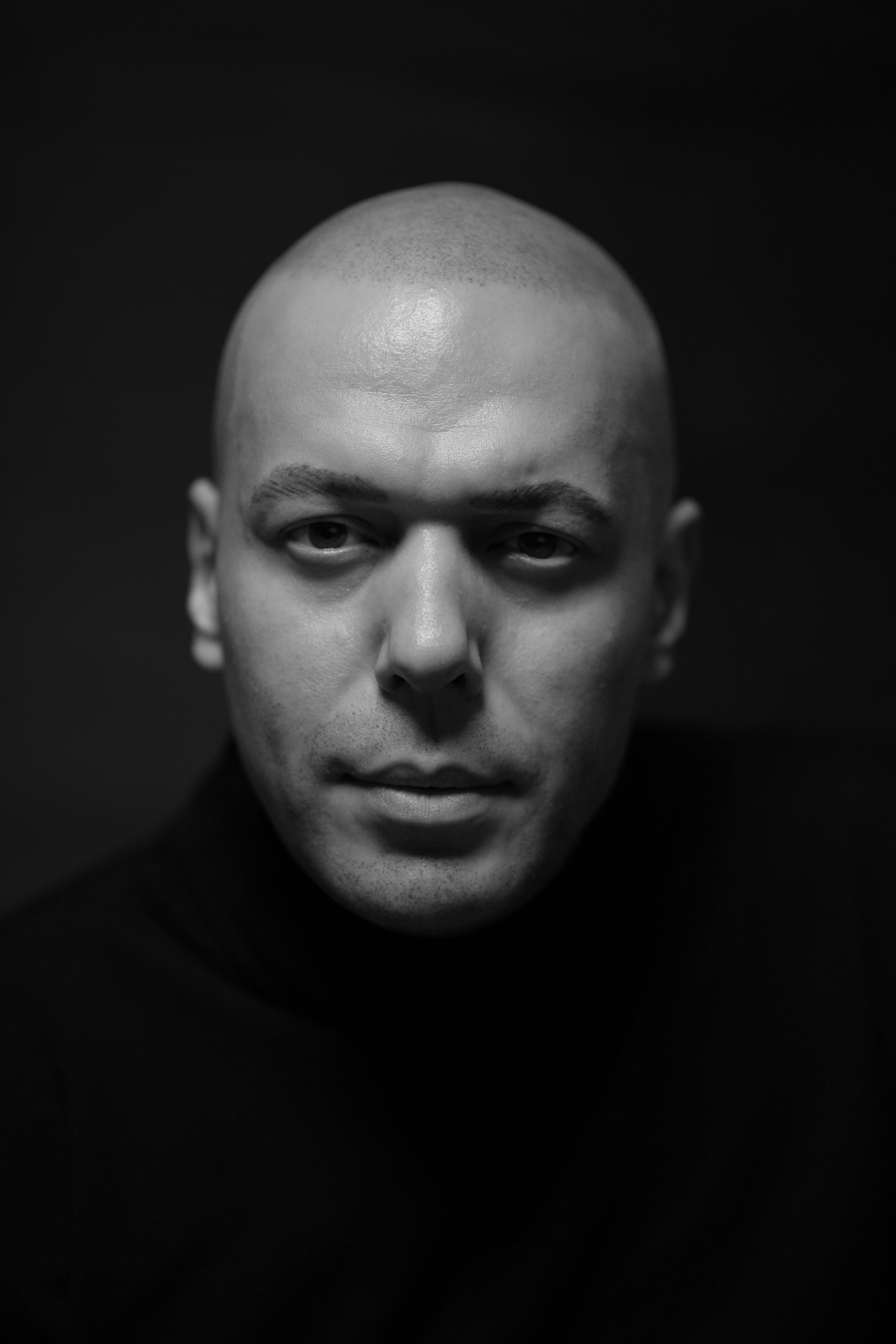
animation director Hossein Molayemi

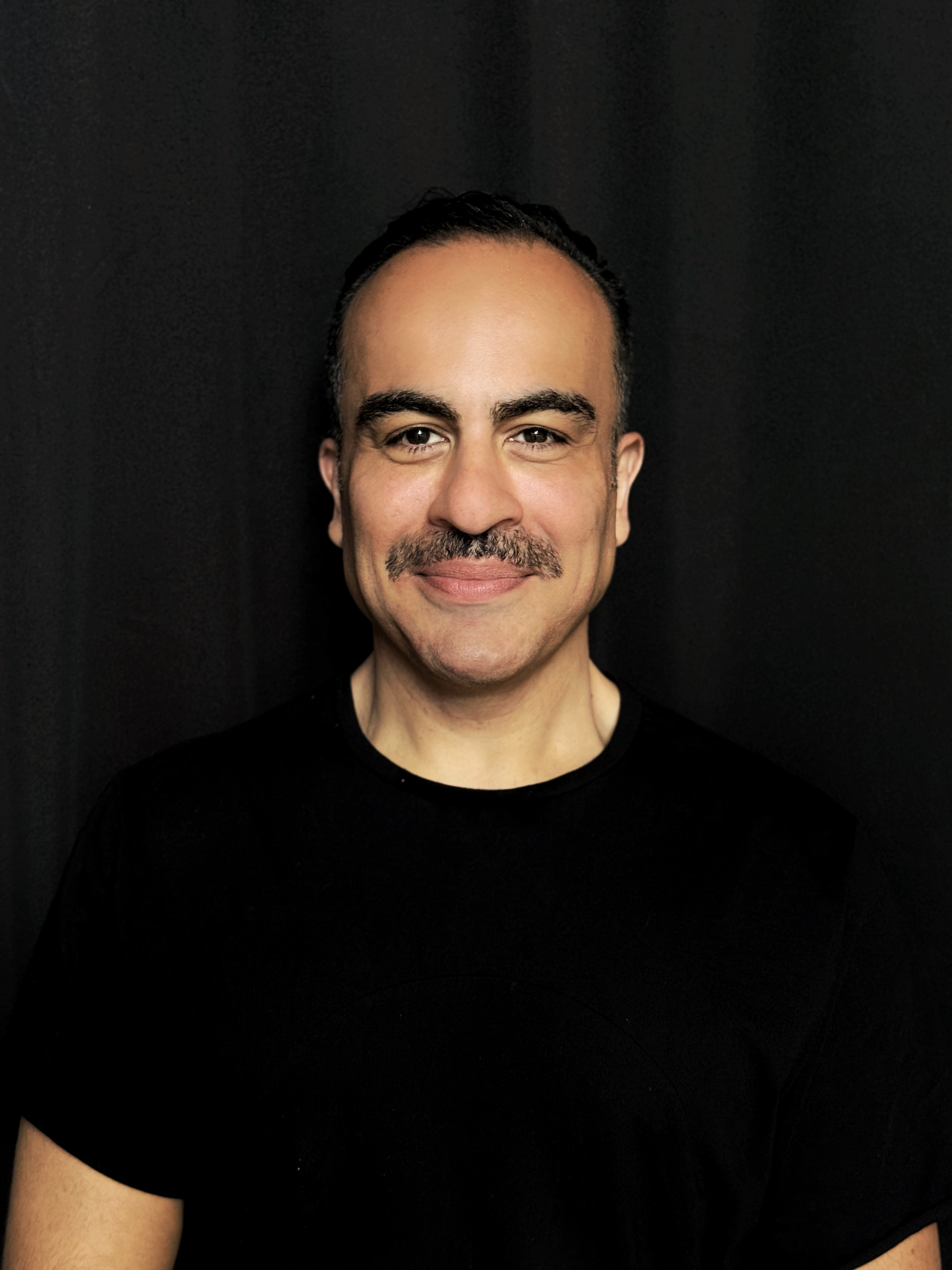
collector, patron, curator, and producer Hamidreza Pejman

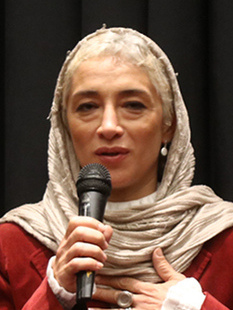
actress Pantea Panahiha

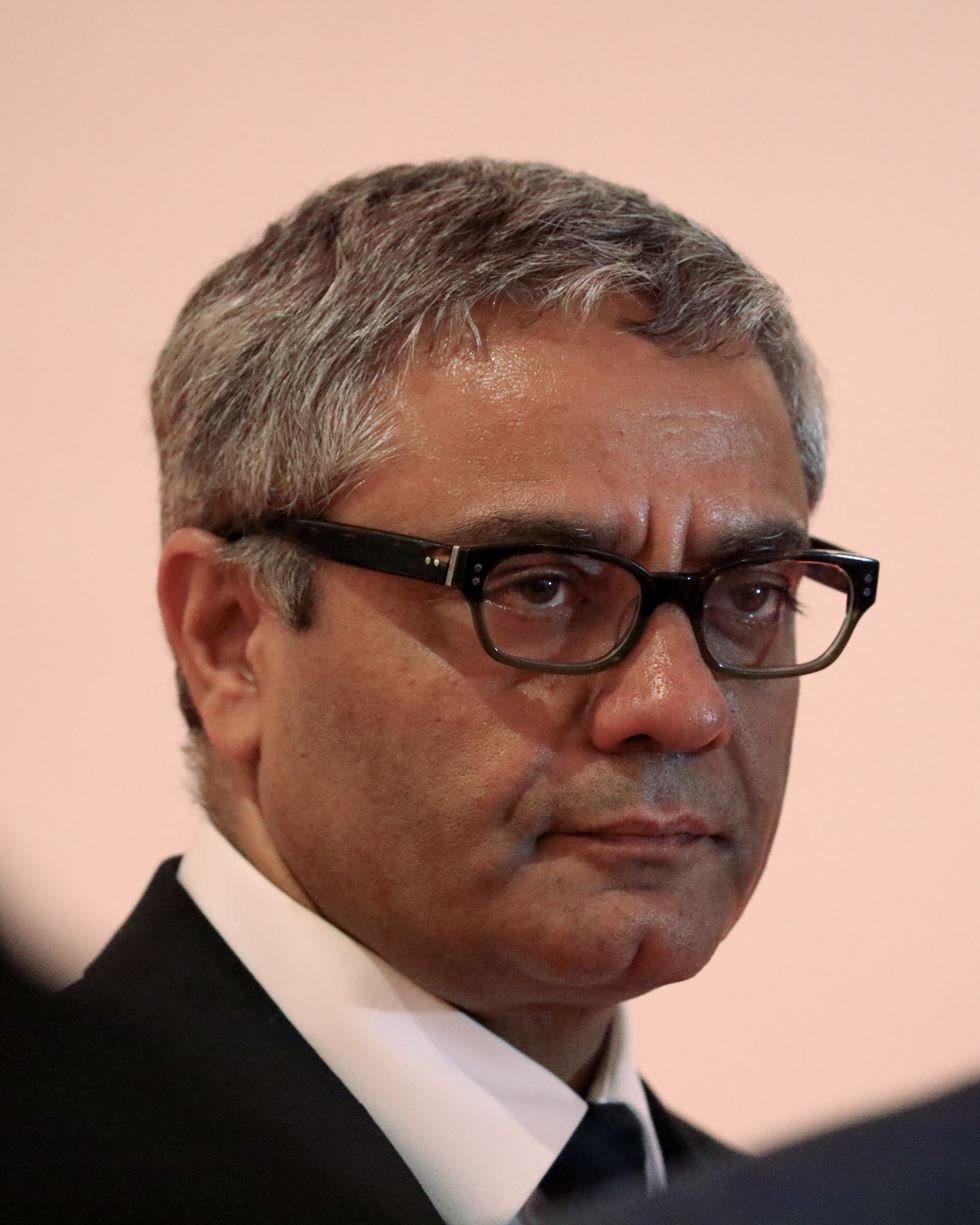
filmmaker Mohammad Rasoulof

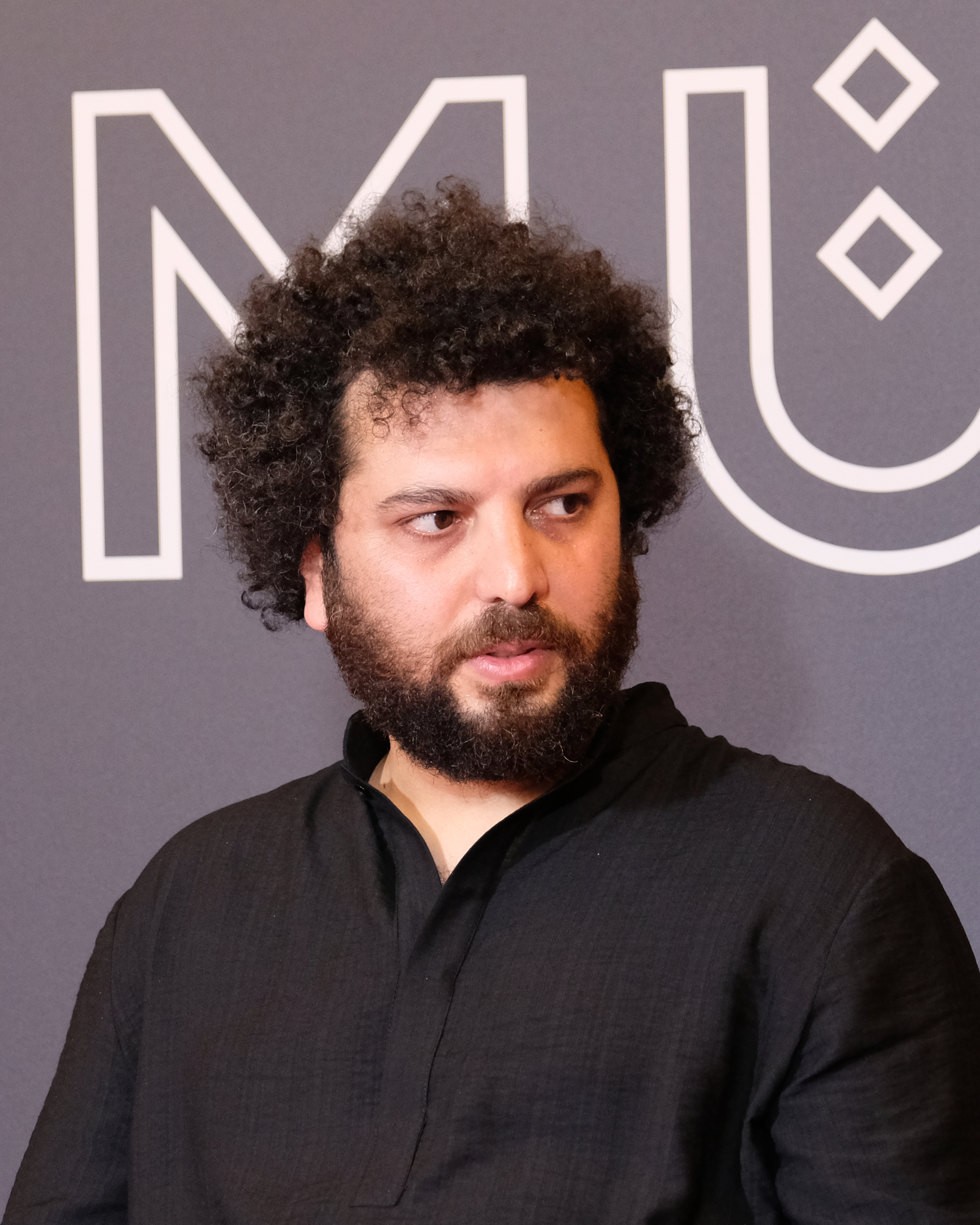
film director and screenwriter Saeed Roustayi

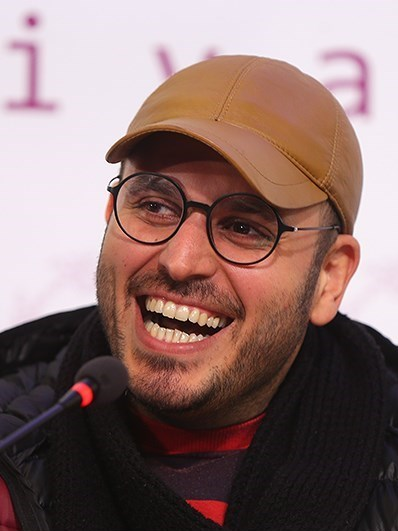
film director and screenwriter Mohammad Hossein Mahdavian

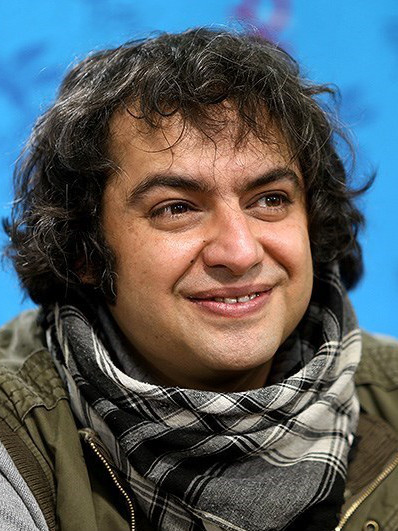
film director and screenwriter Saman Salur

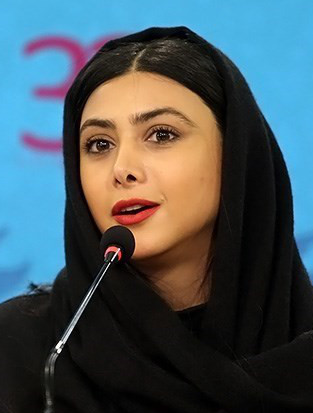
actress Azadeh Samadi

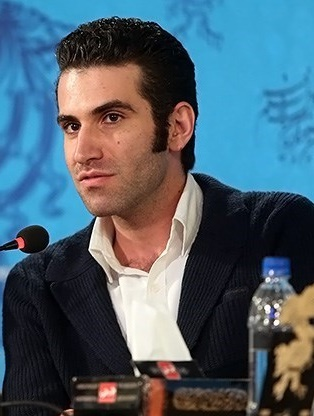
actor and dubber Houtan Shakiba

== Notable faculty ==
- Alireza Khamseh, cinema and television actor and alumnus of Paris 8 with specialization in Pantomime.
- Bahram Dehghani, award-winning film editor and alumnus of USC School of Cinematic Arts.
- Behrouz Gharibpour, theatre director and pioneer of traditional Persian puppet theatre.
- Bozorgmehr Hosseinpour, cartoonist, comic artist, and art director.
- Farzad Motamen, film director.
- Hayedeh Safiyari, award-winning film editor, and a member of the Academy of Motion Picture Arts and Sciences.
- Hengameh Mofid, film/theater actress, director, dramatist, specialized in puppet-theatre.
- Houshang Moradi Kermani, writer best known for children's and young adult fiction, two-times nominated for Hans Christian Andersen Award.
- Majid Barzegar, former alumnus and award-winning filmmaker.
- Masoud Sekhavatdoust, writer, composer and musician.
- Massoud Farasati, famous film critic, and alumnus of ENSBA and Paris 8.
- Maryam Salimi, writer, journalist, communications scholar.
- Mehdi Saeedi, graphic artist and designer, calligrapher, and typographer, only Iranian designer featured on The History of Graphic Design book alongside Reza Abedini.
- Mohammad Shams Langeroodi, renowned poet, author, historian of modern literature and poetry, and university lecturer.
- Mohammad Reza Aslani renowned filmmaker, art theorist, graphic designer and poet known mostly for his experimental films and documentaries.
- Mohammad Reza Delpak, award-winning sound designer, known for his works with Abbas Kiarostami, Asghar Farhadi, Majid Majidi, etc.
- Nima Aziminejad, omposer, setar player and sound engineer.
- Sanam Pasha, songwriter, vocalist and vocal coach in rock and metal music and alumna of Berklee College of Music.
- Shahram Mokri, former alumnus and award-winning filmmaker, winner of the only Special Award for Innovative Content at Venice's Orizzonti.
- Zahra Rahnavard, academic, artist, and politician, former member of university's board of trustees.

== See also ==
Islamic Development Organization
The Artistic Sect of the Islamic Republic
Office of Literature and Art of Resistance
Morteza Avini
