= Asghar Khalili =

- Born: 20 September 1976 (age 50); Tehran, Iran
- Education: Bachelor's degree in cinema from Soore University
- Occupations: Theatre director, screenwriter, editor
- Years active: 1991–present

Asghar Khalili (born 20 September 1976) is an Iranian theatre director, screenwriter and editor. He was born in Tehran, Iran. Khalili has also served as the director of the Teatr-e Shahr complex in Tehran.

Khalili was a judge at the 13th National Marssad Theatre Festival. He was also a member of the selection committee for the Street Theatre Competition at the 42nd Fajr International Theatre Festival.

== Works ==
- Blond Hair
- Red Water
- I Can't, We Can
- Khorramshahr 11
- Songs of Mandela
- The Caucasian Chalk Circle
- Atararnameh
- The Circle
- Life Among Fire
- The Tragedy of War
- Women's Police
- Oliver Twist
- The Dictator in Love
- Corner Under the Oak Trees
- Butcher's Feast
- The Night Reports of Dr. Mossadegh

== Awards ==
- Statue of the 41st Fajr International Theatre Festival and a certificate of appreciation in the playwriting section for Corner Under the Oak Trees.
- Statue of the 18th Resistance Theatre Festival and a certificate of appreciation in the playwriting section for The Unfinished Story of the Beautiful Scribble.
- Statue of the 17th Isfahan Theatre Festival and a certificate of appreciation in the playwriting section for Atararnameh.
