= Jashni =

Jashni is a surname. Notable people with the surname include:

- Jon Jashni (fl. 1989), American media investor and advisor
- Mitra Jashni (born 1976), Iranian artist and political activist
