= The Artistic Sect of the Islamic Republic =

The Artistic Sect of the Islamic Revolution
- حوزه هنری انقلاب اسلامی (Persian)
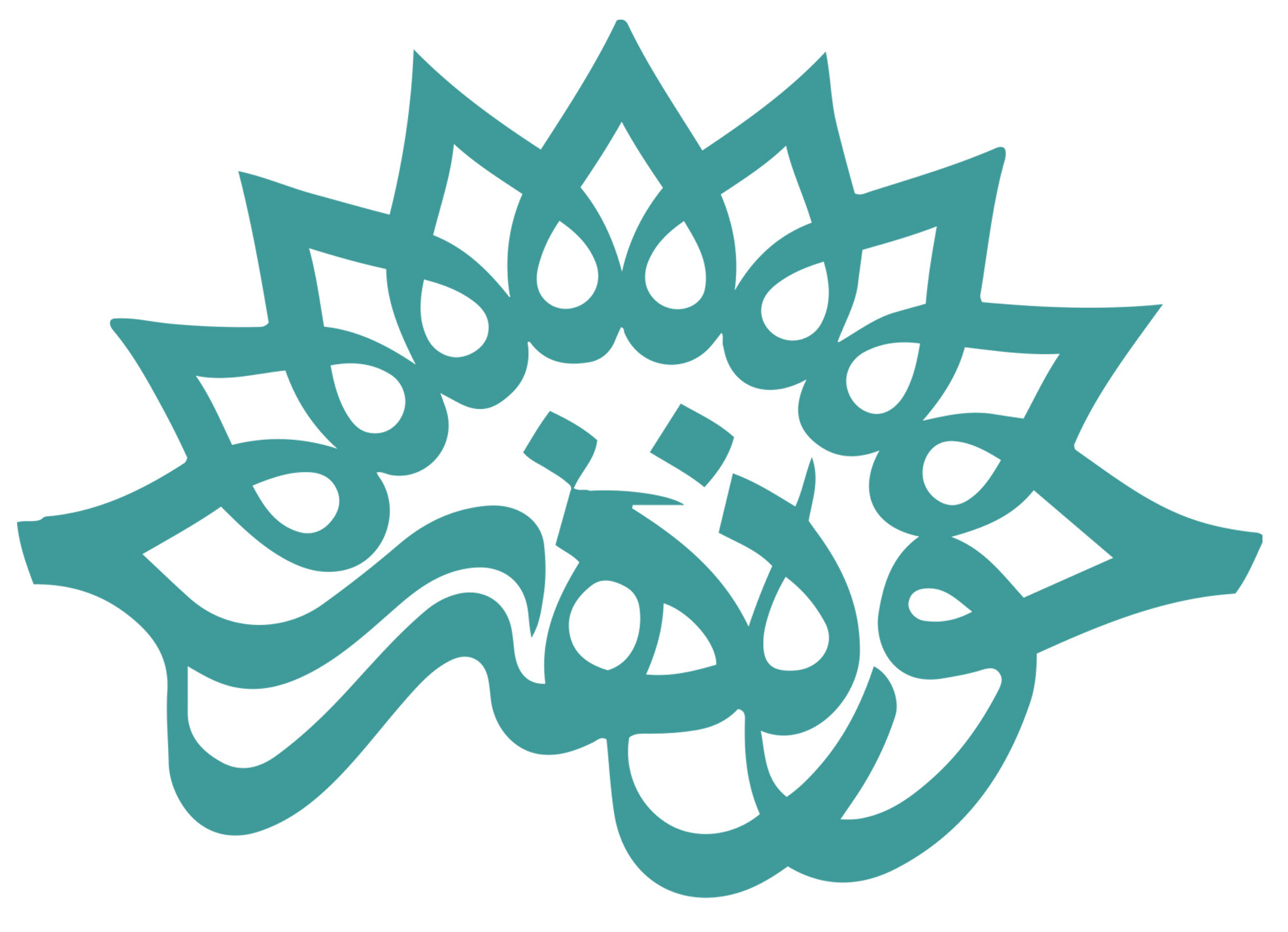
- Type: Cultural institution
- Established: 1979
- Parent institution: Islamic Development Organization
- President: Mohammad Ghomi
- Rector: Mohammad Mehdi Dadman
- Location: Iran
- Website: https://hozehonari.ir/

The Artistic Sect of Islamic Revolution, also known as The Artistic Sect of the Islamic Development Organization (Persian: حوزه هنری انقلاب اسلامی, Hôwze-ye Hônári) and with the former title of the Islamic Art and Thought Sect (Persian: حوزه اندیشه و هنر اسلامی) is a public semi-governmental cultural institution which is a subset division of the Islamic Developmental/Advertising Organization that concentrates mostly on artistic activities.

== History ==
The Artistic Sect began its activity in early 1979, and as an aftermath of Iranian Islamic Revolution. It was firstly proposed by the name of the Institute for Islamic Cultural Renaissance (کانون نهضت فرهنگی اسلامی), and by Tahereh Saffarzadeh's initiative suggestion. After a few months, it began its work under the name of the Islamic Art and Thought Sect. In early 1980s, it became a subdivision under the Islamic Development Organization.

The Artistic Sect formed as a continuation to two main ideologies and institutions, alongside Ayatollah Khomeini's hegemonic idea about the role of Islam in culture and art. First were those who have studied under Ali Shariati and others at Hosseiniyeh Ershad, who had already held painting exhibitions in the mentioned hussainiya. Among them were Mir-Hossein Mousavi, Zahra Rahnavard, Morteza Momayez, Kazem Chalipa, Hossein Khosrowjerdi, and Habibollah Sadeghi. Also, among them poets such as Tahereh Saffarzadeh, Qeysar Aminpour, Mehrdad Avesta, Sepideh Kashani, and Salman Harati can be mentioned. And secondly, were those who followed the ideas of Ahmad Fardid, such as Westoxification and its popularization by Jalal Al-e-Ahmad; people like Morteza Avini, Yousefali Mirshakkak, Ali Moalem Damghani, Mohammad Madadpour, and Shahriar Zarshenas.

According to Khomeini, Art was "infusing the soul of commitment into human bodies", and he continues to say that: "Pure and beautiful art is an art that crushes Capitalism and bloodsucking Communism and destroys the Islam of welfare and luxury, Islam of Eclecticism, Islam of complot and ignobility, and Islam of the impassible prosperous, and in one word, American Islam." Therefore, the Artistic Sect from its early days put all its utmost effort on disseminating the ideas of Revolution and its leader into art. These included theoretical discussions of art, especially in categories such as Religious art, Islamic art, committed art, Aesthetics and philosophy of art as part of its most important concerns. For that matter, the institution started the publication of several magazine titles with cultural and artistic specialization, training courses in various art fields, producing and making movies, producing screenplays, supporting artistic groups in various fields, supporting the holding of ritual shows and ta'ziyeh, reviving authentic Iranian-Islamic arts, as well as performing activities and providing other services in order to maintain the extension and rely on the ideals of Islamic revolution.

After such measures, among artists, filmmakers, and critics who have worked with and came through the Artistic Sect, beside the names mentioned above, filmmakers like Mohsen Makhmalbaf, Majid Majidi, Rasoul Mollagholipour, Ebrahim Hatamikia, Farajollah Salahshoor, and Nader Talebzadeh, critics and journalists such as Ebrahim Nabavi, Massoud Farasati, Hassan Hosseini, and Fereydoun Amouzadeh Khalili, and visual artists such as Reza Abedini, Masoud Nejabati, and Sedaghat Jabbari can be mentioned. Later, this methodology and structure turned into the academic foundations for the current Soureh International University.

== Former Rectors ==
Currently, Mohammad Mehdi Dadman is the current rector at the institute. Before him Mohsen Momeni Sharif, Hassan Bonyanian, and Mohammad-Ali Zam have been its former rectors. Its rector is chosen by the president of the Islamic Development Organization.

== Institute's Subdivisions ==
Among its subdivisions are Soureh International University, Soore Cinematic Inc., Bahman-e Sabz Cinematic Company, the Research Center for Islamic Culture and Arts, Soore-ye Mehr Publication, Mehr Weekly Journal, and Soore Monthly Magazine. This institution is also independently active in the fields of visual arts, performing arts, music, literature, humor, animation, cinema, photography, and art research and education. The Art Sect branches of all provinces are also active in all artistic fields under the supervision of the strategic deputy of the provinces within the institute.

== See also ==
Islamic Development Organization
Soureh International University
Amir Kabir Publishers
Office of Literature and Art of Resistance
