= Anahita Norouzi =

Iranian visual artist (born 1983)

- آناهیتا نوروزی
- Born: 1983 (age 41–42); Iran
- Education: Concordia University; Soore University
- Occupation: Visual artist
- Website: anahitanorouzi.com

Anahita Norouzi (Persian: آناهیتا نوروزی; born 1983), is an Iranian multidisciplinary visual artist, based in Montreal, Canada. Her work is articulated across various materials and mediums, including sculpture, installation, photography, performance, and video.

She is most noted for her projects Spoken Objects: Reweaving Fractures and Ghosts (2022), Troubled Garden: Study for Migratory Roots (2021), Other Landscapes (2019–2020), It Looks Nice from a Distance (2017–2020), and One Hundred Cypresses (2013).

== Education ==
Originally from Tehran, Iran, she has been active in Montreal since 2018. She holds advanced degrees in Fine Arts from Concordia University in Montreal and Graphic Design from Soore University in Tehran.

== Career ==
Norouzi's practice is research-driven, focusing on marginalized histories and the legacies of botanical explorations and archeological excavations, particularly when scientific research became entangled in the colonial exploitation of non-Western geographies. She often travels between Iran and Canada to research the intersection of colonial histories, experiences of immigration and displacement, and the issue of identity and memory. She has participated in several solo and group exhibits throughout the globe, including BIENALESUR, the International Contemporary Art Biennial of South America, Buenos Aires (2021) Montreal Museum of Fine Arts, Montreal (2022), MOP CAP Art Prize at Royal College of Art, London and Dubai (2013), Regards Tehran, Virtual or Real, Tehran (2010), and the 10th and 11th Biennial of Iran Photography, Tehran (2006 and 2008).

Her pieces interrogate different cultural and political perspectives on the human and non-human "other," highlighting the complex space between the conflicted state of displaced people, plants, and cultural artifacts and the host country's responsibilities.

== Recognitions and awards ==
- Finalist of the Sobey Art Award (2023)
- Winner of Contemporary Art Award, Musée national des beaux-arts du Québec (2023)
- Winner of Impressions Residency and Creation Award, Montreal Museum of Fine Arts (2022)
- Resident at Montreal Museum of Fine Arts (2022)
- Resident at Banff Centre for Arts and Creativity (2022)
- Recipient of Liz Crockford Artist Fund Award (2022)
- Winner of Grantham Foundation for Arts and Environment Award (2021)
- Resident at Grantham Foundation for Arts and Environment (2021)
- Finalist in MOP CAP Art Prize (2013)

== Works ==
=== May You Break Free and Outlast Your Enemy (2023) ===
May You Break Free and Outlast Your Enemy (2023) comprises a sculptural installation of a colossal cracked clay head surrounded by ten fritillaria imperialis, a flower native to Iran, rendered in black glass and paired with a photographic diptych taken by the artist's father depicting a meadow next to an oil field aflame. The work recalls the entwined histories of oil extraction, botanical excursions, and archeological expeditions. It critiques the disciplines of art history, archaeology and botany which have been used to justify extractive practices such as the expropriation of land, natural resources and cultural belongings as part of the imperialist project. It reflects on the roles of cultural institutions like museums and archives and collection and acquisition processes.

This work has been shown at the National Gallery of Canada in 2023 and the Art Gallery of Burlington in 2025.

=== Troubled Garden: Study for Migratory Roots (2022) ===
Planting Displacement (2022) brings together an expansive body of Norouzi's work that includes archival documents, photographs, cyanotypes, sculptures, and videos, all of which investigate the plant colloquially referred to as giant hogweed. This project examines the legacies of botanical explorations, when scientific research and agricultural production became entangled in the exploitation of non-Western geographies, shaping cultural attitudes towards the human and non-human “other.” Originating in Southwest Asia and known in the artist's ancestral homeland of Iran as Heracleum persicum (Persian hogweed), the plant spread to the West in the nineteenth and twentieth centuries through European colonial interventions, trade routes, and Western interest in acquiring “exotic” species. In recent decades it has been recognized as a noxious weed in the West affecting native flora and fauna, and human beings too, due to its toxic sap.

Troubled Garden: Study for Migratory Roots has been shown at Grantham Foundation for Arts and Environment, the Art Gallery of Guelph, and Montreal Museum of Fine Arts, and received attention from media such as LaPresse, Spirale, esse, among others.

=== Other Landscapes (2020) ===
Other Landscapes (2020) is multi-part project that stems from Norouzi's long-term research interest in the cross sections of botany and colonial politics, experiences of immigration and displacement, as well as issues of identity and memory. Taking the form of a multimedia installation, the project results from a collaboration between Norouzi and eight refugees from the Middle East and North Africa. As a way to get closer to their stories, she focuses on the objects that they brought with them on their journey. The small selection of belongings that they can bring along as they leave their lives behind adds a significant meaning to the status of these objects. Essentially, they embody what a person wanted to retain from their home.

This body of work has been exhibited at Esplanade Art and Heritage Center, Plein sud, centre d'exposition en art actuel, and Stewart Hall Gallery, and Warren G. Flowers Art Gallery, and received attention from current news outlets and magazines such as CBC, Vie des arts, and Spirale.

=== Tehran, The Apocalypse (2012) ===
Tehran, The Apocalypse (2012) is a documentation of a performance which was filmed in Tehran in 2011, after the government's crackdowns of the Green Movement protests. The work exists at the intersection of performance and documentary realism. Locating herself as a ‘citizen-artist’, Norouzi performs an act of violence in a public space and creates a moment of extreme tension, as she attempts to challenge gender norms and critique institutionalized forms of political and religious violence in Iran.

In the subsequent years, Norouzi performed two other performances in Tehran—One Hundred Cypresses (2013) and Flesh Memory (2017)—which the three together creates a trilogy that intends to map the boundaries of the artist's physical and psychological strength. By using her body and its materiality, with the histories and geographies that determine it, this trilogy calls for an active participation of individuals in the process of preserving what they identify with in the era of decay.
