= Iranian Academy of the Arts =

Learned society

Iranian Academy of Arts (IAA) (Persian: فرهنگستان هنر ایران; formally Academy of Arts of the Islamic Republic of Iran) was established in March 2000. It is one of the four academies of the Islamic Republic of Iran; the other three academies are the Iranian Academy of Medical Sciences, the Iranian Academy of Sciences, and the Academy of Persian Language and Literature. The IAA is an authorized entity affiliated with presidential administration.

== Presidency ==
Mir Hossein Mousavi served as the President for 11 years until he was removed in 2009. Ali Mo'alem Damghani was selected as second president of Academy in December 2009 by the Supreme Council of Cultural Revolution. Then in March 2021, Dr. Bahman Namvar Motlaq elected as the president of the academy through the process of the Supreme Council of Cultural Revolution and then approving by the President Hassan Rouhani.

In June 2023 Majid Shah-Hosseini was elected as the new President of Iranian Academy of Arts.

== Organization ==
The academy consists of the president of the country as the supreme chancellor of the academies, the board of trustees, the general assembly, the president of the academy, and the experts council.

== Objectives ==
Among the objectives of the Iranian Academy of Arts are: proposing policies for the preservation and promotion of Islamic, national and local arts; research and utilization of new art theories with reliance on the national and Islamic fundamentals; support and encouragement of basic research and following up the implementation of art projects and studies at national level; annual evaluation of art indices in the country; and studying the shortcomings of the educational system of the country in the field of art and offering proposals to the related institutions.

== Members ==
The Academy has three types of members including permanent, associate and honorary members.

According to article 16 of the Academy's charter, the Iranian Academy of Arts will have thirty regular members, twenty of whom will be elected by the Art Council's nomination and the Cultural Revolution Supreme Council's approval, and the remaining ten will be elected by the latter twenty.

== Divisions ==
1. The Central Building
2. Saba Cultural and Art Institute (SCAI)
3. Aseman Cultural-Artistic Complex (ACAC)
4. Palestine Museum of Contemporary Arts (PMCA)
5. Naghsh-e Jahan Art Research Center (NJARC)
6. Art Research Center (ARC)
7. Especialized Library
