= Fossil (2023 film) =

- Persian: فسیل
- Directed by: Karim Amini
- Written by: Hamzeh Salehi
- Produced by: Ebrahim Amerian
- Starring: Bahram Afshari; Hadi Kazemi; Iman Safa; Elnaz Habibi; Elahe Hesari; Babak Karimi; Javad Hashemi; Gholamreza NikKhah; Omid Rohani; Samaneh Moniri; Alireza Ostadi; Reza Bay; Khashayar Rad
- Cinematography: Rouzbeh Rayga
- Edited by: Hassan Ayoubi
- Music by: Amir Tavasoli
- Distributed by: Filmiran (Cinema); Filimo (Online)
- Release date: 15 March 2023
- Running time: 108 minutes
- Country: Iran
- Language: Persian

Fossil (Persian: فسیل) is a 2023 Iranian comedy film directed by Karim Amini.

== Plot ==
Esi Amouee (Bahram Afshari), Saeed (Hadi Kazemi), and Safa (Iman Safa), members of the Black Dogs music group, strive for fame and success. Esi wants to perform in front of the Shah, but Safa has leftist leanings and tries to gain popularity among the people by composing protest songs, but they end up in prison. Esi, who is on his way to the Shah's palace, falls into a coma in an accident and wakes up 10 years later. He discovers that the Shah is gone and the Islamic Republic is in power, He also finds out that his fiancée Farangis (Elnaz Habibi) is married and Saeed is married to his sister...

== Cast ==
- Bahram Afshari
- Hadi Kazemi
- Iman Safa
- Elnaz Habibi
- Elahe Hesari
- Babak Karimi
- Javad Hashemi
- Gholamreza NikKhah
- Omid Rohani
- Samaneh Moniri
- Amir Hossein Mohabat
- Alireza Ostadi
- Reza Bay
- Khashayar Rad
- Majid Shahryari
- Ghasem Zare
- Mehri Alagha
- Roham Heydarali
- Misagh Jamshidi
- Yasin Kalateh
- Vahid Esmikhani
- Sadegh Khodapanah
- Fatemeh Mortazi

== Production ==
The film was produced during the coronavirus pandemic in 2019. According to the author, one sequence was censored and several seconds were removed altogether. The initial script for this film was written by Karim Amini, Ali Bateni, and Armin Tahmasebi, and its final writing was done by Hamzeh Salehi.

== Feedback ==
In the first week of May 2023, Fossil became the first Iranian film to sell more than 100 billion tomans, with sales of 170.62 billion tomans and 420,000 viewers. On August 9, 2023, the number of viewers of Fossil exceeded 5 million 330 thousand people, and this film managed to break the audience record of the film The Deportees 2 after 14 years, and became the most watched film in the history of Iranian cinema in the first year of its release.

== Awards ==
Year	Award	Category	Recipient	Result
2023	Hafez Awards	Best Actor statuette	Bahram Afshari	Won
2023	Fajr Film Festival	Crystal Simorgh Best Poster	Mohammad Taghipour	Won
