= Sophie & the Mad =

2017 film directed by Mehdi Karampour

- سوفی و دیوانه
- Directed by: Mehdi Karampour
- Written by: Mehdi Karampour and Mehdi Sajjadchi
- Produced by: Mehdi Karampour
- Starring: Amir Jafari; Behafarid Ghafarian
- Cinematography: Mohammad Aladpoush
- Edited by: Nazanin Mofakham
- Release date: February 2017 (Fajr Film Festival)
- Running time: 92 minutes
- Country: Iran
- Language: Persian

Sophie & the Mad (Persian: سوفی و دیوانه) is a 2017 Iranian film directed by Mehdi Karampour.

== Cast ==
- Amir Jafari as Amir
- Behafarid Ghafarian as Sophie
- Mohamad Reza Sharifinia as Reza
- Elahe Hesari as Ziba
- Reza Yazdani as Singer
