= Saman Salur =

Iranian film director and screenwriter (born 1976)

- سامان سالور
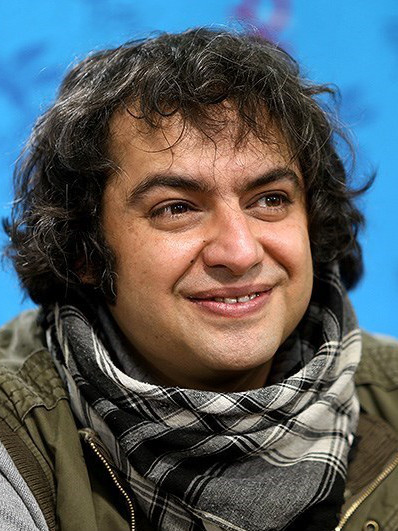
- Salur at the 32nd Fajr International Film Festival
- Born: 1976 (age 49–50); Boroujerd, Iran
- Education: Soore University
- Occupation: Filmmaker
- Years active: 2003–present

Saman Salur (born 1976) is an Iranian film director and screenwriter. He graduated from Soore University with a Bachelor of Film and Television in Directing.

He is known for directing and writing the comedy feature 'A Few Kilos of Dates for a Funeral' 2006 winning Golden Leopard and Special Prize of the Jury at Locarno International Film Festival, a special Jury from Sofia International Film Festival and a Montgolfiere from the Three Continents Festival. His first documentary 'Residents of Silent Land' won award in Molodist Kiev International Film Festival. His last movie "We will say Amen" has been banned for 4 years till 2016.

== Filmography ==
- The Wind Will Comb Your Tresses, 2002 (Short Film)
- IT’S A SONY, 2002 (Documentary)
- The Guilty, 2002 (Cinematography)
- From Land of Silence, 2004
- A Few Kilos of Dates for a Funeral, 2006
- Aramesh ba Diazepam 10, 2005 (Documentary)
- Lonely Tune of Tehran, 2008
- Stories on Human Rights, 2008
- Be Hadaf Shelik Kon, 2011 (Writer)
- Thirteen 59, 2011
- We Will Say Amen, 2012 (New edition has been released on 2016)
- Raspberries, 2013
- Puff Puff Pass, 2020
- Killing a Traitor, 2022

== Awards ==
- Winner of the Jury Special Mention - Sofia International Film Festival 2005
- Winner of the FIPRESCI Award of the Jury - Molodist Kiev International Film Festival 2005
- Golden Leopard - Locarno International Film Festival 2006
- Won Best Film and Director - Edinburgh International Film Festival 2006
- Special Award - Batumi International Art-House Film Festival 2009

== See also ==
- Cinema of Iran
- Fajr International Film Festival
