= Mehdi Karampour =

Iranian film director

- مهدی کرم‌پور
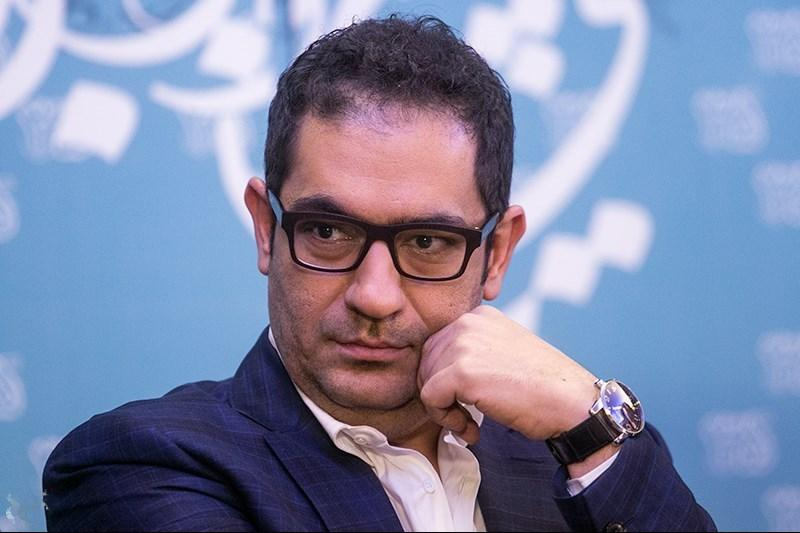
- Born: September 11, 1976 (age 49); Tehran, Iran
- Education: University of Tehran
- Occupations: Film director, producer, writer
- Years active: 1996–present

Mehdi Karampour (Persian: مهدی کرم‌پور; born September 11, 1976, in Tehran) is an Iranian film director, producer, writer and photographer.

== Biography ==
Karampour has a master's degree in film directing and has started making short films and documentaries. In addition to filmmaking, he has also collaborated with the press, and various writings and articles can be seen among his works. In addition, Karampour teaches cinema and has been a member of the selection and judging panel for various works at various festivals. In addition to being a member of the Iranian Cinema Refereeing Academy, he has been a member of the Central Council of the Iranian Cinema Directors Association (2010–2011), spokesman for the Central Council of the Iranian Cinema Directors Association (2010), and chairman of the Cinema House Theater Council (2010–2018). The Central Council of the Iranian Cinema Producers Guild has been a member of the Advisory Board of the Board of Directors of the Cinema House (2010–2010), a member of the founding board of the Iranian Short Film Association and the board of trustees of the Iranian Young Cinema Association.

== Filmography ==
=== Movies ===
- Sophie & the Beast (2016)
- The Wooden Bridge (2011)
- Tehran Tehran (2009)
- Who killed Amir? (2005)
- Somewhere Else (2002)

=== TV series ===
- Cloud Years (2014)
- A piece of land (2012)

=== Short films ===
- On the damp road (2000)
- Life Above the World (1998)
- Invitation (1997)
- To be or not to be (1997)
- The Wall (1996)
- Cookie Doll (1996)

=== TV movies (telefilms) ===
- OutCast (2009)
- Night Shift (2009)
- The Eighth Day (2009)
- The Seventh Day (2007)
- Evicted (2007)

== Opinions ==
=== In the 2013 presidential election ===
Mehdi Karampour was one of 140 Iranian artists who, along with other reformists and moderates, signed a petition on June 12, 2013, while publicly acknowledging Aref's resignation in favor of Rouhani and publicly supporting Hassan Rouhani's candidacy in the 2013 presidential election.

Reaction to Mahnaz Afshar's marriage and criticism of Marzieh Boroumand

After Marzieh Boroumand's remarks about Mahnaz Afshar's marriage, Mehdi Karampour, in a note criticizing Marzieh Boroumand, said that Mahnaz Afshar had married Yassin Ramin in perfect sanity and health, and also said:

"Their wedding sermon (Mahnaz Afshar and Yasin Ramin) was also read by Seyyed Mohammad Khatami, and despite Ms. Marzieh Boroumand's misinformation, I tell you that there was no veiling and Mr. Khatami knew and accepted the bride and groom and their families very well. "It was and... now everyone was fine."

Mehdi Karampour added:

"It is unlikely that you, on the pretext of the theater's small budget, will publish the false information about the dowry of this and the car under it and ask for a share of half of their price in favor of the theater!" "Draw on the board."

=== Cancel the Fajr Film Festival ===
After the downing of a Ukrainian passenger plane by the Revolutionary Guards in January 2017, to sympathize with the people, he did not accept the offer of a judge in the competition section of the Fajr Film Festival.
