= Amir Hossein Mohabat =

Iranian actor

- امیرحسین محبت
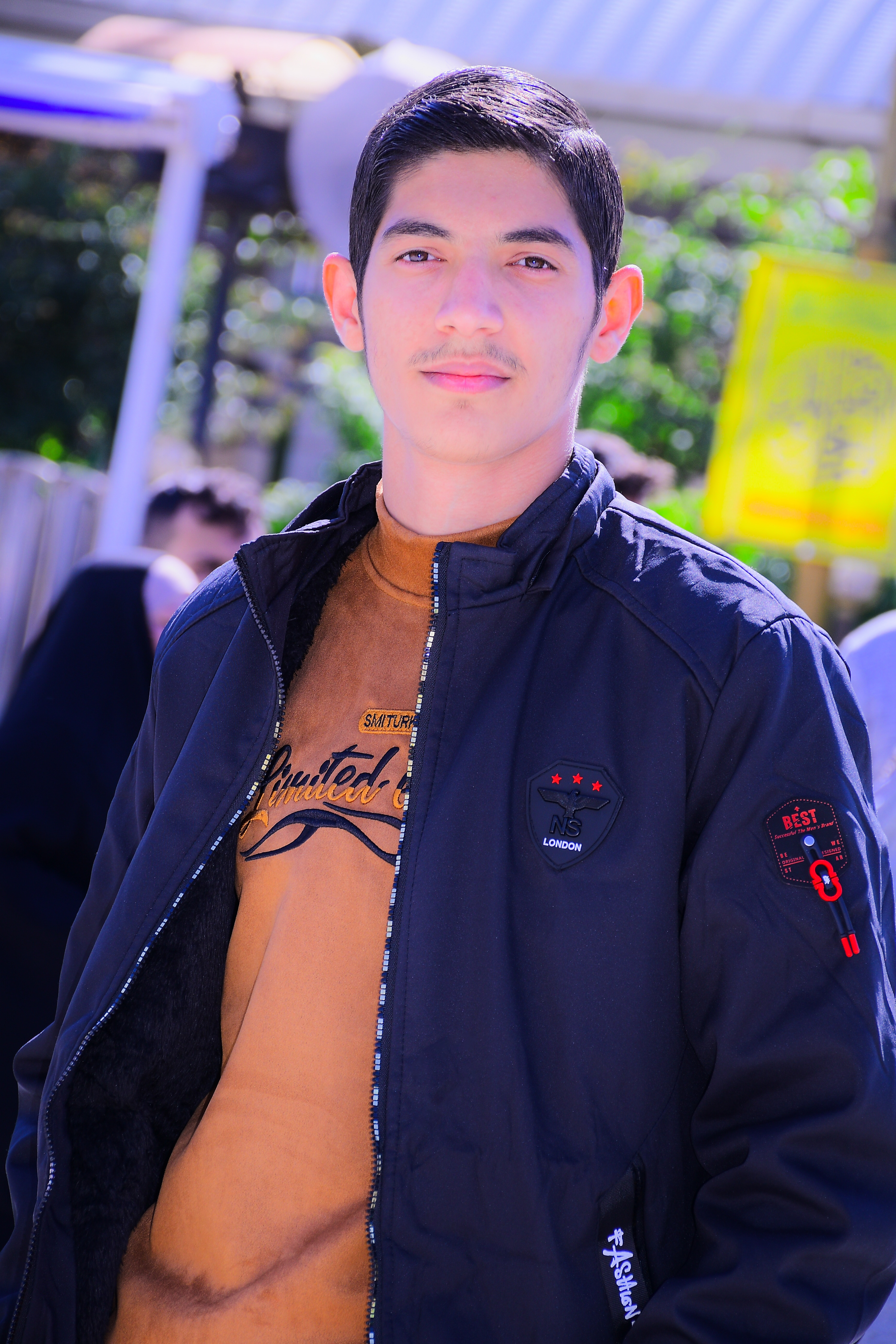
- Amir in February 2024
- Born: 24 January 2003 (age 23) yazd, Iran
- Education: Islamic Azad University
- Occupations: Actor, singer

Amir Hossein Mohabat (Persian: امیرحسین محبت, born January 24, 2003) is an Iranian actor and singer He has been active in cinema since 2009 and continues to this day.

== Singing ==
He started his career at Yazd Music School in 2009 and received his degree He started his career as a guitarist in the film (Dardesar Bozorg) in 2010 and later, Amir released his first album as a singer in 2022, titled Esteghlal, arranged by (Mehdi Kord), and is currently working on the fall album.

== Career ==
He started his career as a guitarist in the film (Dardesar Bozorg) in 2010 and later, by learning to make animations according to parts of the series Paytakht in 2011, he designed and made the cartoon characters of this series. He was also very interested in acting and with the starred in two films in 2012 in the film (Gasht-e ershad) as Alireza. In 2016, he played the role of Mohammad hossein in the film Noghteh kor. He starred in three feature films in 2022. Including Bucharest, Solitary, A Hero. Amir In 2023, he played the role of Mohammad Reza in the movie Fossil. It is said that this movie became the second highest-grossing movie in the history of Iranian cinema.
