= Mitra Jashni =

Iranian writer and artist (born 1976)

- میترا جشنی
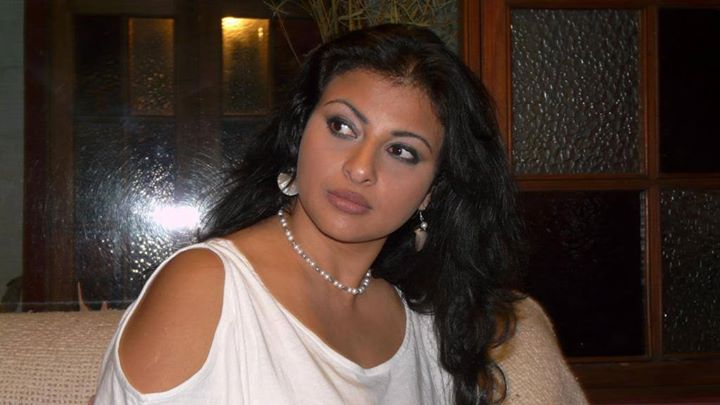
- Born: 16 December 1976 (age 49); Mashhad, Iran
- Education: Soore University
- Known for: Visual art, activism

Mitra Jashni (Persian: میترا جشنی; born 16 December 1976) is an Iranian visual artist and political activist, of Kurdish ethnicity. She works in the mediums of painting, drawing, and sculpture; as well as works as an art teacher, poet, and singer of Iranian contemporary music. She is one of the founders and executive director of Farashgard, an Iranian political party and activist group based in Washington, D.C.

== Biography ==
Jashni was born in Iran on 16 December 1976 in Mashhad, Pahlavi Iran. In 2008, she received a MA degree in painting from Tehran's Soore University.

As of 2014, she had worked as an artist for more than ten years in Iran, Canada, South America, and Europe.
