= Sanam Pasha =

Sanam Pasha صنم پاشا
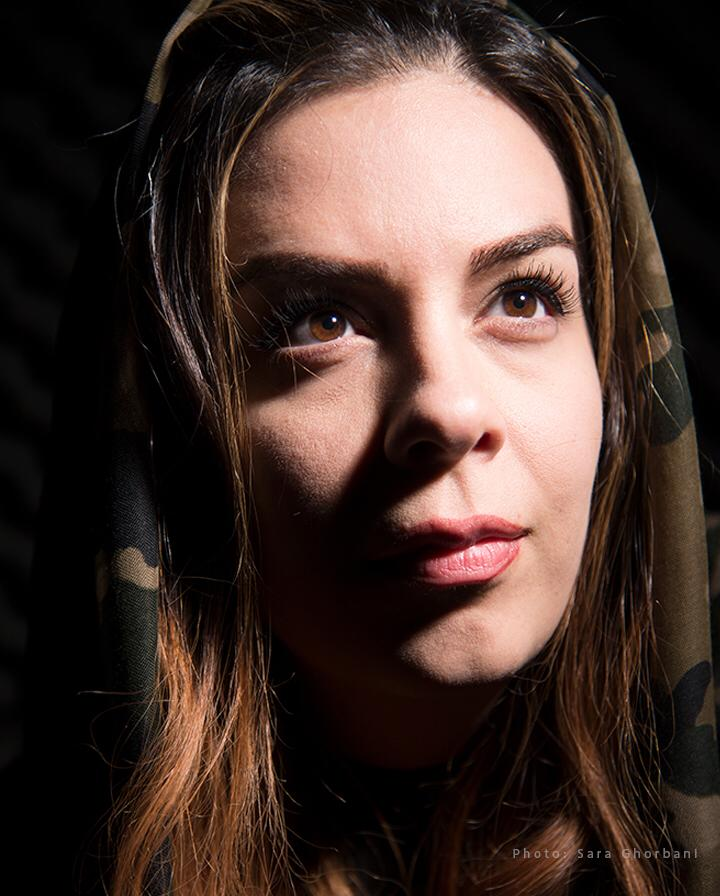

Background information
- Born: July 16, 1978 (age 47); Tehran, Iran
- Genres: Rock; Metal
- Occupations: Singer, composer, songwriter, pianist, vocal coach
- Instruments: Vocal, piano
- Website: sanampasha.com

Sanam Pasha (Persian: صنم پاشا) (born in 1978, Tehran) is an Iranian songwriter, vocalist and vocal coach in rock and metal music. As a child, she learned Persian folk music and later went on to learn classical piano, vocals, and solfeggio. She also has an online Masters's certificate in Songwriting and Vocals from the Berklee College of Music. She founded Sanam Pasha, an all-female rock band, in 2012.

== Career ==
Before the founding of Sanam Pasha in 2012, She had been actively engaged in singing, songwriting, and composition.

=== Singing career ===
- Vocal in "Thunder" rock- country band concerts, Iran, Tehran, 2012–2013
- Lead vocal of "5grs" band in Arm fest, Armenia, Yerevan, 2013
- Lead vocal of "5grs" band in Persian Metal Festival, Armenia, Yerevan, Summer 2012
- Leader of the choir band in Ra’ad NGO for disabled students, Iran, Tehran, November 2011–present
- Studio vocal and lyricist for the metal album "Lets Crush", Spring 2011
- Studio vocal and lyricist for the metal album "Access denied", Fall 2009
- Studio vocal and lyricist for the metal album "Lets Crush", Spring 2011
- Singer and pianist in the traditional Iranian band Keyhan concerts in Iran, Tehran, Gorgan 2010–2011
- Vocal chanting and pianist for the movie "Aramesh Miane Mordegan", Fall 2005.
- Vocal chanting for the movie "Hamishe PayeYek Zan Dar Mian Ast" by Kamal Tabrizi, Winter 2008
- Vocal chanting for a television series " Istgah ", Fall 2008
- Singing traditional for plays and rehearsals in Molavi Hall Festival 2007
- Vocal in "Ghogha" band in the 22nd Fajr Music Festival, Winter 2004
- Lead singer in an underground rock concert with Arash Radan's band, summer 2003
- Back vocalist in the "Irania" band, 2005–2007
- Vocal in "Arte" Jazz fusion band, 2016
- Lead vocal in From Isfahan to Isfahan Album with Farzin Tehranian 2015
- Back vocal in Baadzang's new song – Roozhaye Khoobe in Jahan 2021
- Back vocal in Hezar Hich album with Hamed Behdad 2021.
- Vocalist and melody vocal writer Day & Night single 2020.
- Vocalist & Composer The Grey Single 2020
- Vocalist and Songwriter in Built On Blood Album 5grs, Metal East Records. 2022
- ٰVocalist the jazz fusion album Incidents, featuring songs by Orod Anzabipoor.

=== Composition and songwriting career ===
Pasha has composed many pieces for different films, animations, and plays. She has mentioned in an interview that the limitations imposed upon women's presence in the music scene of Iran have led her to pursue a more serious outlook in composition in the last few years.

- Composing music for the Animation of "What's the difference between me and a forget" by Ehsan Nasri, 2017
- Songwriting for two parts of the theater "Astane" by Elahe Moonesi 2016
- Composing music for the theater " the one who said yes, the one who said no" by Majid Rahmati 2017
- Composing music For the musical theatre "Life for Life" by Reza Bahrami, 2016
- Composing music for 7 Theaters by Roohollah Jafari (1-The Cherry Orchard 2-The Little Prince 3-Antigone 4-Blood Wedding 5-Macbeth 6-The last Godot), 2015 – City Theater of Tehran
- Composing and singing in a short documentary "Pedar Bozorg Animation Iran" 2011
- Composing and singing for the short movie "Sangbaran" by Samira Sinae 2008
- Composing music for movie "Shabi Dar Tehran" by Mehrdad Kazemi 2007
- Composing Music for the theatre " Chah Akhshij" Directed by: Mehrav Nouri 2007
- Composing Music For the theatre with the name of "Piano" at Molavi Hall 2004
- Composing music for Giti Theater Group's repertoire at Sanglach Hall 2019

=== The Sanam Pasha band ===
The Sanam Pasha band is the first all-female rock band in Iran, which staged their first show on August 25, 2018, in Tehran. even though, due to certain laws, only women were allowed to buy the tickets, the show sold out in two days. The band's members are Sanam Pasha (vocalist, songwriter, and the founder), Bita Sadeghi (Electric guitar), Rima Hassan Zadeh (Bass guitar), Armina Jafari (Drums), with the company of guest members Forooq Fazli (keyboard), Ava Hosseini (Backing vocalist), and Nava Hosseini (Backing vocalist), staged the band's first show.

== Awards and certifications ==
- The best scream singer at Arm Rock Fest, International Rock Competition, April 2013
- The audience's first choice for composing, Mazmour Festival, Winter 2011
- Berklee Celebrity scholarship in the name of singer-songwriter, Patty Larkin. Winter 2010
- Certificate of Appreciation from Ra’ad Rehabilitation Goodwill Organization 2011 fall
- Certificate of Appreciation Rock Iran Winter 2012
- Certificate of Appreciation from the Iranian Artists Forum, 2009

== Vocal coaching ==
Pasha is also a vocal coach in Blues, Rock, and Metal music genres and has been present as a judge in many Iranian rock festivals and competitions. In 2008, she started a vocal contest, which has since then been held in the presence of other judges such as Farshid Arabi, Homayoun Majdzadeh and others. According to Pasha, the purpose of the contest was to provide a chance for the vocalists in rock genres, especially women, who do not enjoy an equal chance when it comes to the vocals.

She is currently an official instructor for RSL (Rockschool), providing certified vocal training in these genres.
