= Behafarid Ghafarian =

Iranian actress

- به‌آفرید غفاریان
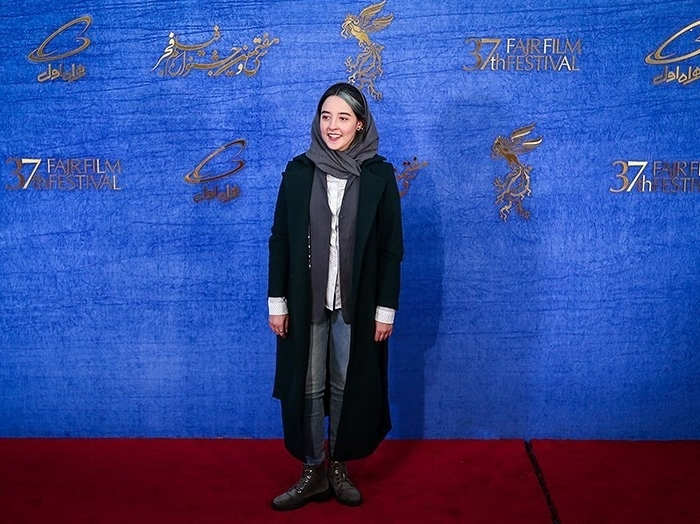
- Ghafarian at the 37th Fajr Film Festival
- Born: 20 January 1994 (age 32); Tehran, Iran
- Education: Soore University
- Occupation: Actress
- Years active: 2009 - Present
- Parents: Behrooz Ghafarian (father); Sousan Bahadoran (mother)

Behafarid Ghafarian (Persian: به‌آفرید غفاریان; born: 20 January 1994) is an Iranian actress. Her most noted work is playing the protagonist in Sophie & The Mad (2017). She is also known for work on the stage, particularly for playing “Leila Arash” in “Fe’l”, a play written and directed by Mohammad Rezaee Raad.

== Filmography ==
Year	Film	Role	Director	Ref.
2017	Sophie & The Mad	Sophie	Mehdi Karampour	
2018	Dressage	Shirin	Pooya Badkoobeh	
2019	A Man Without a Shadow	Khorshid	Alireza Reisian	

== Theatre ==
Year	theatre	Role	Director	Ref.
2013	The Cherry Orchard	Anya	Hasan Majouni	
2015	The Lieutenant of Inishmore	Mairead	Hasan Majouni	
2017	Three Sisters	Irina	Hasan Majouni	
2018	The Verb	Leila Arash	Mohammad Rezaei Rad	
2020	Sunday Dinner		Mohammad Ghanbari	
