= Ali Moalem Damghani =

Iranian poet (born 1951)

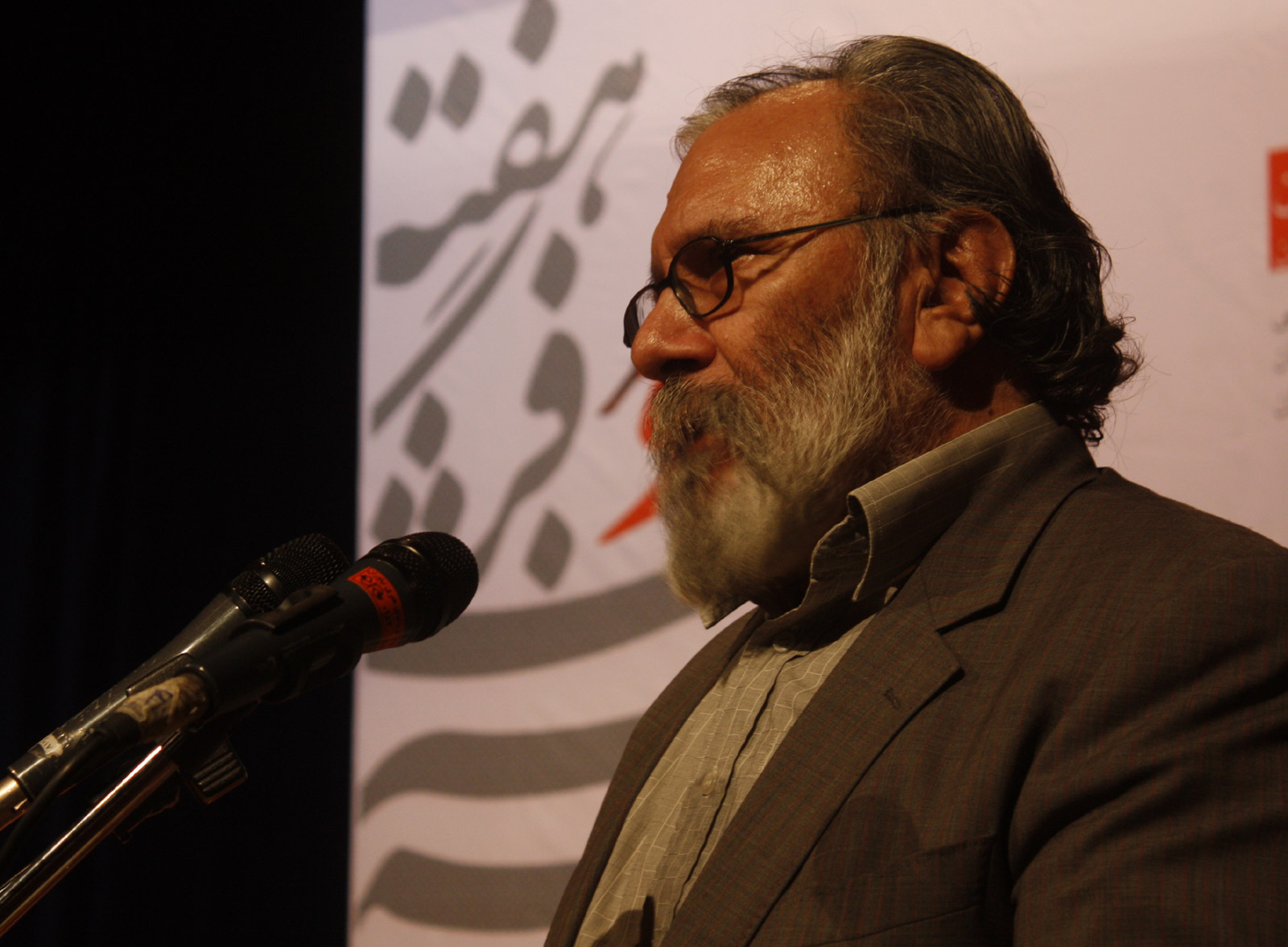
Image of Moalem Damghani

Mohammad-Ali Moalem Damghani (Persian: محمدعلی معلم دامغانی born in 1951 in Damghan, Iran) is an Iranian poet, lyricist, and scholar. He holds a law degree from the University of Tehran and has contributed to contemporary Persian literature. His early work, notably the poetry collection "The Red Return of the Star," published in 1961 and republished in 1985 by The Artistic Sect of the Islamic Republic, established him as a prominent figure in Iranian literary circles.

Moalem Damghani is often considered one of the first generation of poets of the 1979 Iranian Revolution. His works, including the epic poem "Hegira" in praise of Ayatollah Khomeini, are deeply rooted in religious themes and have been widely celebrated for their contributions to Iran's revolutionary literature. He has also penned numerous lyrics for popular Iranian singers such as Mohammad Esfahani, Mohammad Reza Shajarian, and Majid Akhshabi, with his composition "Baran" (Rain) from Shajarian's album "Shab, Sukut, Kavir" being particularly well-known.

In addition to his literary pursuits, Moalem Damghani has held significant academic and cultural positions. He was elected as a distinguished figure in Persian poetry and literature at the first National Festival of Distinguished Figures in 2001. In 2008, he was appointed as the president of the Iranian Academy of the Arts by the Supreme Council of the Cultural Revolution, succeeding Mir-Hossein Mousavi. His tenure saw a continued focus on promoting Persian arts and culture.

== Bibliography ==
- Moniri, Hojjatollah.ghe; Dohniyatkar, Nushin (2019). "Symbol and Symbolism in Sacred Poetry" (PDF). International Journal of Advanced Studies in Humanities and Social Science. 8 (2): 137–147. ISSN 2345-2749.
- Keshmirshekan, Hamid (2023). "Historiography of Modern and Contemporary Art of Iran". The art of Iran in the twentieth and twenty-first centuries: tracing the modern and the contemporary. Edinburgh: Edinburgh University Press. pp. 48–84. doi:10.3366/edinburgh/9781474488648.001.0001. ISBN 9781474488679.

== See also ==
- Iranian Academy of the Arts
