= Military ranks of Iran =

The military ranks of Iran are the ranks used by the Islamic Republic of Iran Armed Forces. The armed forces are split into the Islamic Republic of Iran Army and the Islamic Revolutionary Guard Corps. The ranks used by the Law Enforcement Forces share a similar structure to the military.

== Military ranks ==
=== Army ===
==== Commissioned officer ranks ====
The rank insignia of commissioned officers.

| Rank group | General / flag officers | | | | | Senior officers | | | Junior officers |
|---|---|---|---|---|---|---|---|---|---|---|---|---|
| Iranian Ground Forces |
| Iranian Ground Forces | ارتشبد; Arteshbod | سپهبد; Sepahbod | سرلشکر; Sarlashkar | سرتیپ; Sartip | سرتیپ دوم; Sartip dovom | سرهنگ; Sarhang | سرهنگ دوم; Sarhang dovom | سرگرد; Sargord | سروان; Sarvān | ستوان یکم; Sotvān yekom | ستوان دوم; Sotvān dovom | ستوان سوم; Sotvān sevom |
| Iranian Navy |
| Iranian Navy | دریابد; Daryabod | دریاسالار; Daryasalar | دریابان; Daryaban | دریادار; Daryadar | دریادار دوم; Daryadar dovom | ناخدا یکم; Nakhoda yekom | ناخدا دوم; Nakhoda dovom | ناخدا سوم; Nakhoda sevom | ناوسروان; Navsarvan | ناوبان یکم; Navban yekom | ناوبان دوم; Navban dovom | ناوبان سوم; Navban sevom |
| Iranian Air Force |
| Iranian Air Force | ارتشبد; Arteshbod | سپهبد; Sepahbod | سرلشکر; Sarlashkar | سرتیپ; Sartip | سرتیپ دوم; Sartip dovom | سرهنگ; Sarhang | سرهنگ دوم; Sarhang dovom | سرگرد; Sargord | سروان; Sarvān | ستوان یکم; Sotvān yekom | ستوان دوم; Sotvān dovom | ستوان سوم; Sotvān sevom |
| Iranian Air Defense Force |
| Iranian Air Defense Force | ارتشبد; Arteshbod | سپهبد; Sepahbod | سرلشکر; Sarlashkar | سرتیپ; Sartip | سرتیپ دوم; Sartip dovom | سرهنگ; Sarhang | سرهنگ دوم; Sarhang dovom | سرگرد; Sargord | سروان; Sarvān | ستوان یکم; Sotvān yekom | ستوان دوم; Sotvān dovom | ستوان سوم; Sotvān sevom |
| Rank group | General / flag officers | | | | | Senior officers | | | Junior officers |

==== Student officer ranks ====
| Rank group | 4th year | 3rd year | 2nd year | 1st year |
|---|---|---|---|---|
| Iranian Ground Forces; Imam Ali Officers' Academy |
| Iranian Navy; Imam Khomeini Naval University |
| Iranian Air Force; Shahid Sattari Aeronautical University |
| Iranian Air Defense Force; Air Defense Academy |

==== Other ranks ====
The rank insignia of non-commissioned officers and enlisted personnel.

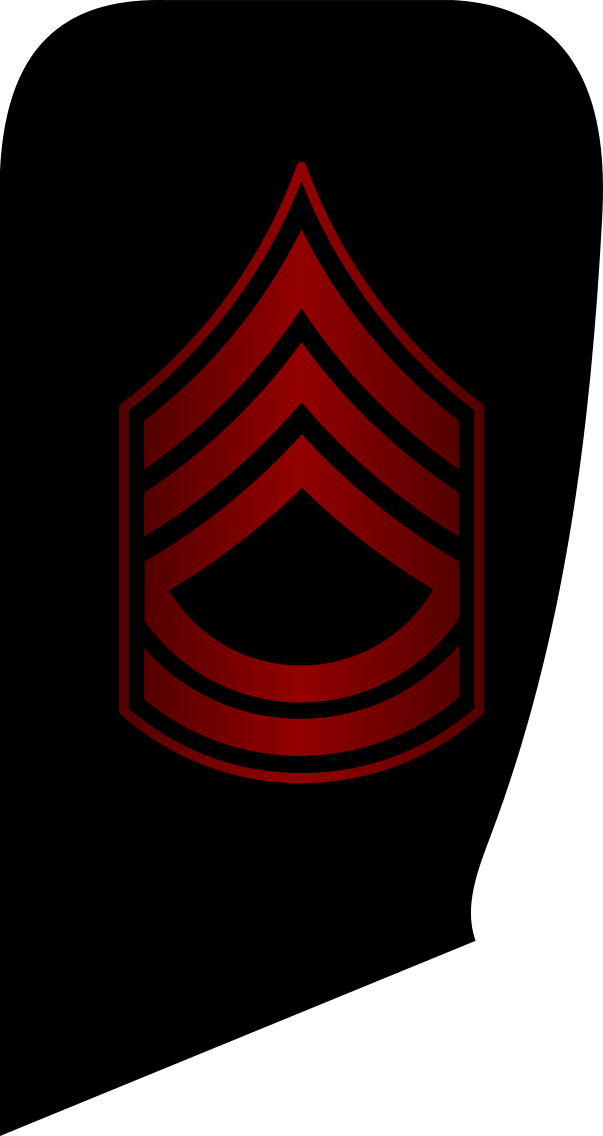
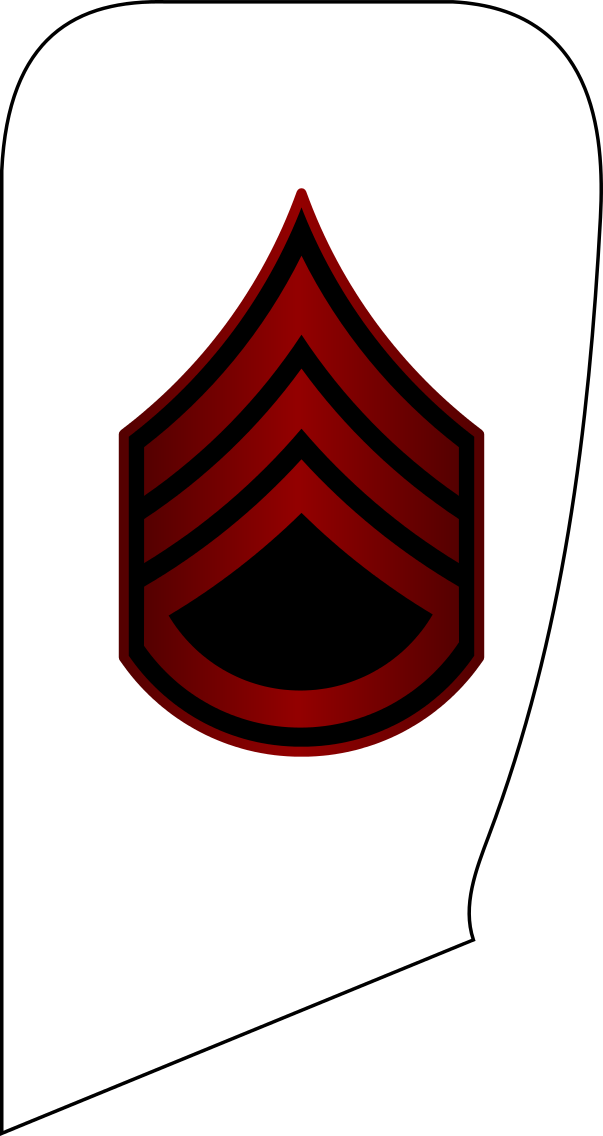
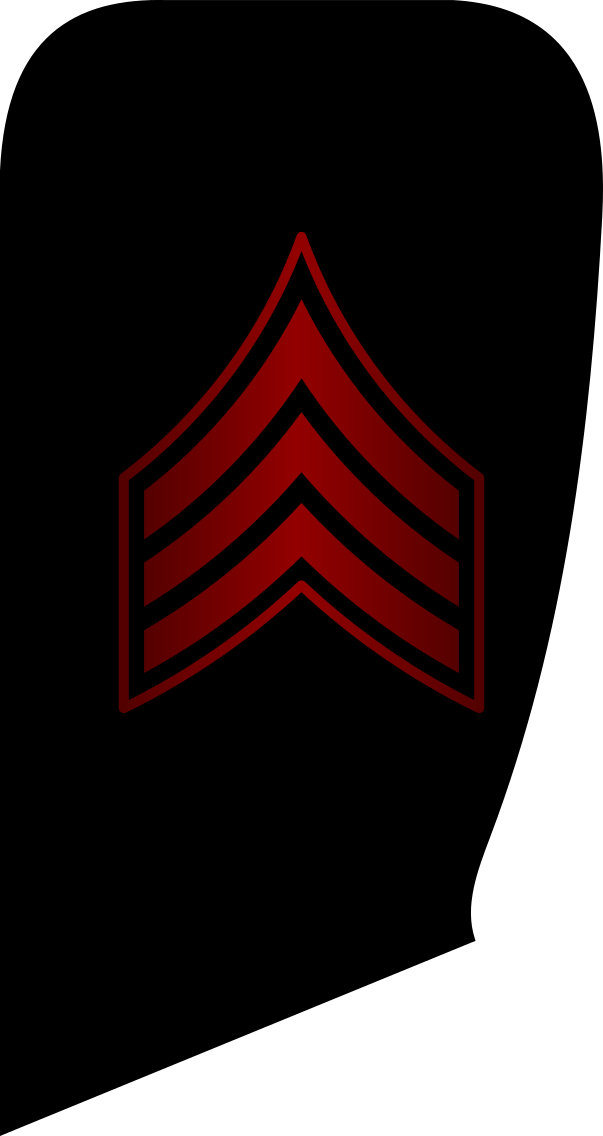
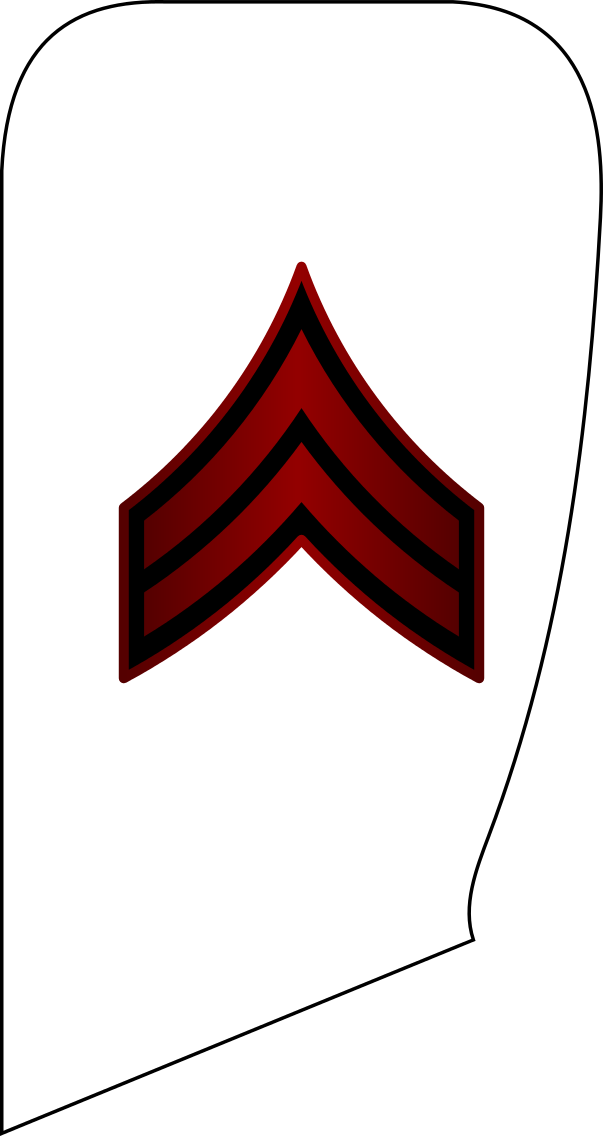
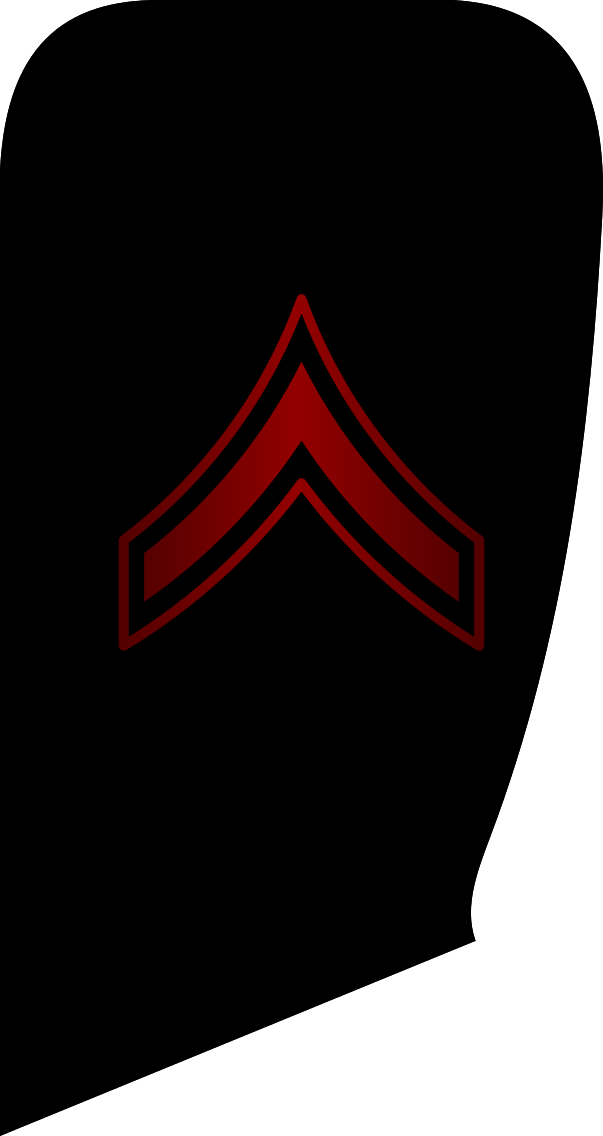
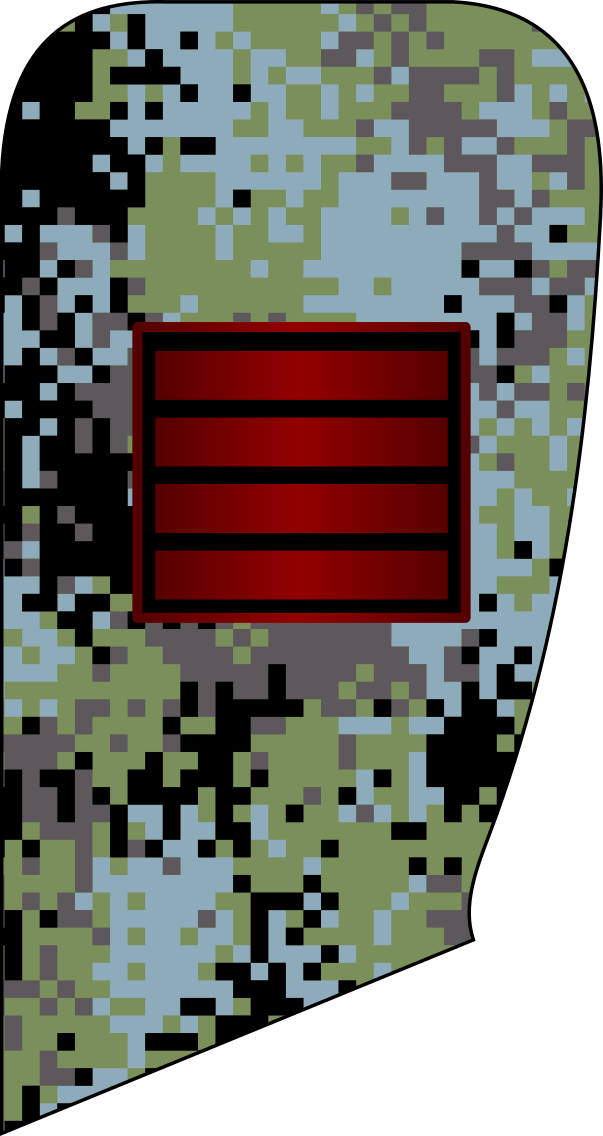
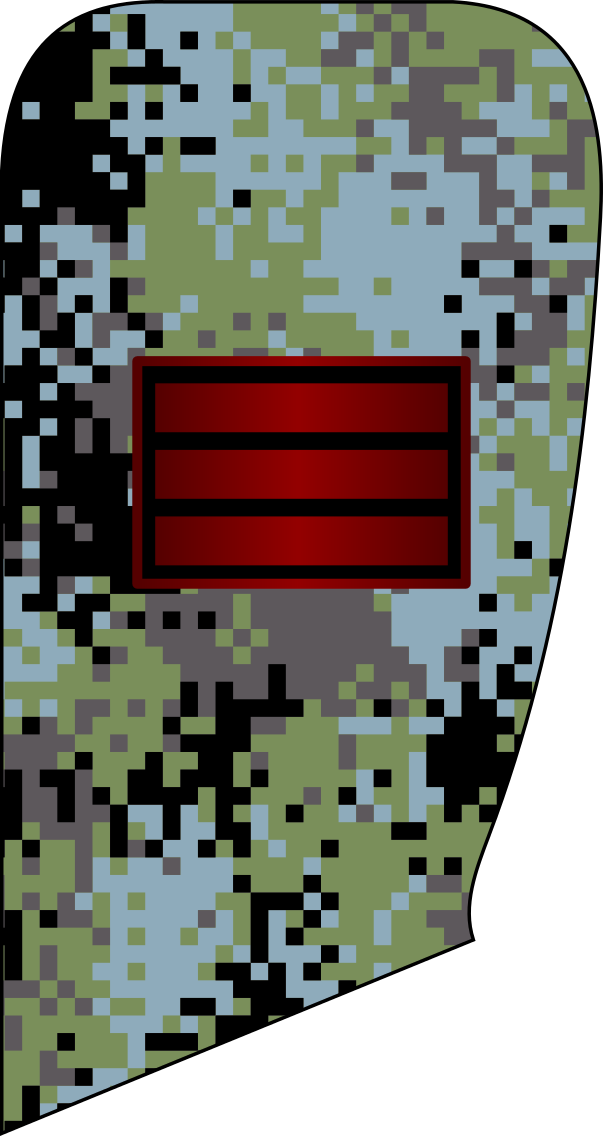
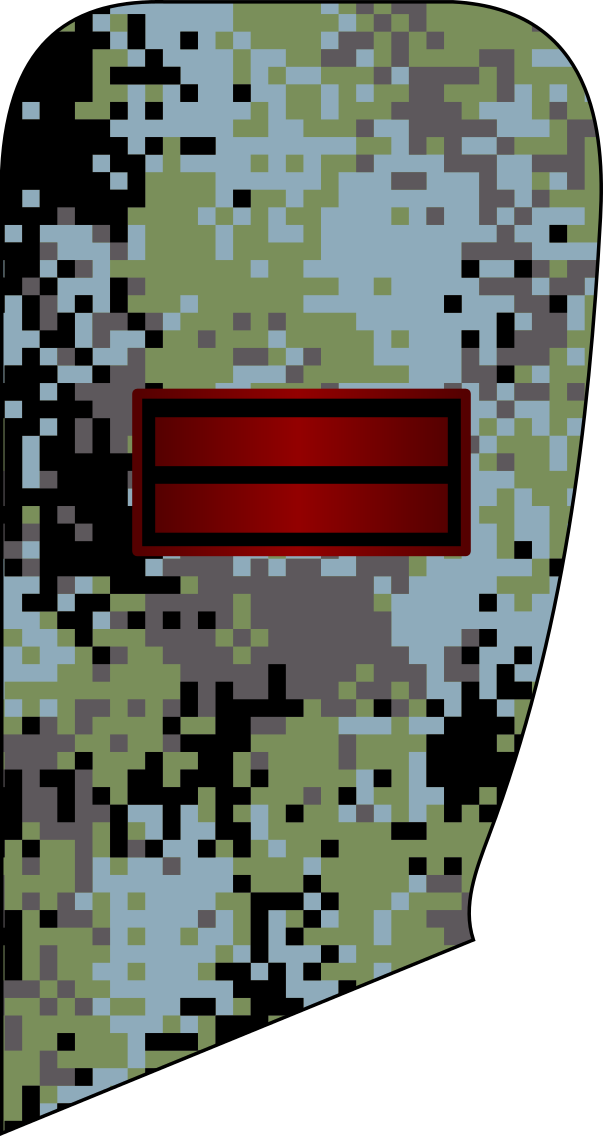
| Rank group | Senior NCOs | | | | | Junior NCOs | | Enlisted |
|---|---|---|---|---|---|---|---|---|---|
| Iranian Ground Forces |
| Iranian Ground Forces | استوار یکم; Ostovar yekom | استوار دوم; Ostovar dovom | گروهبان یکم; Goruhban yekom | گروهبان دوم; Goruhban dovom | گروهبان سوم; Goruhban sevom | سرجوخه; Sarjukheh | سرباز یکم; Sarbaz yekom | سرباز دوم; Sarbaz dovom | سرباز; Sarbaz |
| Iranian Ground Forces | Chief warrant officer | Warrant officer junior grade | Sergeant first class | Sergeant second class | Sergeant third class | Corporal | Private first class | Private second class | Private |
| Iranian Navy |
| Iranian Navy | ناواستوار یکم; Navostovar yekom | ناواستوار دوم; Navostovar dovom | مهناوی یکم; Mahnavi yekom | مهناوی دوم; Mahnavi dovom | مهناوی سوم; Mahnavi sevom | سرناوی; Sarnavi | ناوی یکم; Navi yekom | ناوی دوم; Navi dovom | ناوی; Navi |
| Iranian Air Force |
| Iranian Air Force | استوار یکم; Ostovar yekom | استوار دوم; Ostovar dovom | گروهبان یکم; Goruhban yekom | گروهبان دوم; Goruhban dovom | گروهبان سوم; Goruhban sevom | سرجوخه; Sarjukheh | سرباز یکم; Sarbaz yekom | سرباز دوم; Sarbaz dovom | سرباز; Sarbaz |
| Iranian Air Force | Chief warrant officer | Warrant officer junior grade | Sergeant first class | Sergeant second class | Sergeant third class | Corporal | Private first class | Private second class | Private |
| Iranian Air Defense Force |
| Iranian Air Defense Force | استوار یکم; Ostovar yekom | استوار دوم; Ostovar dovom | گروهبان یکم; Goruhban yekom | گروهبان دوم; Goruhban dovom | گروهبان سوم; Goruhban sevom | سرجوخه; Sarjukheh | سرباز یکم; Sarbaz yekom | سرباز دوم; Sarbaz dovom | سرباز; Sarbaz |
| Iranian Air Defense Force | Chief warrant officer | Warrant officer junior grade | Sergeant first class | Sergeant second class | Sergeant third class | Corporal | Private first class | Private second class | Private |
| Rank group | Senior NCOs | | | | | Junior NCOs | | Enlisted |

=== Revolutionary Guard Corps ===
==== Commissioned officer ranks ====
The rank insignia of commissioned officers.

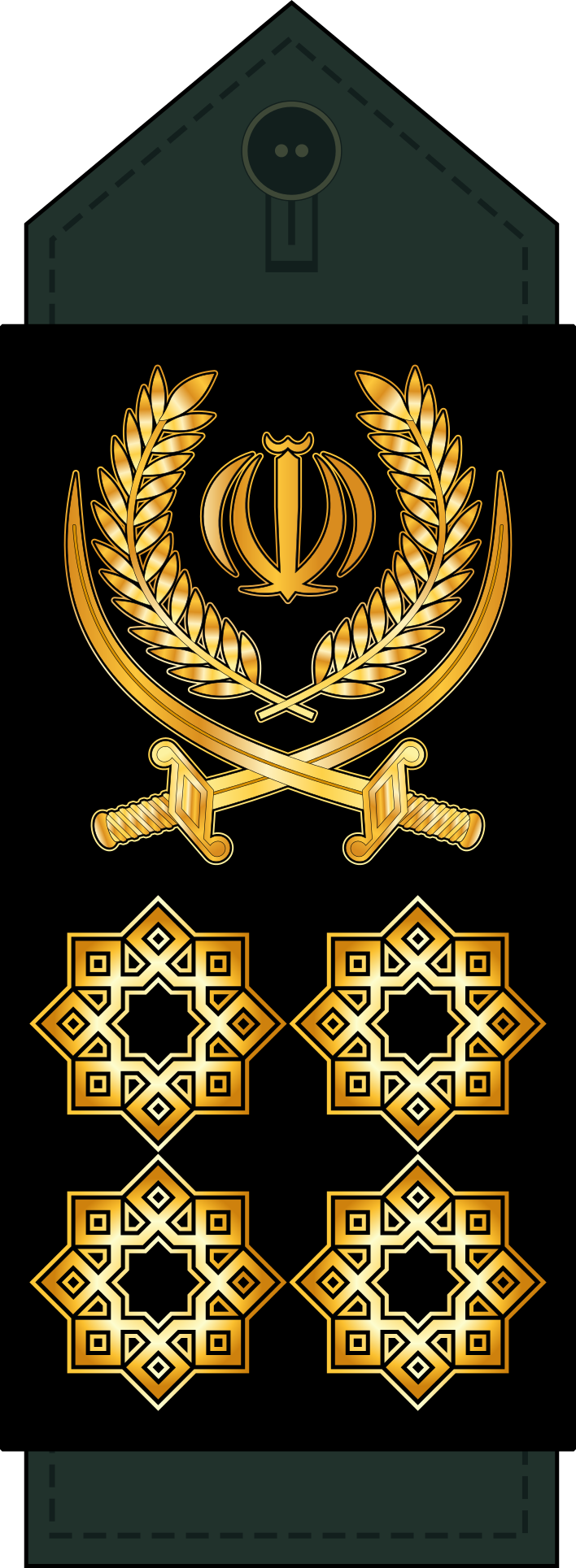
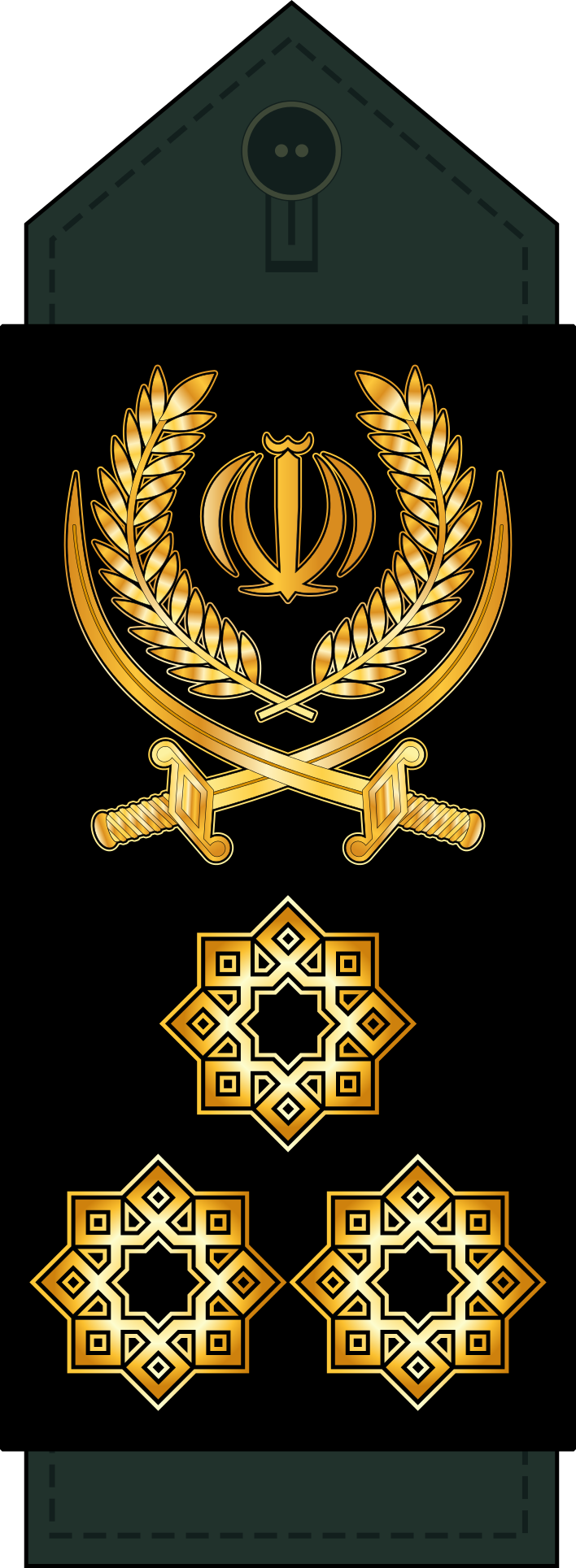
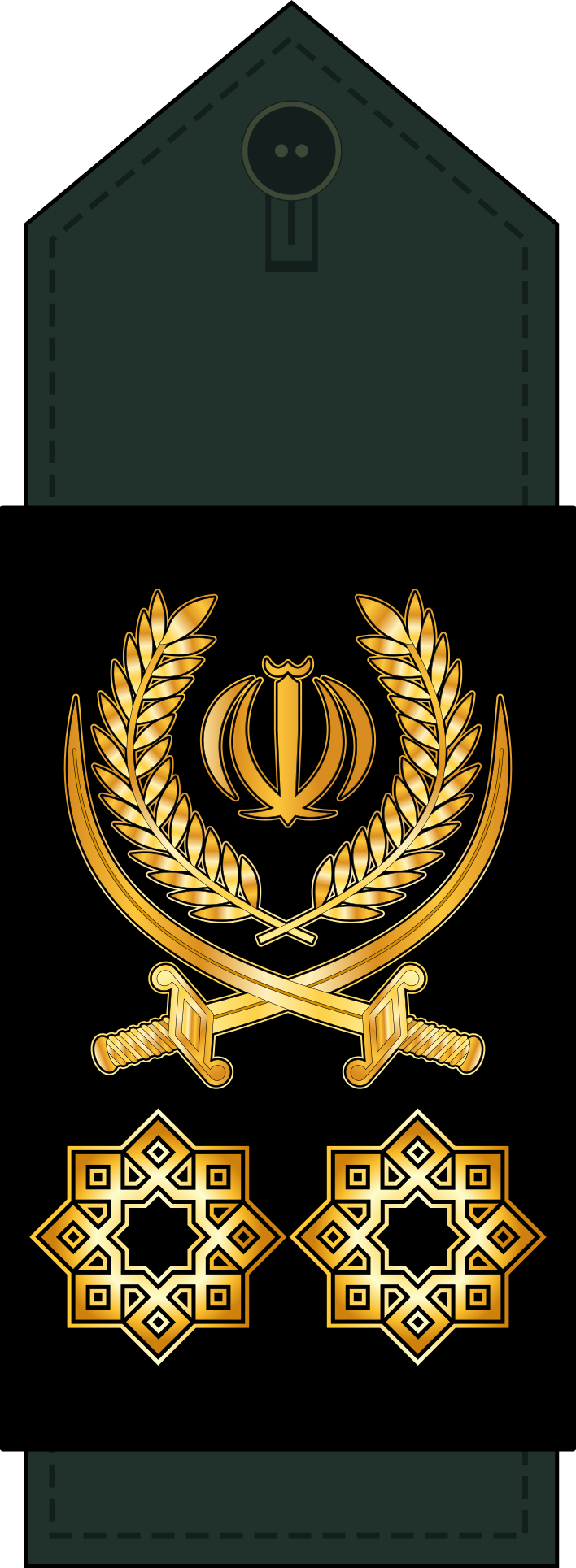
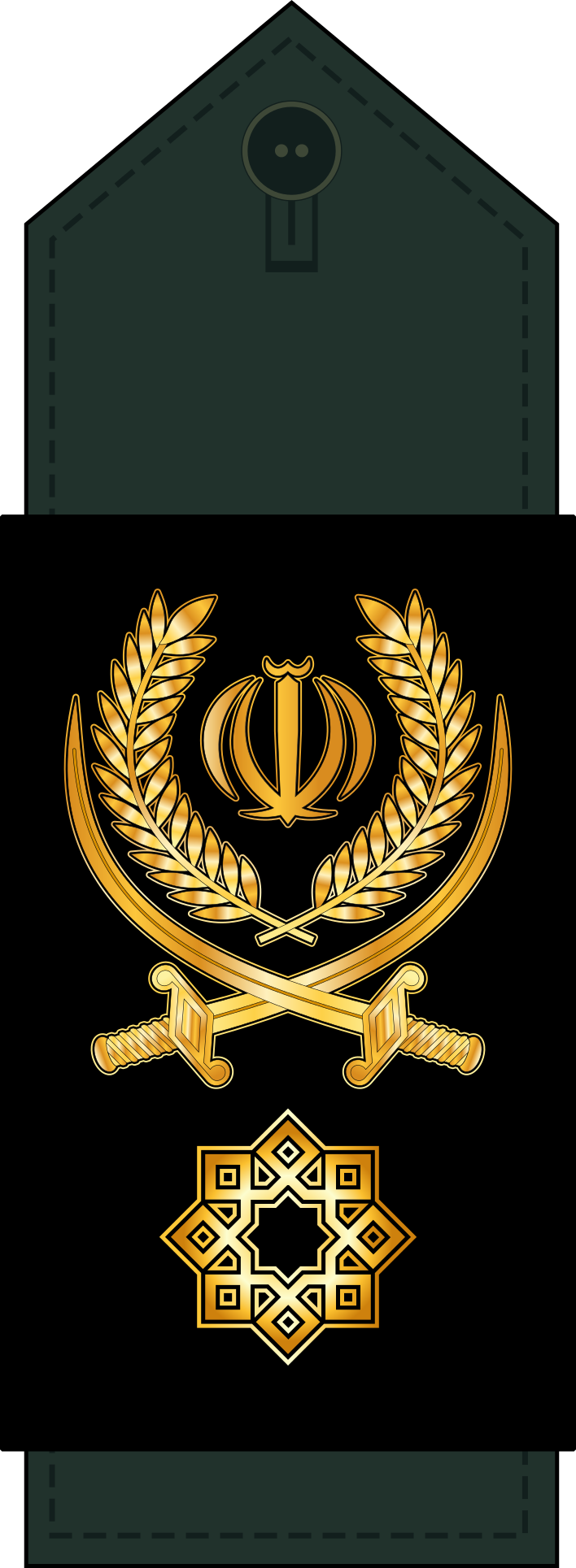
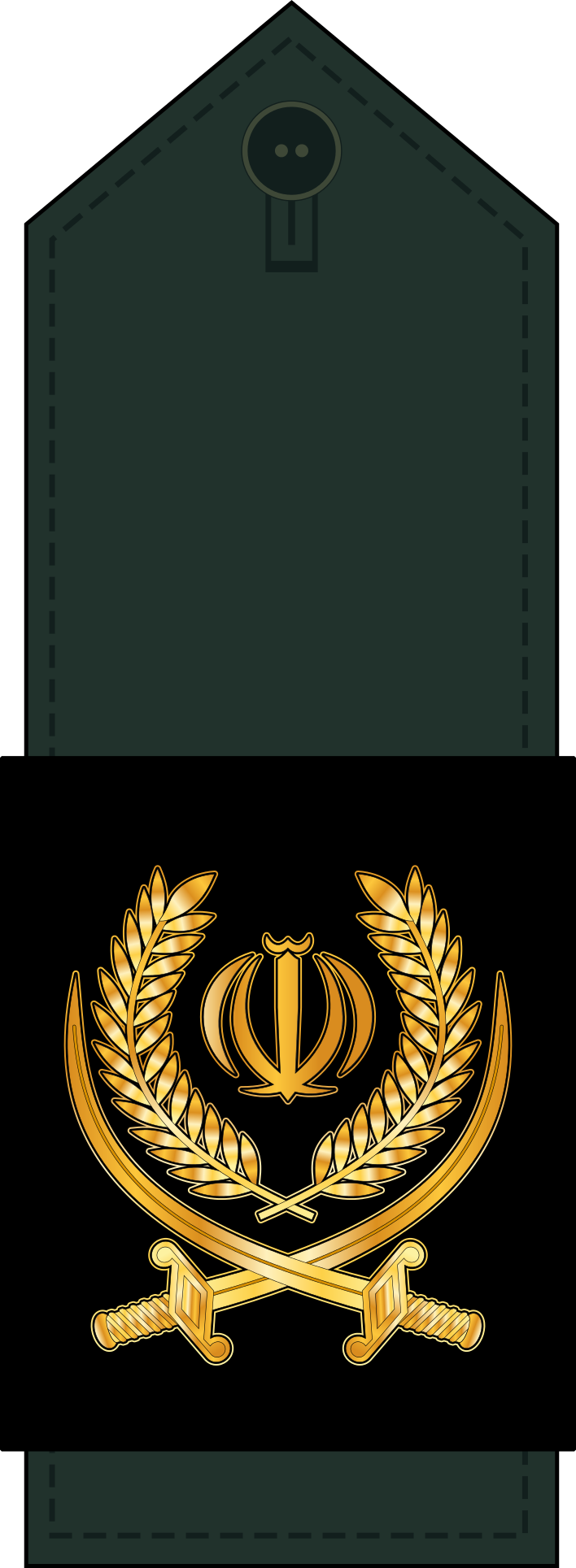
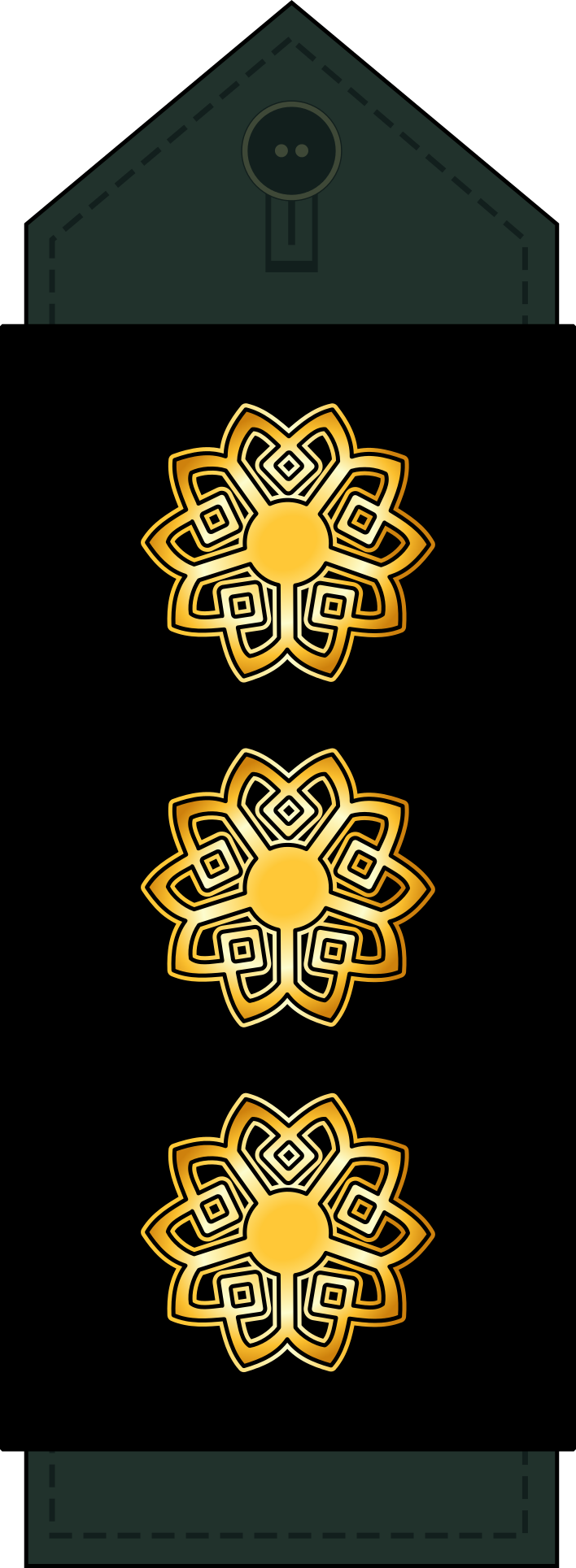
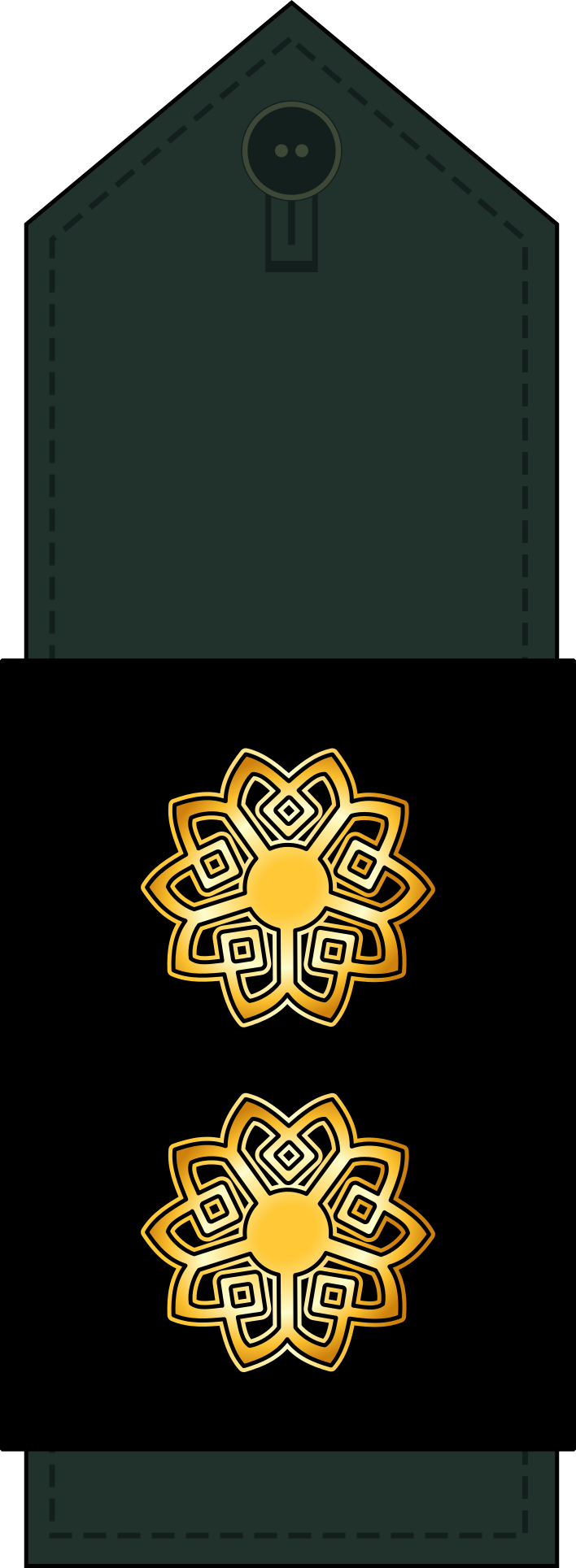
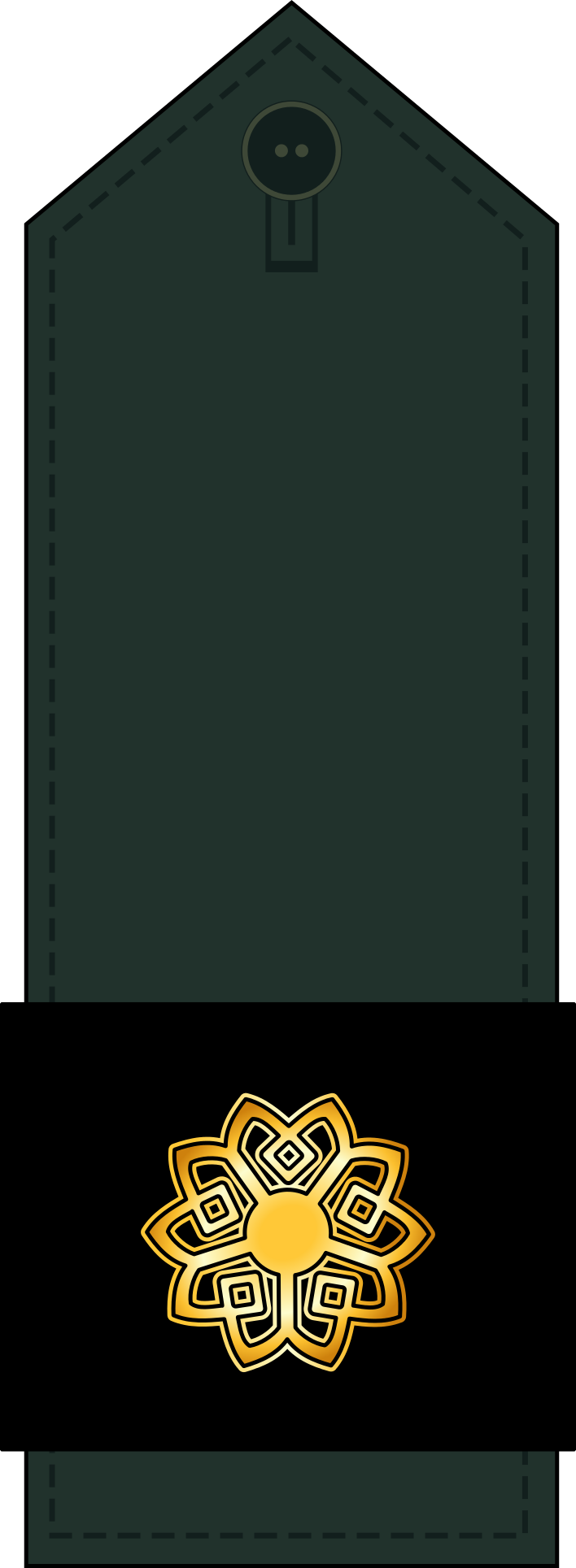
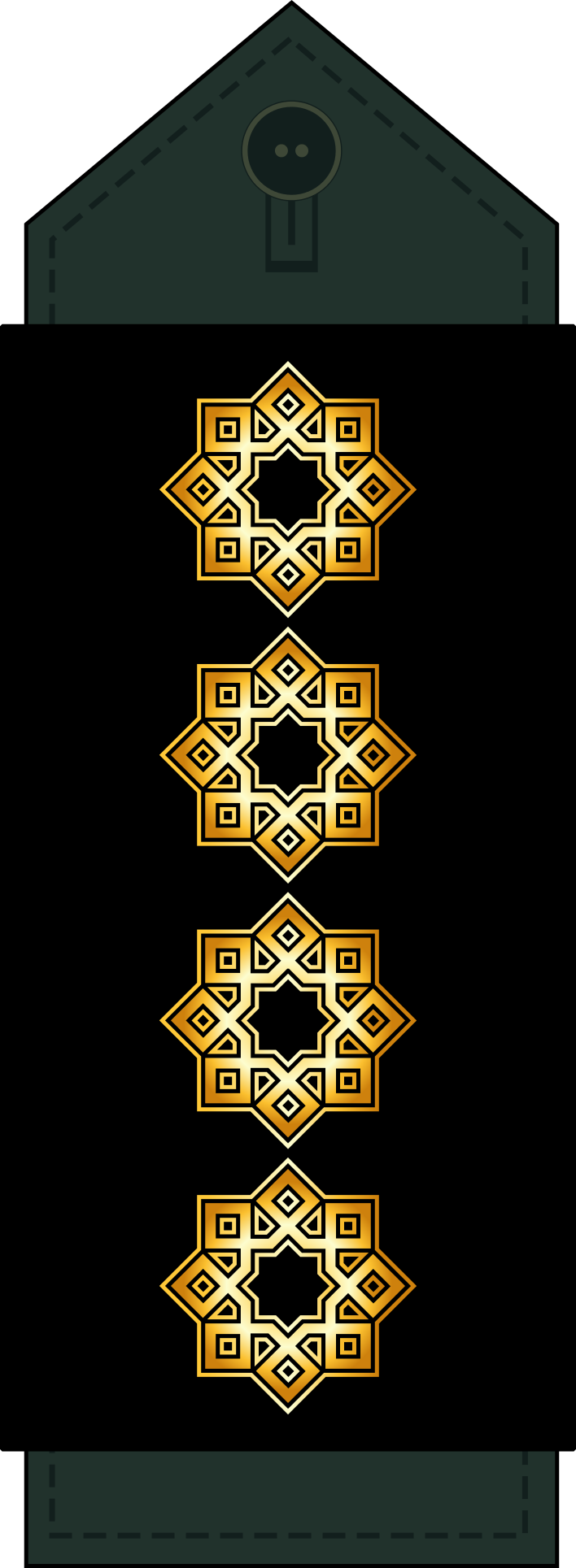
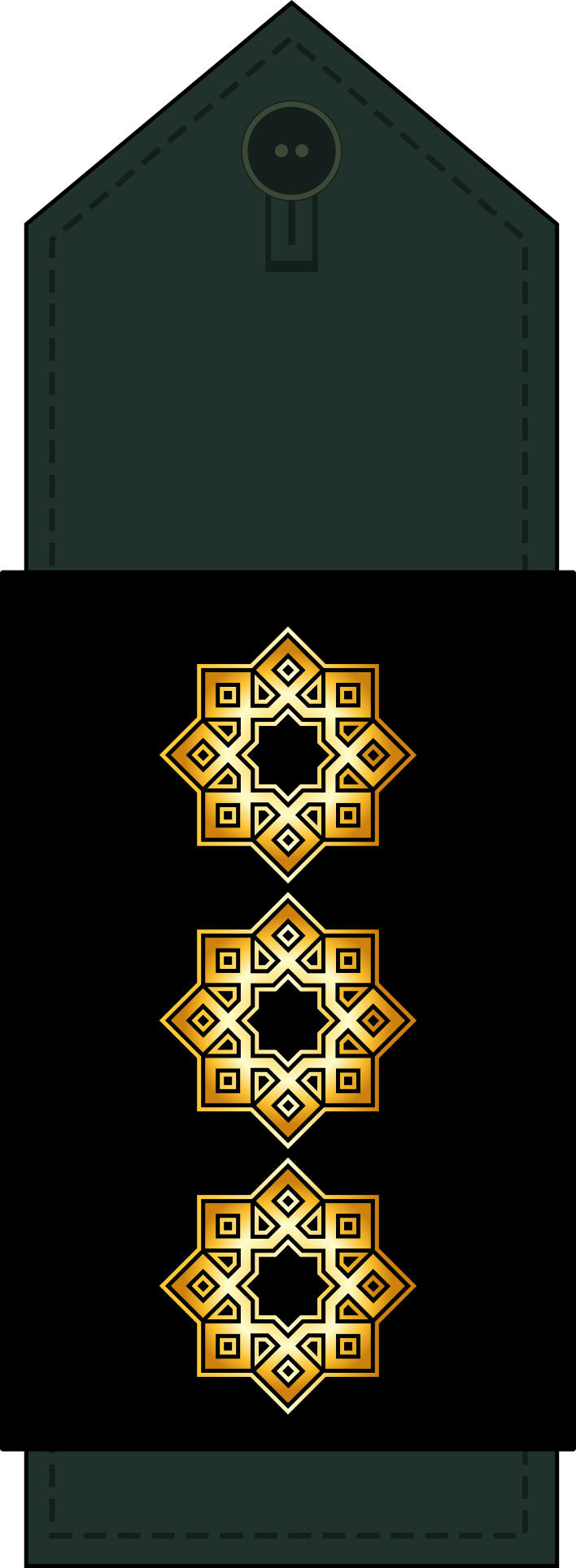
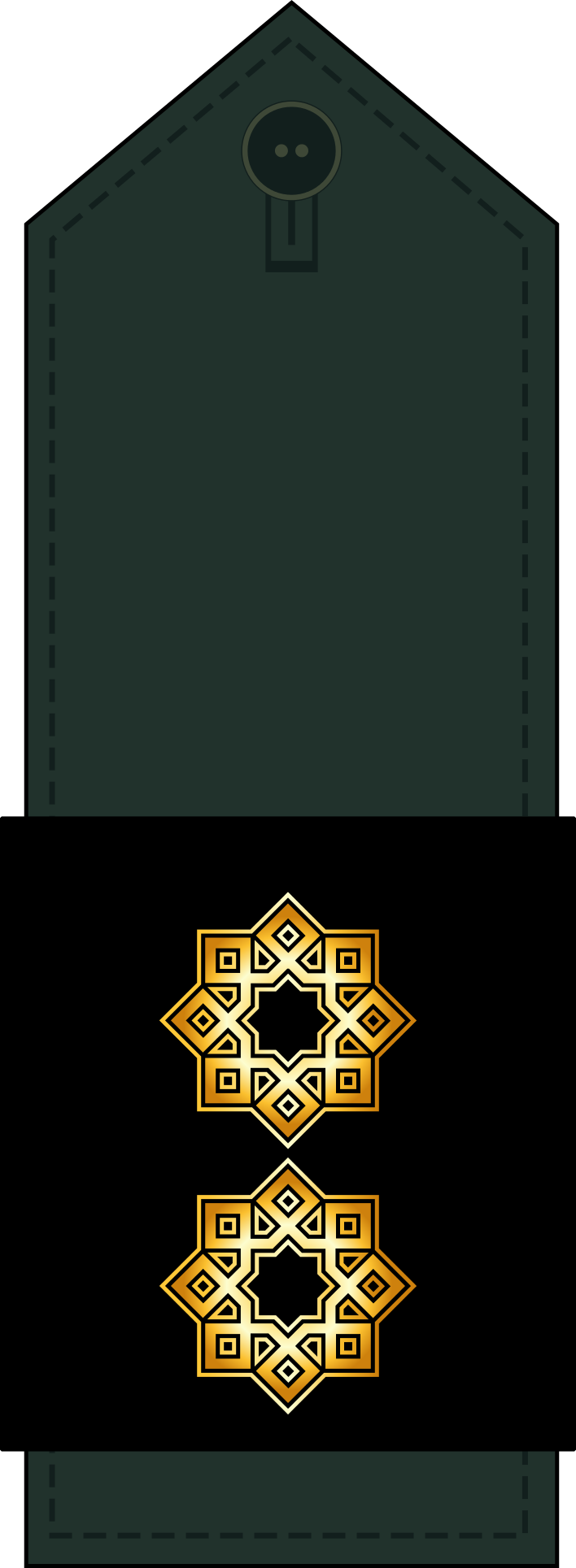
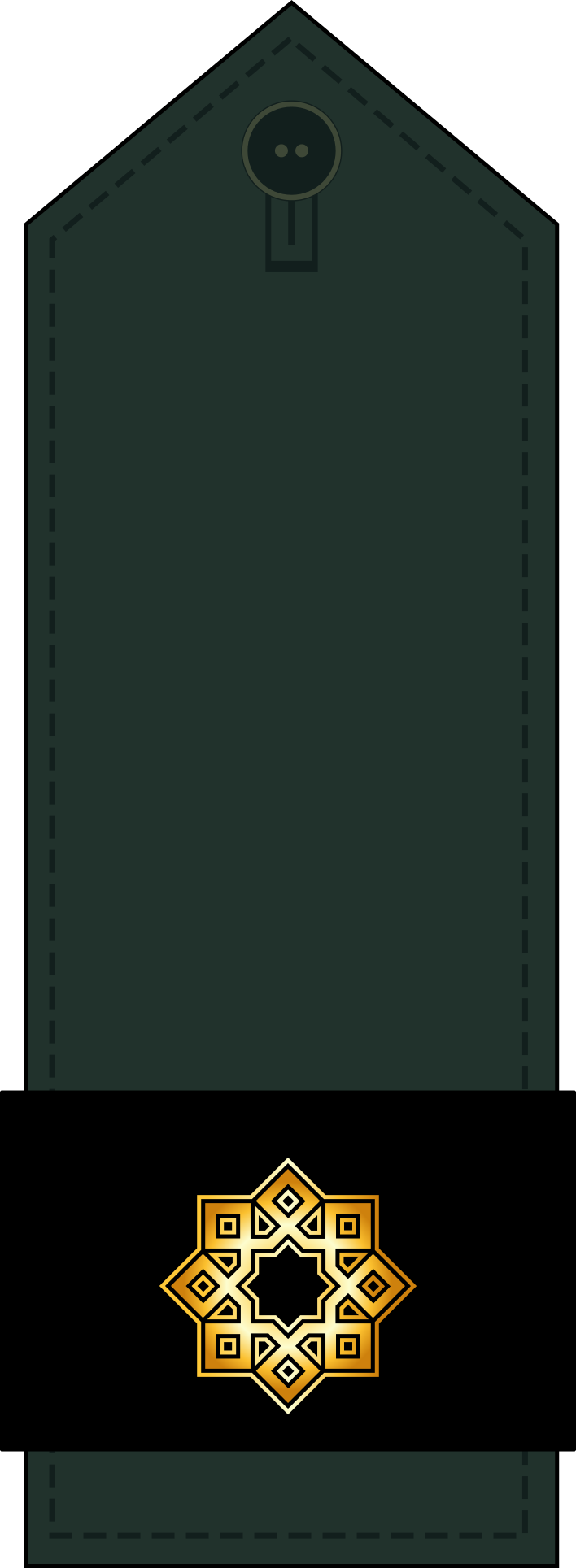
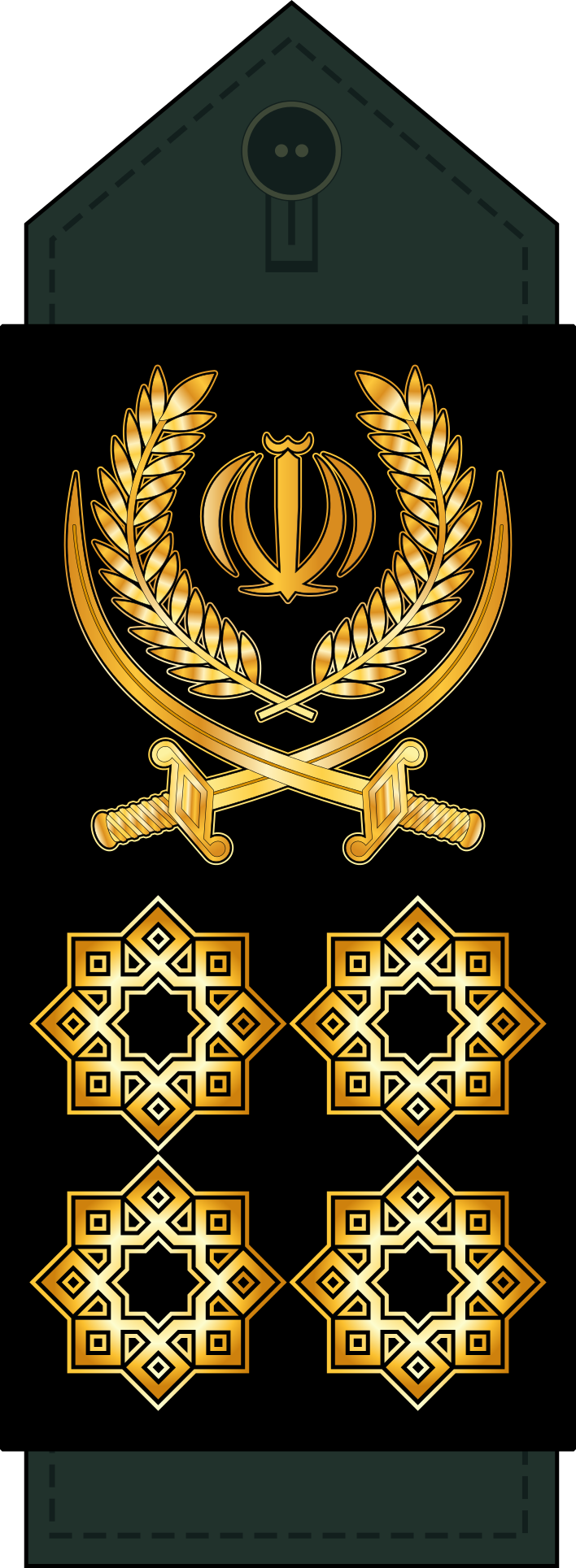
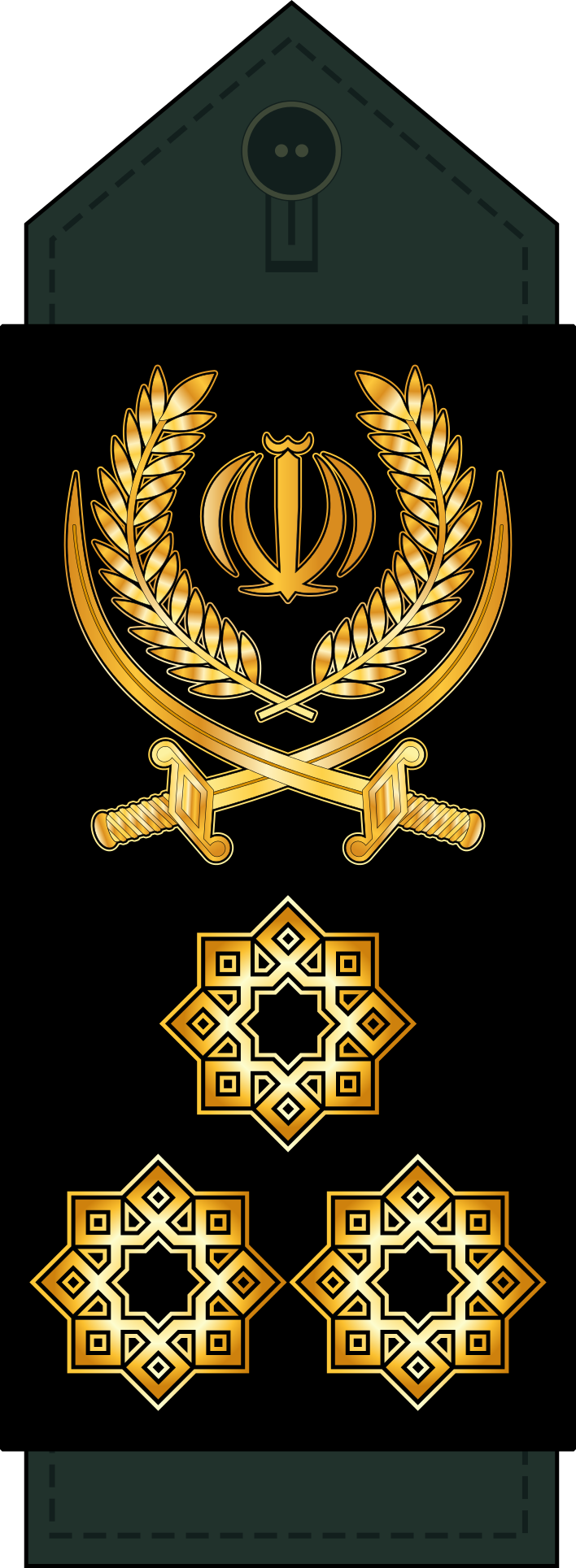
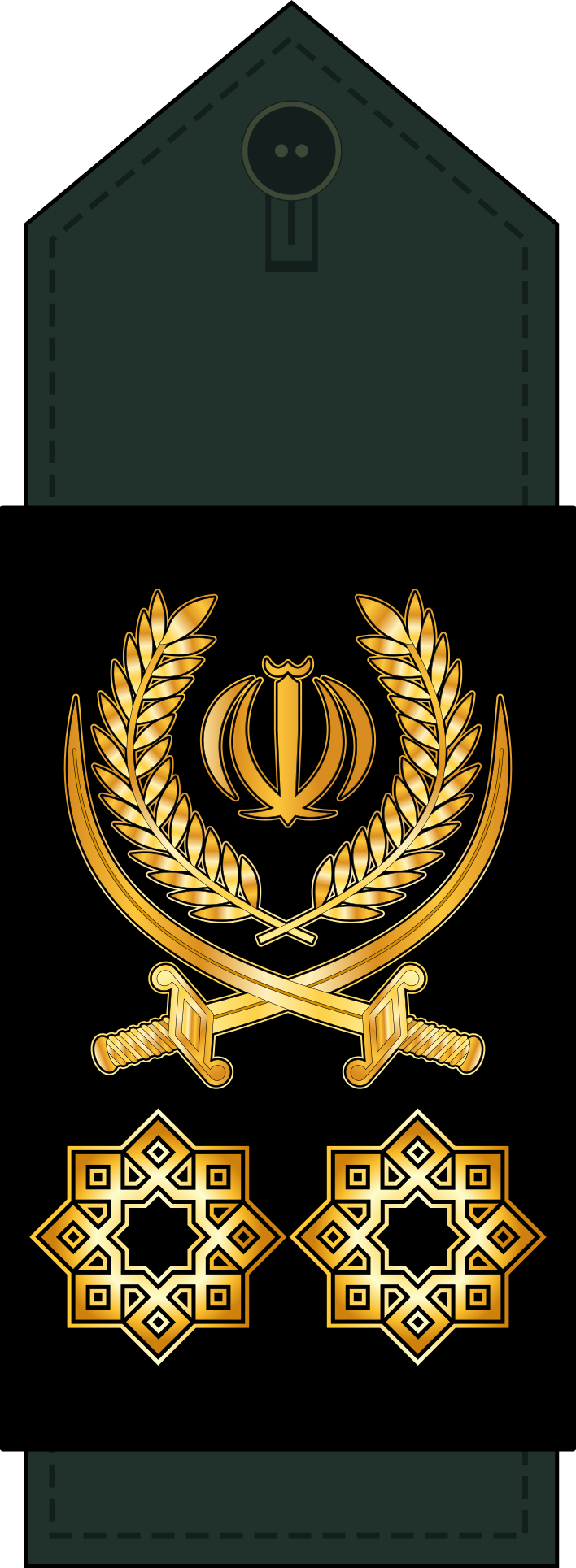
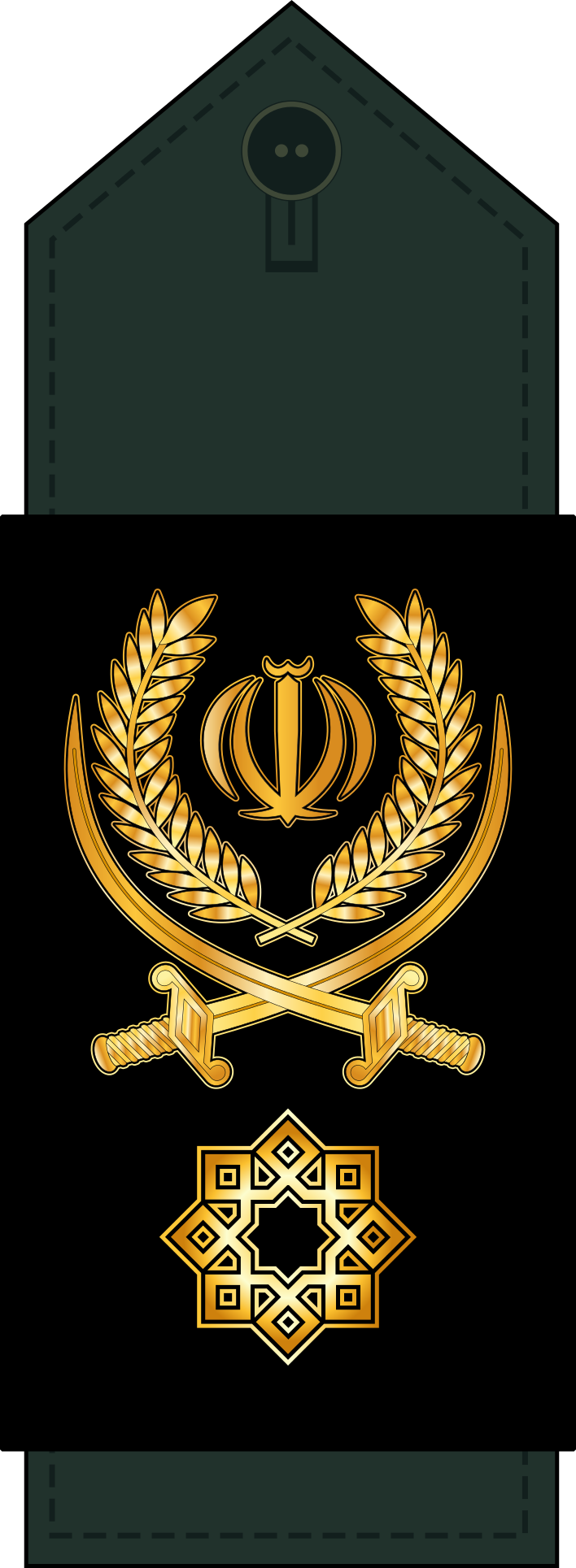
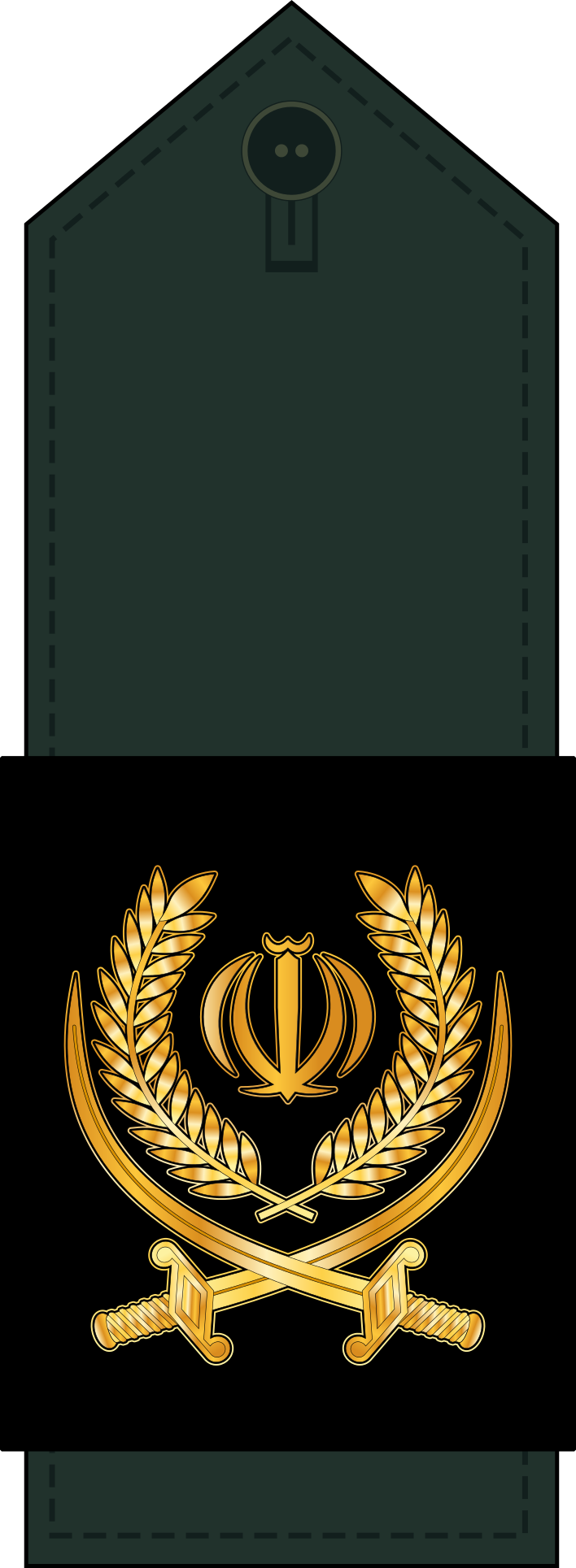
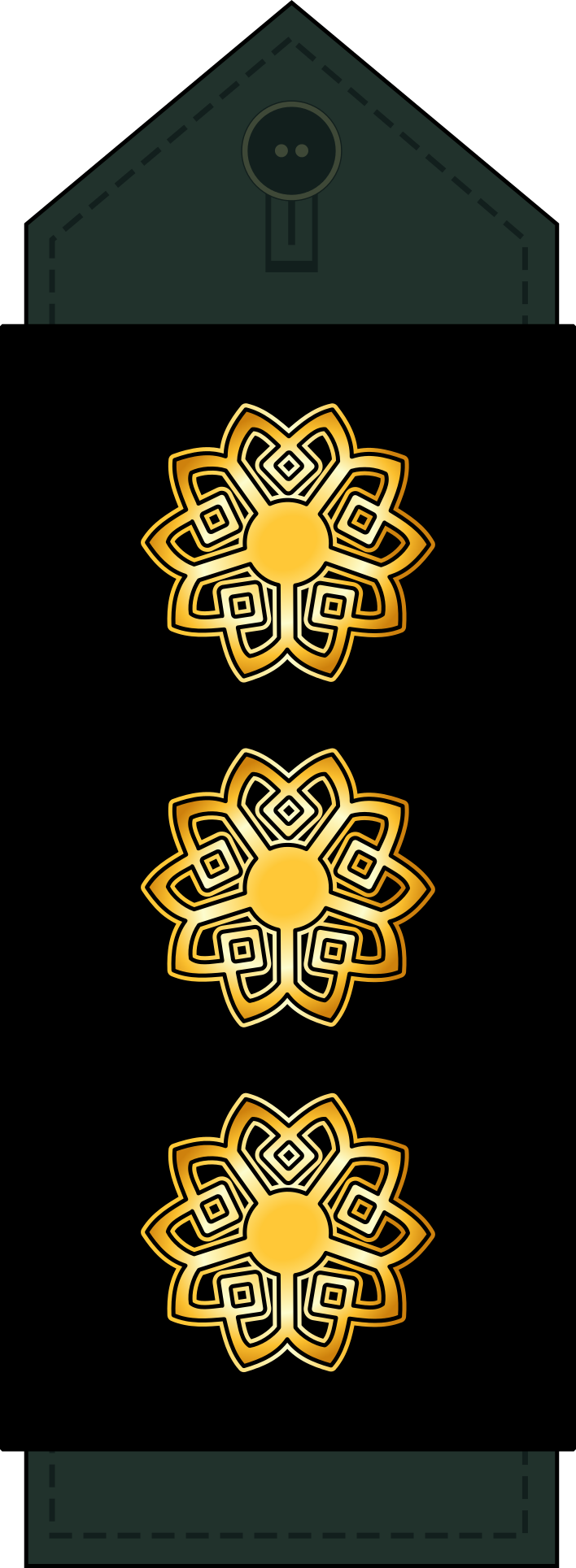
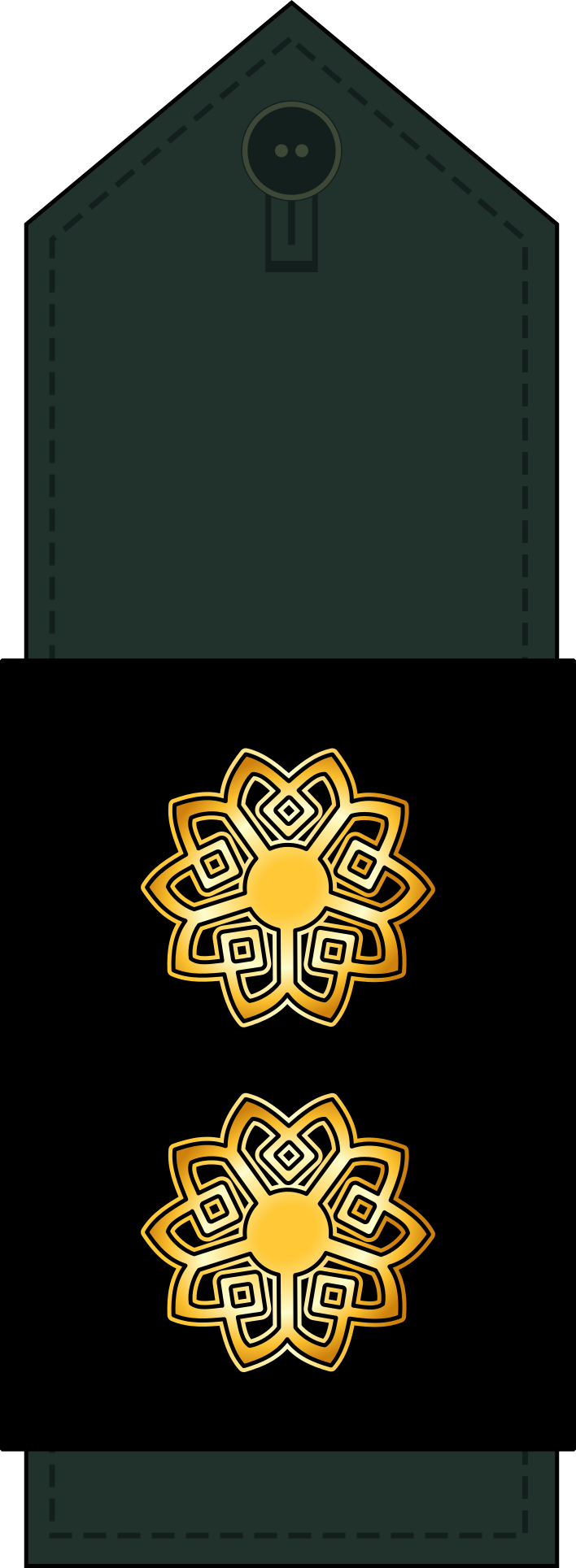
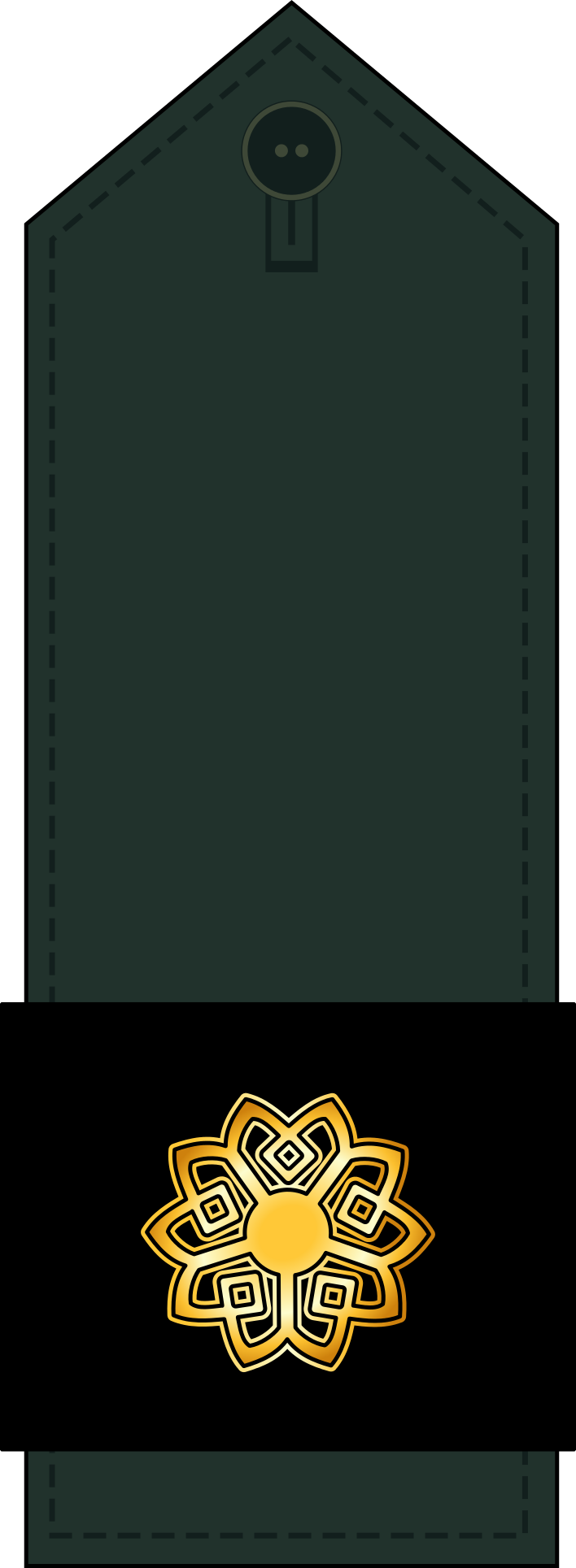
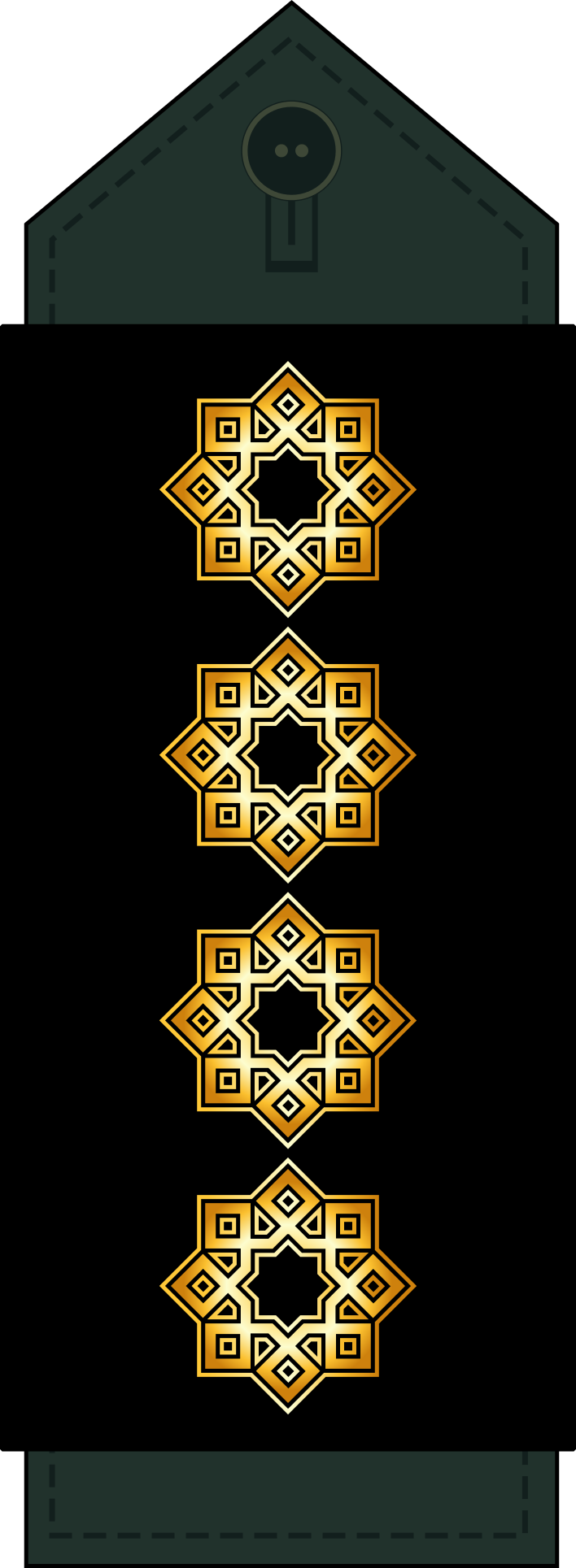
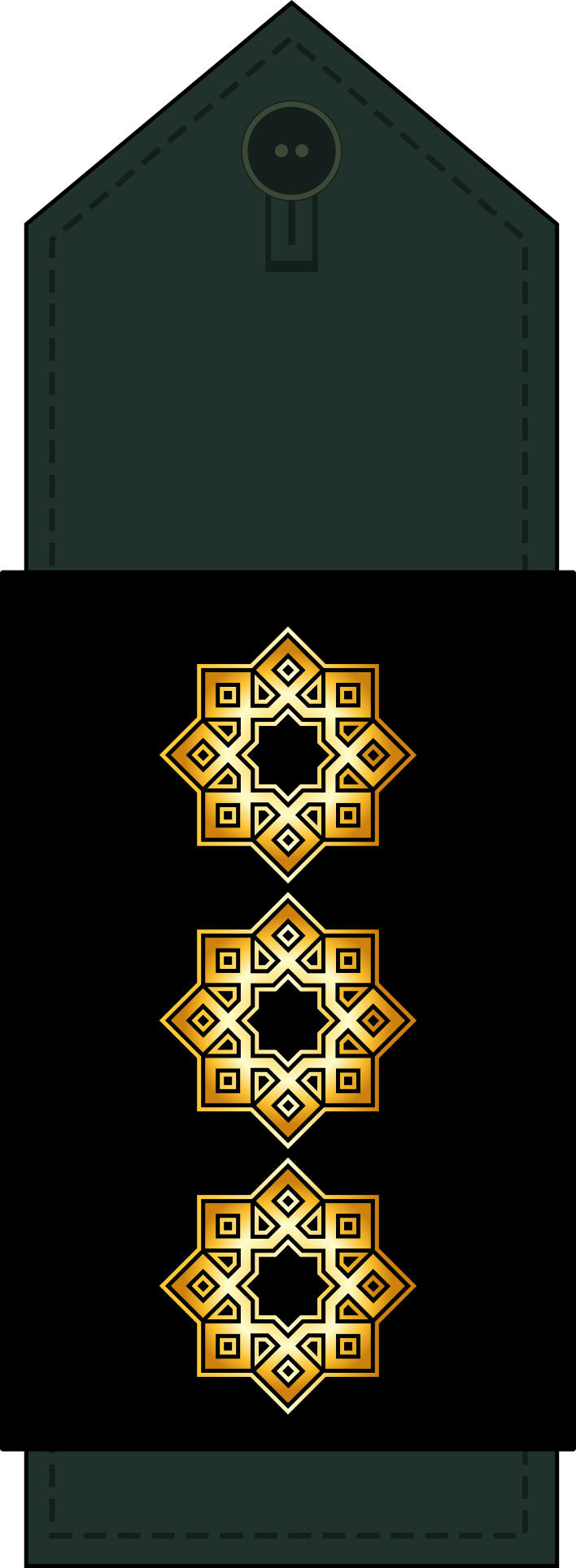
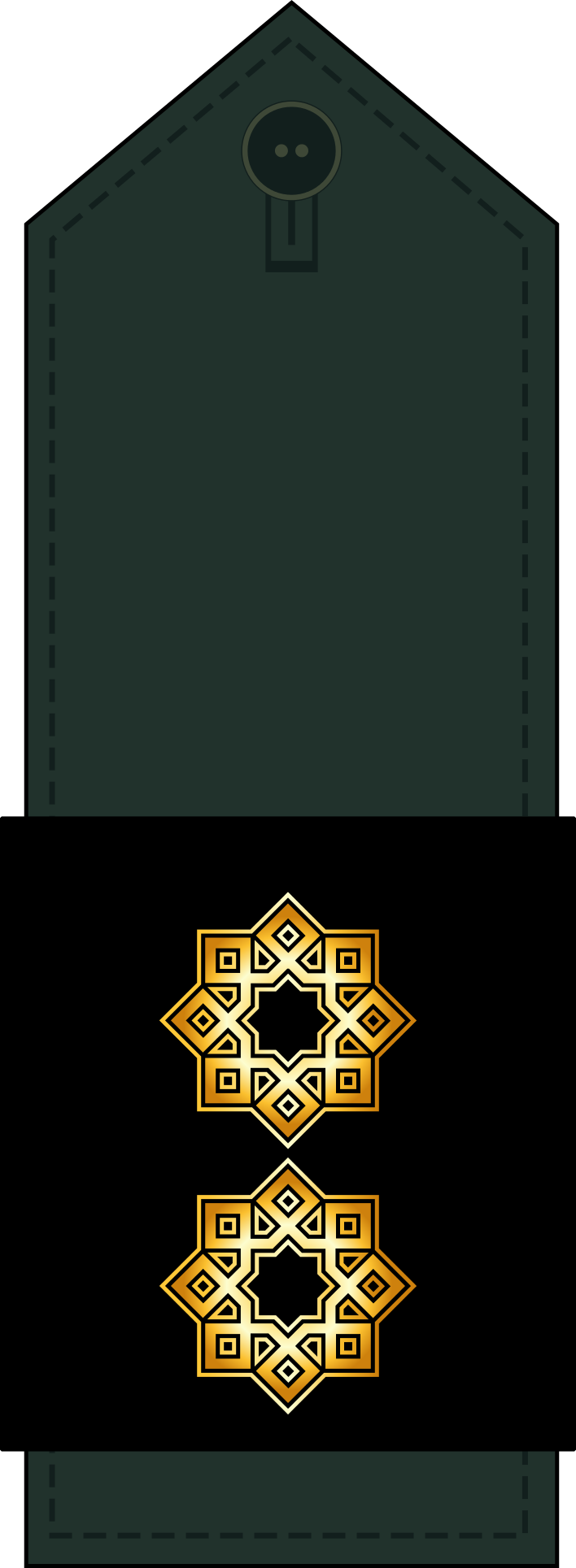
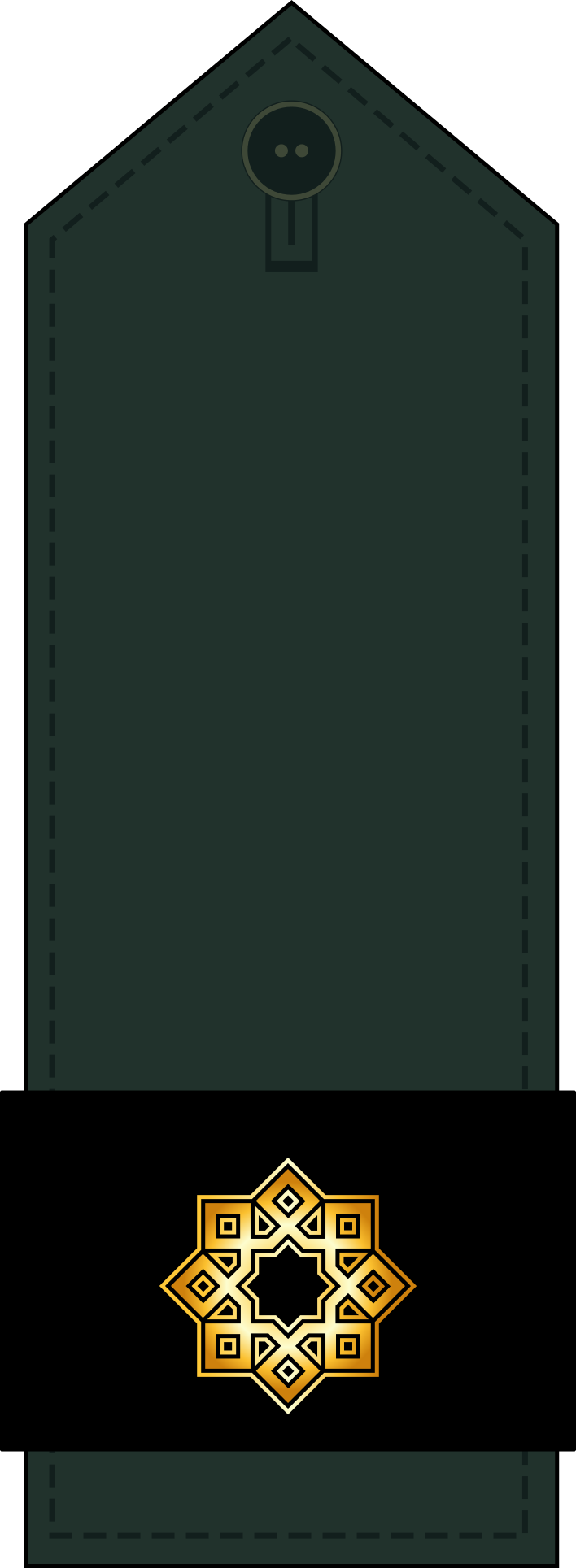
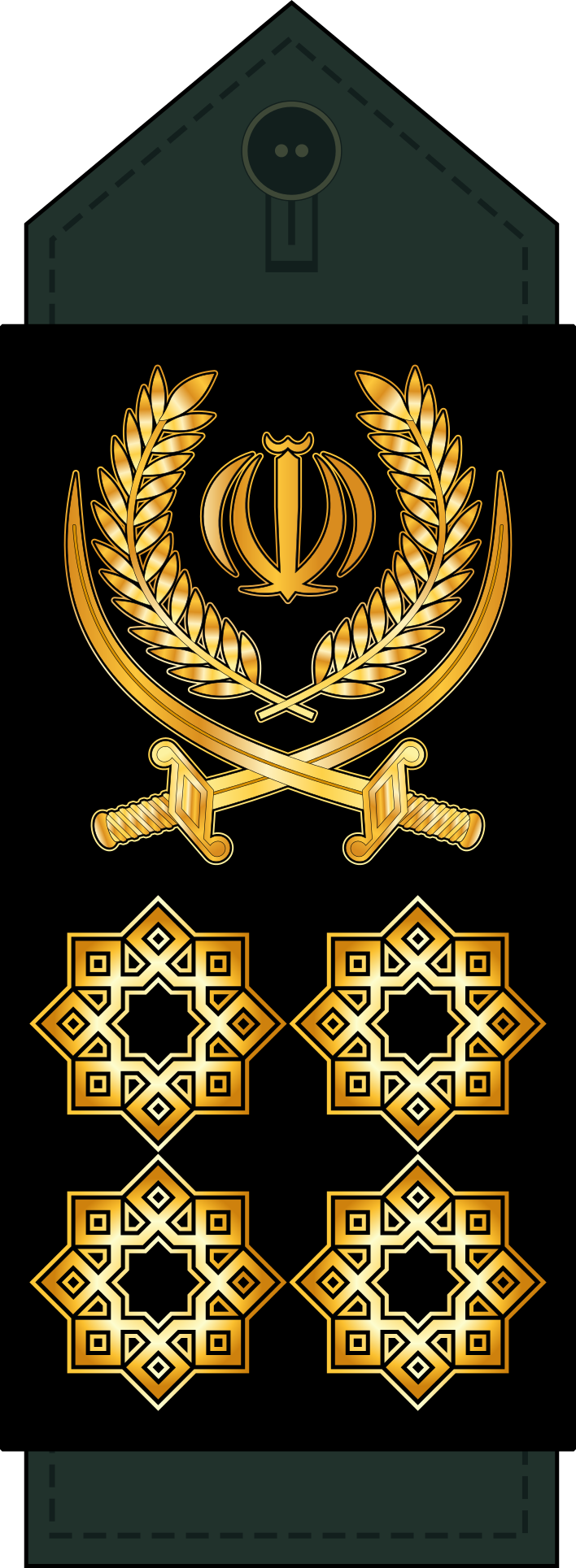
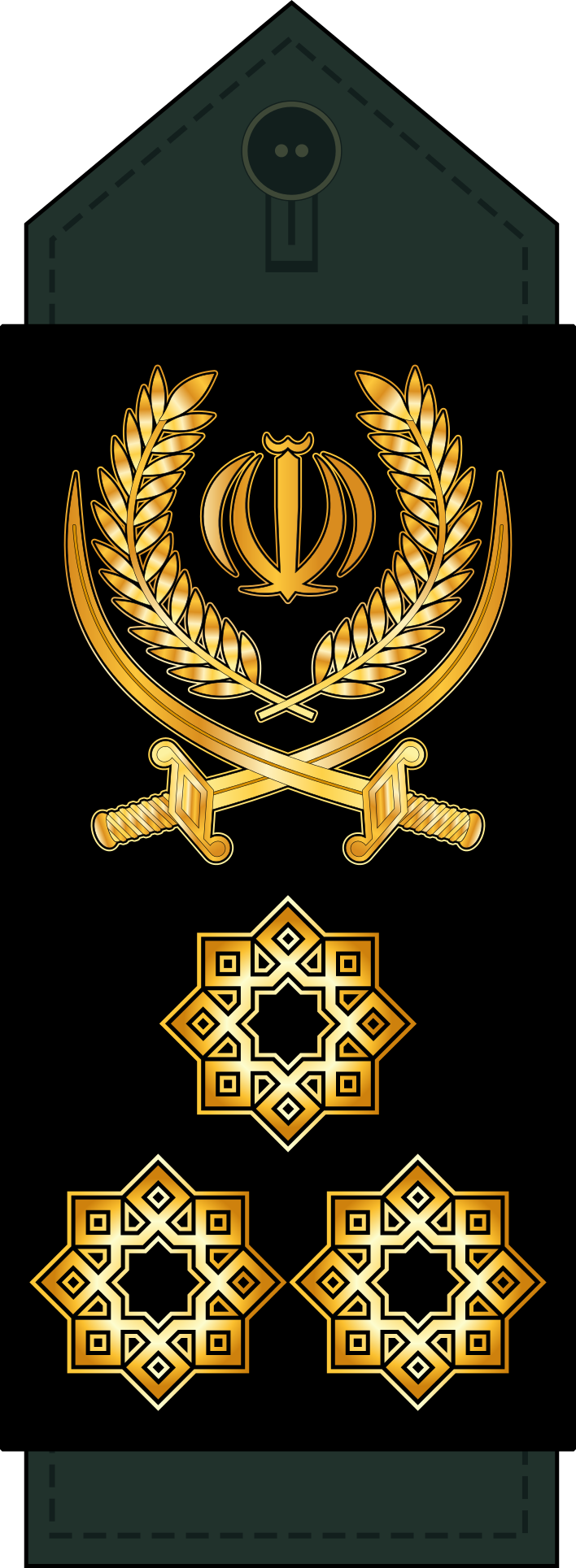
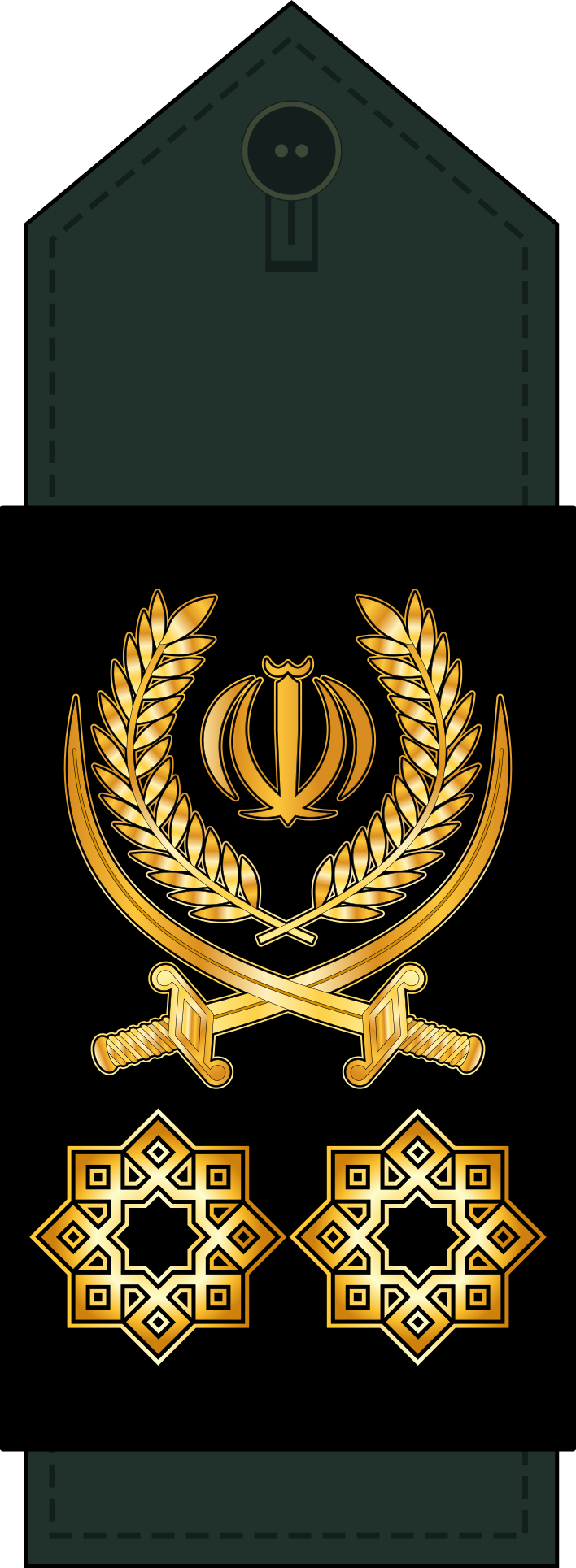
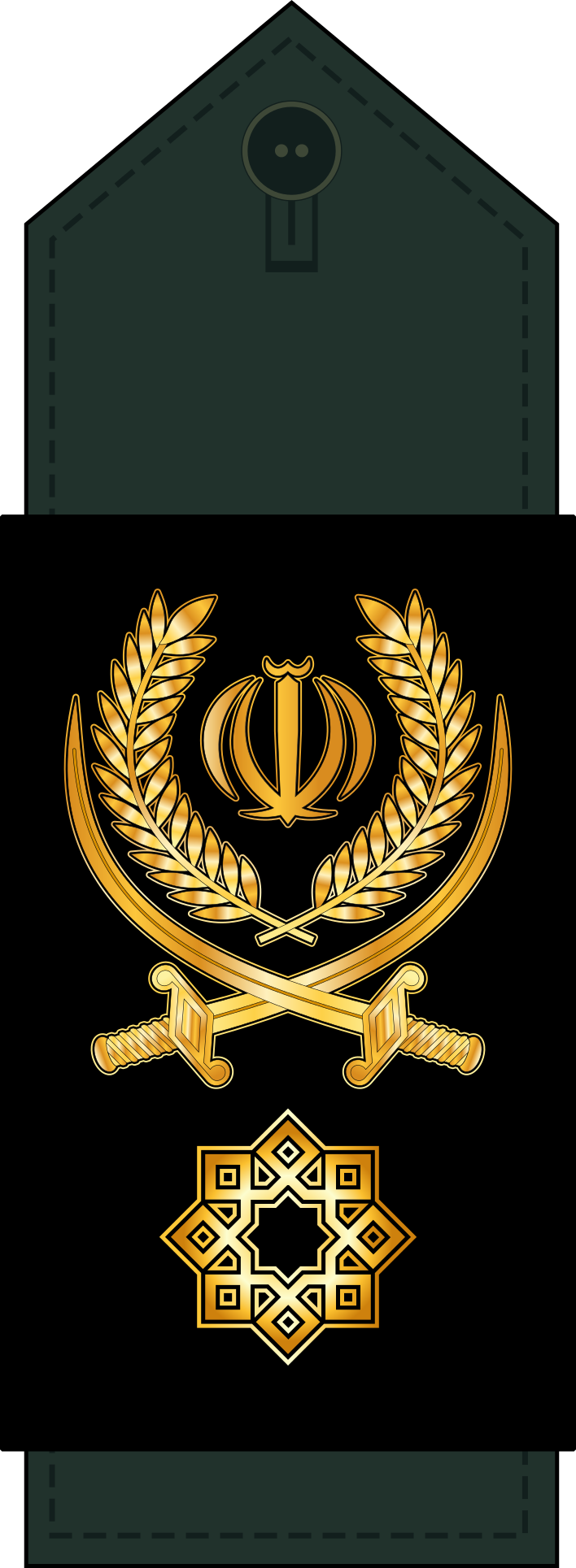
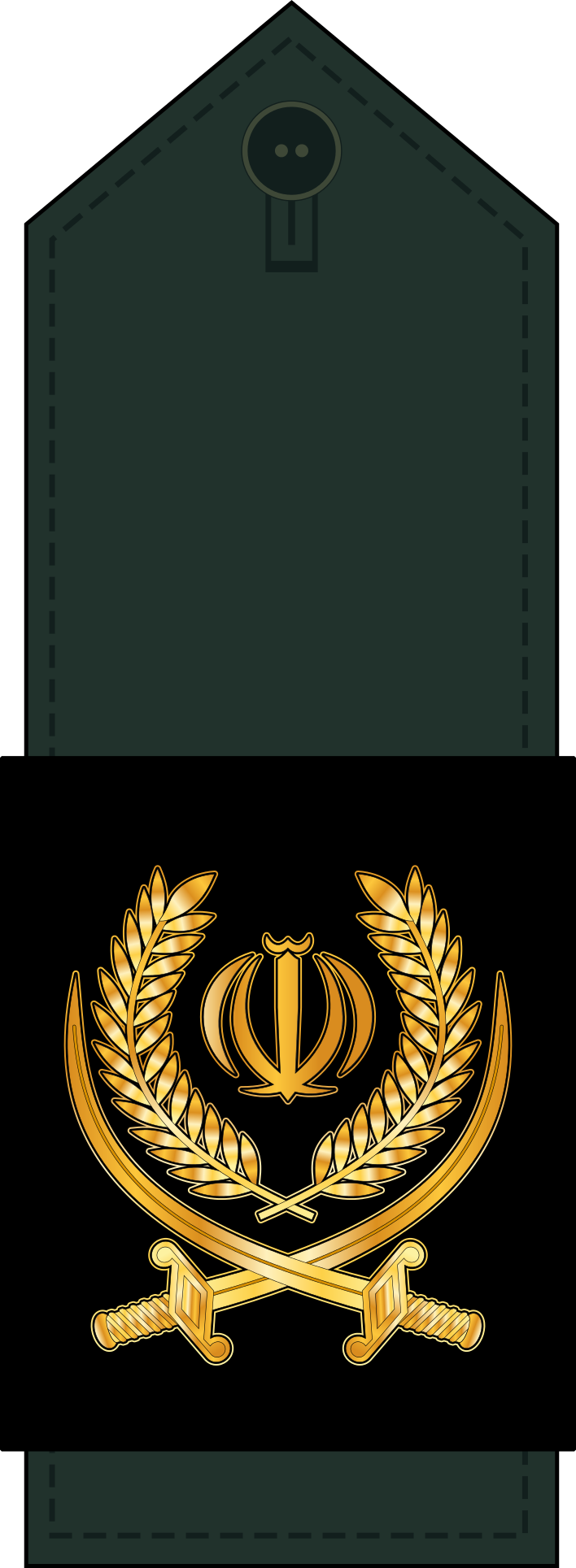
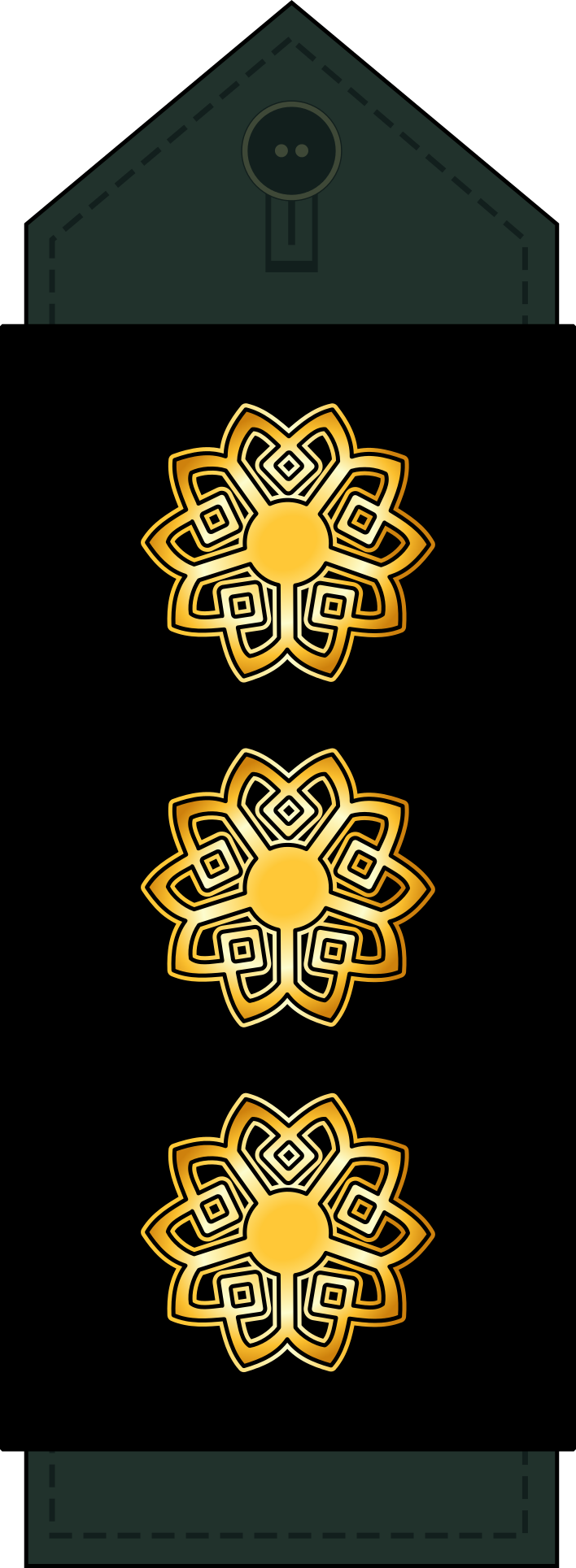
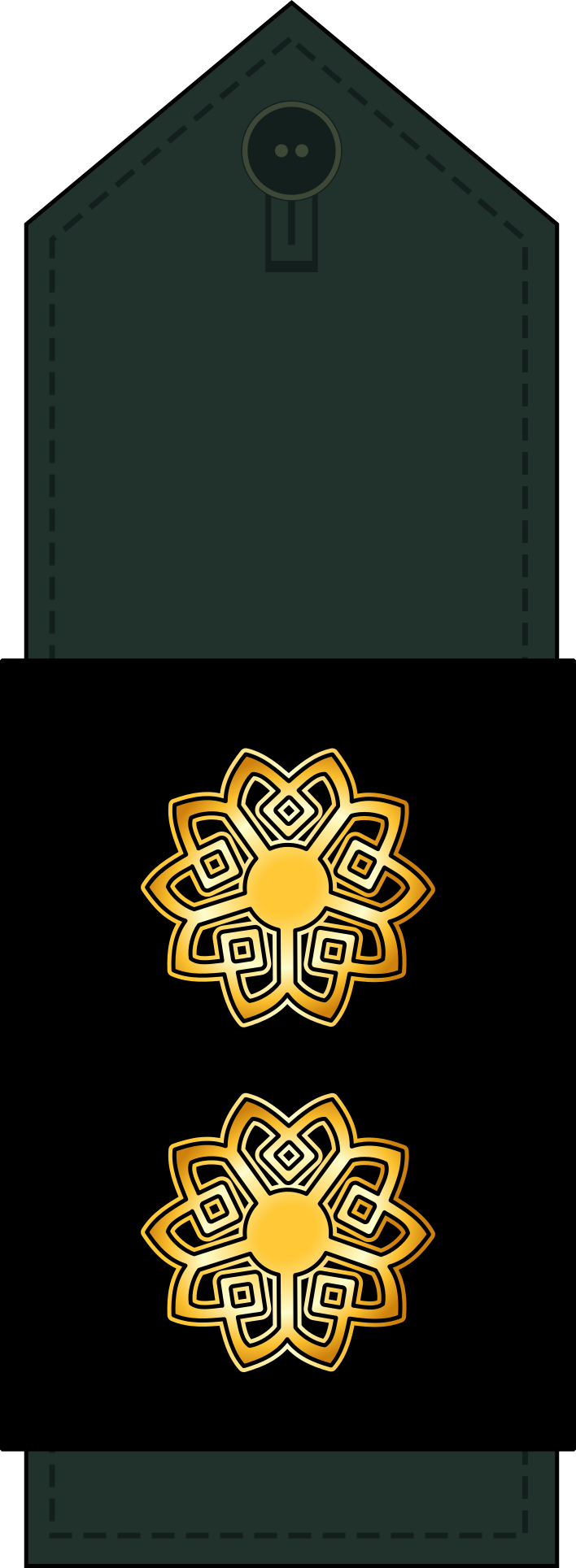
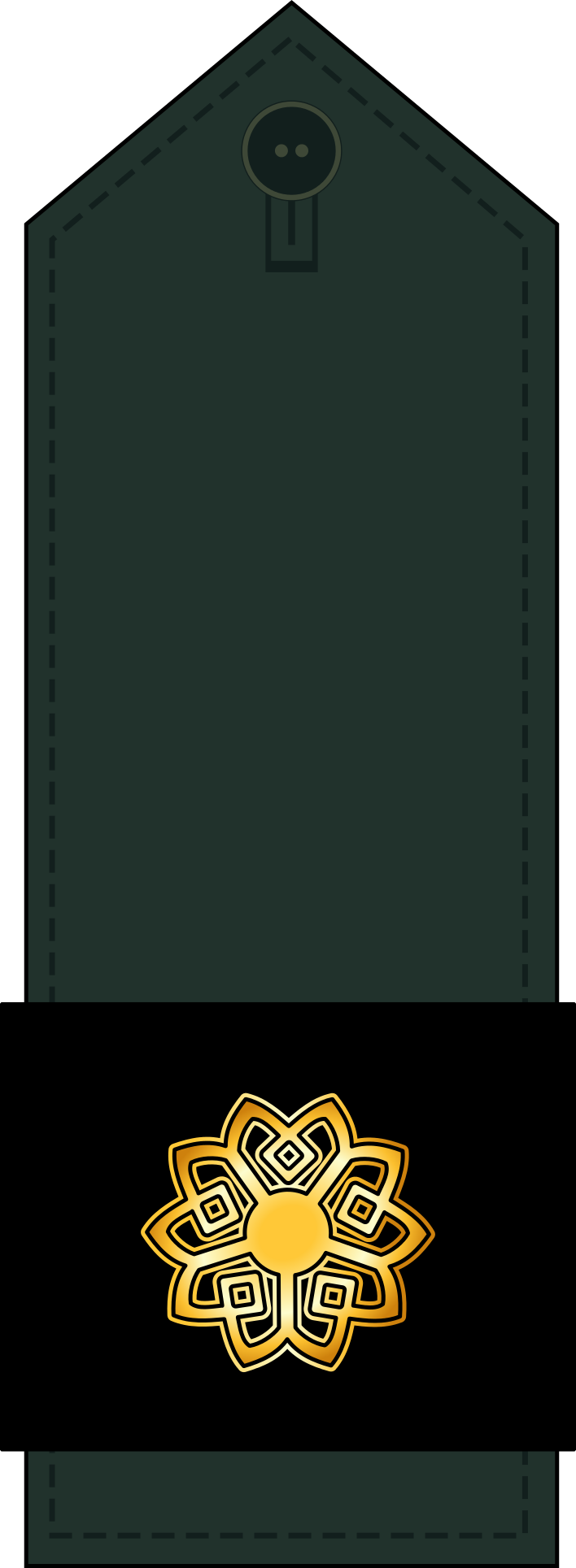
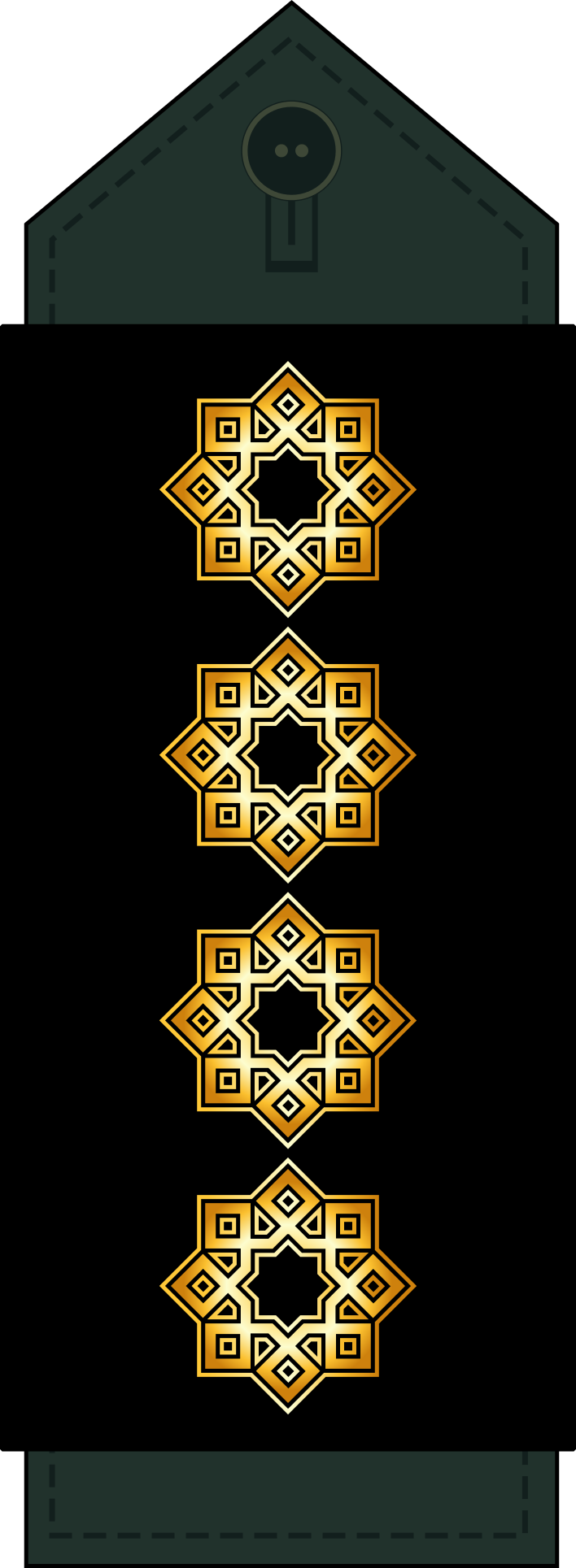
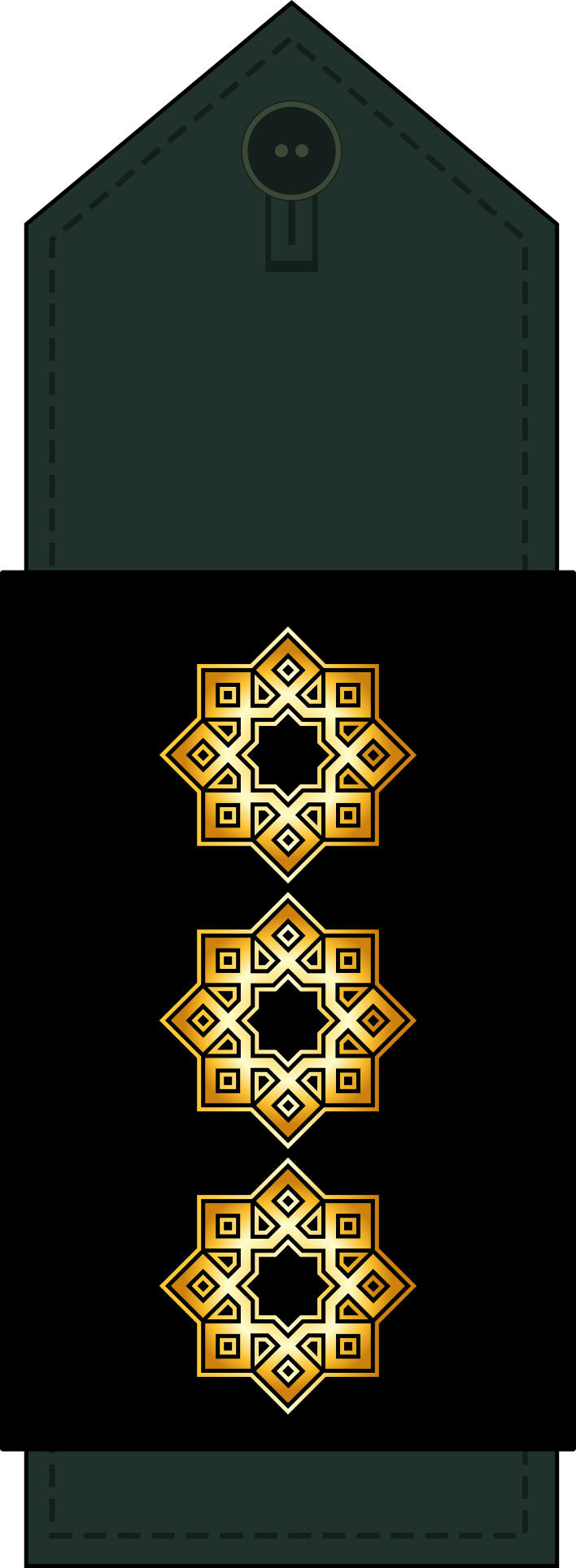
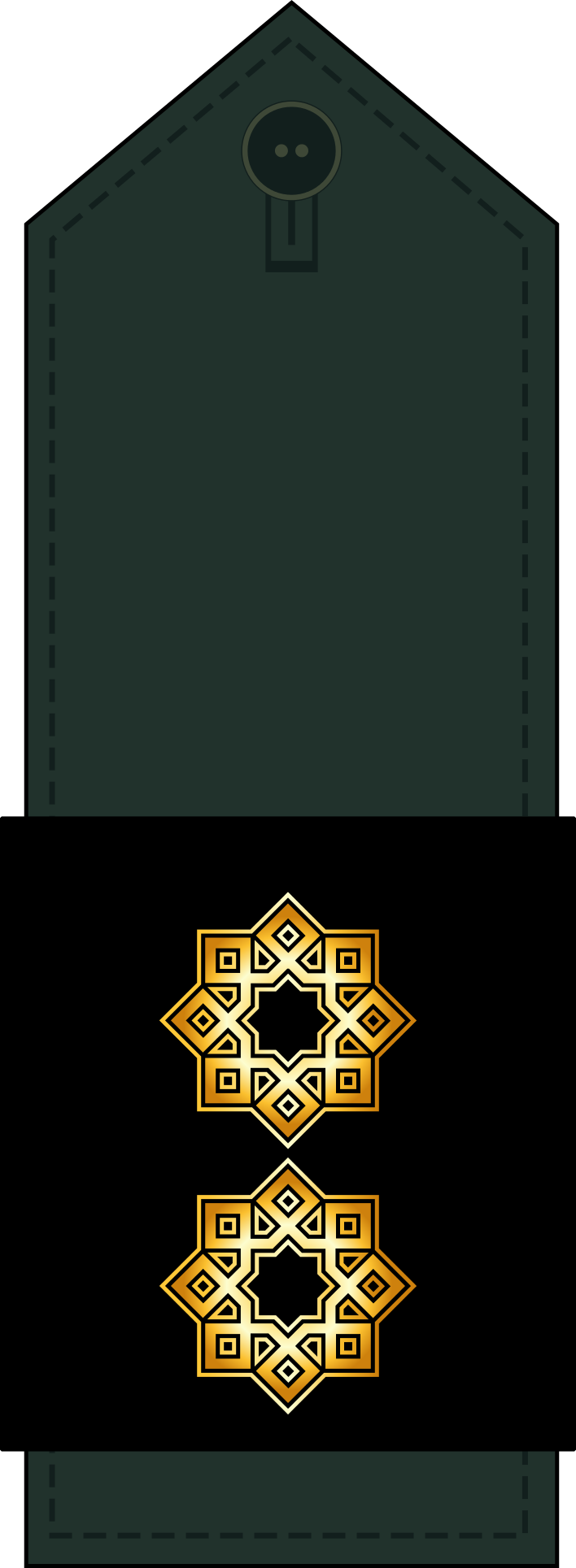
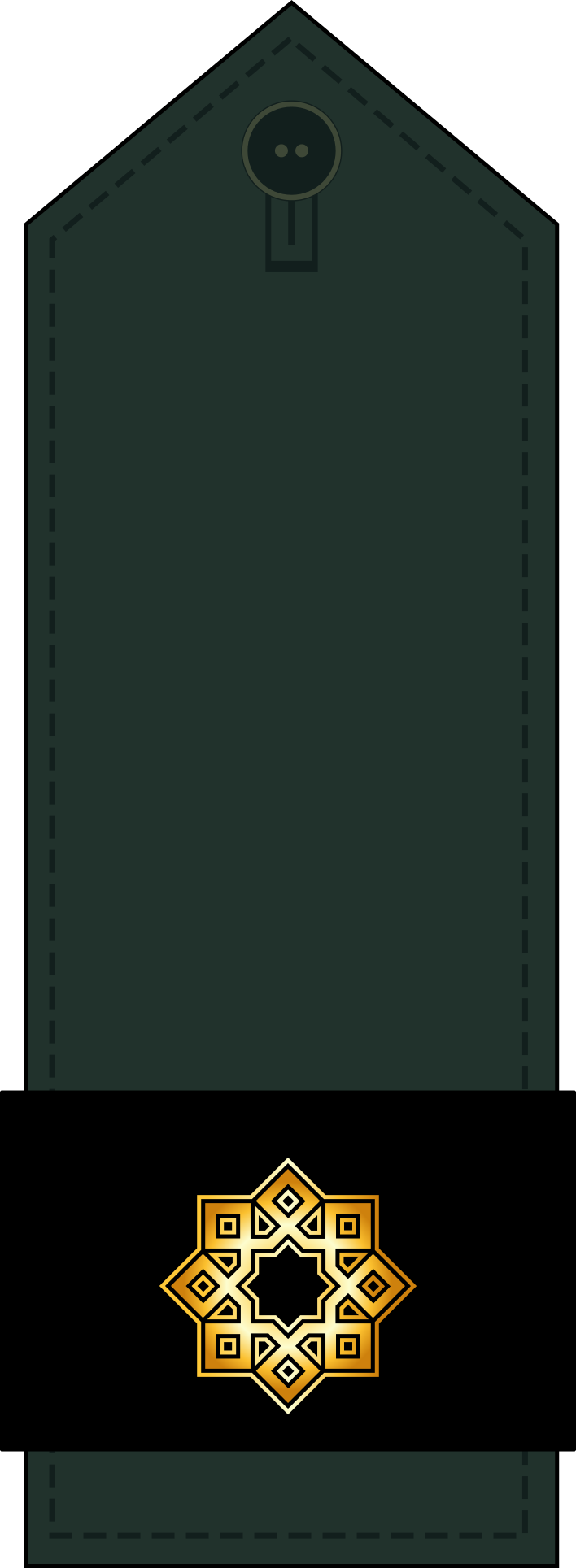
| Rank group | General / flag officers | | | | | Senior officers | | | Junior officers |
|---|---|---|---|---|---|---|---|---|---|---|---|---|
| IRGC Ground Forces |
| IRGC Ground Forces | ارتشبد پاسدار; Arteshbod pasdar | سپهبد پاسدار; Sepahbod pasdar | سرلشکر پاسدار; Sarlashkar pasdar | سرتیپ پاسدار; Sartip pasdar | سرتیپ دوم پاسدار; Sartip dovom pasdar | سرهنگ پاسدار; Sarhang pasdar | سرهنگ دوم پاسدار; Sarhang dovom pasdar | سرگرد پاسدار; Sargord pasdar | سروان پاسدار; Sarwan pasdar | ستوان یکم پاسدار; Sotwan yekom pasdar | ستوان دوم پاسدار; Sotwan dovom pasdar | ستوان سوم پاسدار; Sotwan sevom pasdar |
| IRGC Navy |
| IRGC Navy | دریابد پاسدار; Daryabod pasdar | دریاسالار پاسدار; Dryasalar pasdar | دریابان پاسدار; Daryaban pasdar | دریادار پاسدار; Daryadar pasdar | دریادار دوم پاسدار; Daryadar dome pasdar | ناوسالار یکم; Nakhuda yakam pasdar | ناوسالار دوم; Nakhuda dome pasdar | ناوسالار سوم; Nakhuda some pasdar | ناوسروان پاسدار; Nausroan pasdar | ناوبان یکم پاسدار; Nauban yakam pasdar | ناوبان دوم پاسدار; Nauban dome pasdar | ناوبان سوم پاسدار; Nauban some pasdar |
| IRGC Aerospace Force |
| IRGC Aerospace Force | ارتشبد پاسدار; Arteshbod pasdar | سپهبد پاسدار; Sepahbod pasdar | سرلشکر پاسدار; Sarlashkar pasdar | سرتیپ پاسدار; Sartip pasdar | سرتیپ دوم پاسدار; Sartip dovom pasdar | سرهنگ پاسدار; Sarhang pasdar | سرهنگ دوم پاسدار; Sarhang dovom pasdar | سرگرد پاسدار; Sargord pasdar | سروان پاسدار; Sarwan pasdar | ستوان یکم پاسدار; Sotwan yekom pasdar | ستوان دوم پاسدار; Sotwan dovom pasdar | ستوان سوم پاسدار; Sotwan sevom pasdar |
| Rank group | General / flag officers | | | | | Senior officers | | | Junior officers |

==== Student officer ranks ====
| Rank group | 4th year | 3rd year | 2nd year | 1st year |
|---|---|---|---|---|
| Islamic Revolutionary Guard Corps; Imam Hossein University |

==== Other ranks ====
The rank insignia of non-commissioned officers and enlisted personnel.

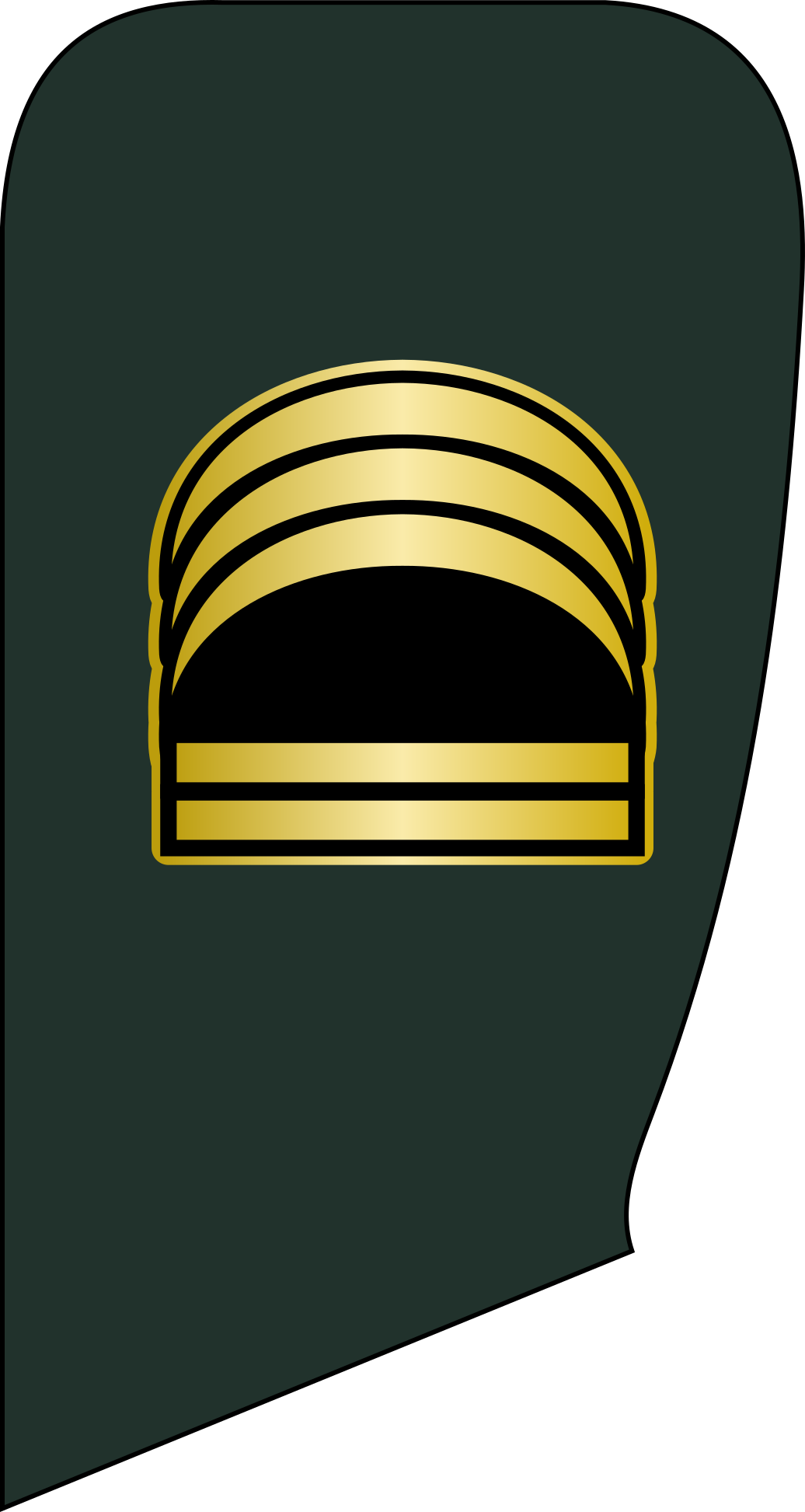
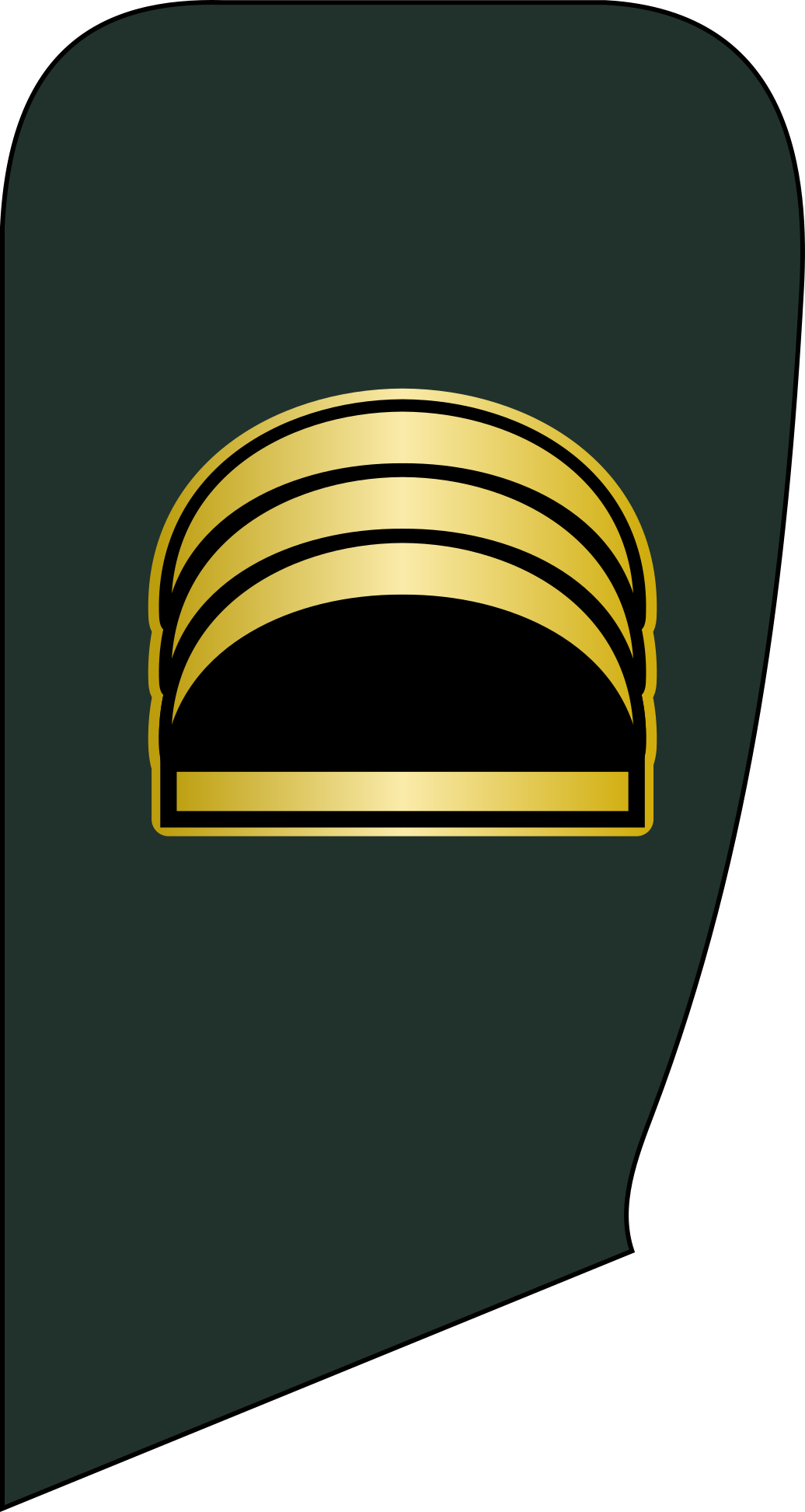
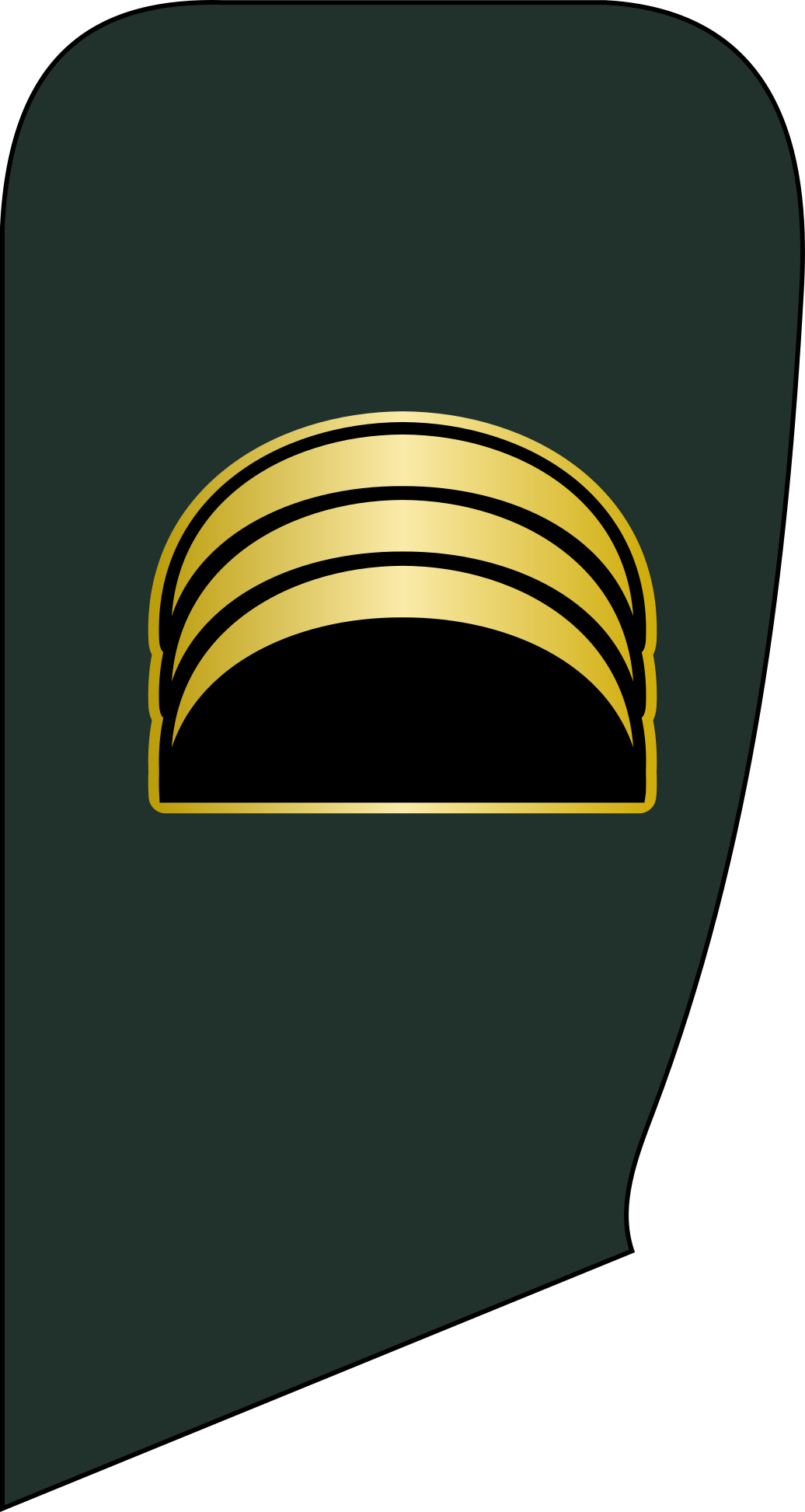
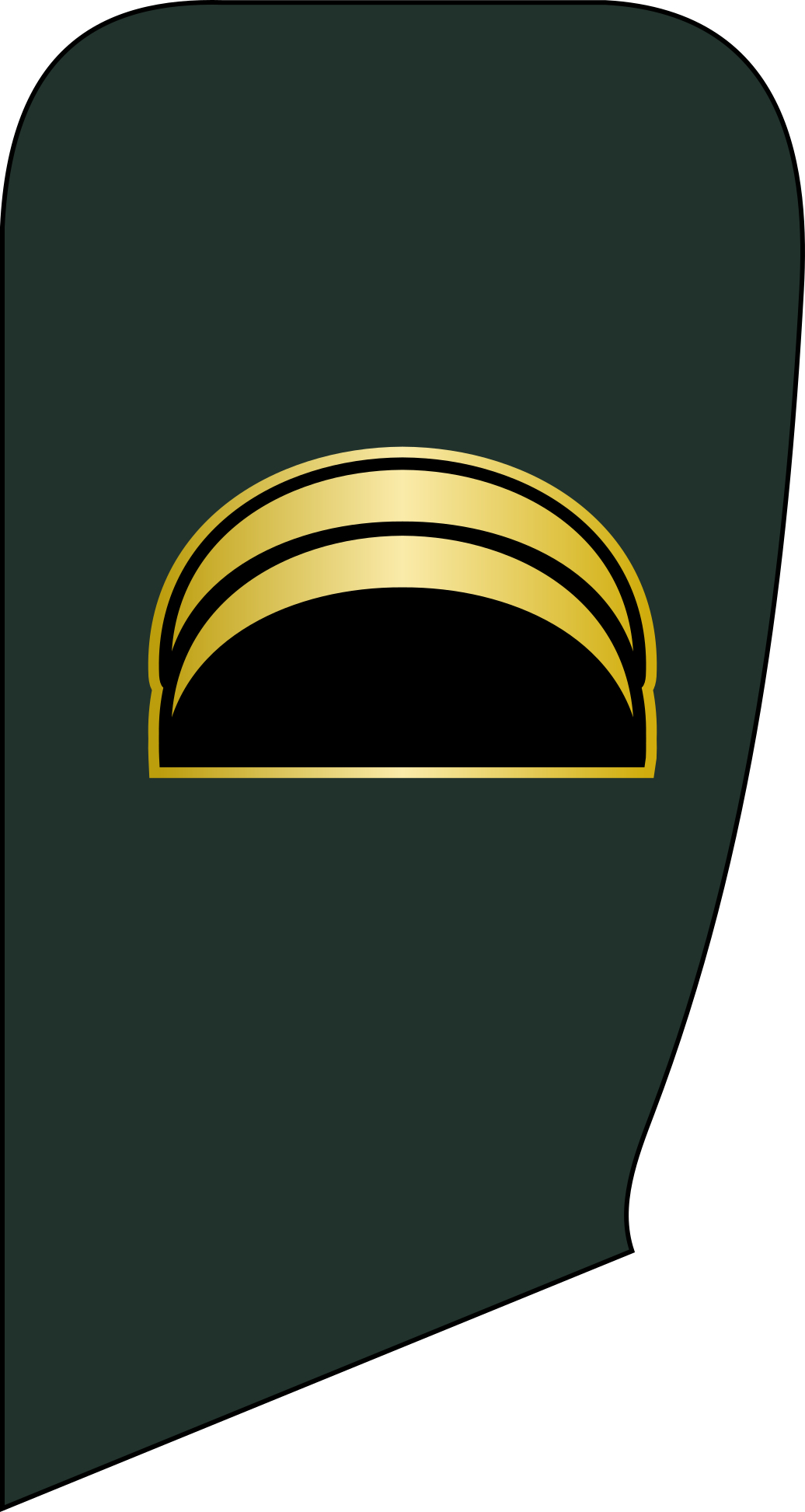
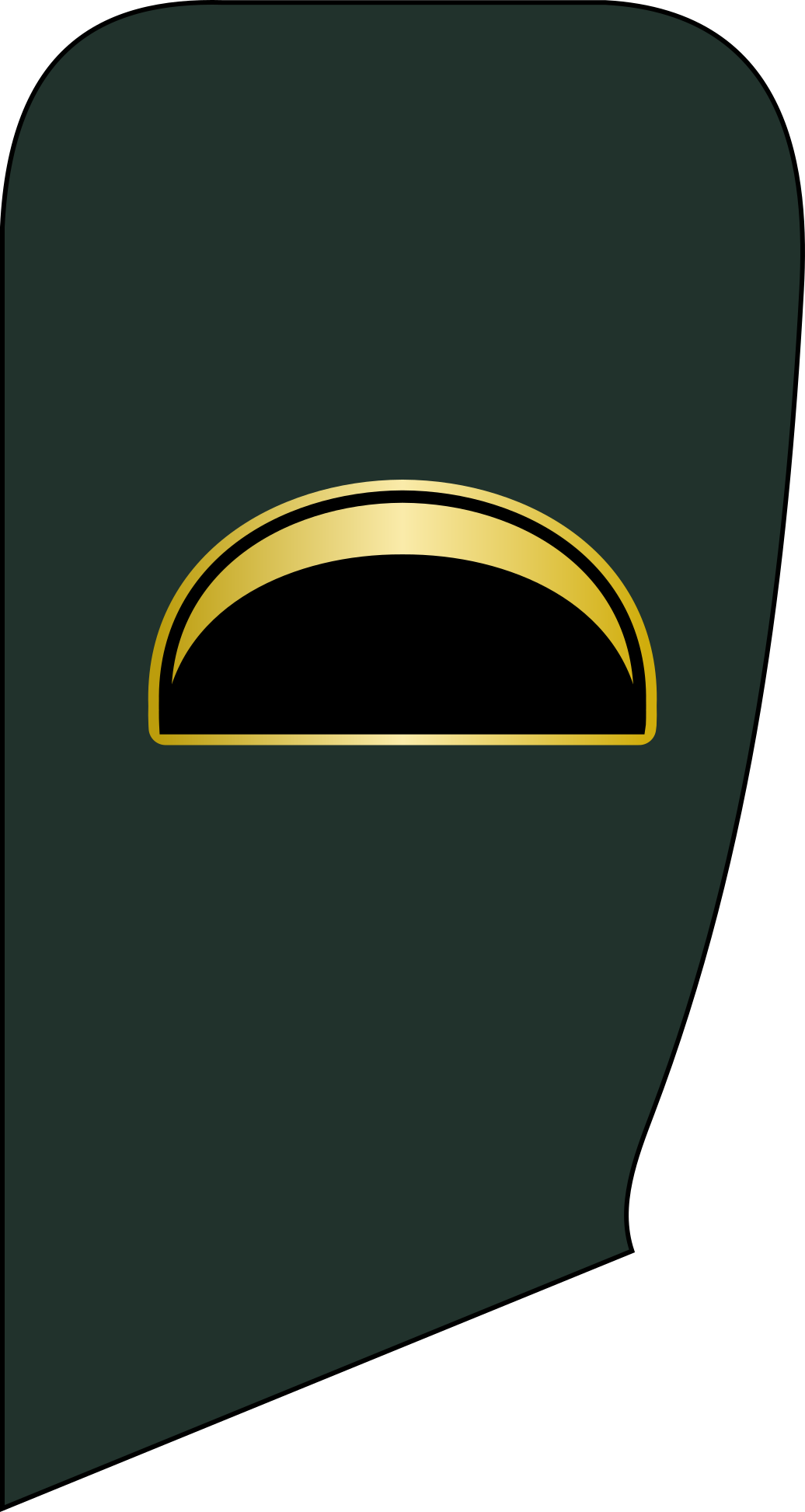
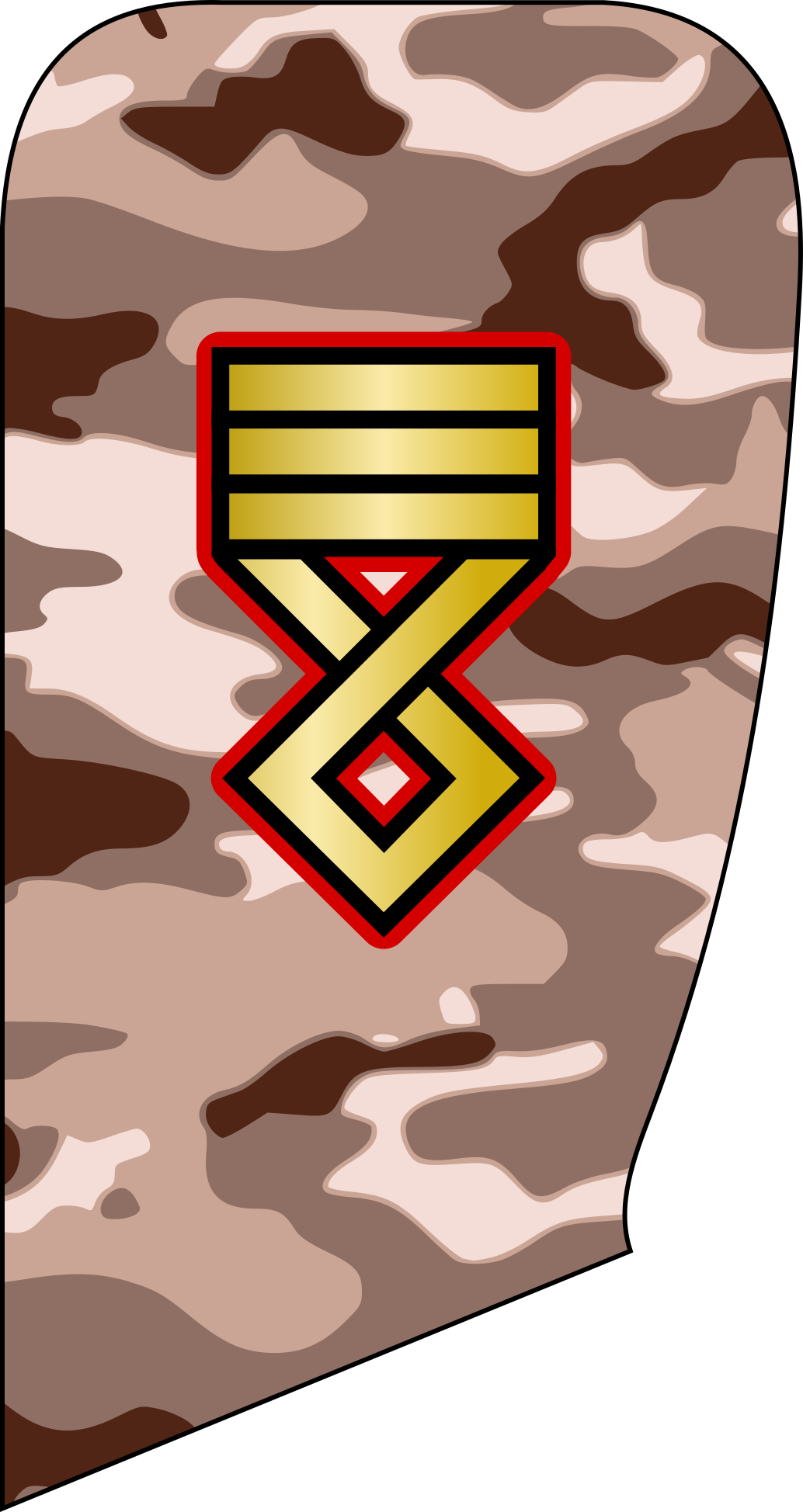
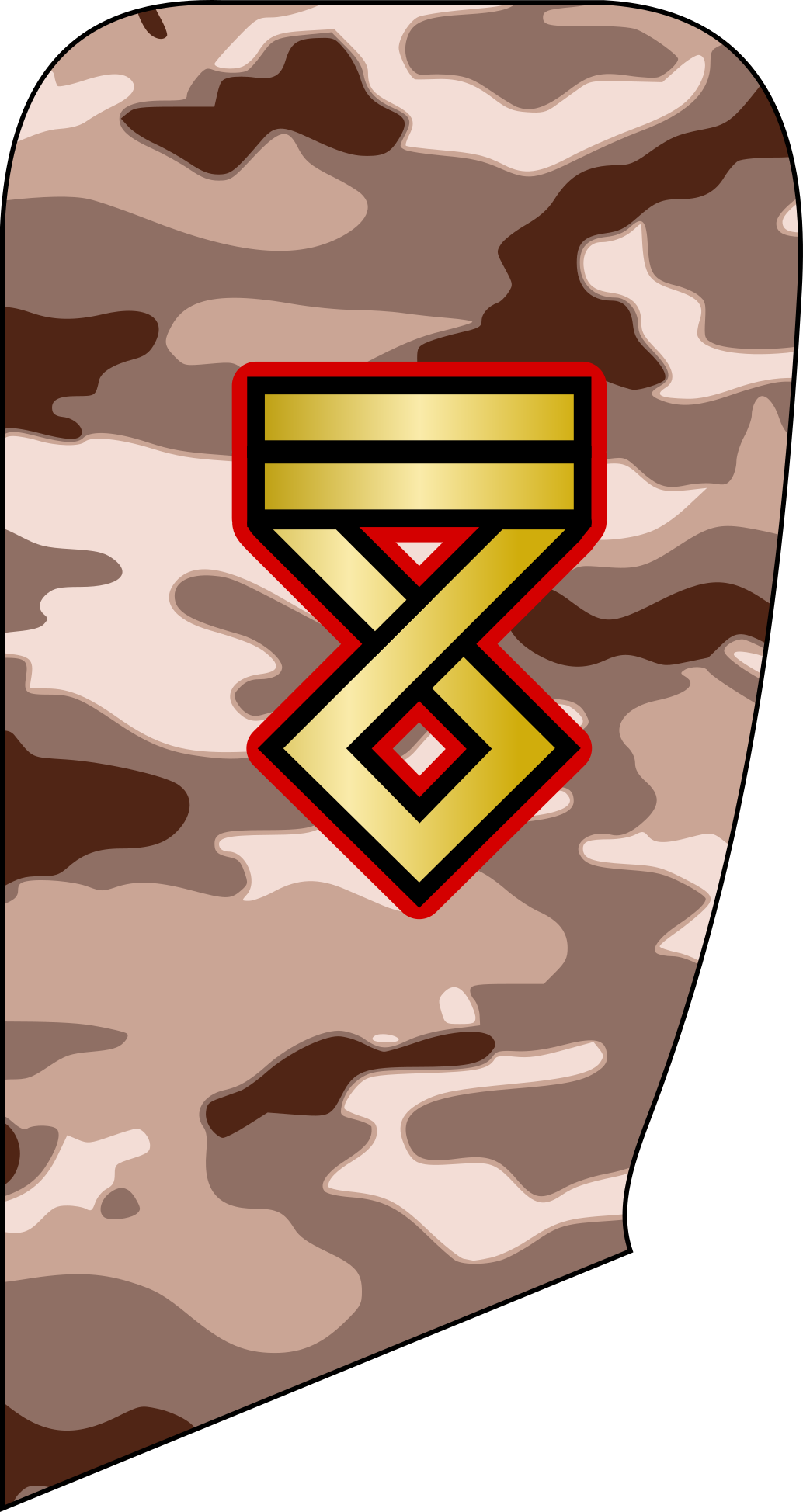
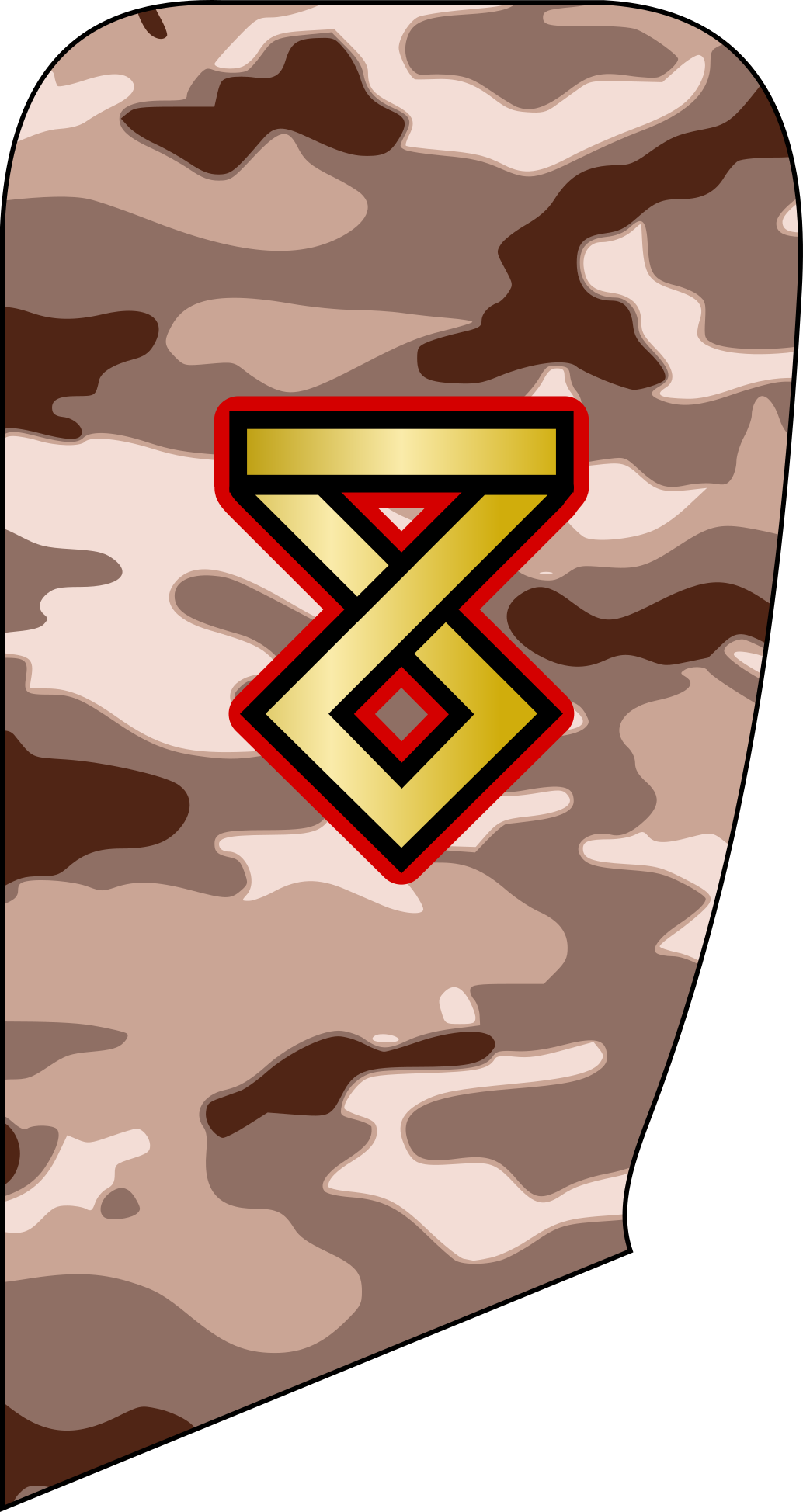
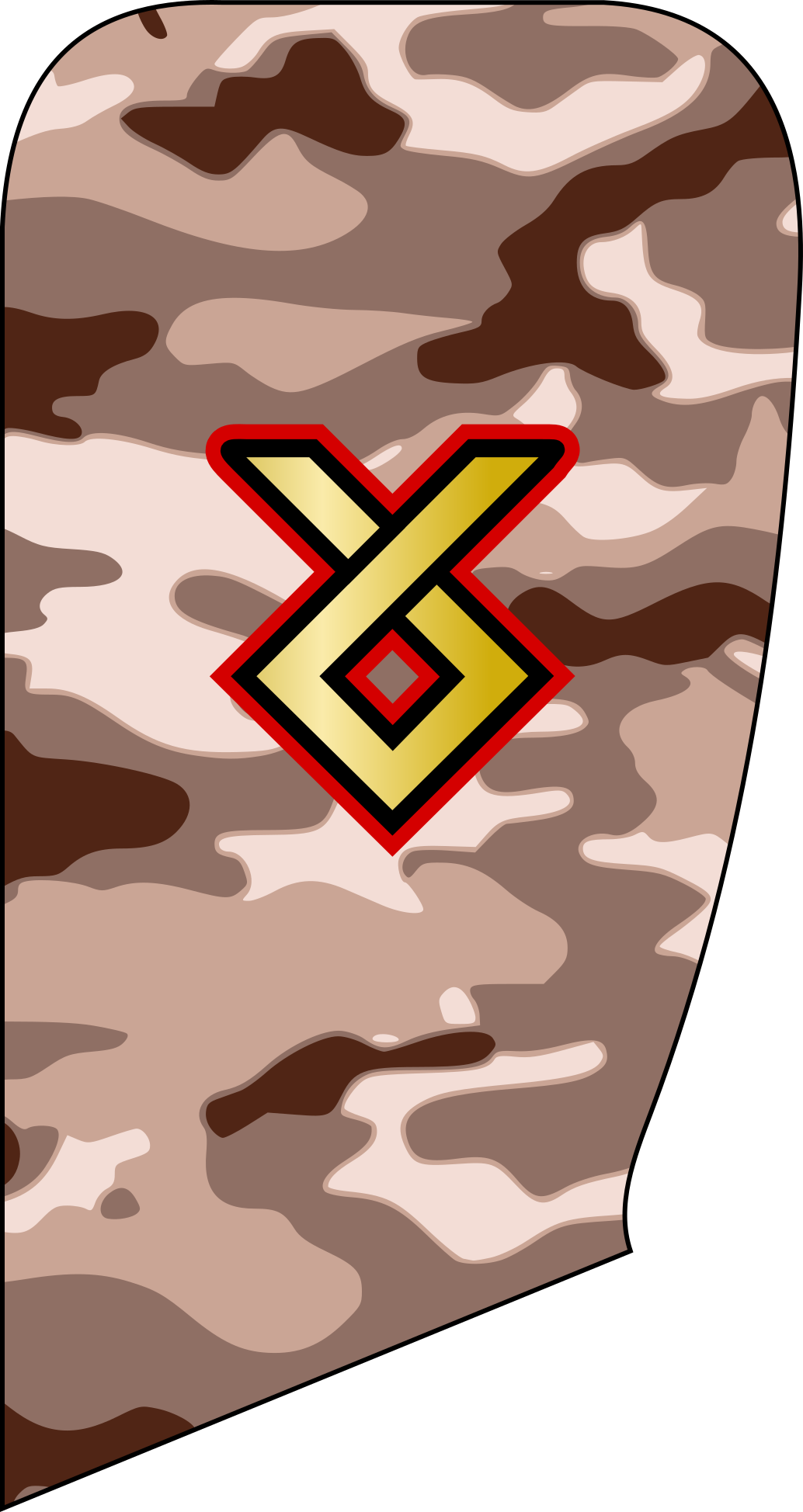
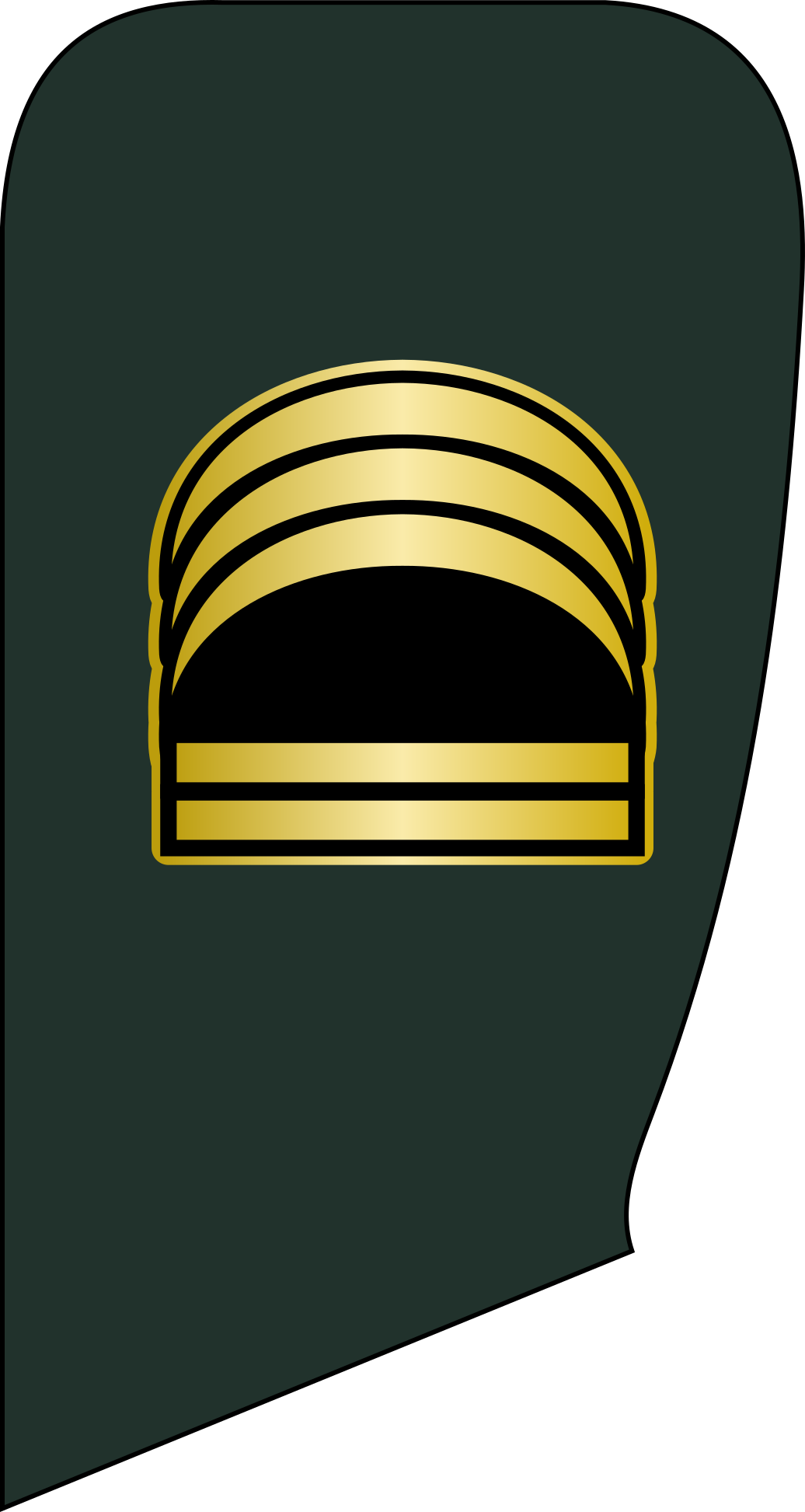
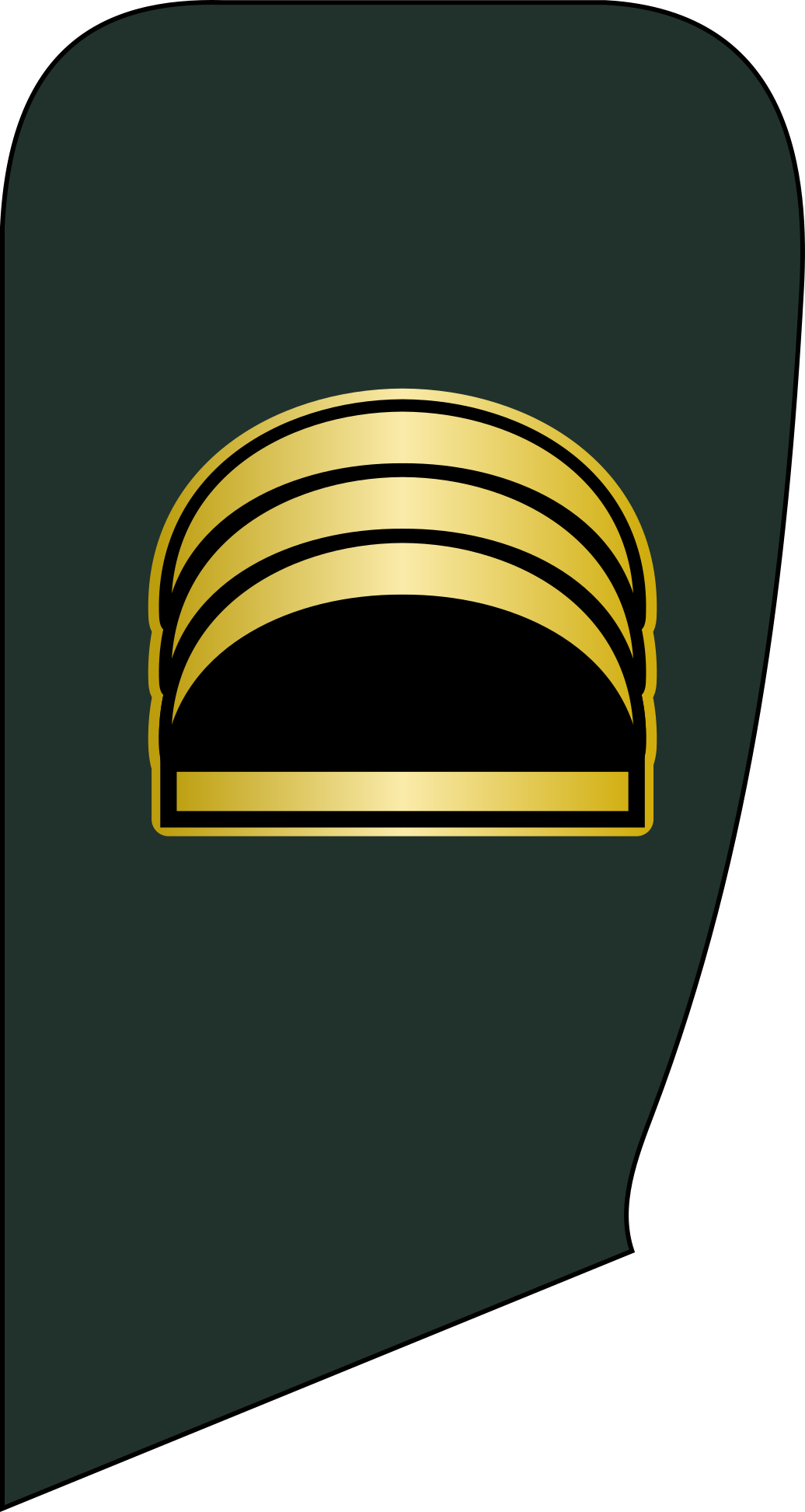
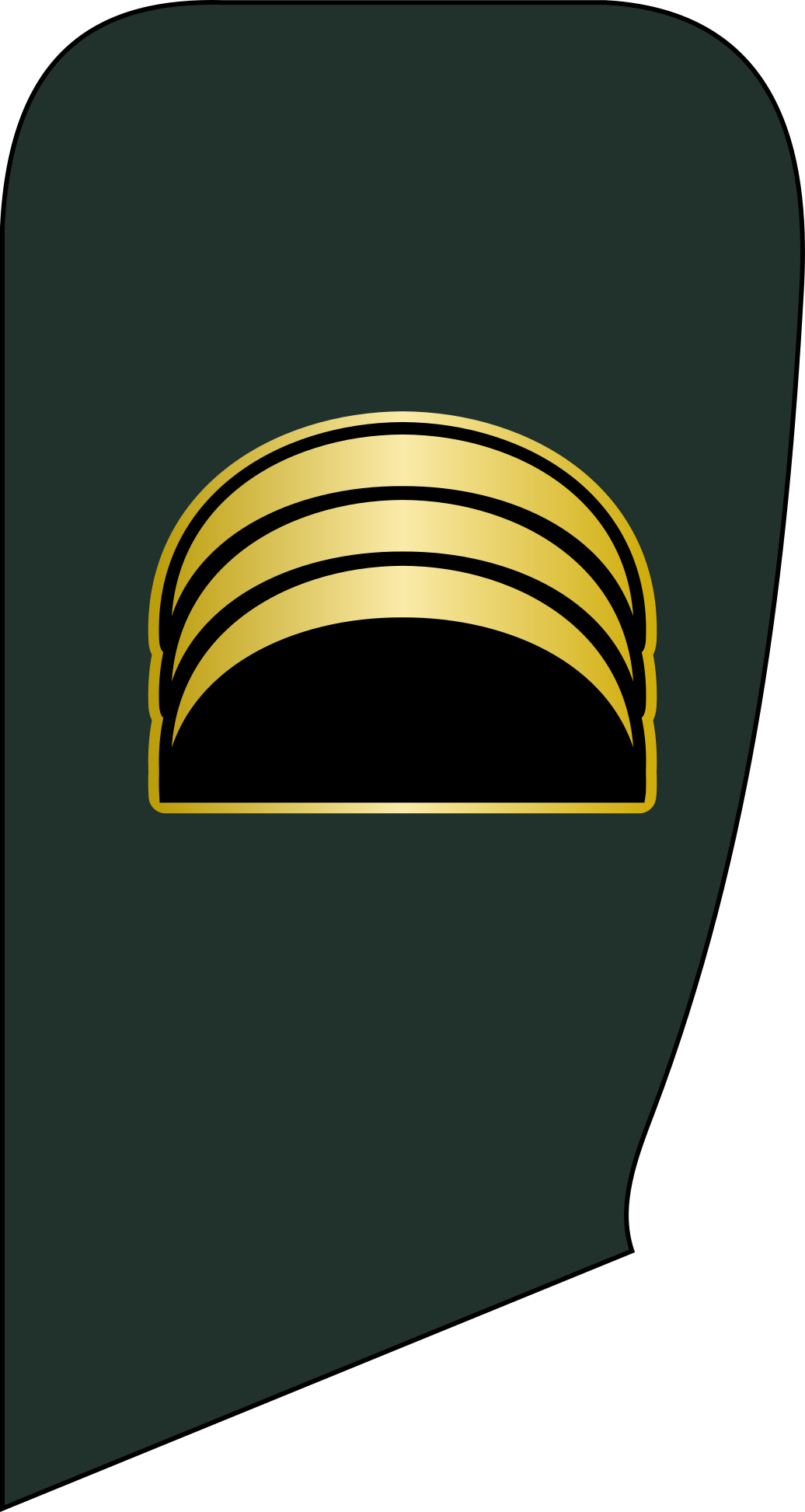
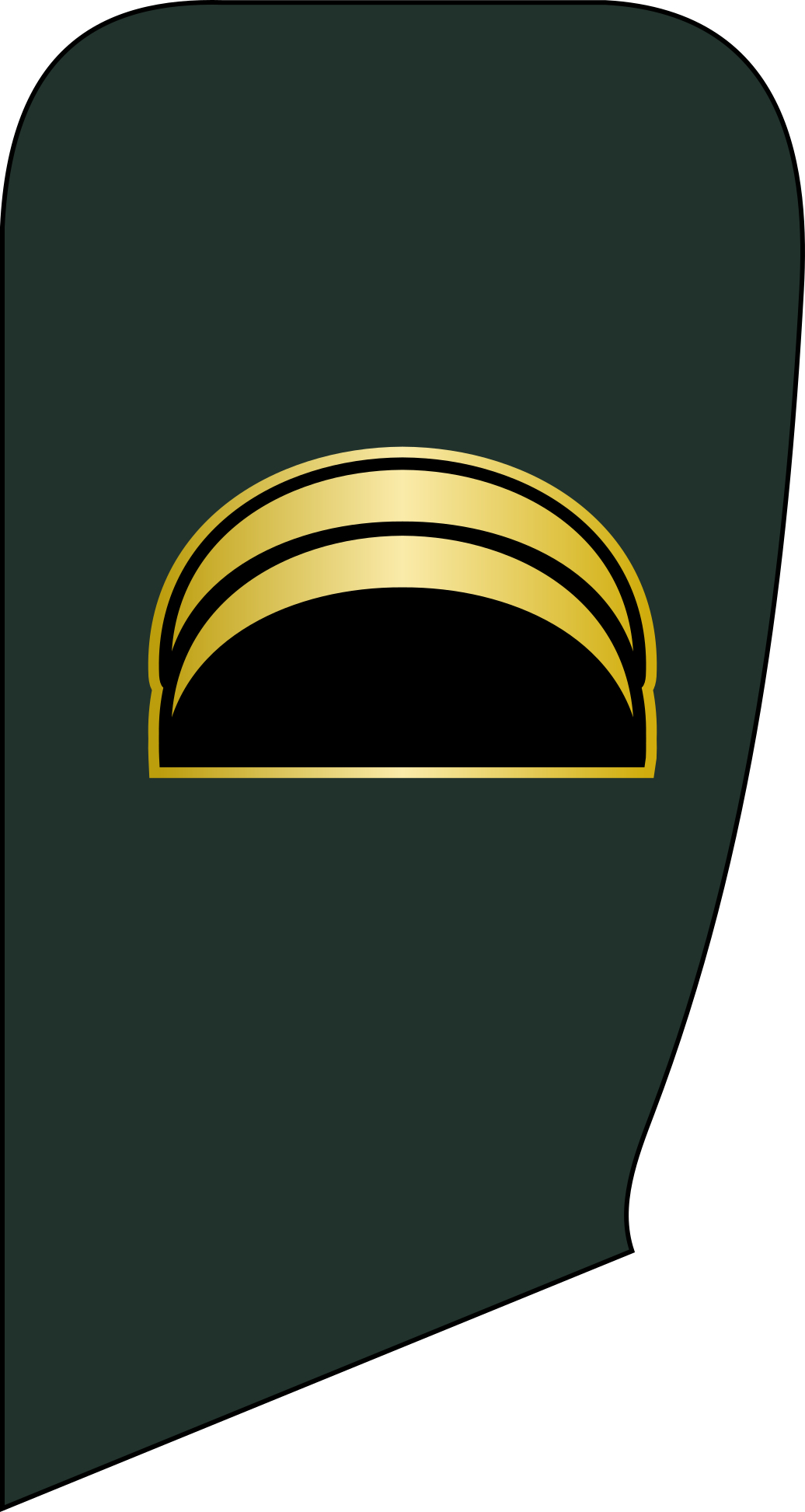
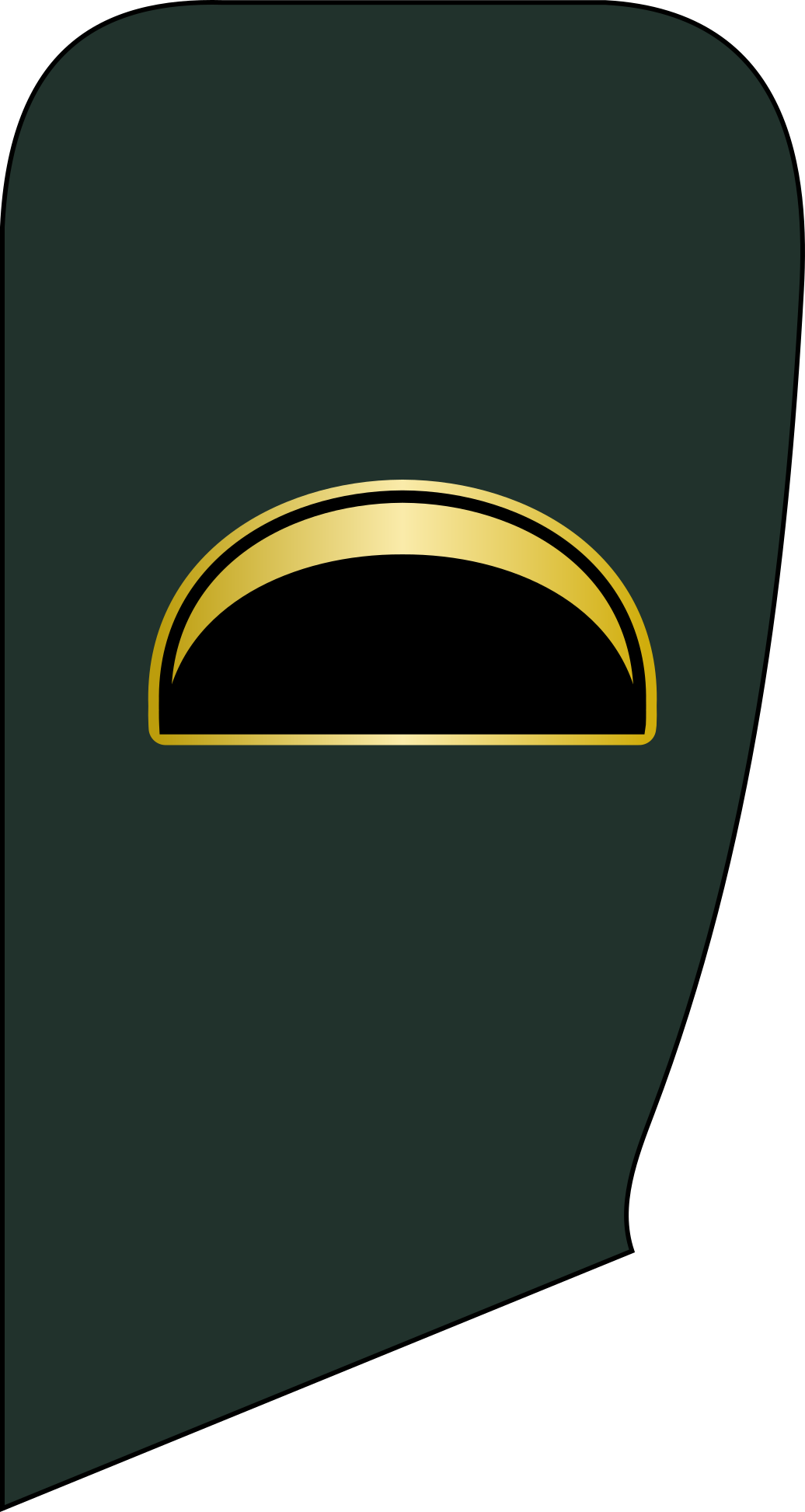
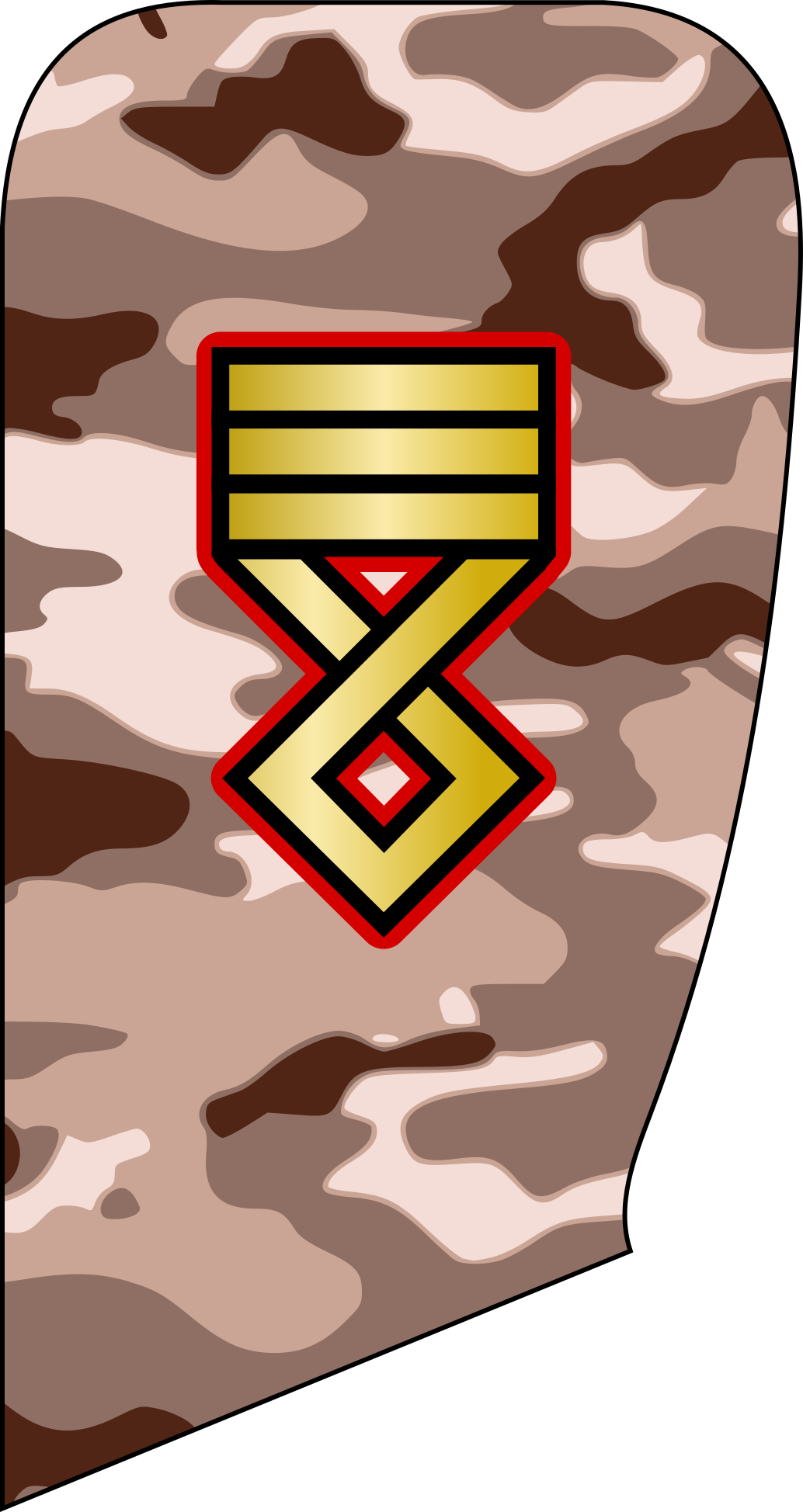
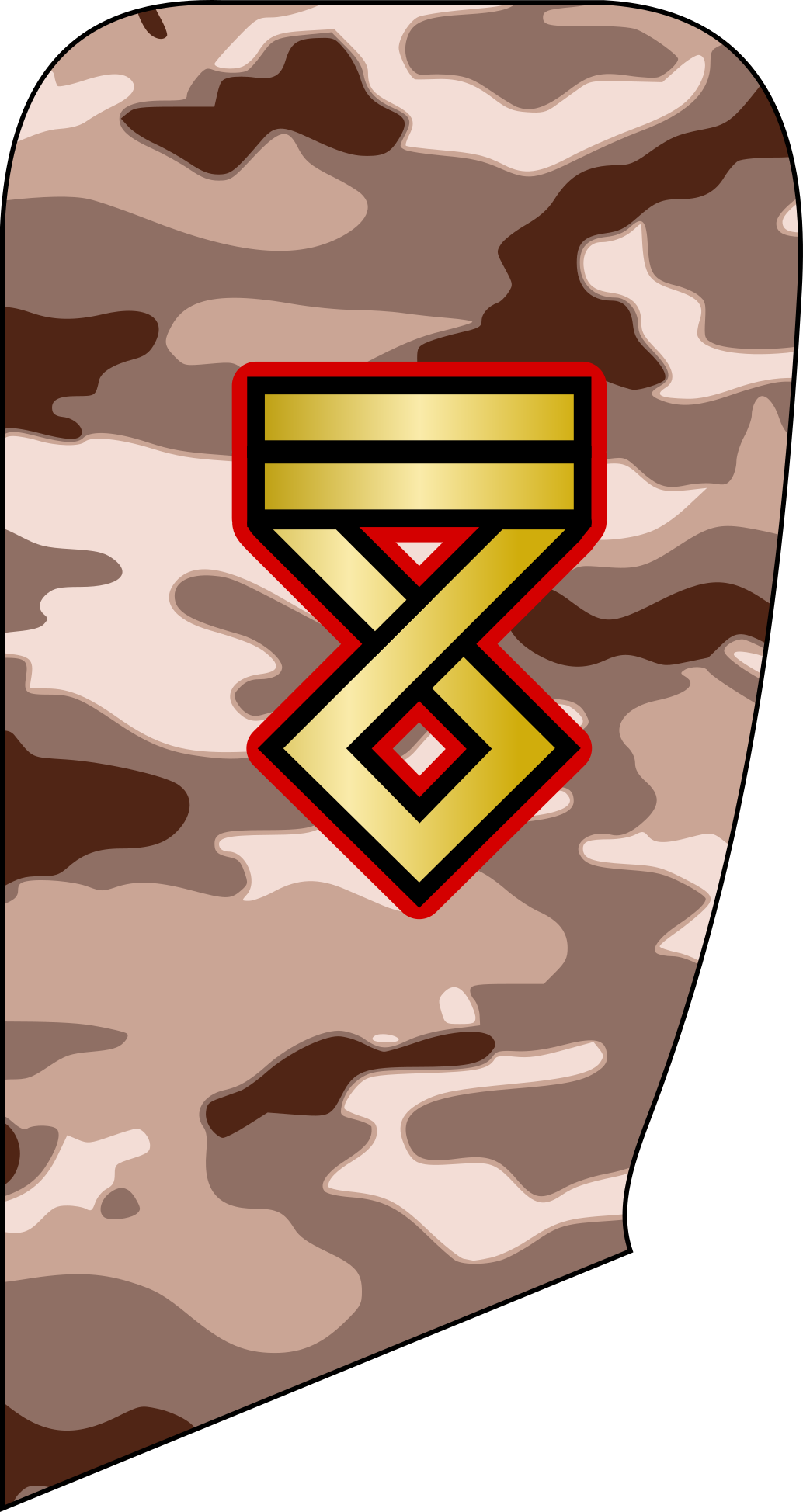
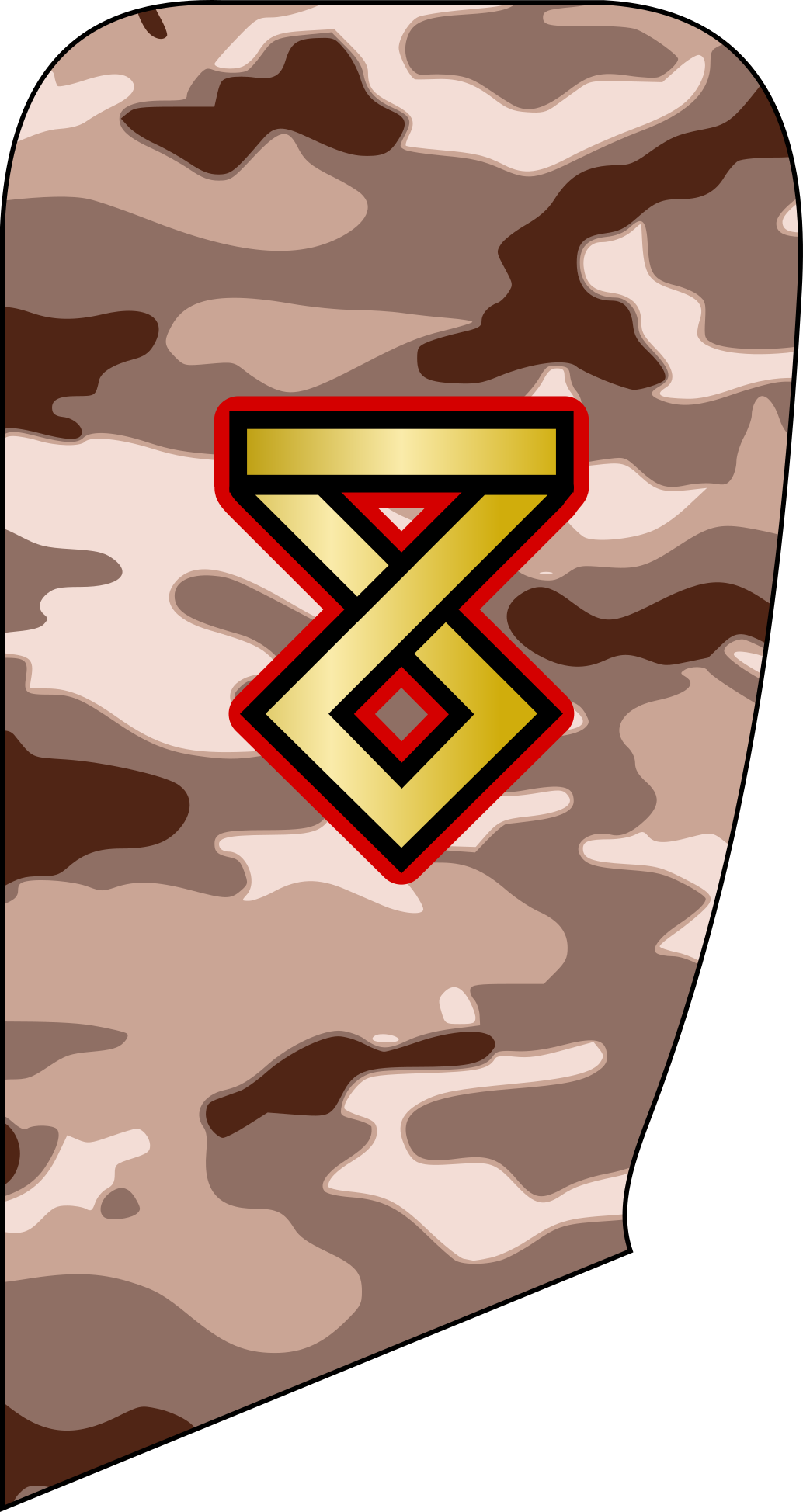
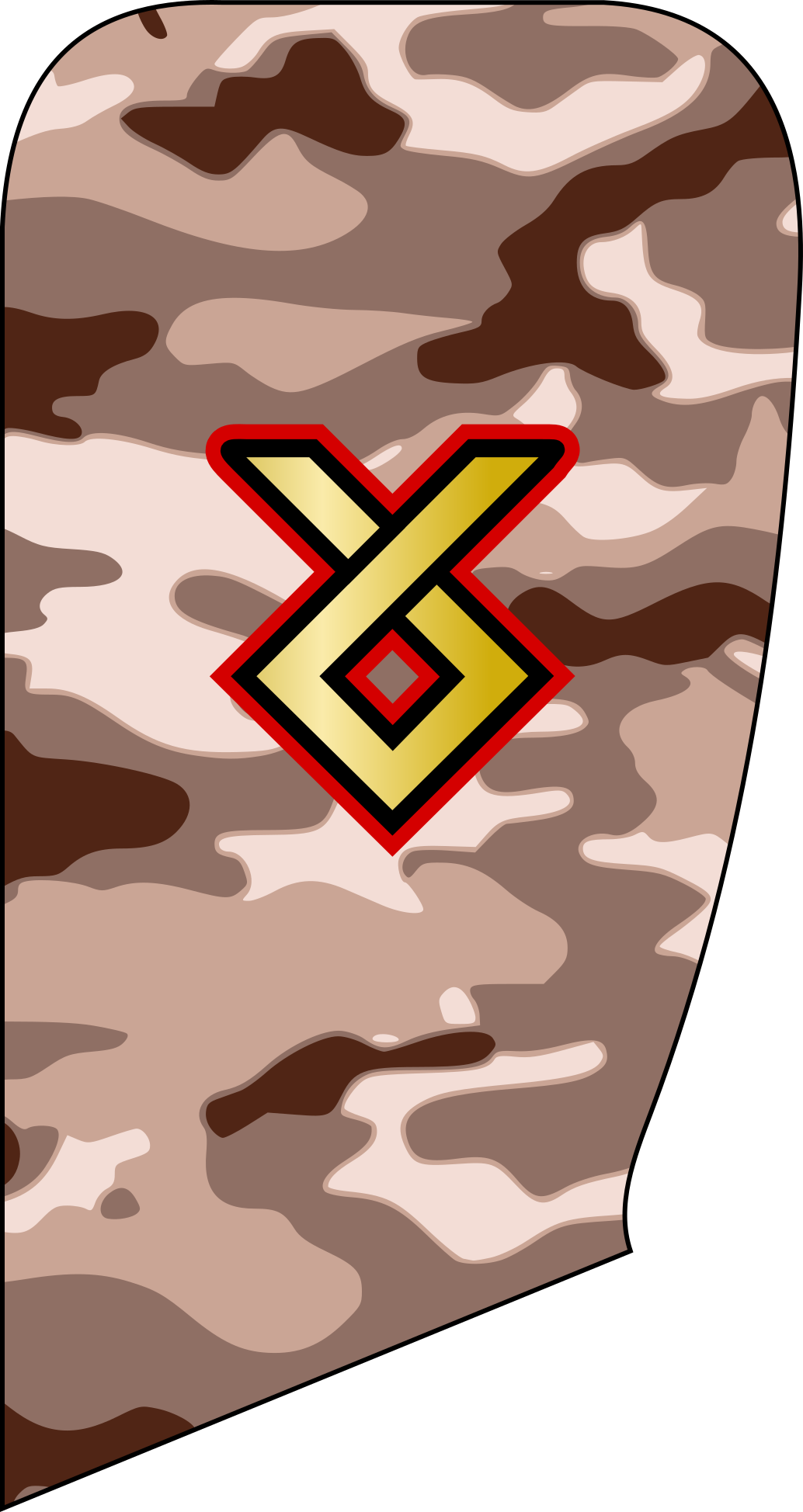
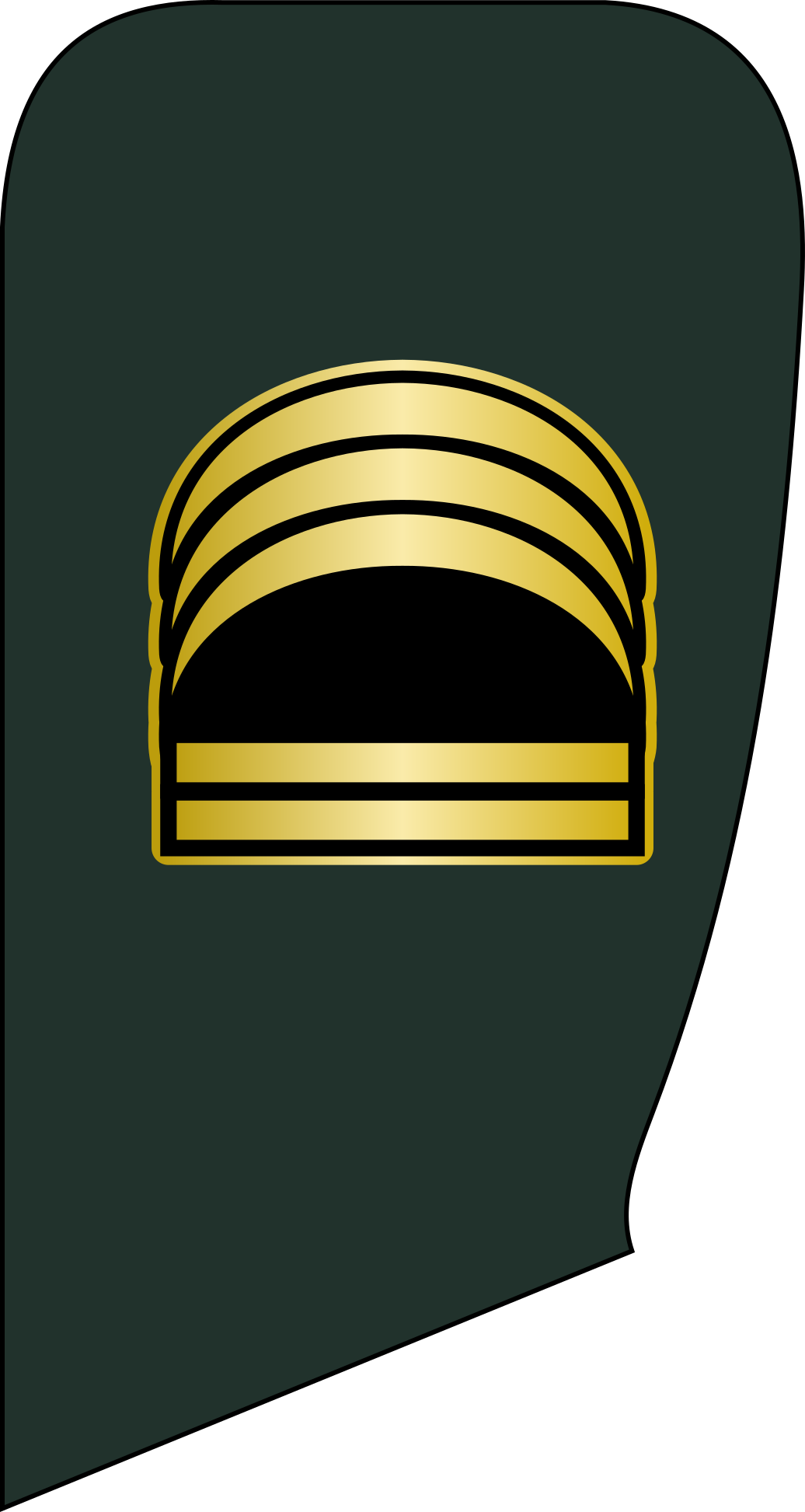
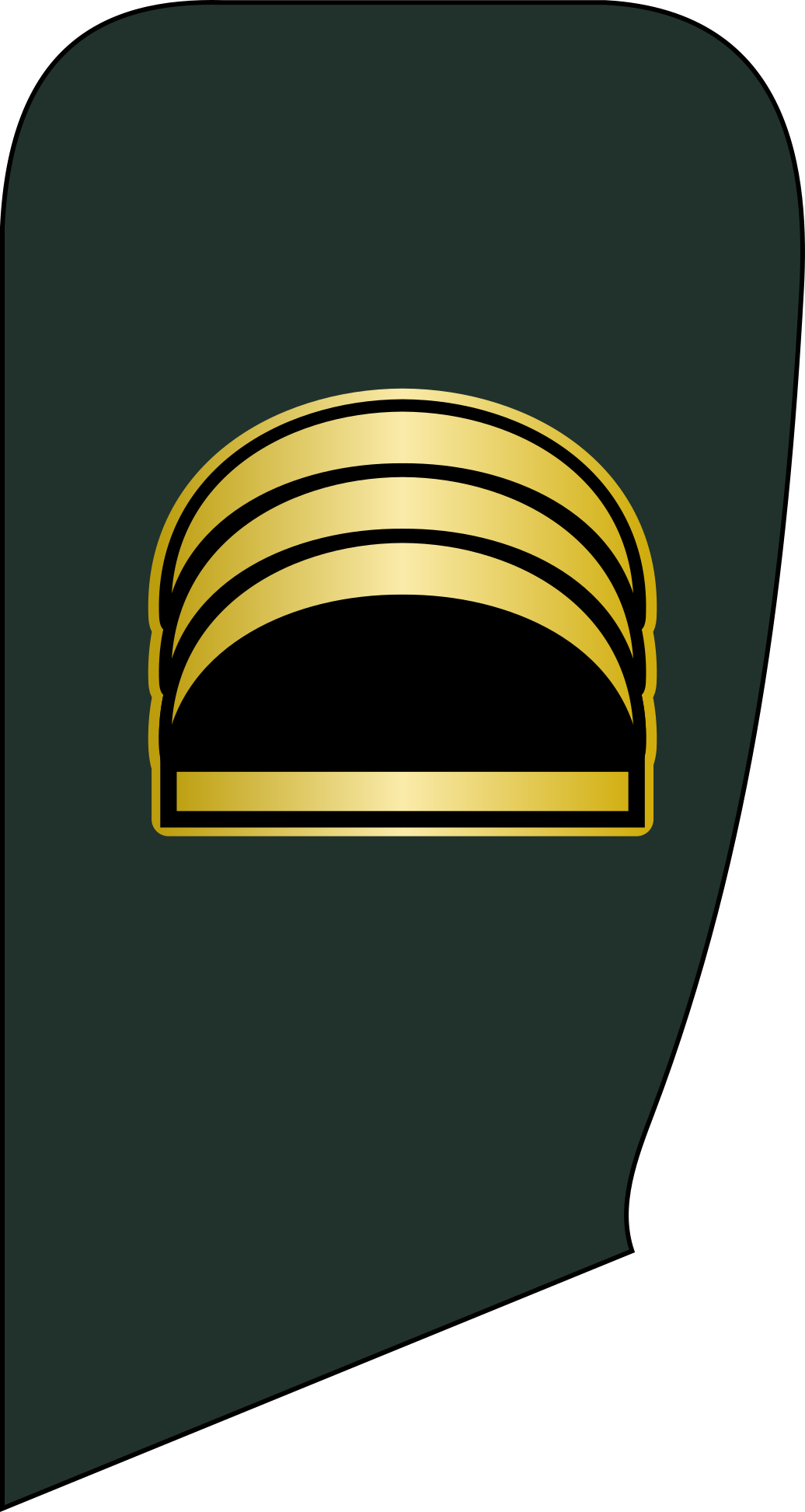
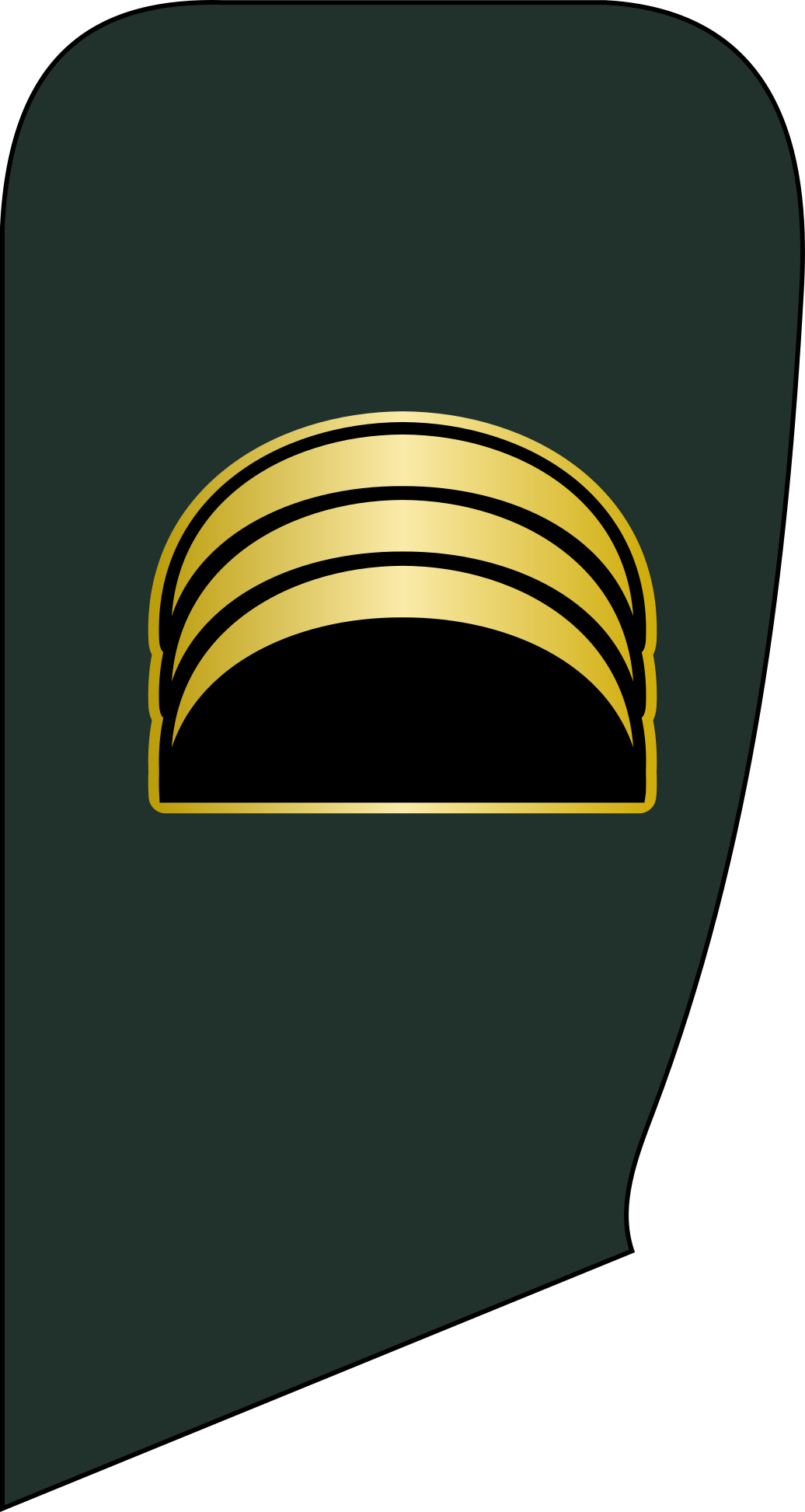
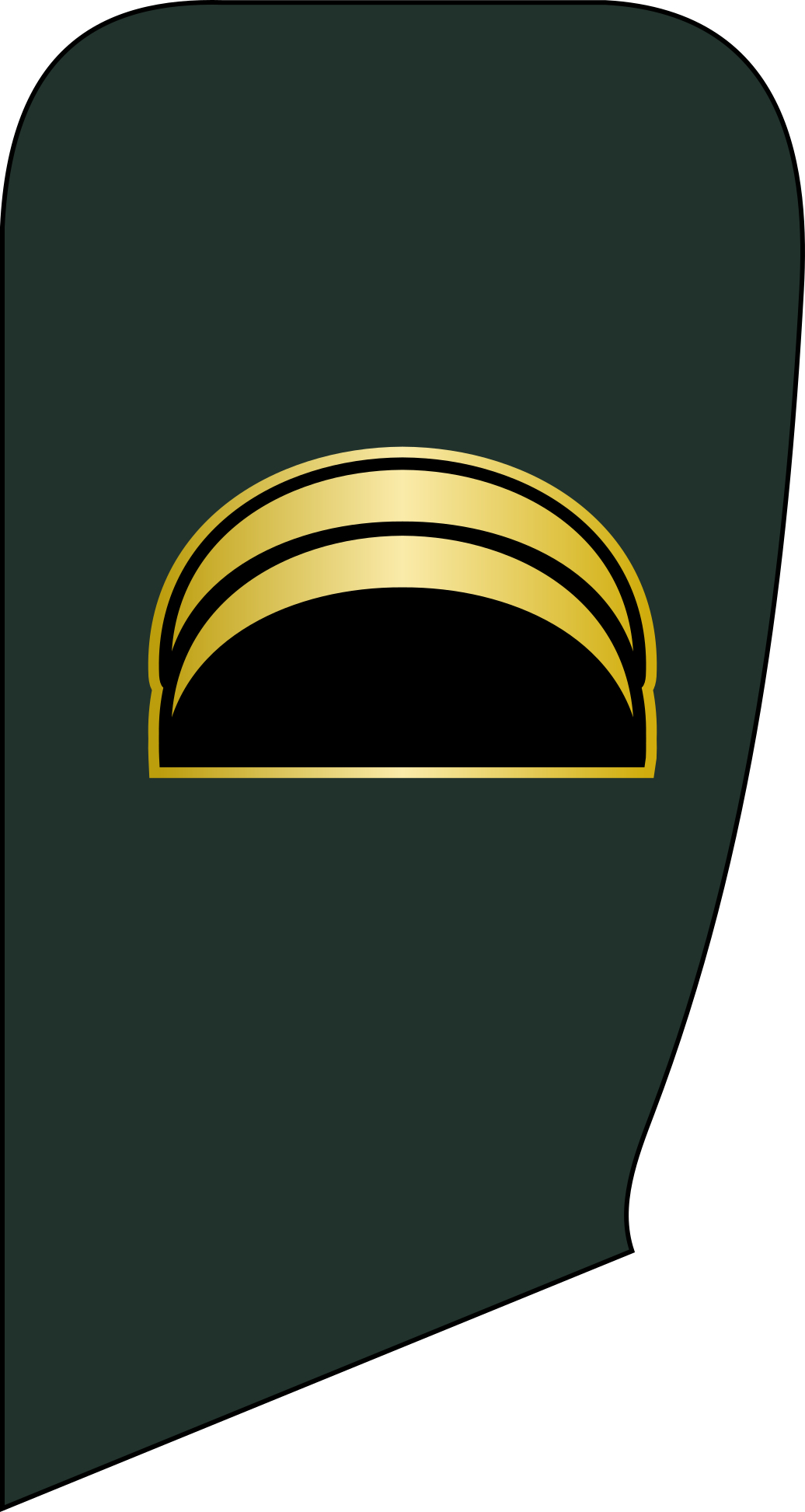
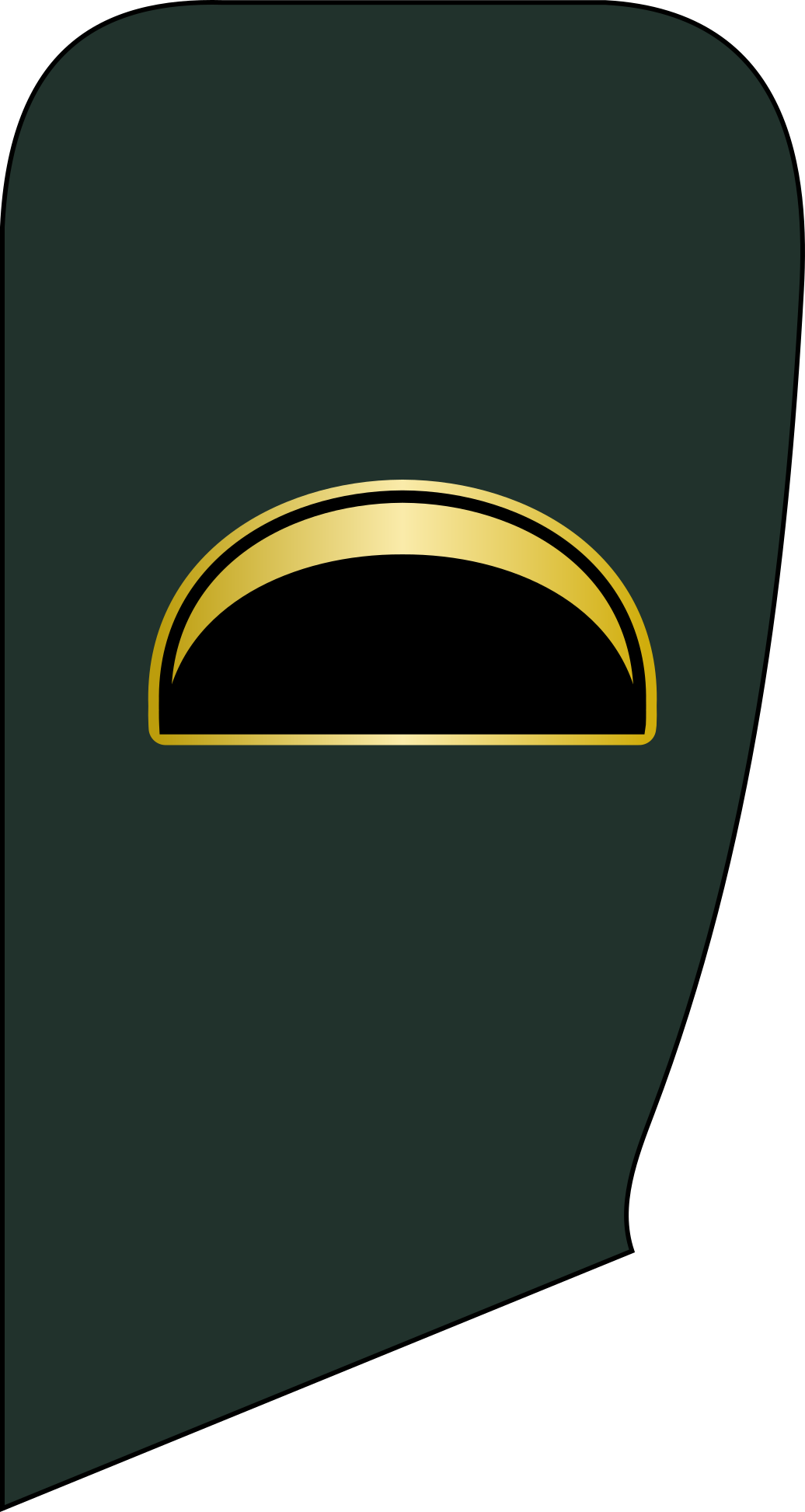
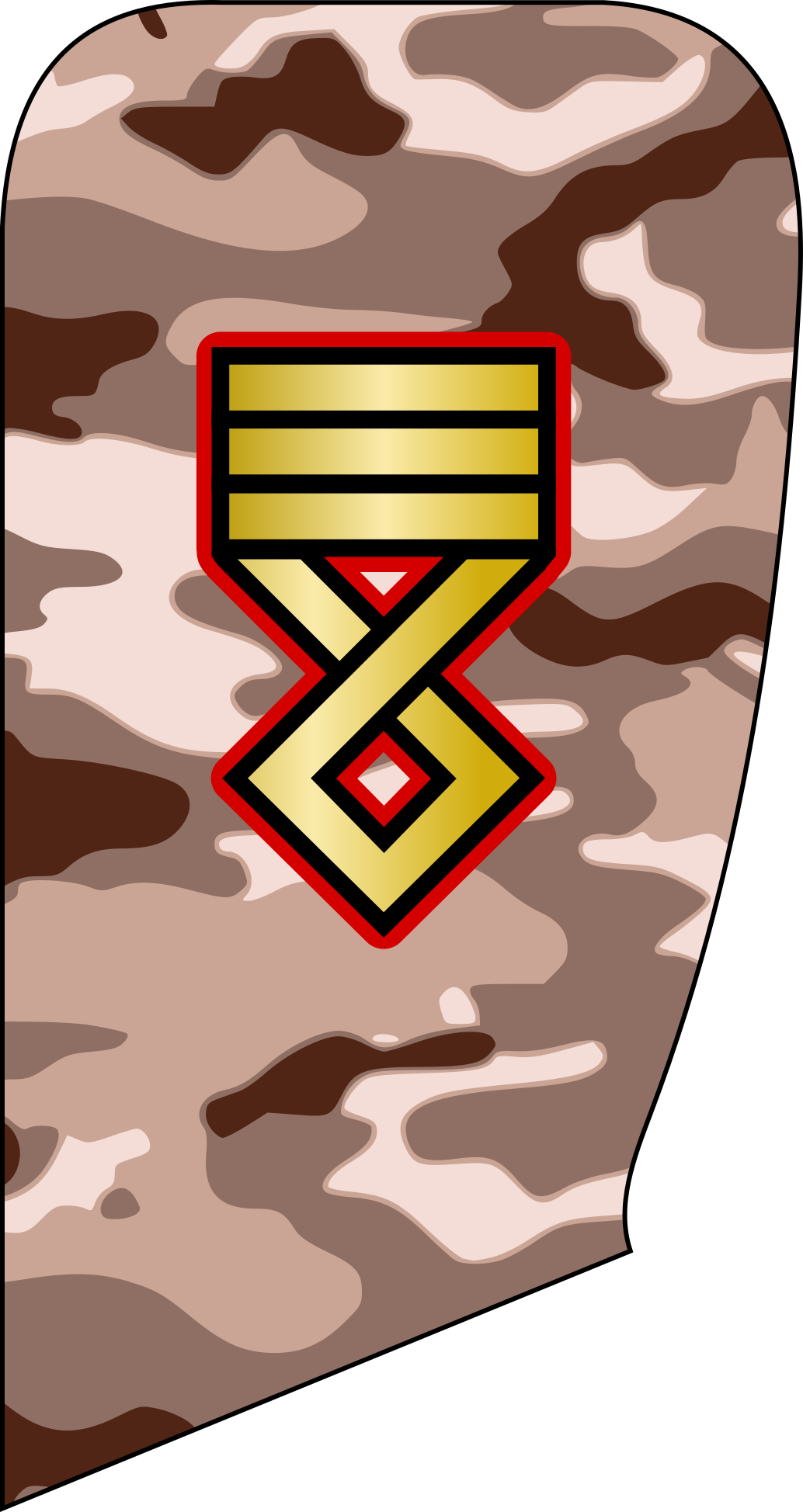
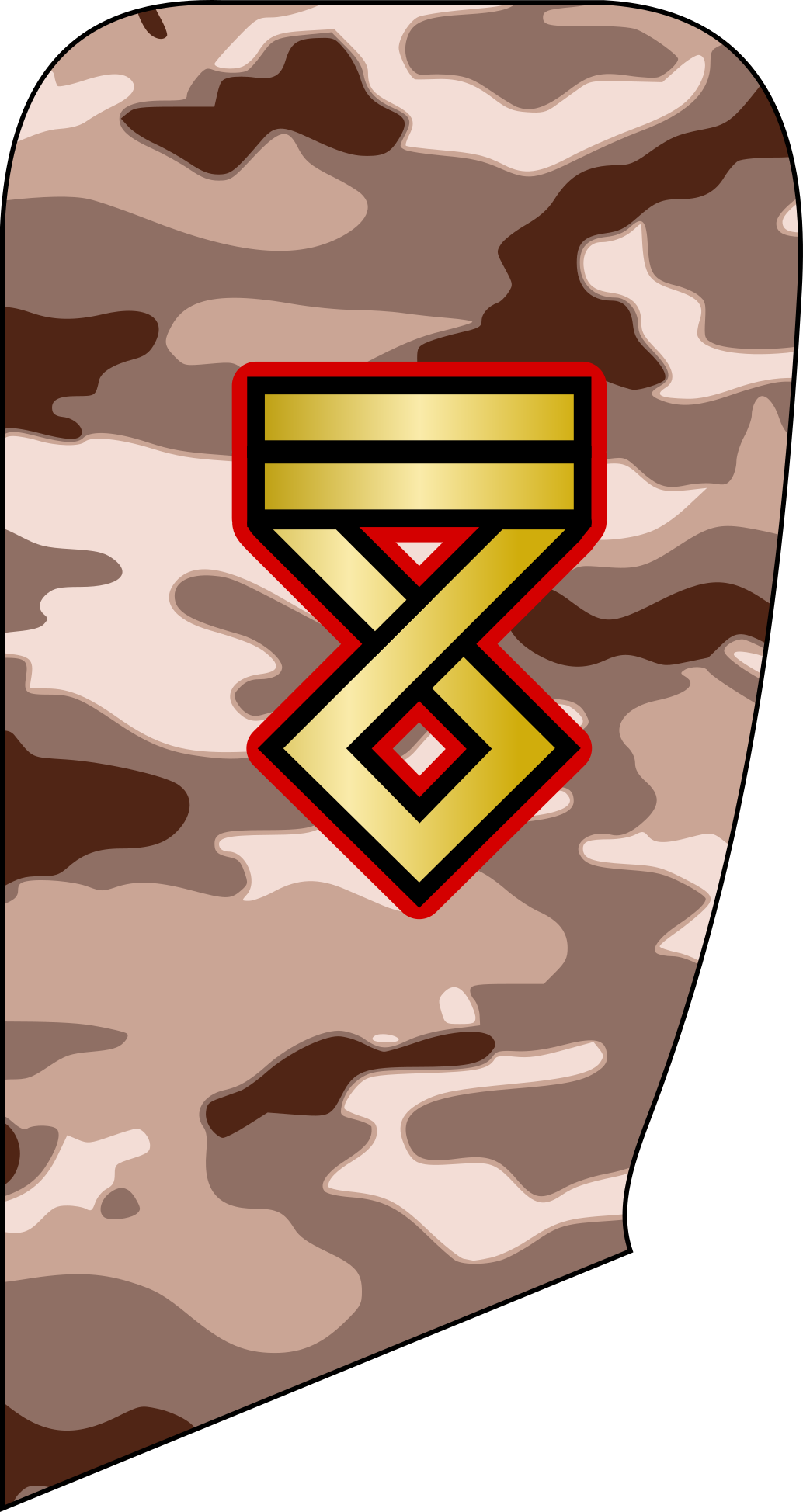
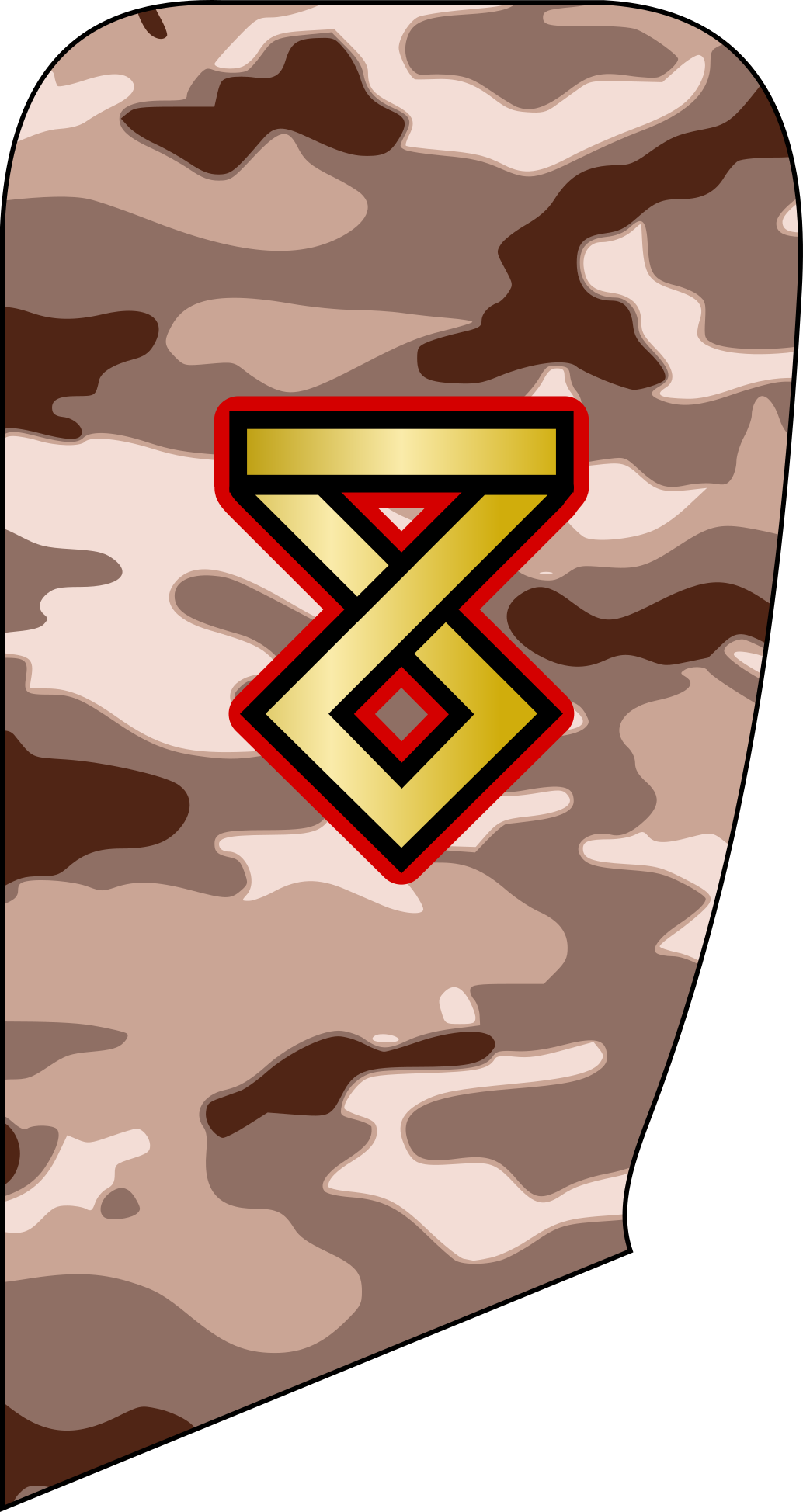
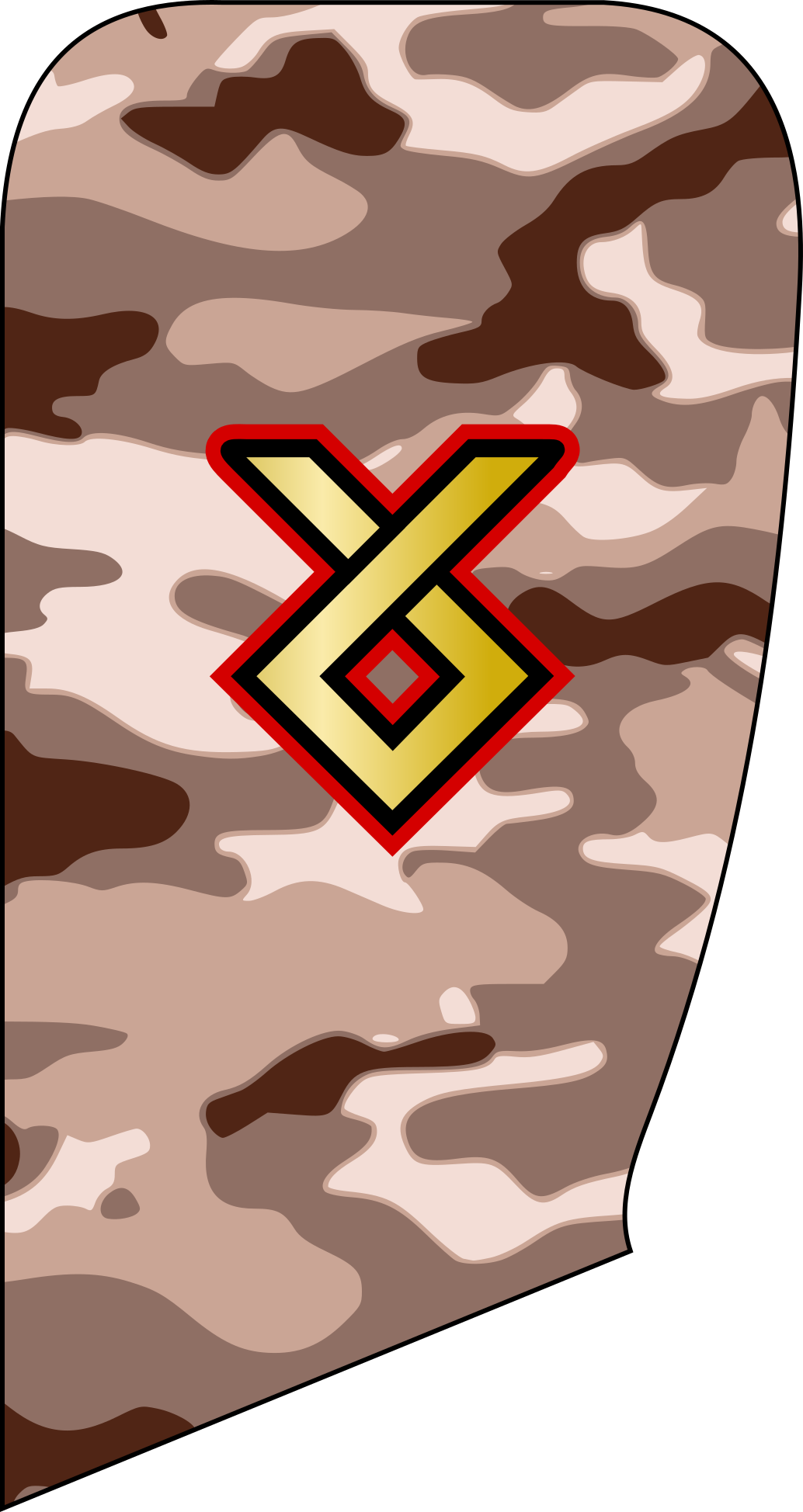
| Rank group | Senior NCOs | | | | | Junior NCOs | | Enlisted |
|---|---|---|---|---|---|---|---|---|---|
| IRGC Ground Forces |
| IRGC Ground Forces | رزم‌دار یکم; Razmdar yekom pasdar | رزم‌دار دوم; Razmdar dovom pasdar | رزم‌آور یکم; Razmavar yekom pasdar | رزم‌آور دوم; Razmavar dovom pasdar | رزم‌آور سوم; Razmavar sevom pasdar | رزم‌یار; Razmyar pasdar | سرباز یکم; Sarbaz yekom pasdar | سرباز دوم; Sarbaz dovom pasdar | سرباز; Sarbaz pasdar |
| IRGC Navy |
| IRGC Navy | ناودار یکم; Nawastwar yakam pasdar | ناودار دوم; Nawastwar dome pasdar | ناویار یکم; Mahnawi yakam pasdar | ناویار دوم; Mahnawi dome pasdar | ناویار سوم; Mahnawi some pasdar | سرناوی; Sernaoui pasdar | ناوی یکم; Nawi yakam pasdar | ناوی دوم; Nawi dome pasdar | ناوی; Nawi pasdar |
| IRGC Aerospace Force |
| IRGC Aerospace Force | رزم‌دار یکم; Razmdar yekom pasdar | رزم‌دار دوم; Razmdar dovom pasdar | رزم‌آور یکم; Razmavar yekom pasdar | رزم‌آور دوم; Razmavar dovom pasdar | رزم‌آور سوم; Razmavar sevom pasdar | رزم‌یار; Razmyar pasdar | سرباز یکم; Sarbaz yekom pasdar | سرباز دوم; Sarbaz dovom pasdar | سرباز; Sarbaz pasdar |
| Rank group | Senior NCOs | | | | | Junior NCOs | | Enlisted |

=== Law Enforcement command ===
==== Commissioned officer ranks ====
The rank insignia of commissioned officers.

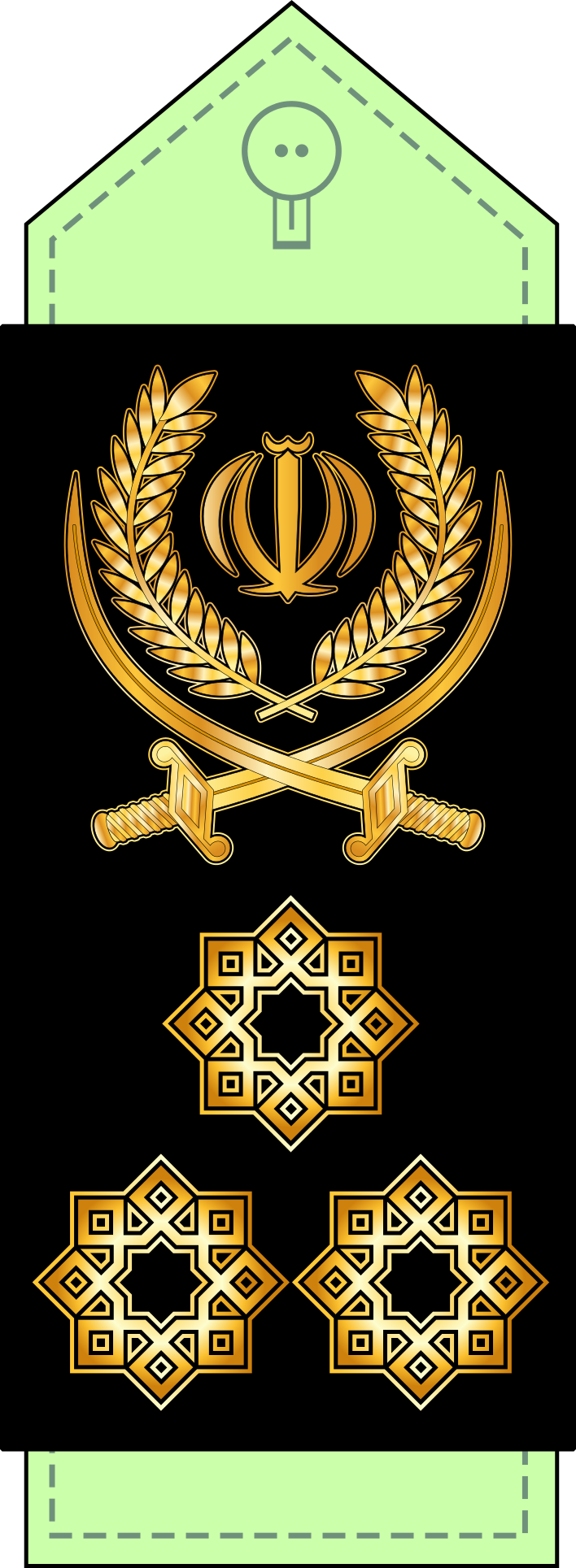
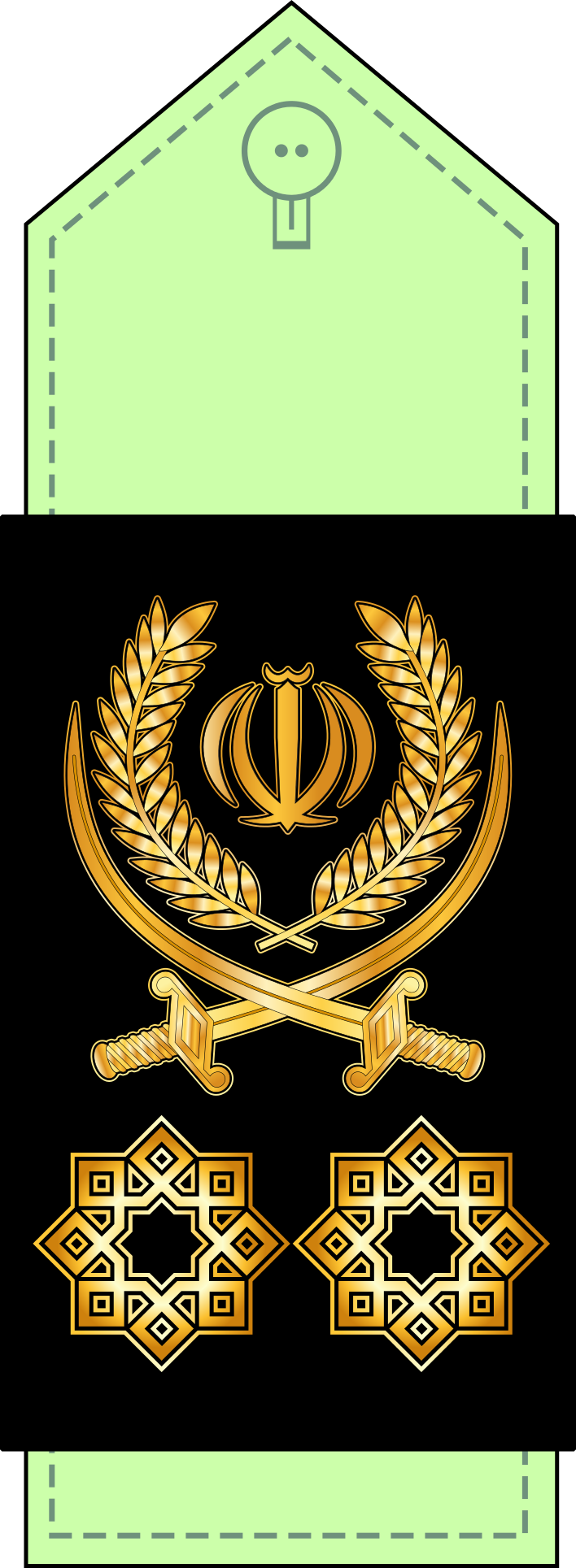
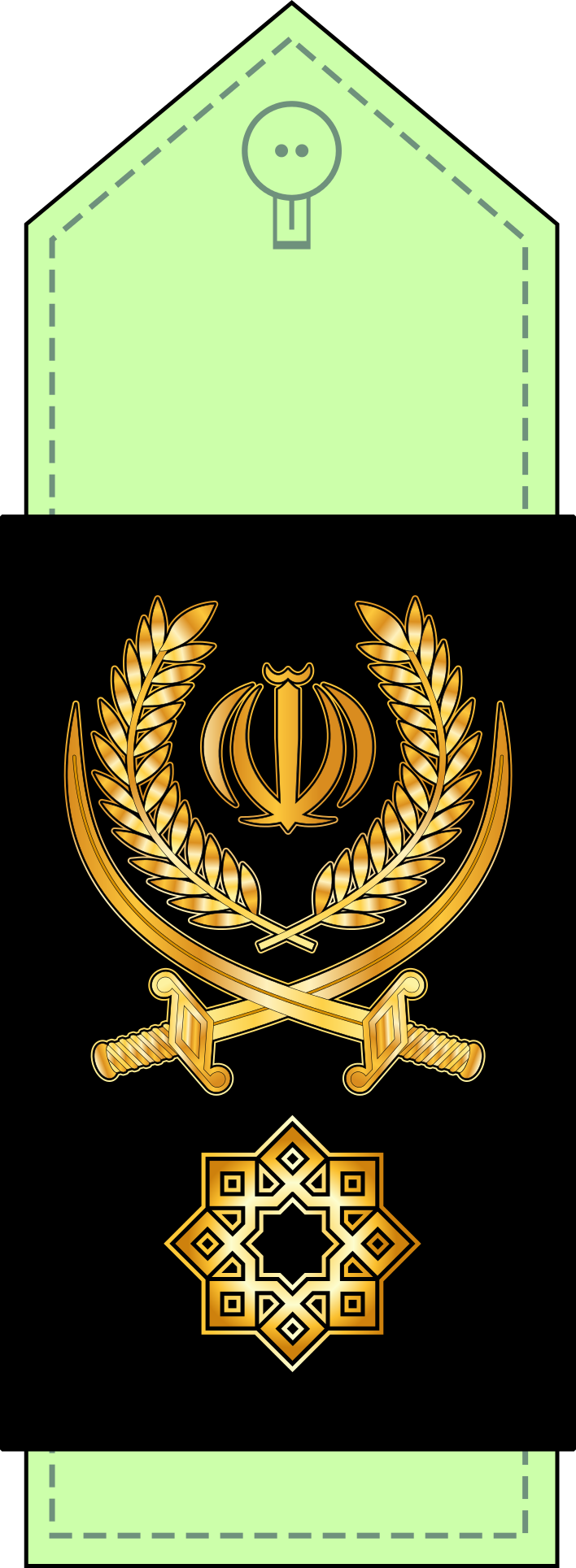
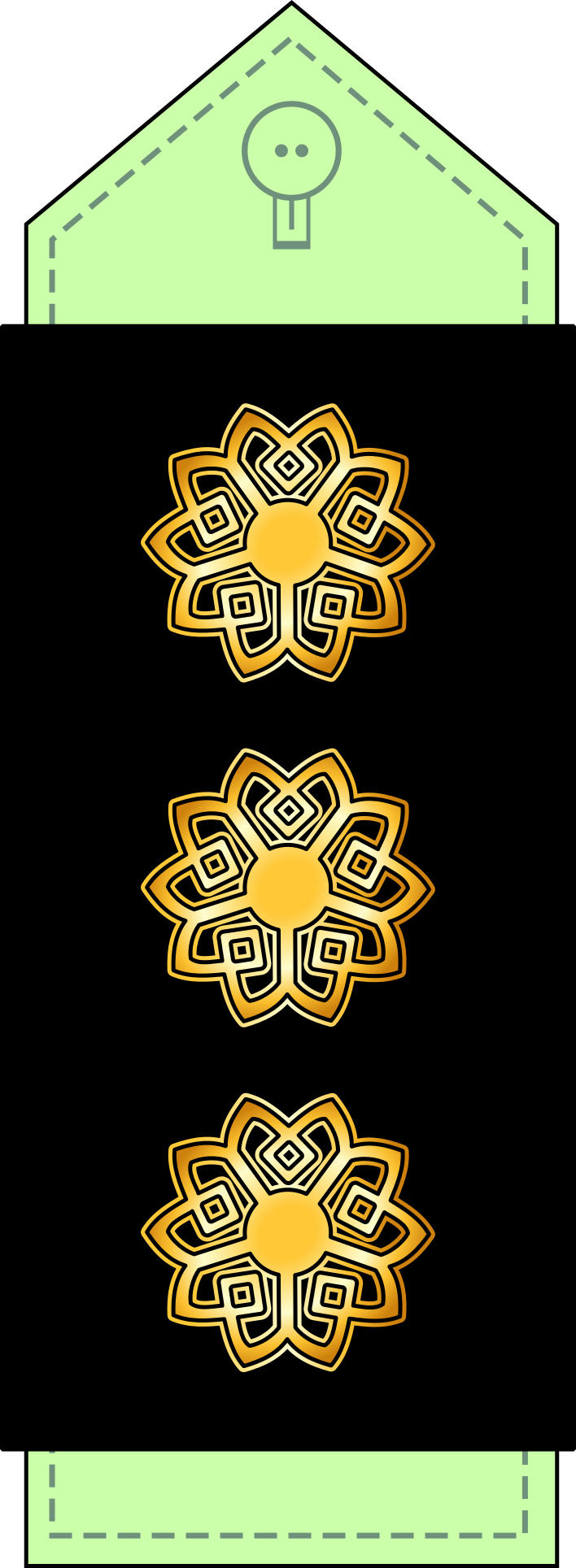
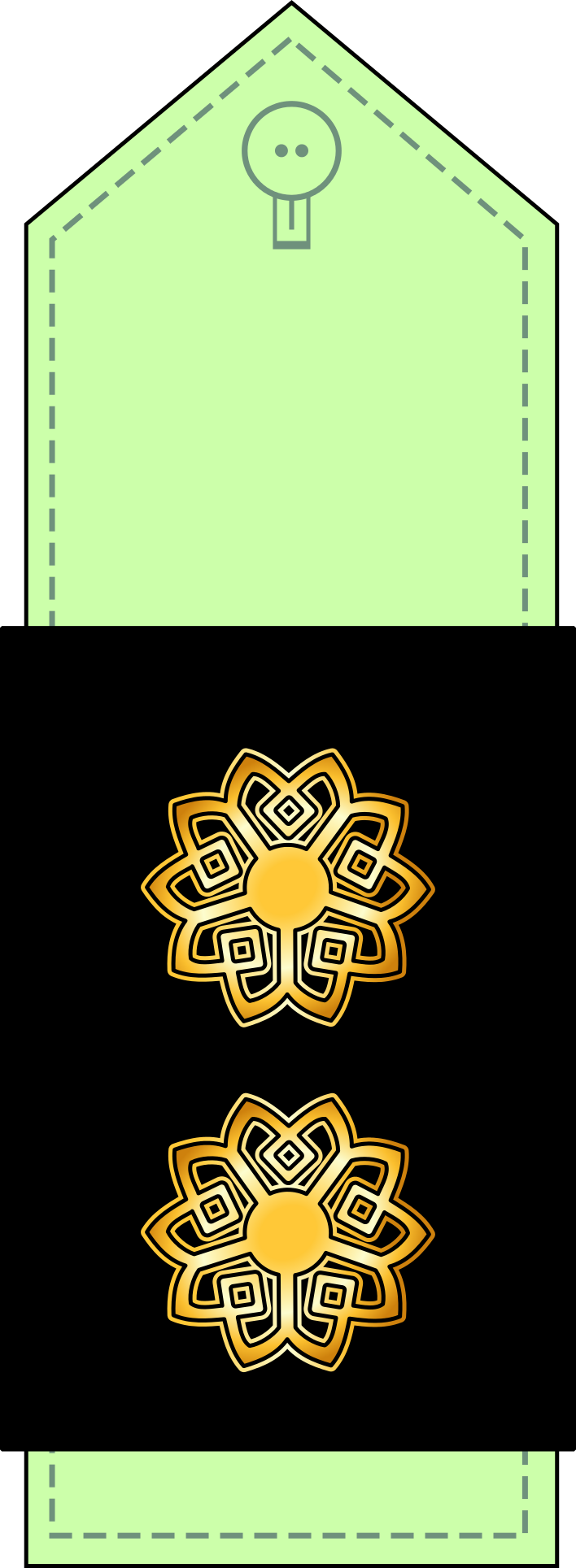
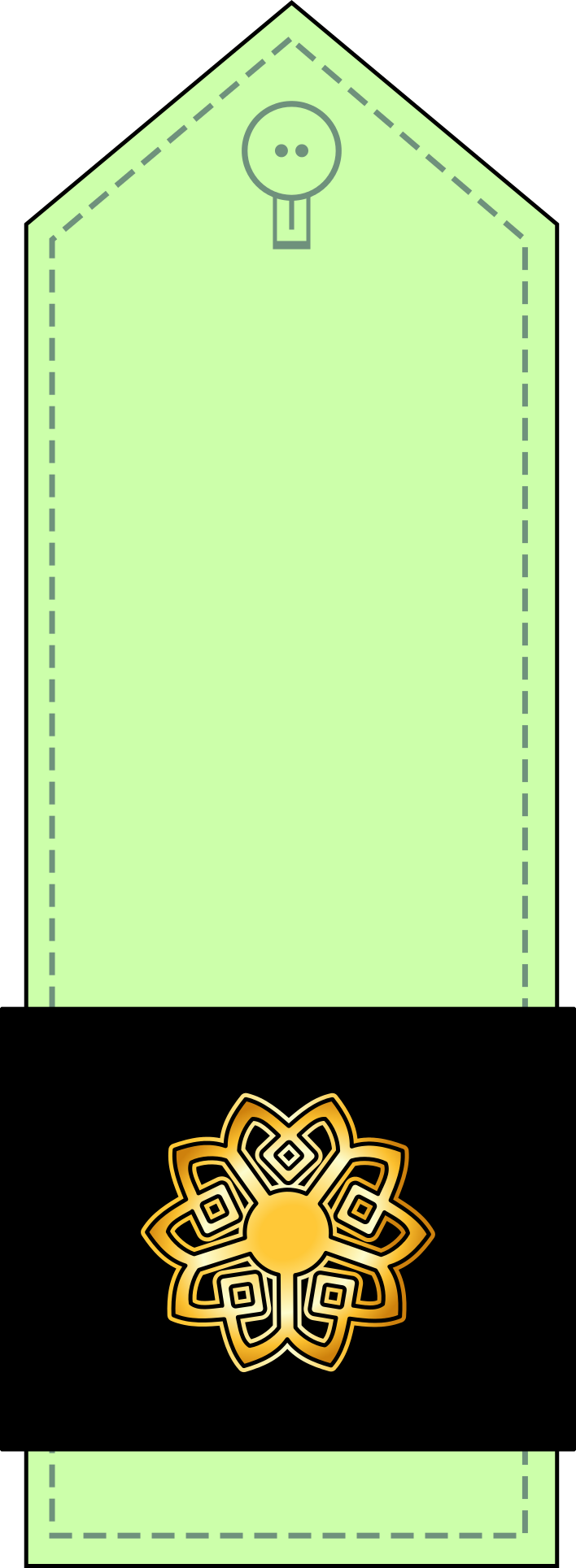
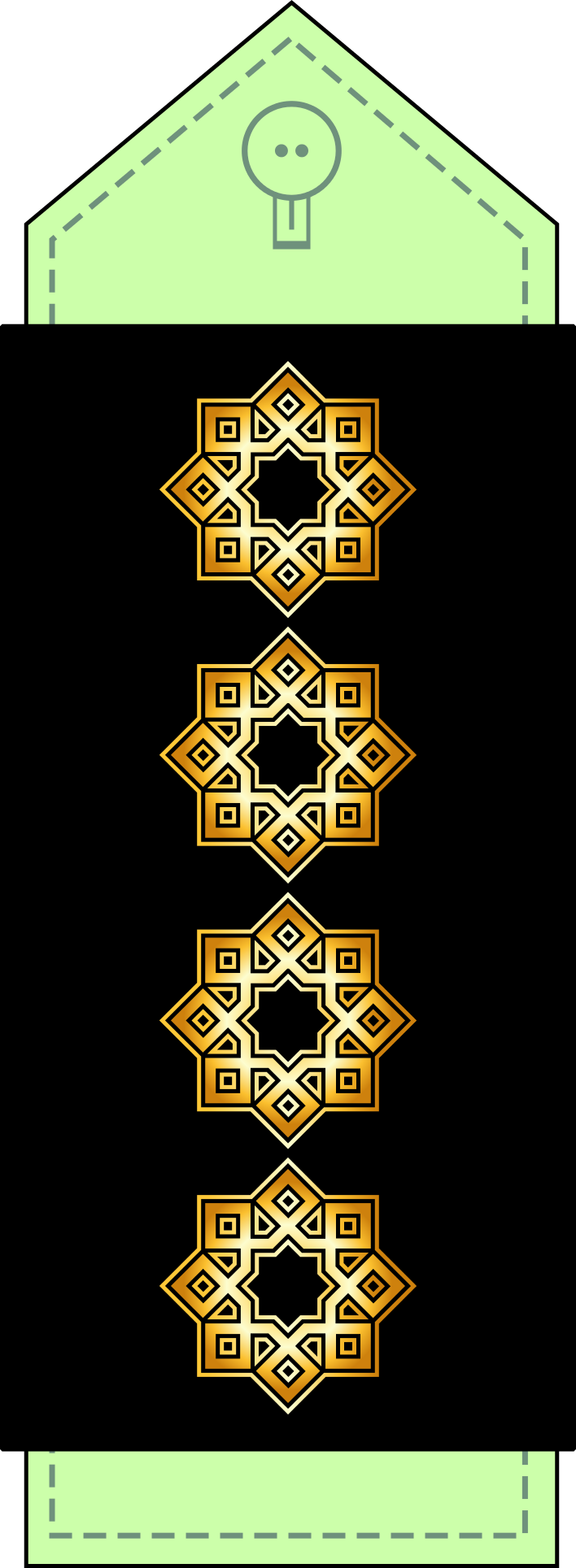
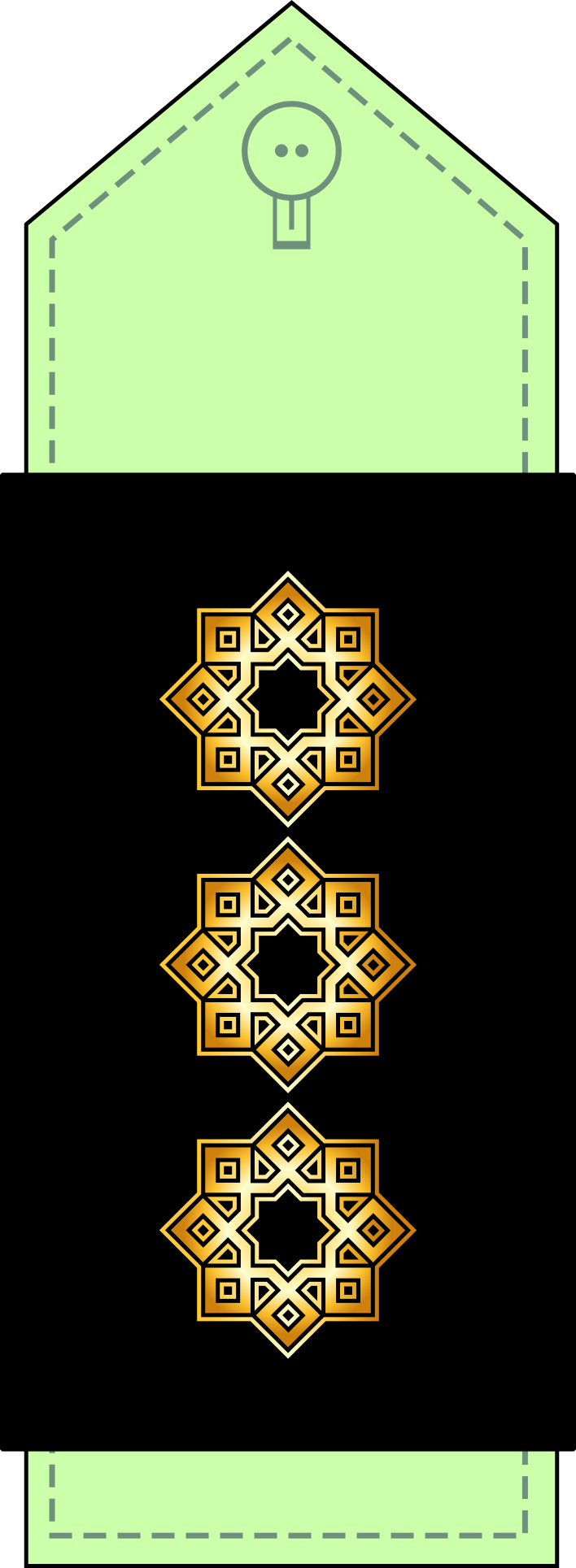
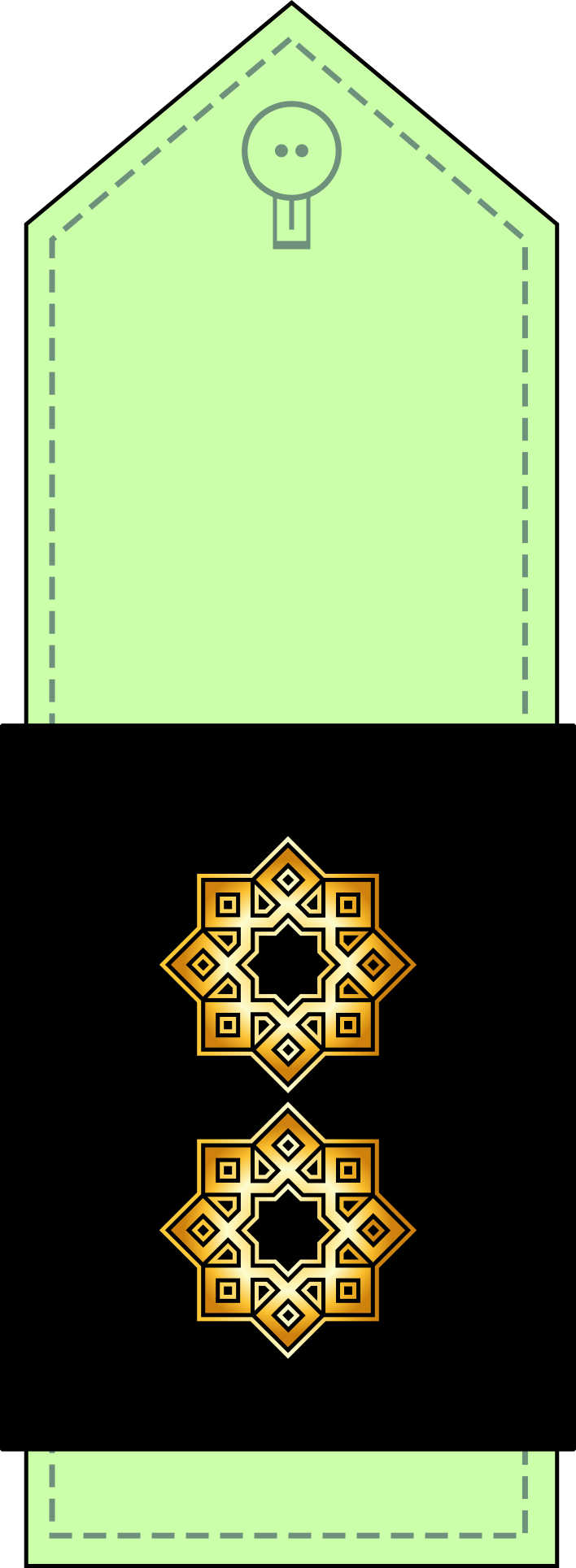
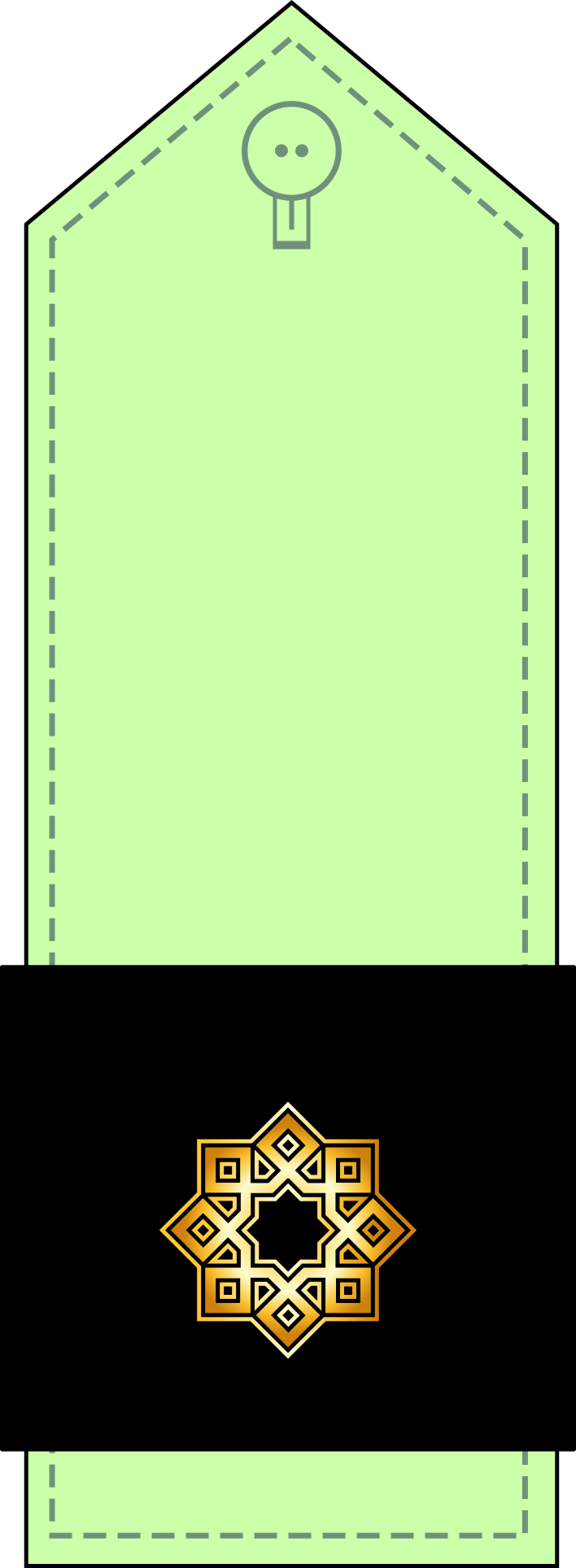
| Rank group | General / flag officers | | | | | Senior officers | | | Junior officers |
|---|---|---|---|---|---|---|---|---|---|---|---|---|
| Police Command of the Islamic Republic of Iran |
| Police Command of the Islamic Republic of Iran | ارتشبد; Arteshbod | سپهبد; Sepahbod | سرلشکر; Sarlashkar | سرتیپ; Sartip | سرتیپ دوم; Sartip dovom | سرهنگ; Sarhang | سرهنگ دوم; Sarhang dovom | سرگرد; Sargord | سروان; Sarvān | ستوان یکم; Sotvān yekom | ستوان دوم; Sotvān dovom | ستوان سوم; Sotvān sevom |

==== Student officer ranks ====
| Rank group | 4th year | 3rd year | 2nd year | 1st year |
|---|---|---|---|---|
| Police Command of the Islamic Republic of Iran; Amin Police Academy |

==== Other ranks ====
The rank insignia of non-commissioned officers and enlisted personnel.

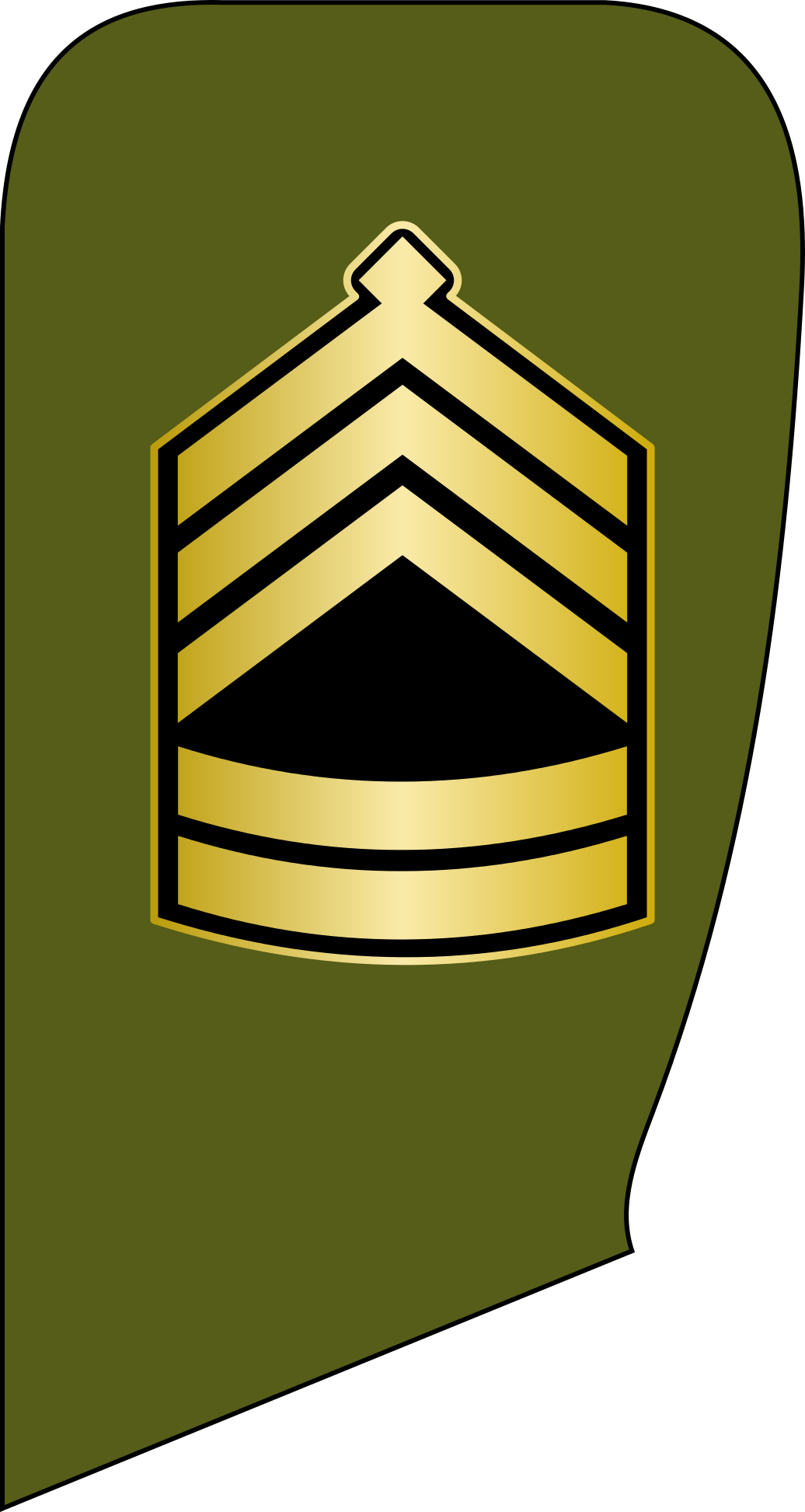
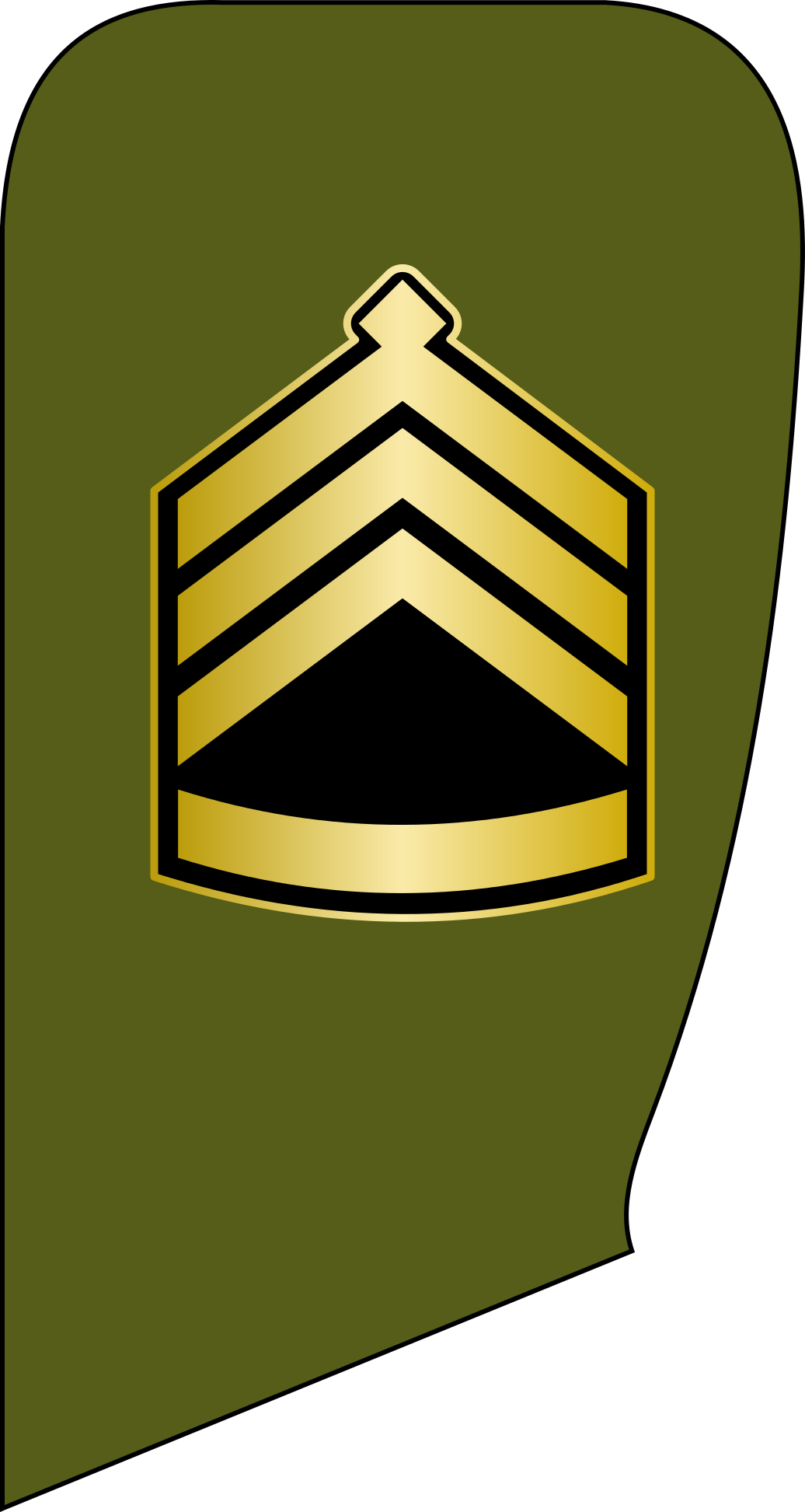
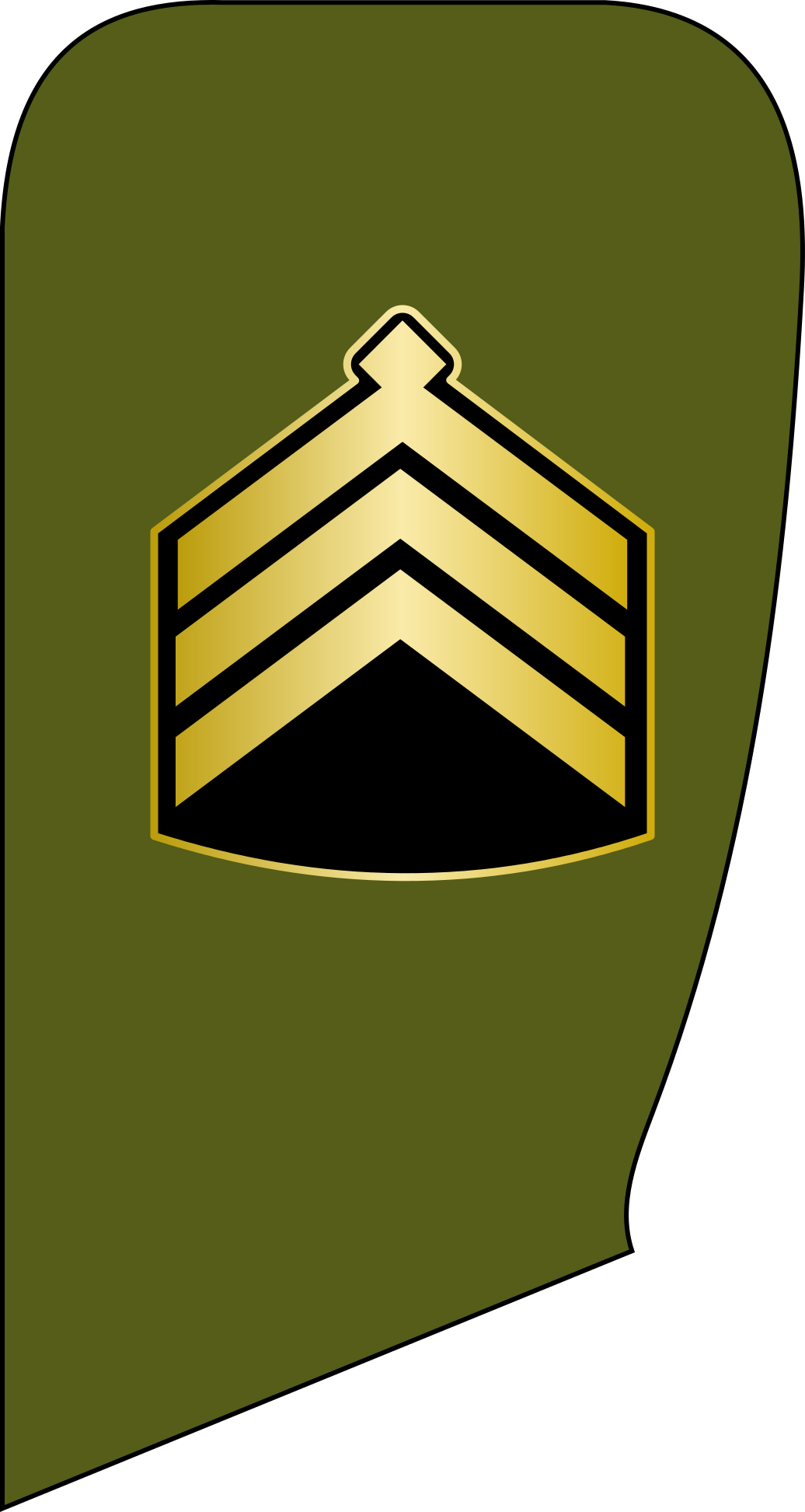
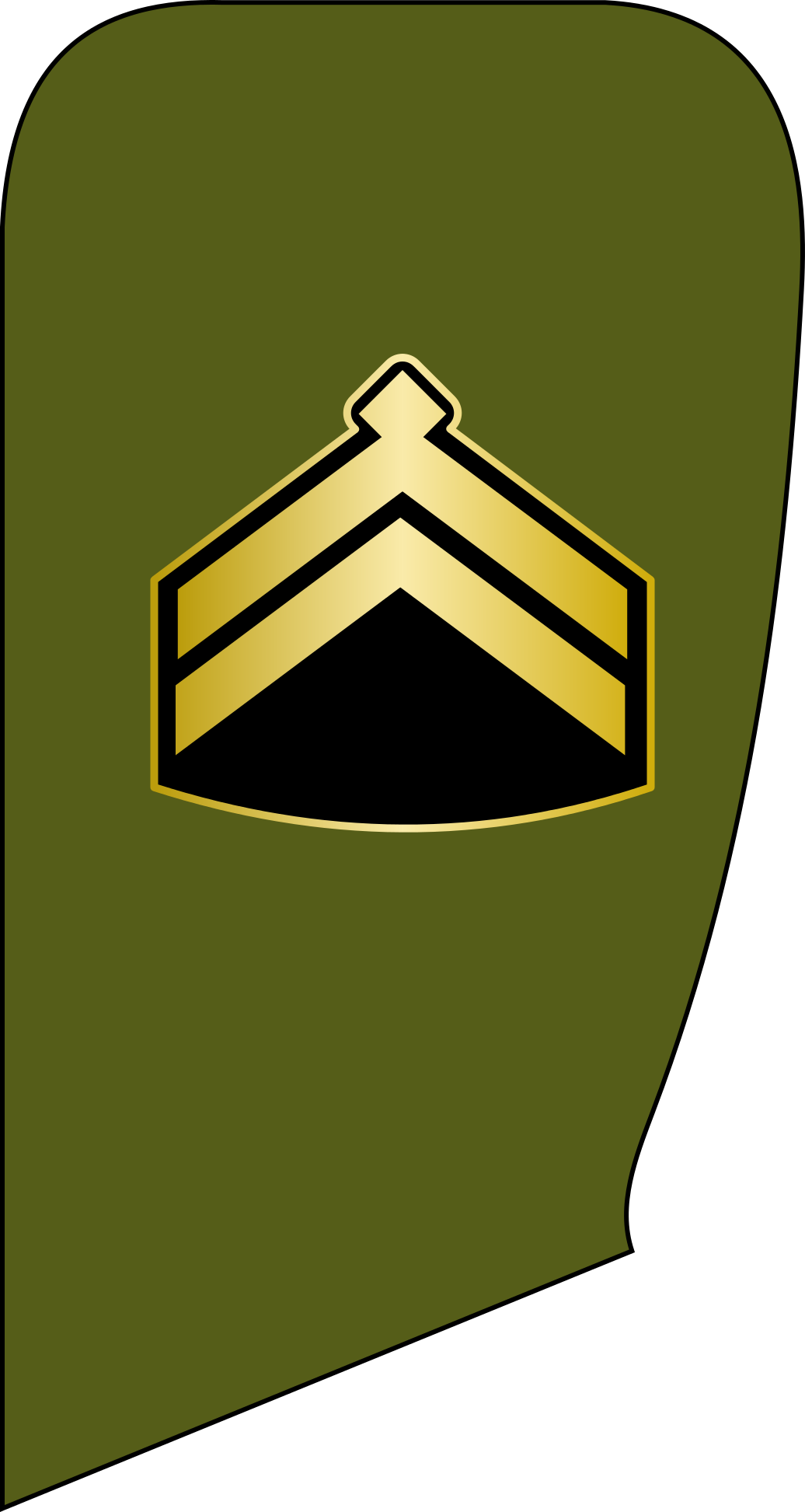
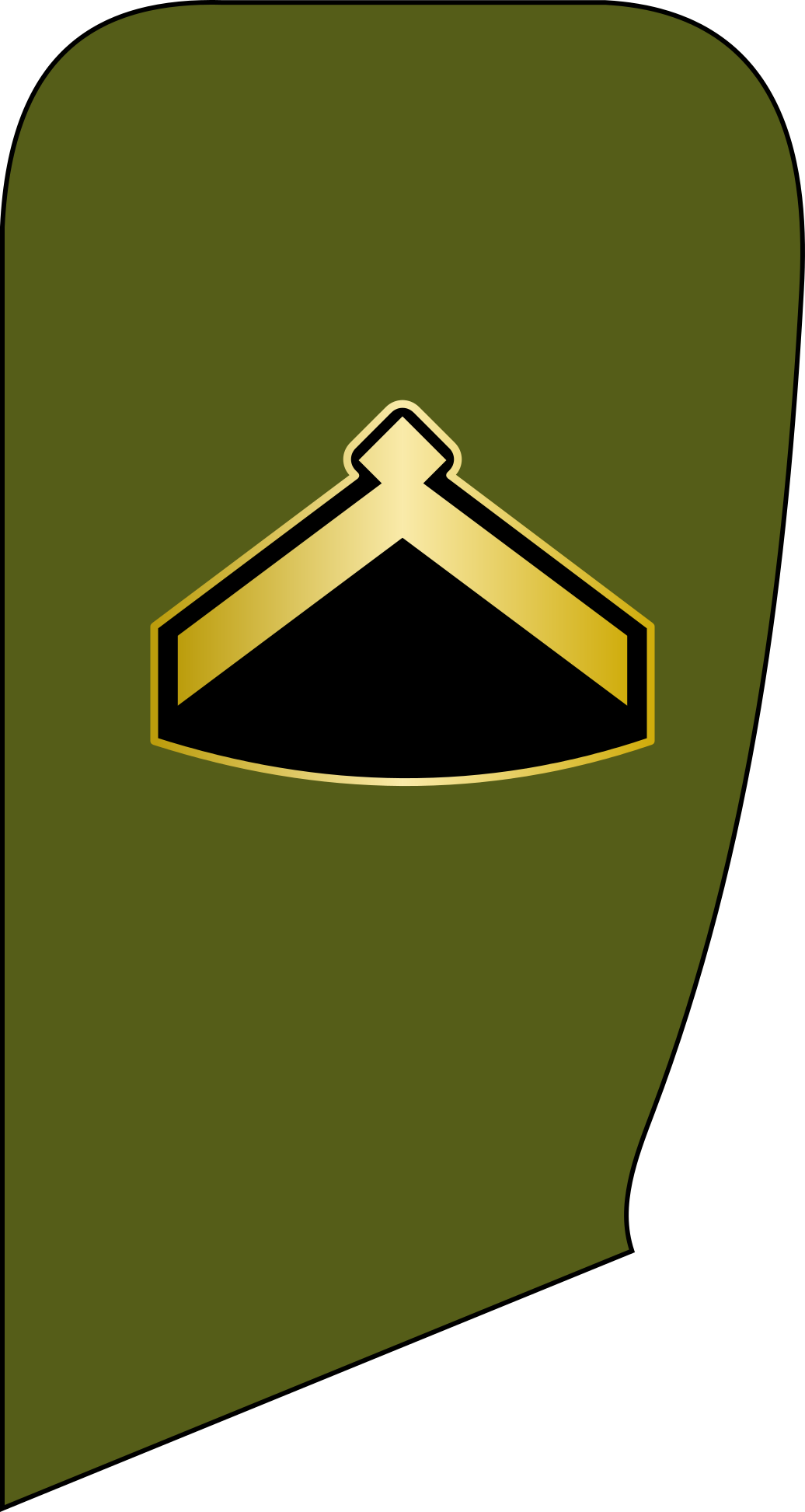
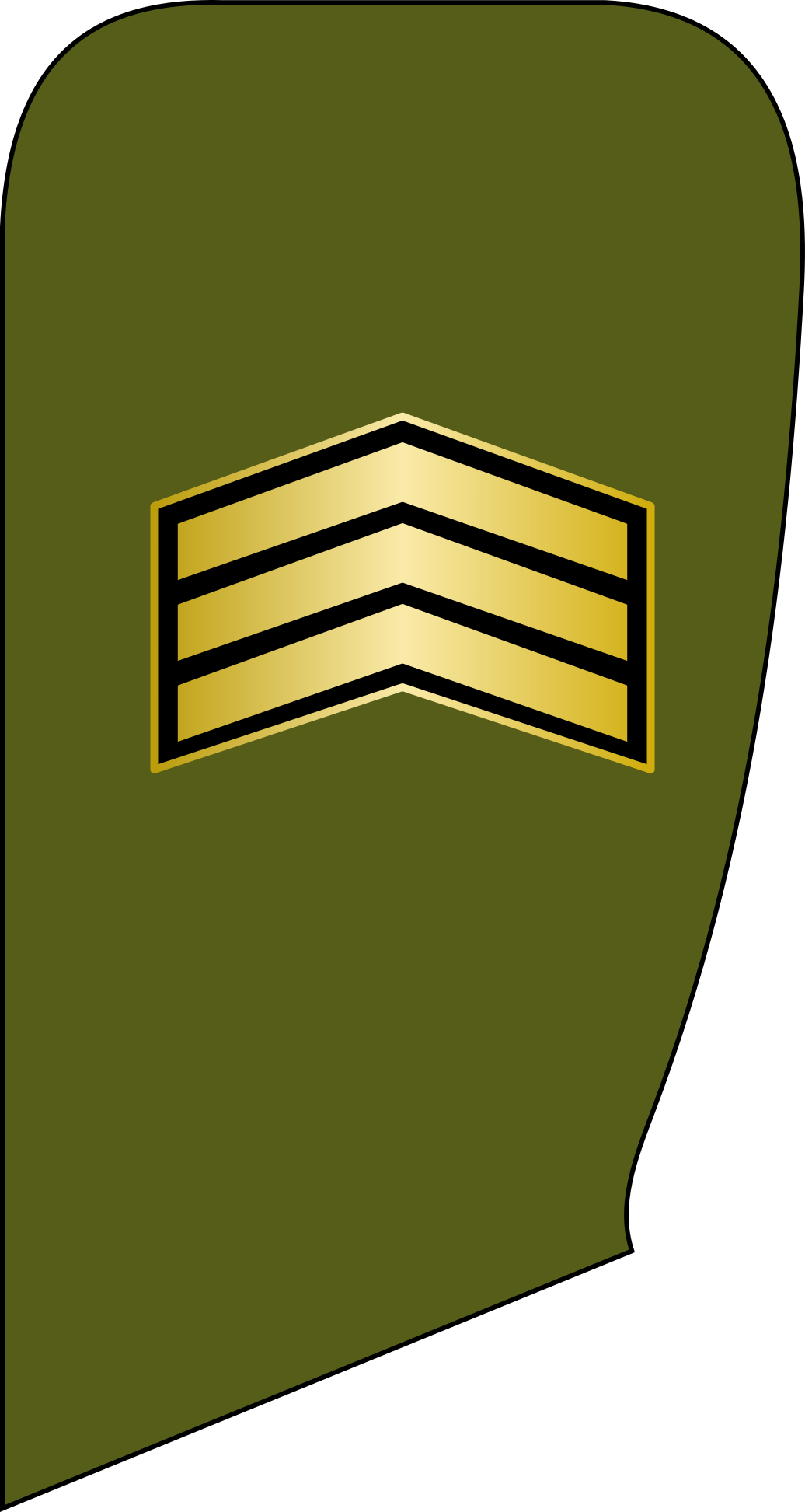
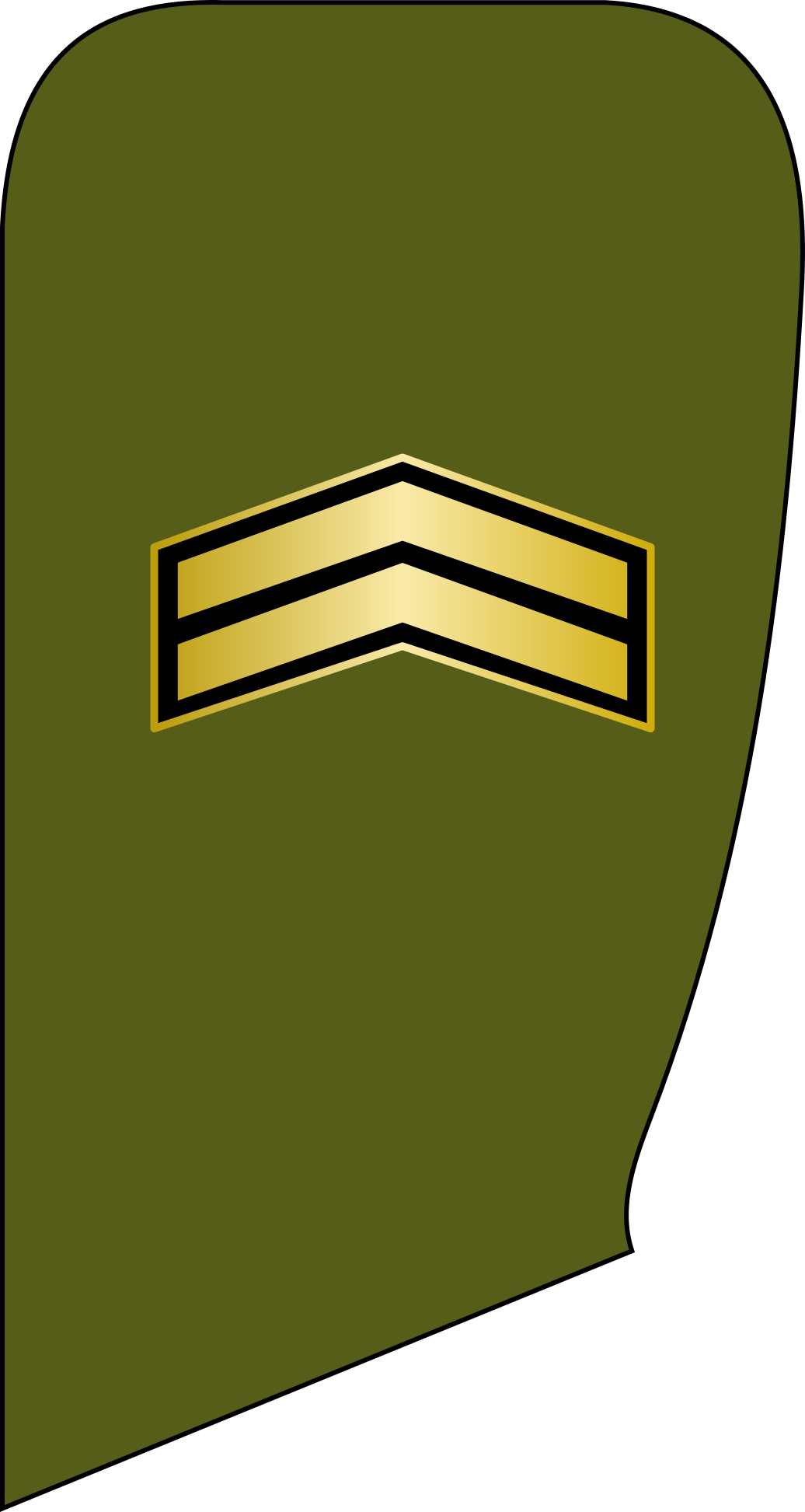
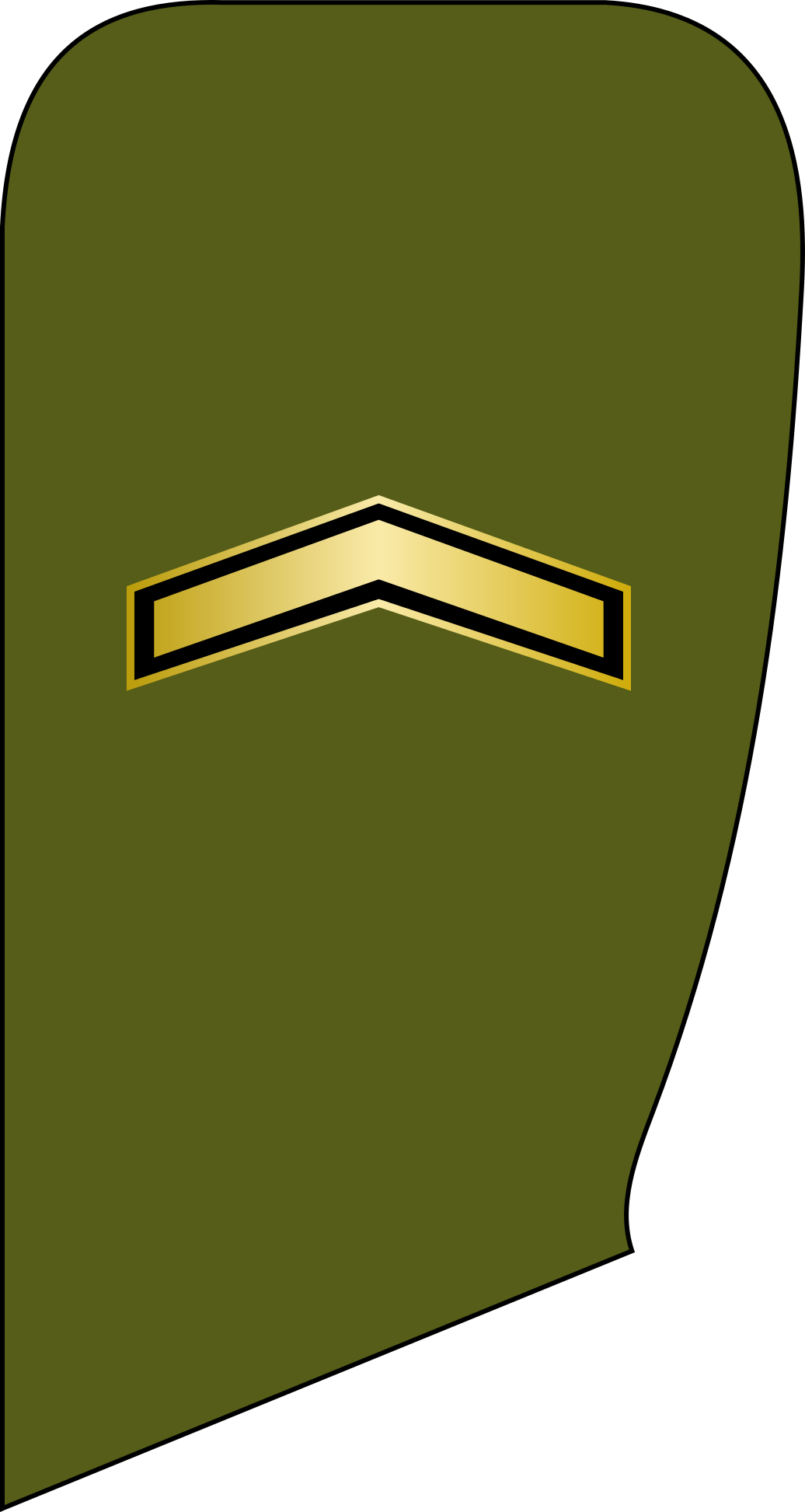
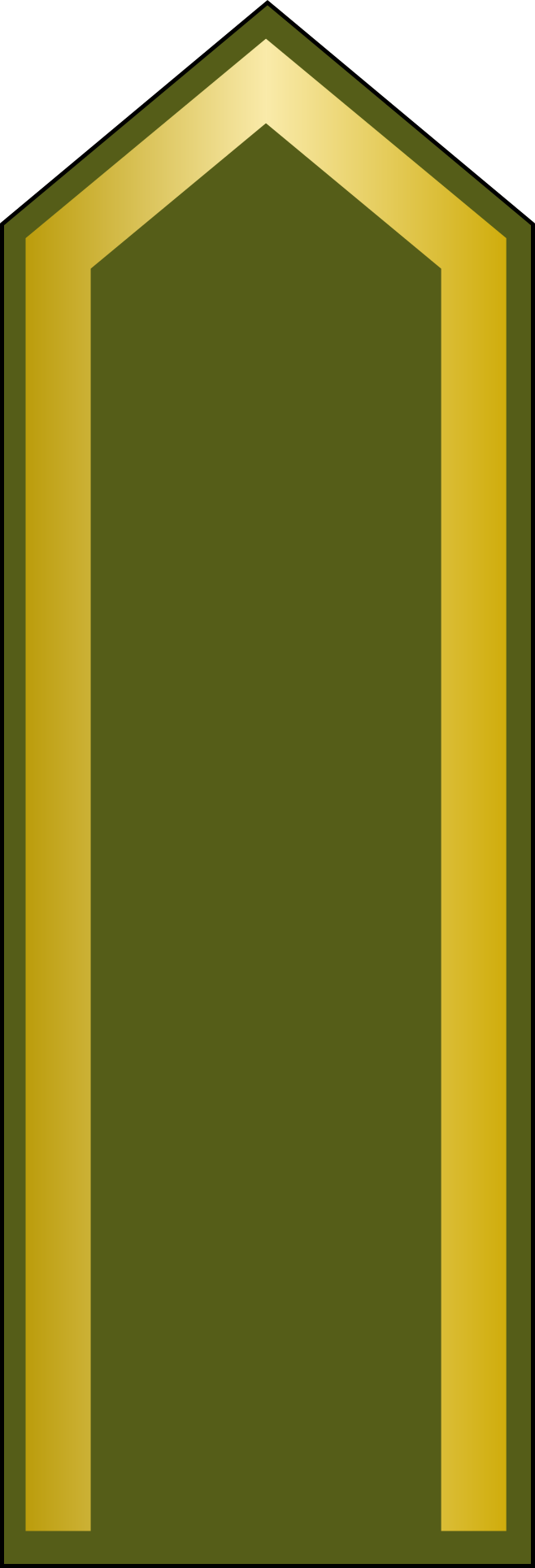
| Rank group | Senior NCOs | | | | | Junior NCOs | | Enlisted |
|---|---|---|---|---|---|---|---|---|---|
| Police Command of the Islamic Republic of Iran |
| Police Command of the Islamic Republic of Iran | استوار یکم; Ostovar yekom | استوار دوم; Ostovar dovom | گروهبان یکم; Goruhban yekom | گروهبان دوم; Goruhban dovom | گروهبان سوم; Goruhban sevom | سرجوخه; Sarjukheh | سرباز یکم; Sarbaz yekom | سرباز دوم; Sarbaz dovom | سرباز; Sarbaz |

=== Natural Resources Protection Unit ranks ===
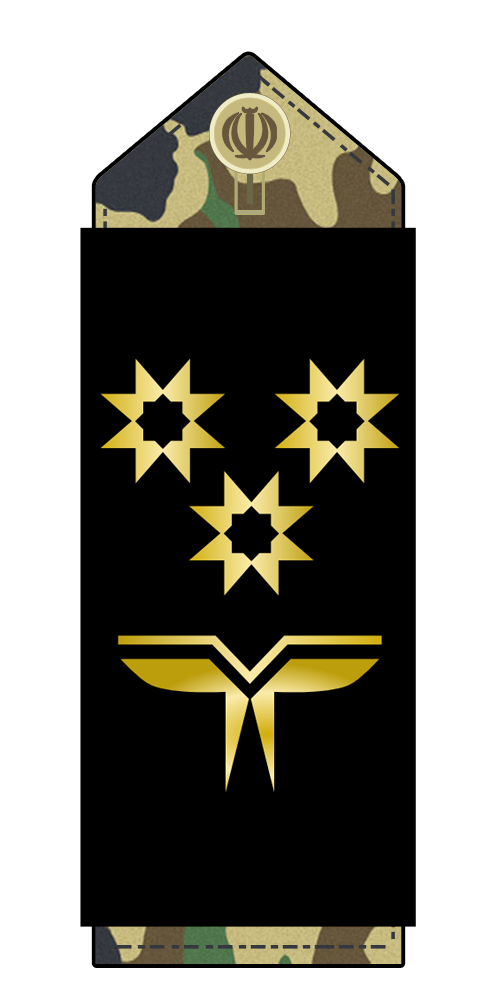
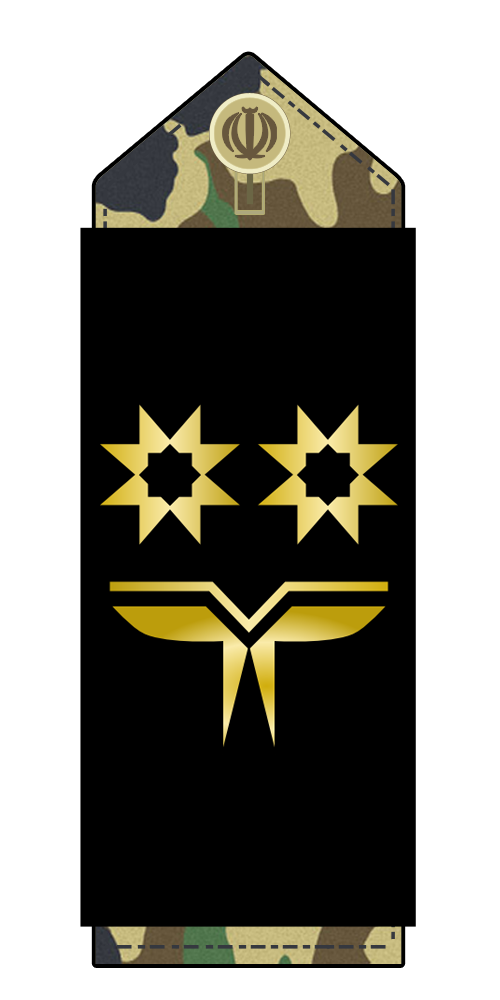
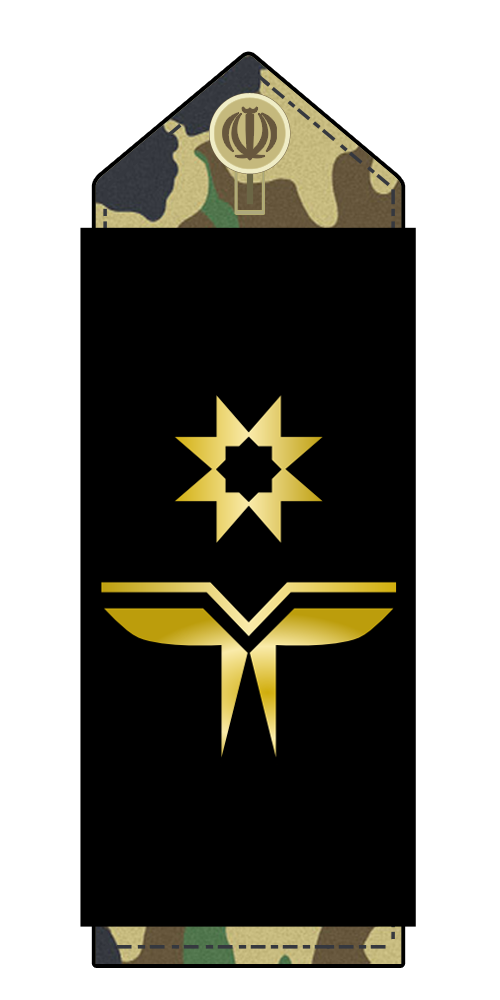
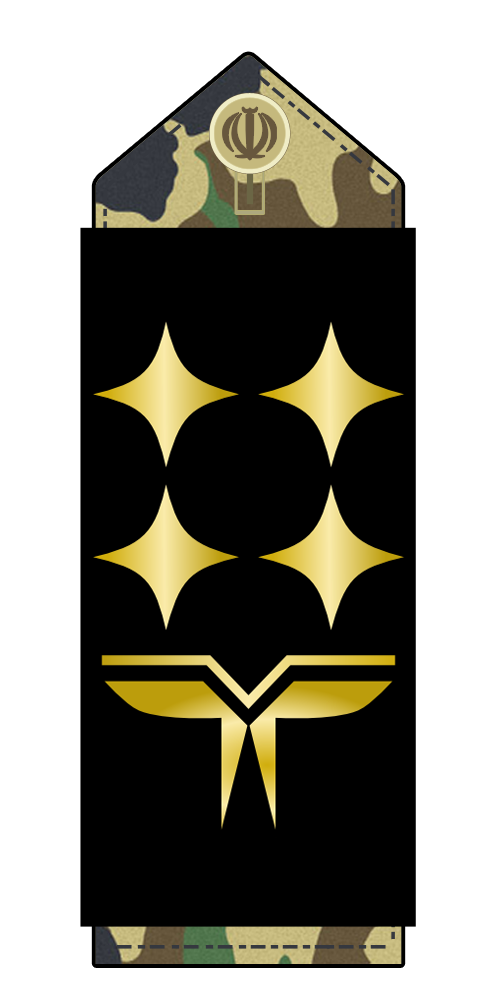
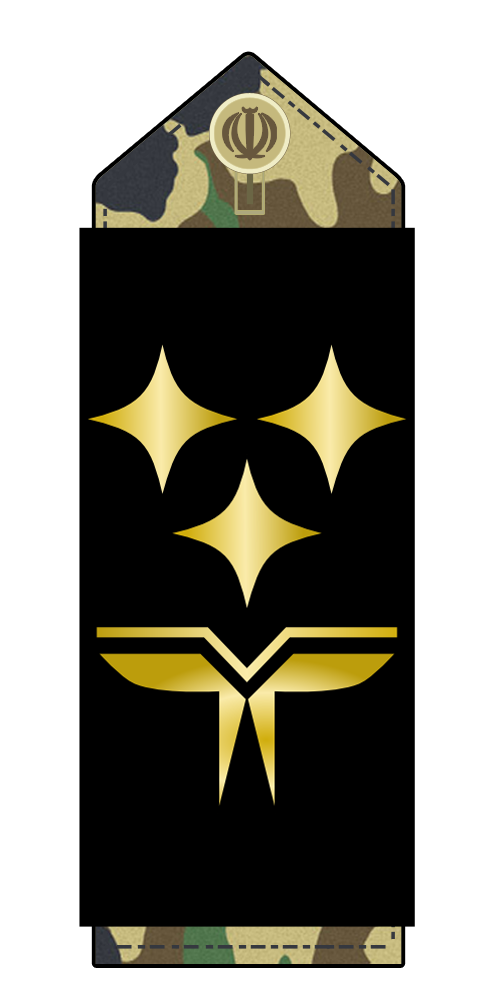
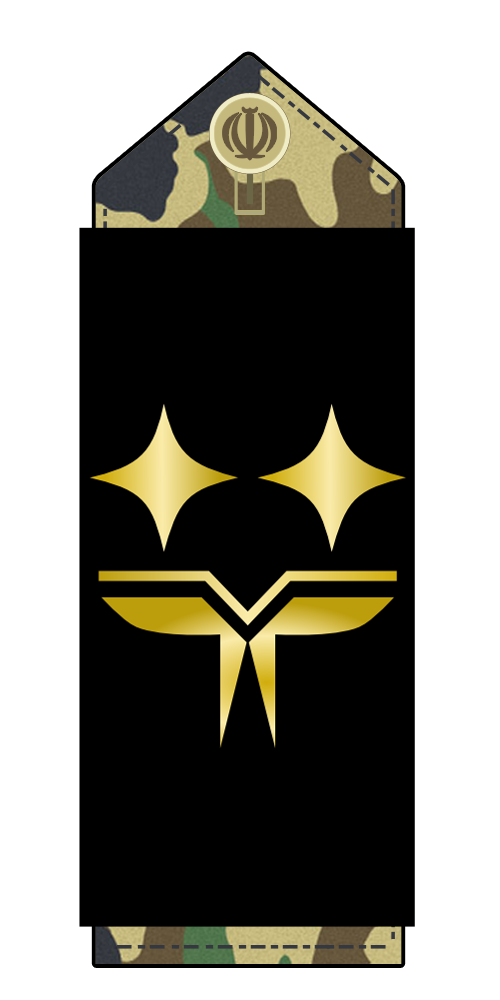
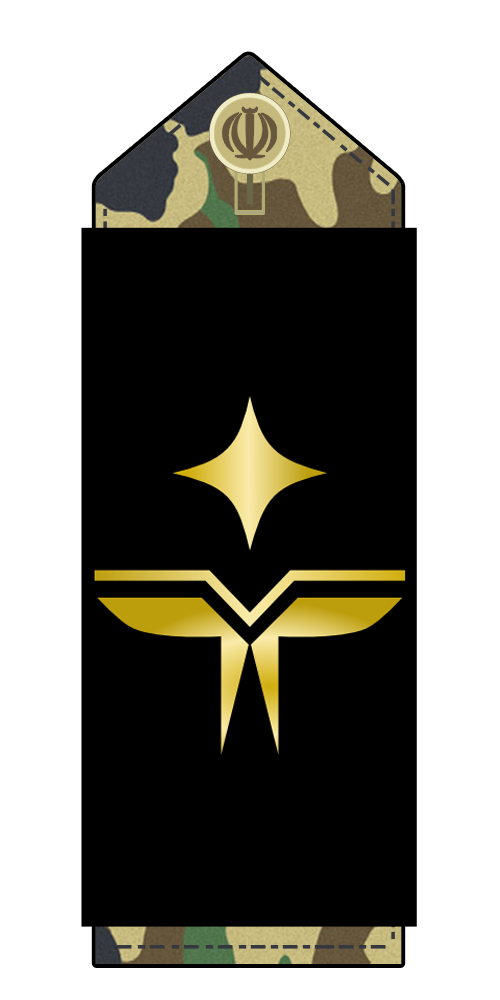
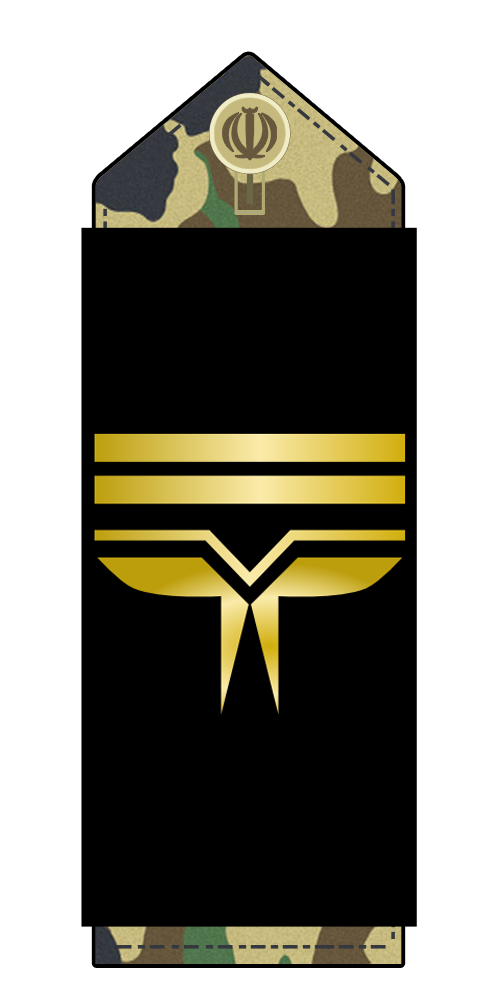
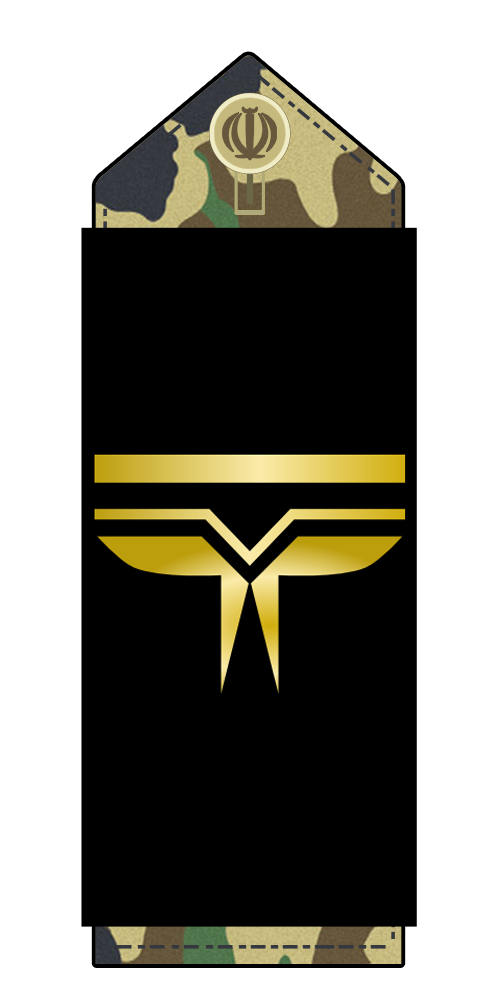
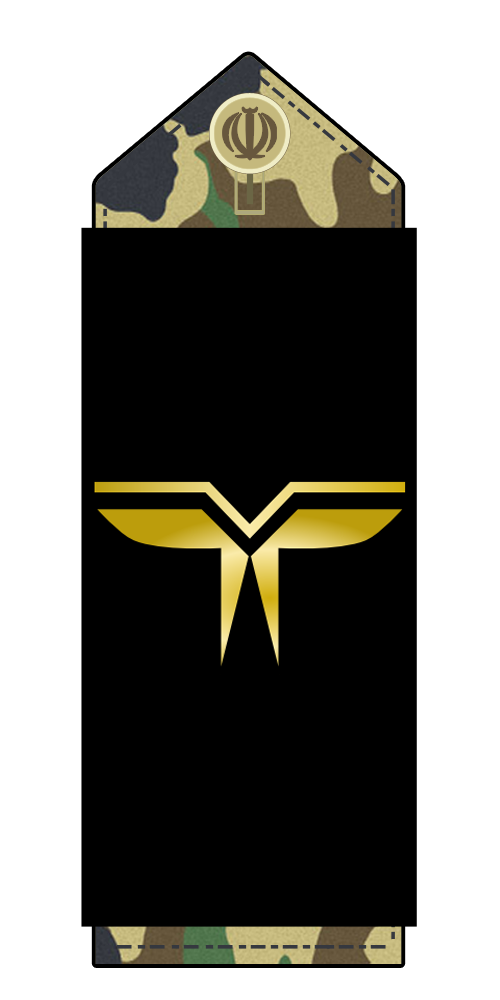
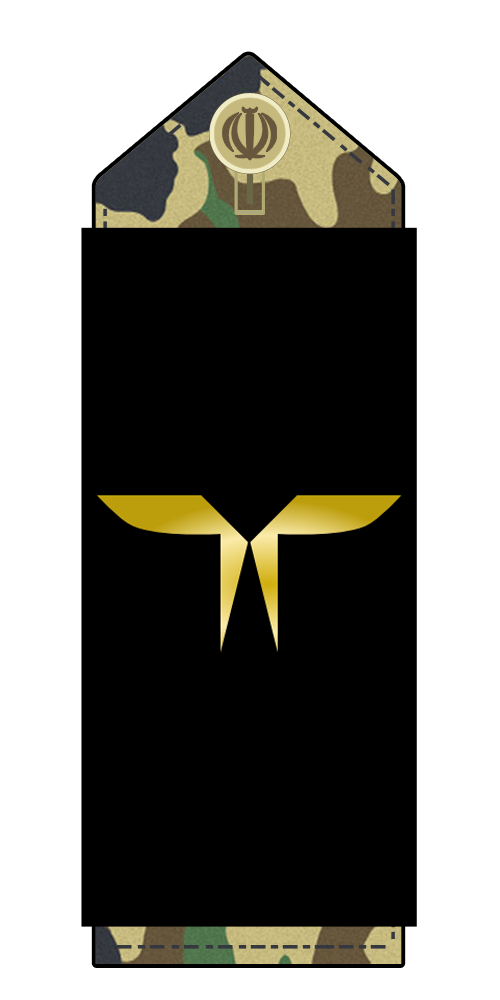
| Rank group | Leadership | | | Middle management | | | | Lower |
|---|---|---|---|---|---|---|---|---|---|---|---|
| Natural Resources Protection Unit |
| Natural Resources Protection Unit | محافظ; Muhafez | محافظ یکم; Muhafez Yekom | محافظ دوم; Muhafez Dovom | حافظ; Hafez | حافظ یکم; Hafez Yekom | حافظ دوم; Hafez Dovom | حافظ سوم; Hafez Sevom | سرپاسیار یکم; SarPasyar Yekom | سرپاسیار دوم; SarPasyar Dovom | پاسیار یکم; Pasyar Yekom | پاسیار دوم; Pasyar Dovom |

== See also ==
- Military ranks of Imperial Iran
- Armed Forces of the Islamic Republic of Iran
