= Second brigadier general (Iran) =

Military rank in Iran

Sartip dovom سرتیپ دوم (Persian)
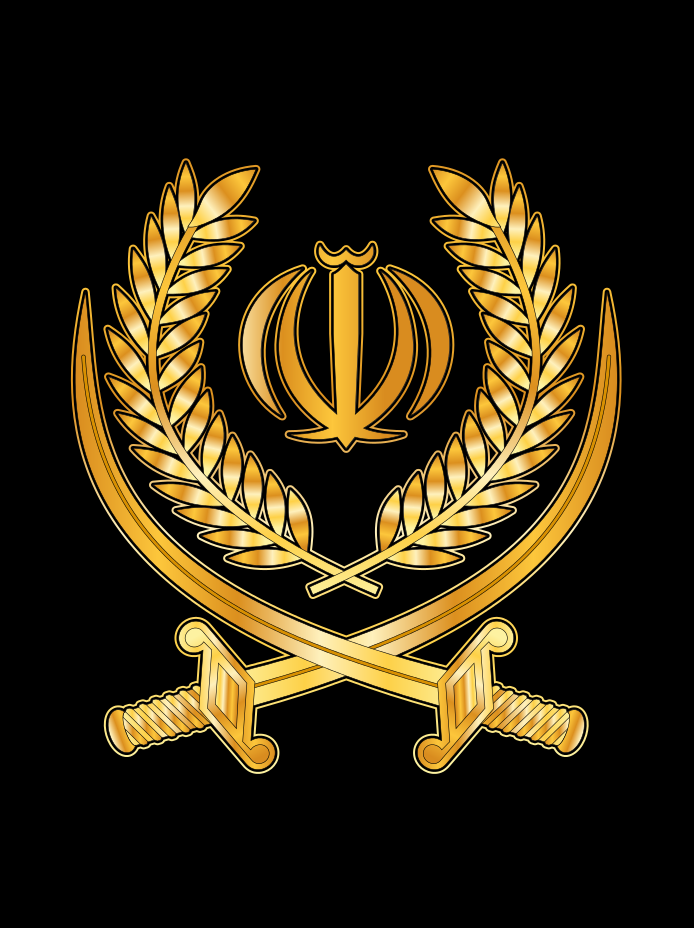
- Insignia
- Country: Iran
- Service branch: Iranian Ground Forces; Iranian Air Force; Iranian Air Defense Force; Revolutionary Guard Ground Forces; Revolutionary Guard Aerospace Force; Iranian Law Enforcement Command
- Rank group: General officer
- Formation: 1987
- Next higher rank: Sartip (brigadier general)
- Next lower rank: Sarhang (colonel)

Second brigadier general (Persian: سرتیپ دوم, romanized: Sartip dovom, lit. 'Second brigade leader') is a senior military rank in the armed forces of Iran. The rank was introduced in 1987 as part of a new modified ranking system. Currently, there is no equivalent for the rank of second brigadier general in other countries. It is the lowest ranking general officer rank in the armed forces of Iran and lies between the ranks of colonel and brigadier general. However, the equivalent rank in the Iranian navy is the rank of Second flotilla admiral.

In Persian, the word second brigadier general translates to sar-tip dovom. Sar translates to head or commander, tip translates to brigade, and dovom translates to second. The Islamic Revolutionary Guards Corps (IRGC) and Iranian Law Enforcement Forces (NAJA) also use this rank; the difference is in salutation. Second brigadier generals of the regular military (Artesh) are referred to as amir sar-tip dovom. While second brigadier generals of the IRGC and NAJA are referred to as sar-tip dovom e pasdar. The addition of pasdar distinguishes the three branches of the Iranian armed forces as pasdar translates to guardian, a term often given to IRGC and NAJA personnel.

For IRGC personnel, promotion to the rank of second brigadier general, takes three years, while for the regular military (Artesh) it takes four. For this reason, a near majority of Artesh personnel retire with the rank of colonel, while in the IRGC, a large number settle at second brigadier general.

== Insignia ==
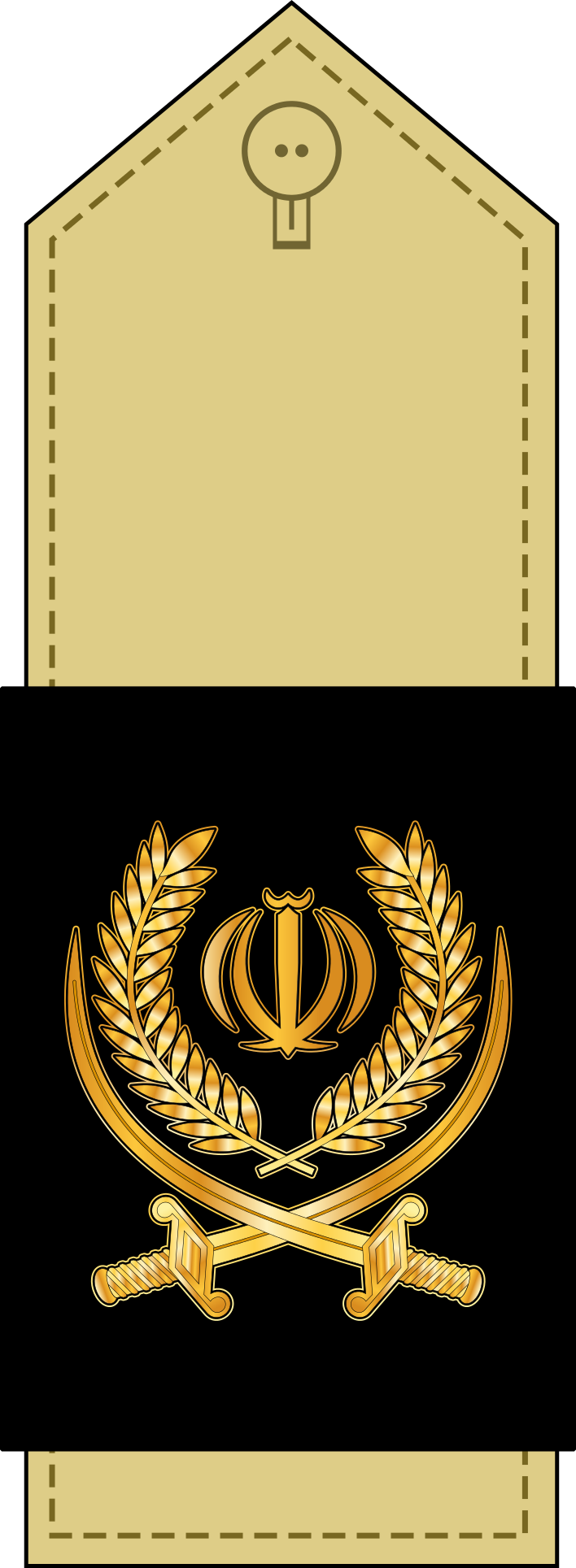
Islamic Republic of Iran Army Ground Forces insignia

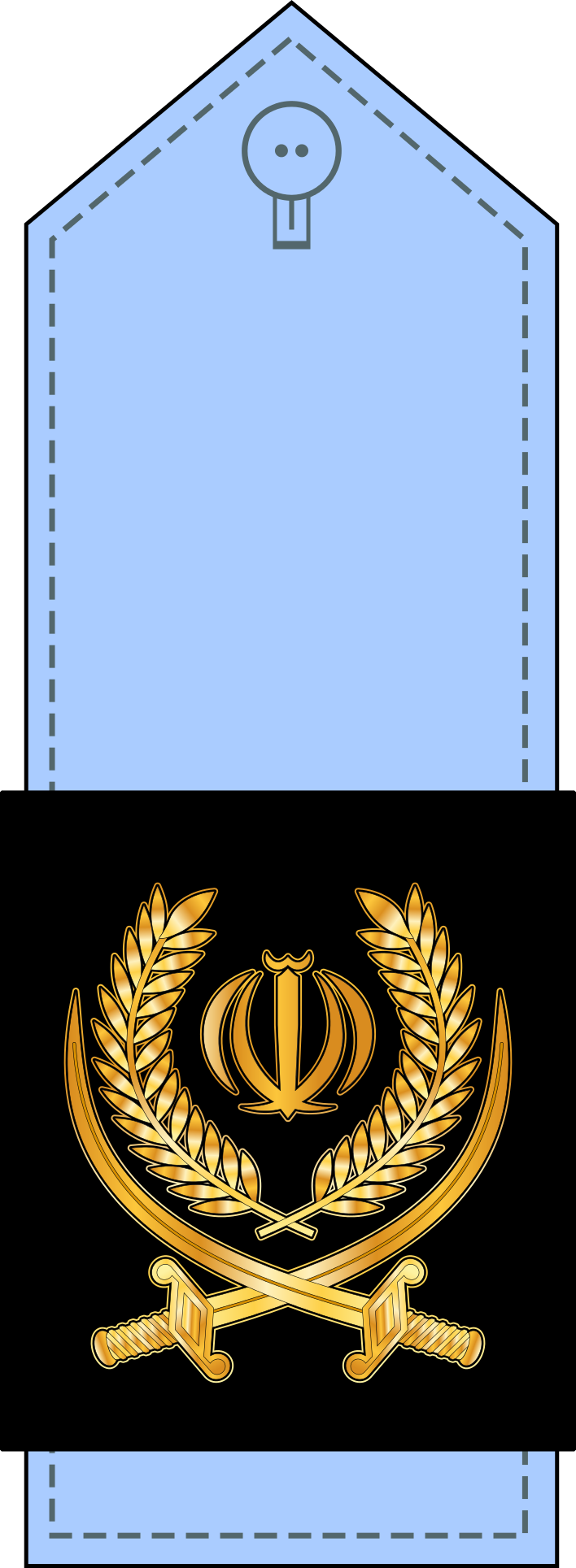
Islamic Republic of Iran Air Force insignia

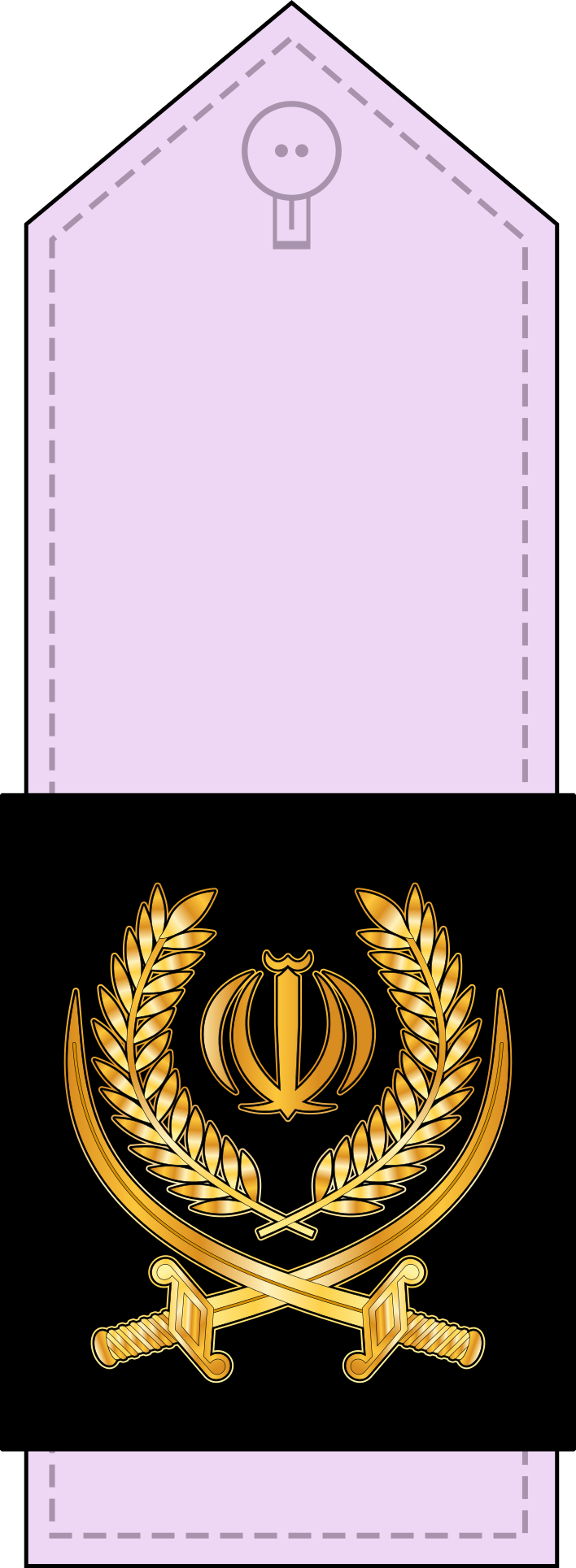
Islamic Republic of Iran Air Defense Force insignia

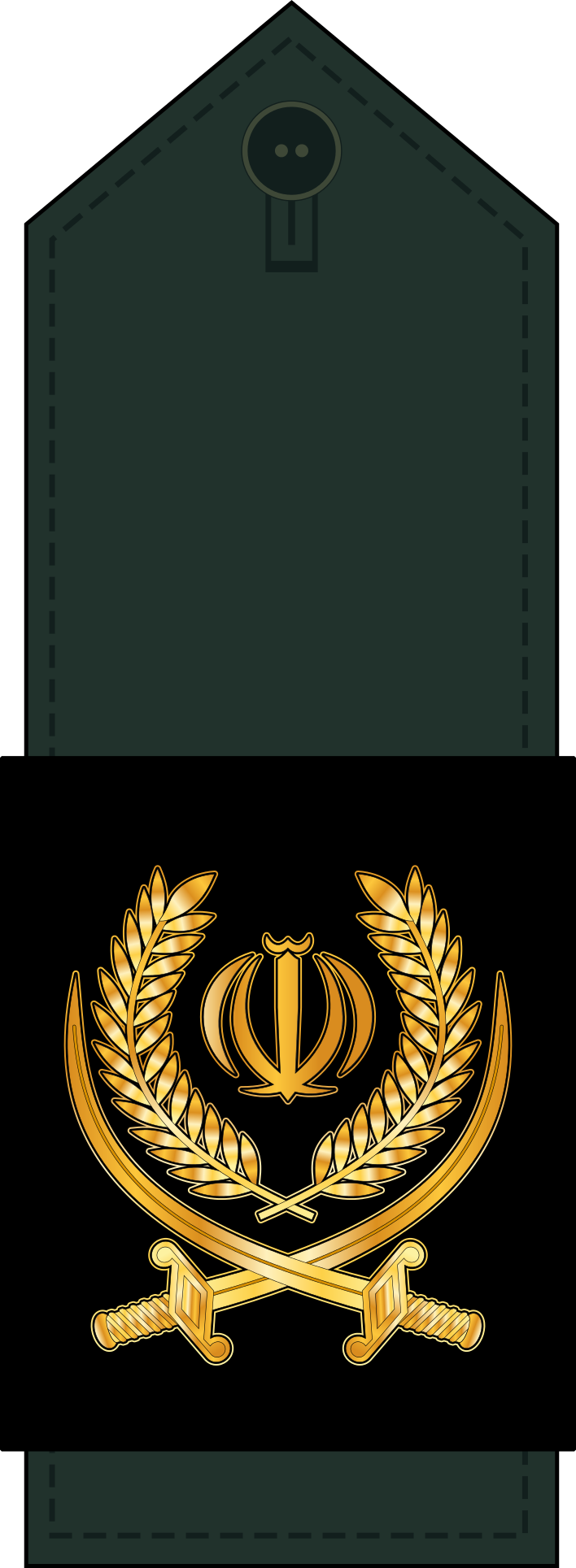
Islamic Revolutionary Guard Corps insignia

Law Enforcement Force of the Islamic Republic of Iran

== See also ==
- Rank insignia of the Iranian military
- Rank Insignia of the Islamic Revolutionary Guard Corps
- Military ranks of Imperial Iran
- Sarhang (rank)
- Spahbed
