= Iranian International Police =

International Police of NAJA (Persian: پلیس بین‌الملل ناجا) is part of Law Enforcement Command of Islamic Republic of Iran in charge of extradition and tasked to cooperate with INTERPOL. Second Brigadier General Majid Karimi is currently head of the department. The department is a National Central Bureau since 28 February 1938.
