= Sarhang (rank) =

Military rank in Iran

Sarhang سرهنگ (Persian)
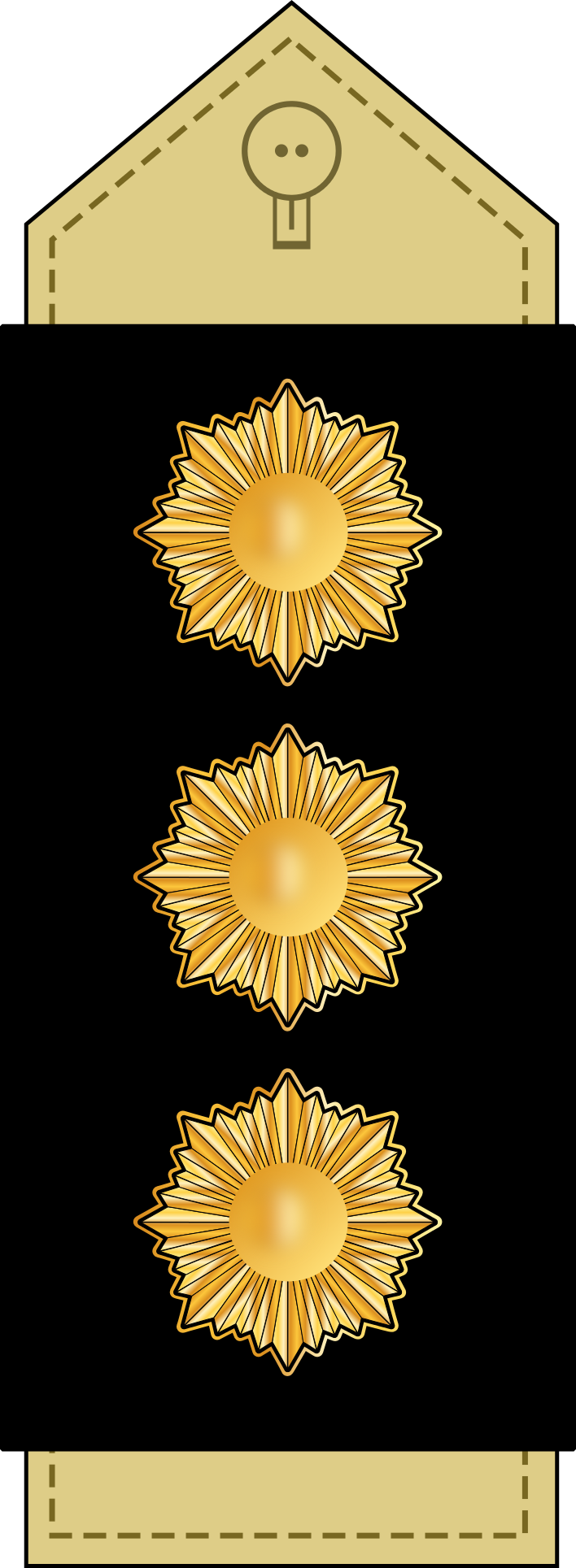
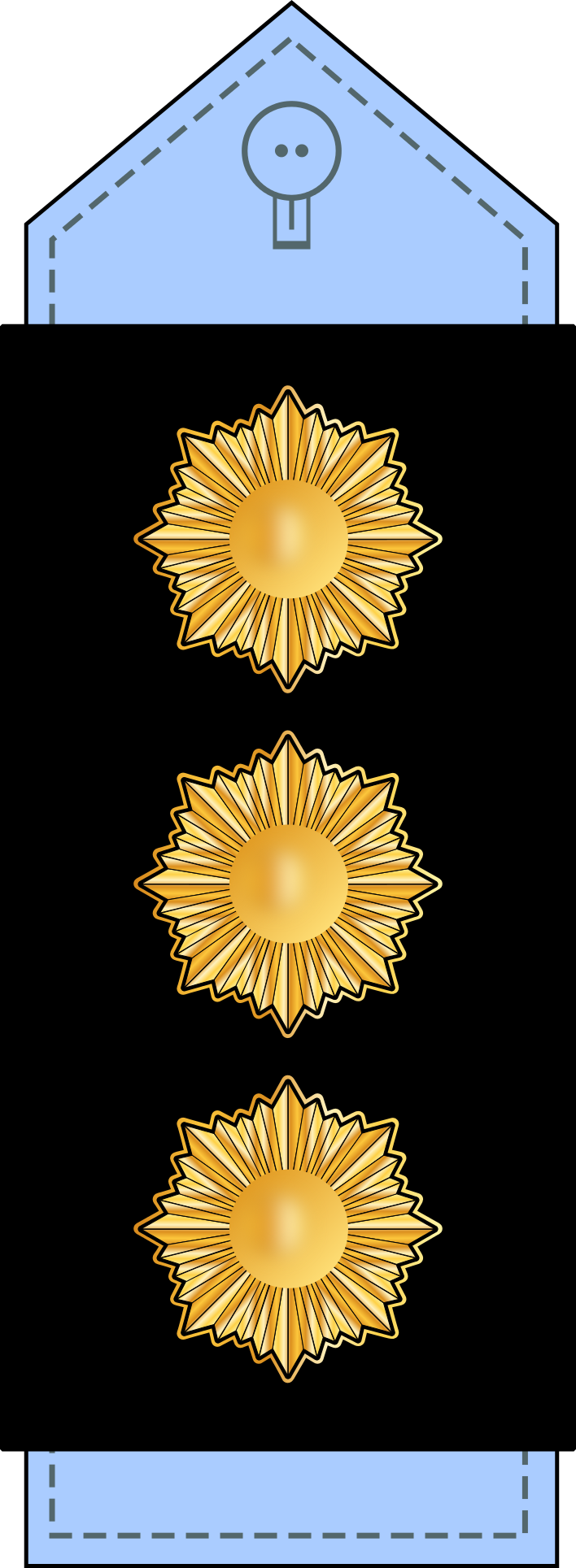
- Army and Air force insignia

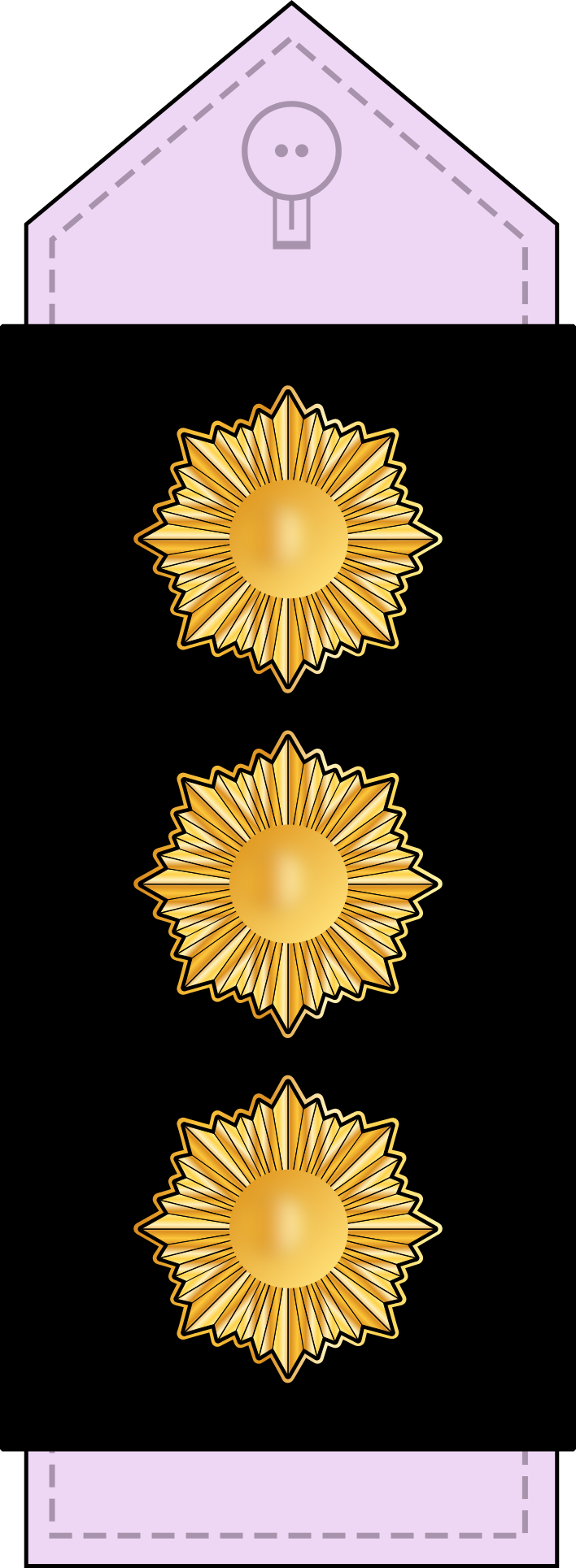
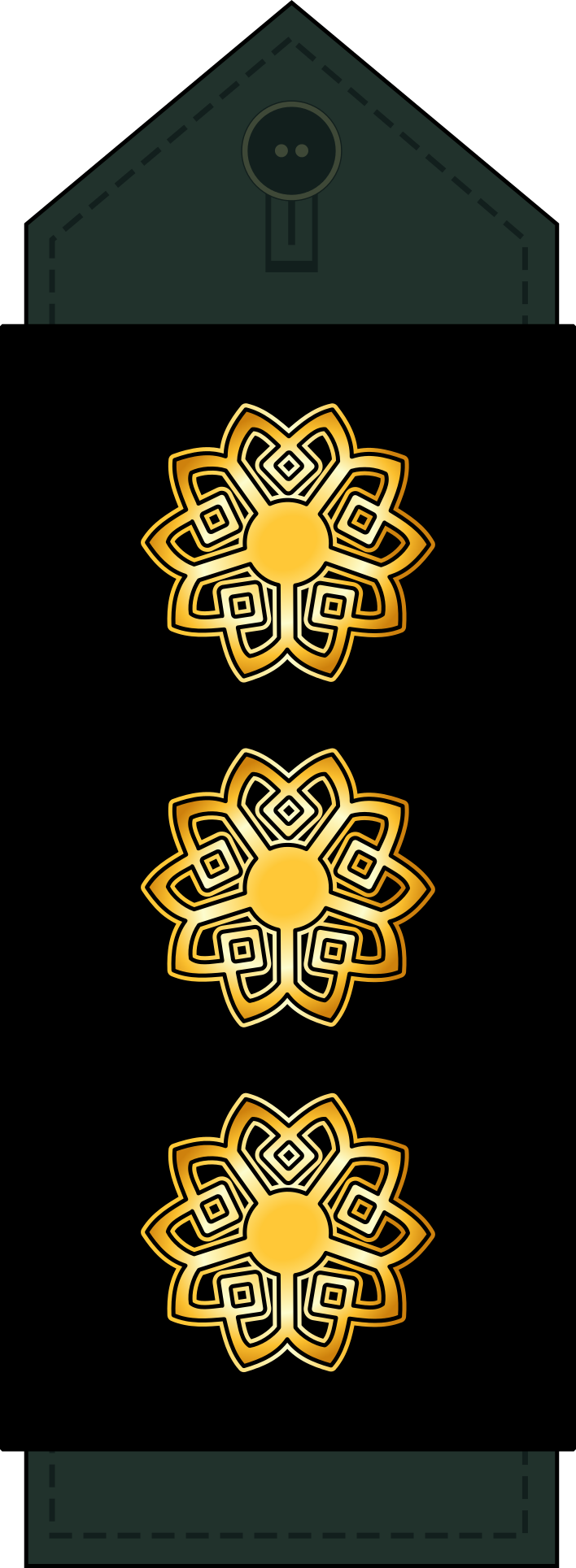
- Air Defense and Revolutionary Guard insignia
- Country: Iran
- Service branch: Iranian Ground Forces; Iranian Air Force; Iranian Air Defense Force; Revolutionary Guard Ground Forces; Revolutionary Guard Aerospace Force; Iranian Police Command
- Next higher rank: Sartip dovom
- Next lower rank: Sarhang dovom
- Equivalent ranks: Colonel (Anglophone)

Sarhang (Persian: سرهنگ, lit. 'chief of the regiment') is a title and military rank of Iranian origin, a compound of sar ("head, chief") and hang ("regiment"). In modern usage in Iran, sarhang is the equivalent of colonel.

== History ==
The origin of the title sarhang may date back at least to the Parthian period. In the Sasanian period, it was a rank in the hierarchy of the aswaran cavalry force. In the medieval period, sarhang has been defined as "a heroic man, a brave fighter, a night-guard". According to Ibn al-Balkhi, the rank was immediately below spāhbadh. In Tārikh-i Bukhārā, the title is ranked below amīr. In early Islamic period, the title appears together with ayyār, and a related title, sarhang-shumārān, seems to belong to the leaders of the hierarchy of ayyārān. According to Bosworth, sarhangs were separate from ayyars, and were probably fighters with outstanding leadership or fighting qualities that were recruited from the latter.

Historical figures recorded as bearing this title include:

- Jalinus of the late Sasanian Empire
- Hasan ibn Muhammad ibn Tālūt (حسن بن محمد بن طالوت), serving the caliph Al-Musta'in
- Wazīr ibn Ayyūb (وزير بن أيوب), serving the amīr of Khurasan
- Kharra Khusraw (خره خسرو), son of Badhan (per al-Tabari)
- Bu-Ali Kutwal (بوعلی کوتوال), a Ghaznavid officer

== See also ==
- Rank insignia of the Iranian military
- Rank Insignia of the Islamic Revolutionary Guard Corps
- Military ranks of Imperial Iran
- Second brigadier general (Iran)
- Spahbed
