= Rank insignia of the Islamic Revolutionary Guard Corps =

Military insignia

This is a list of rank insignia used by the Islamic Revolutionary Guard Corps (IRGC) in Iran.

== Rank insignia chart ==
Officers

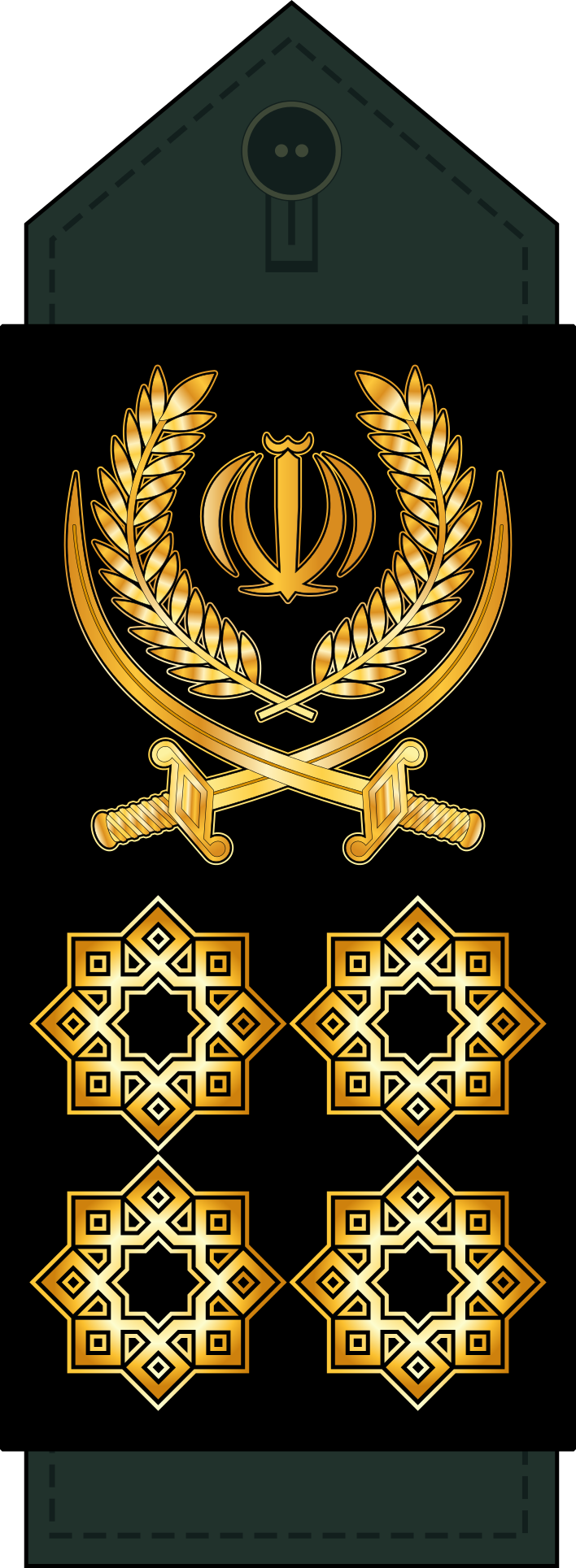
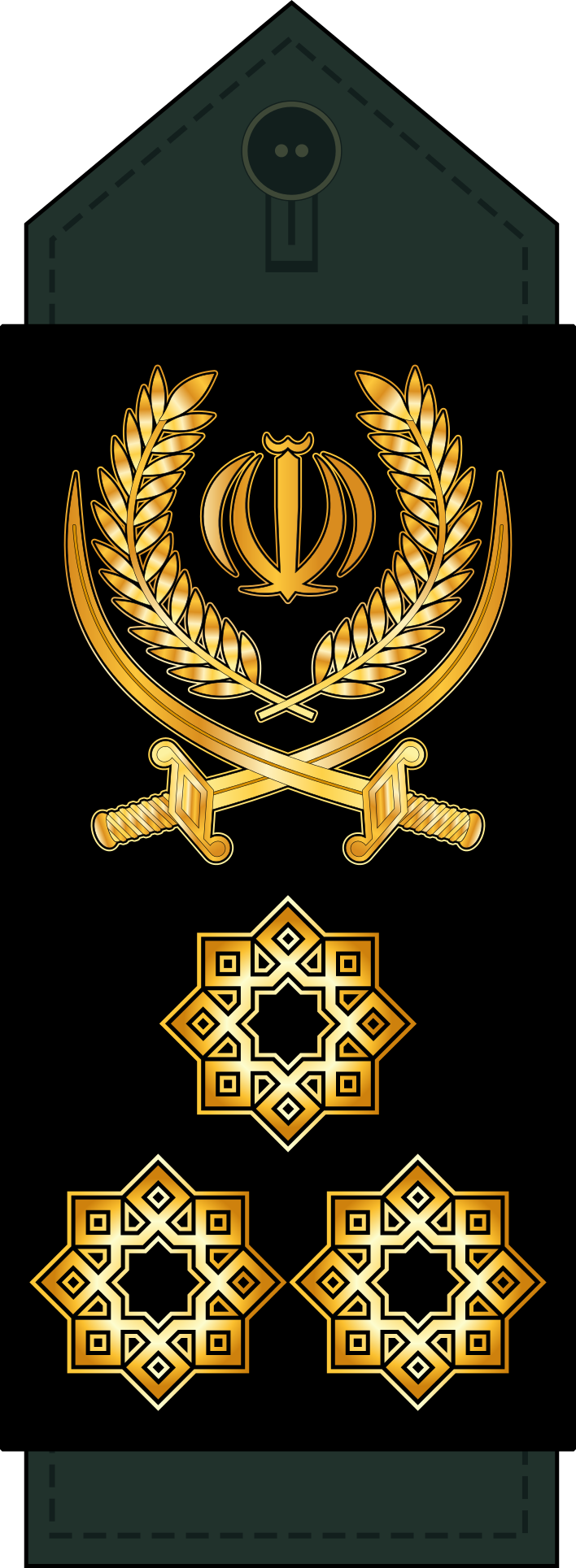
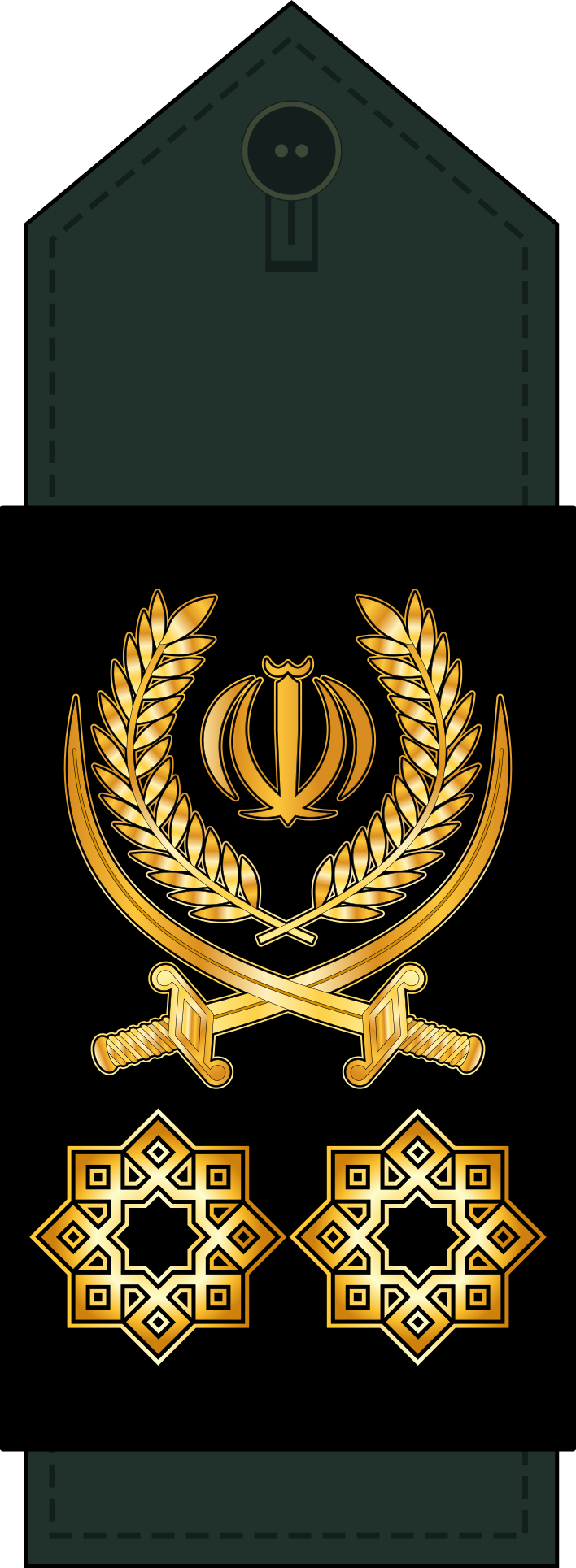
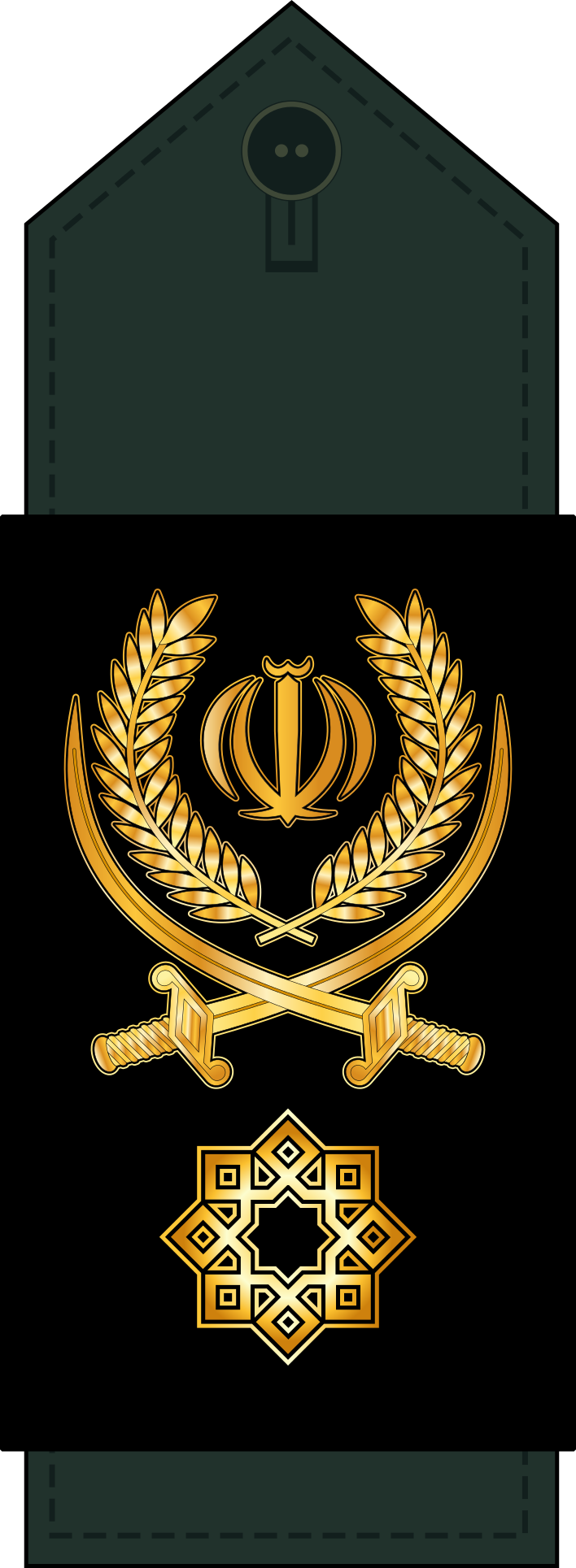
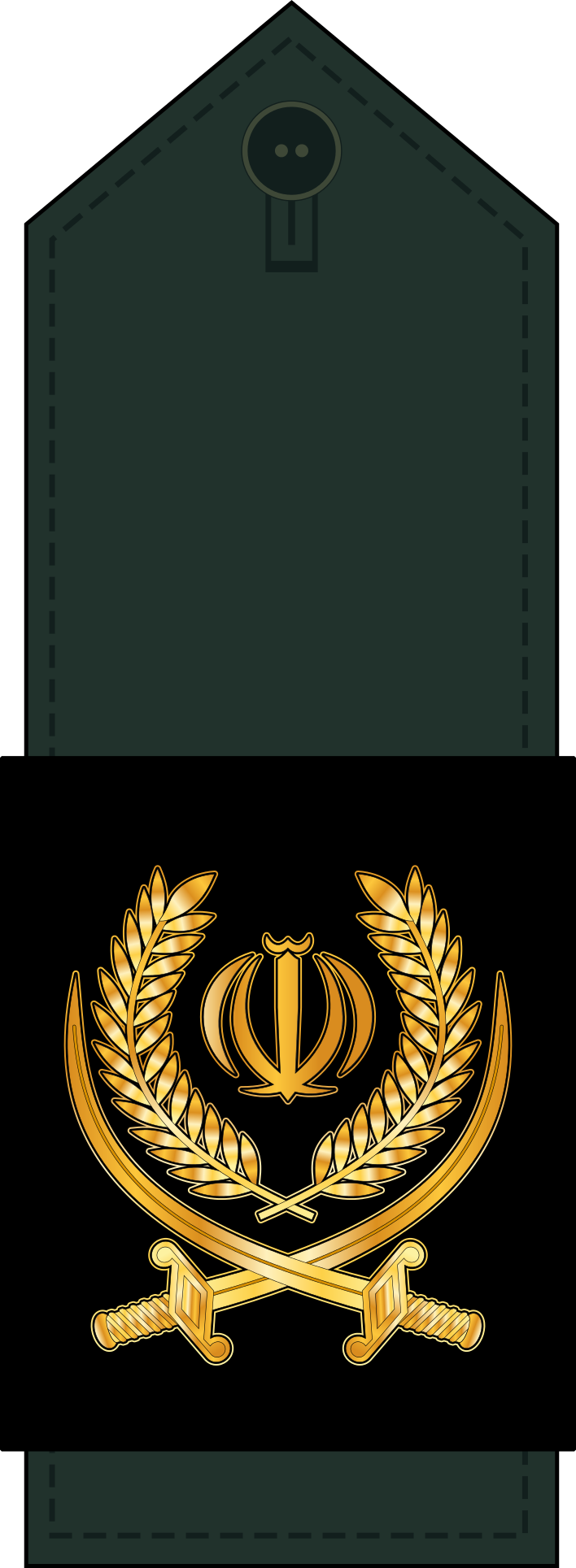
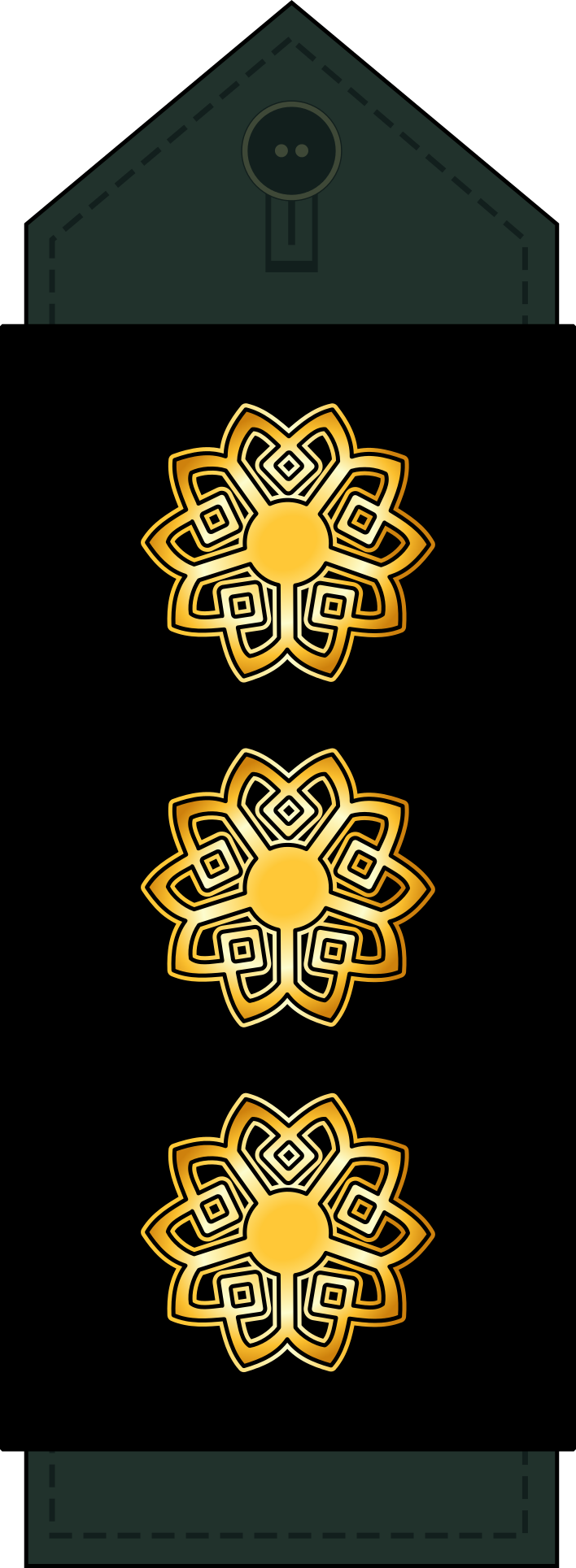
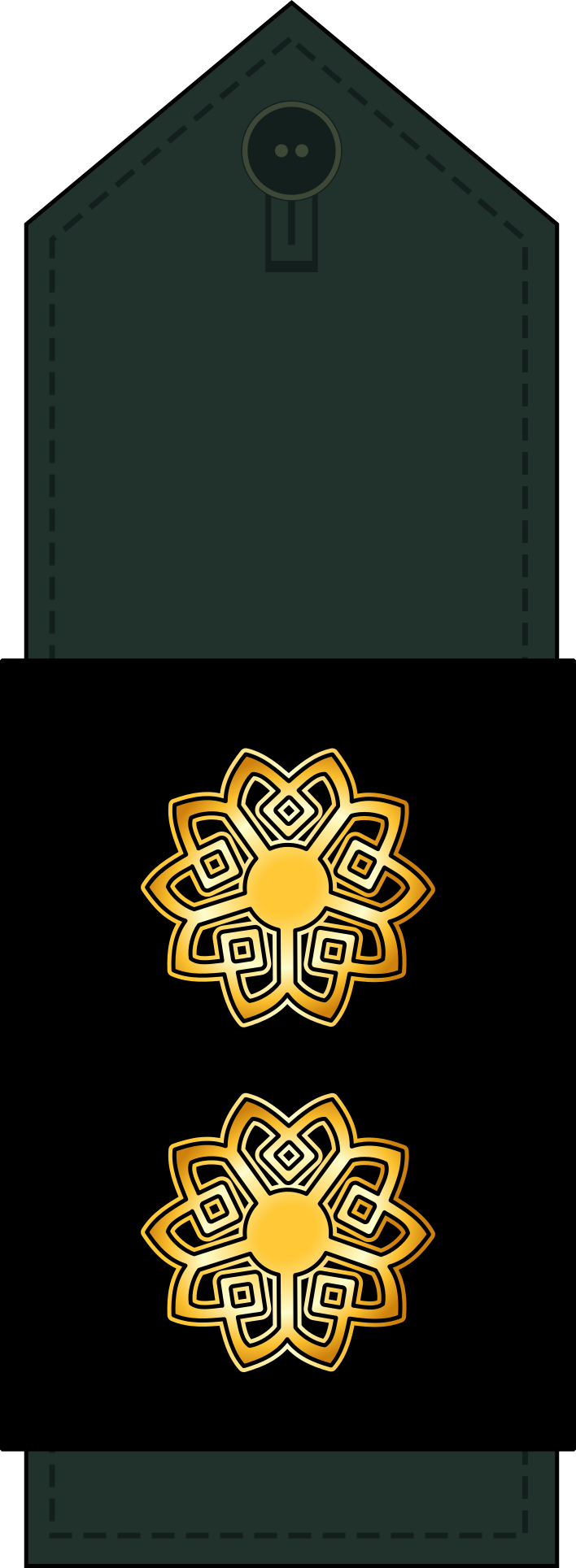
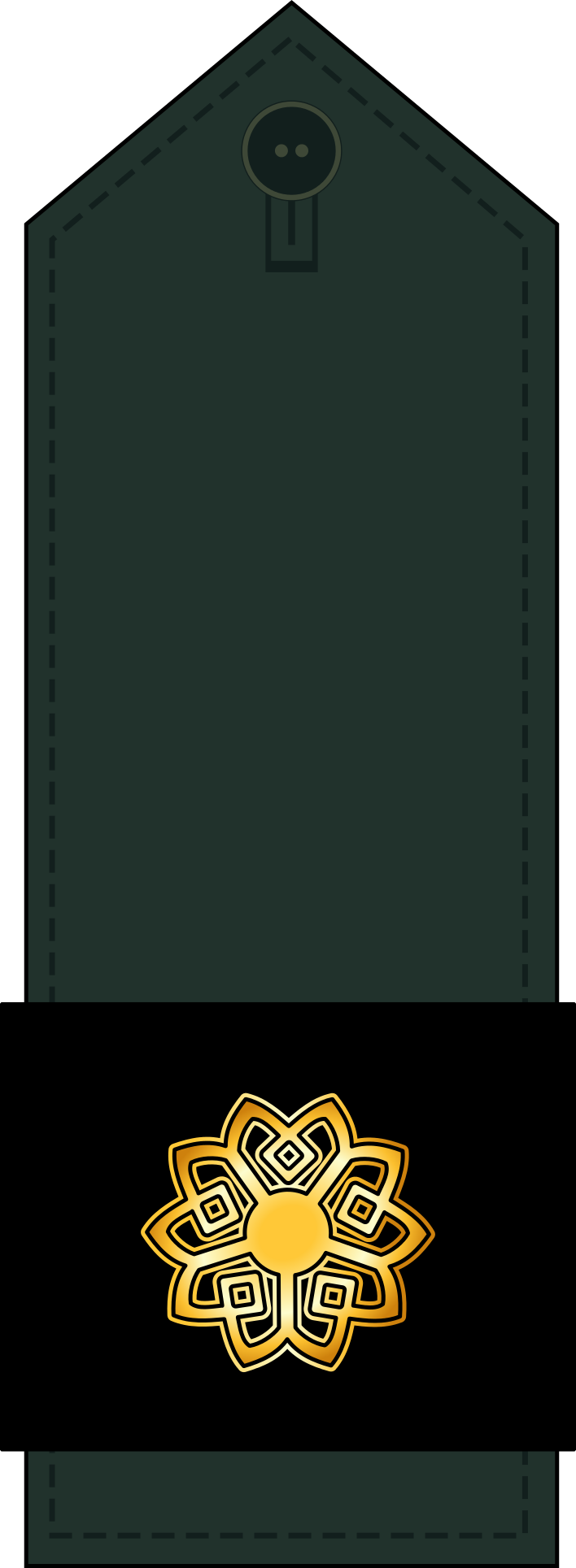
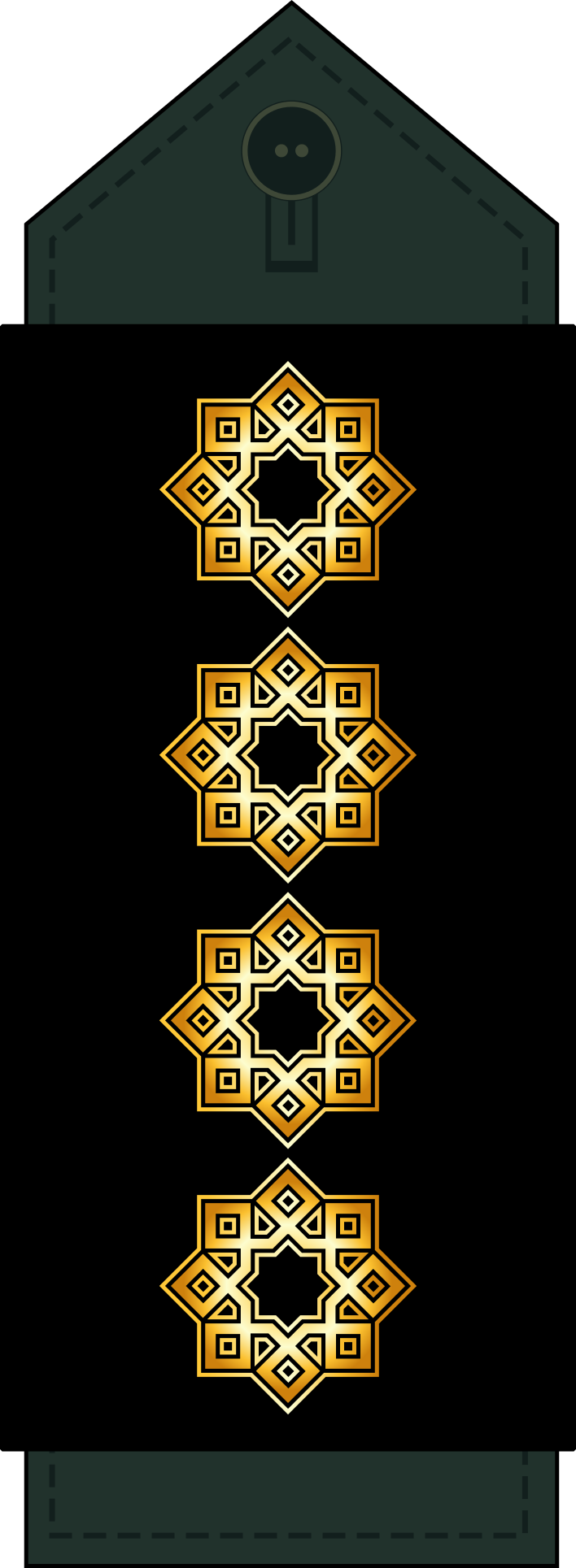
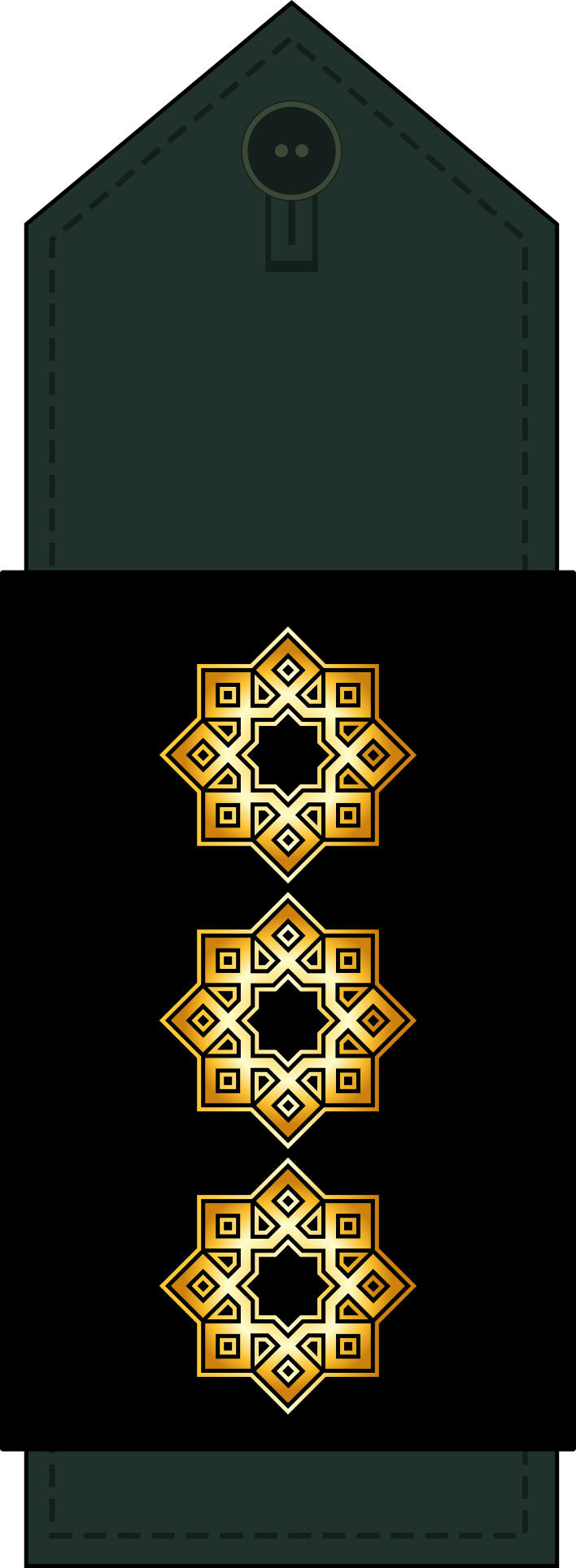
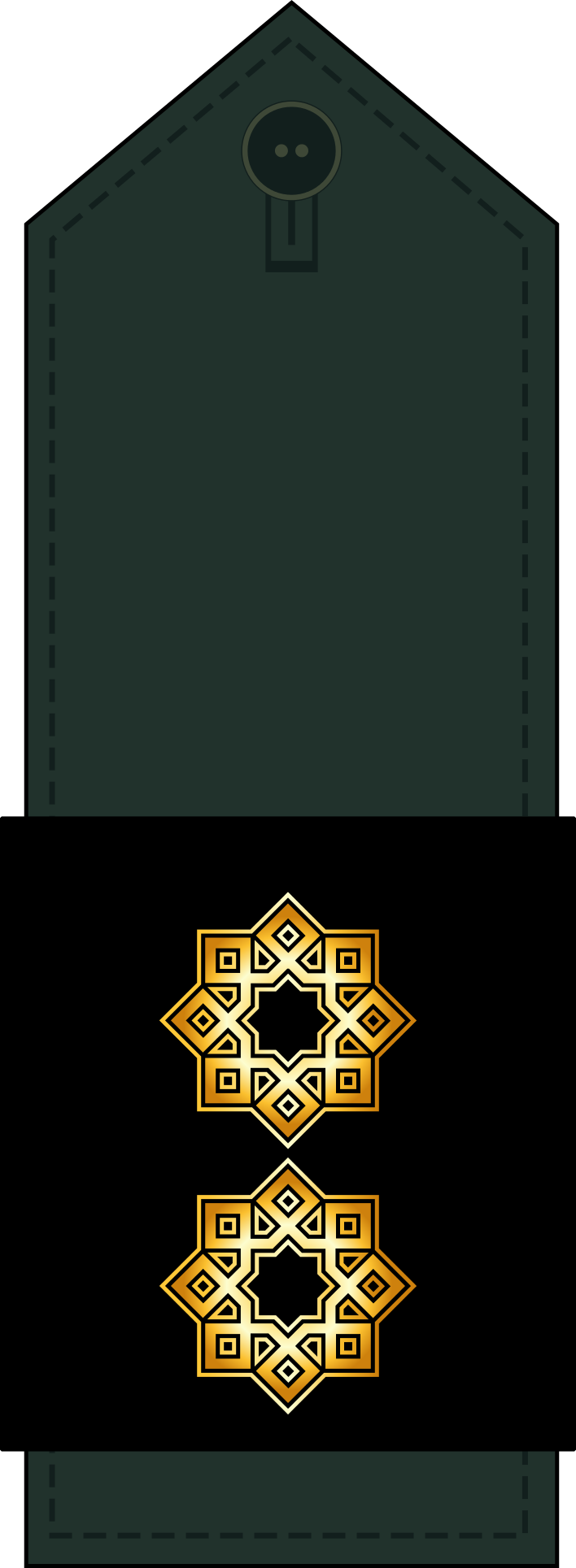
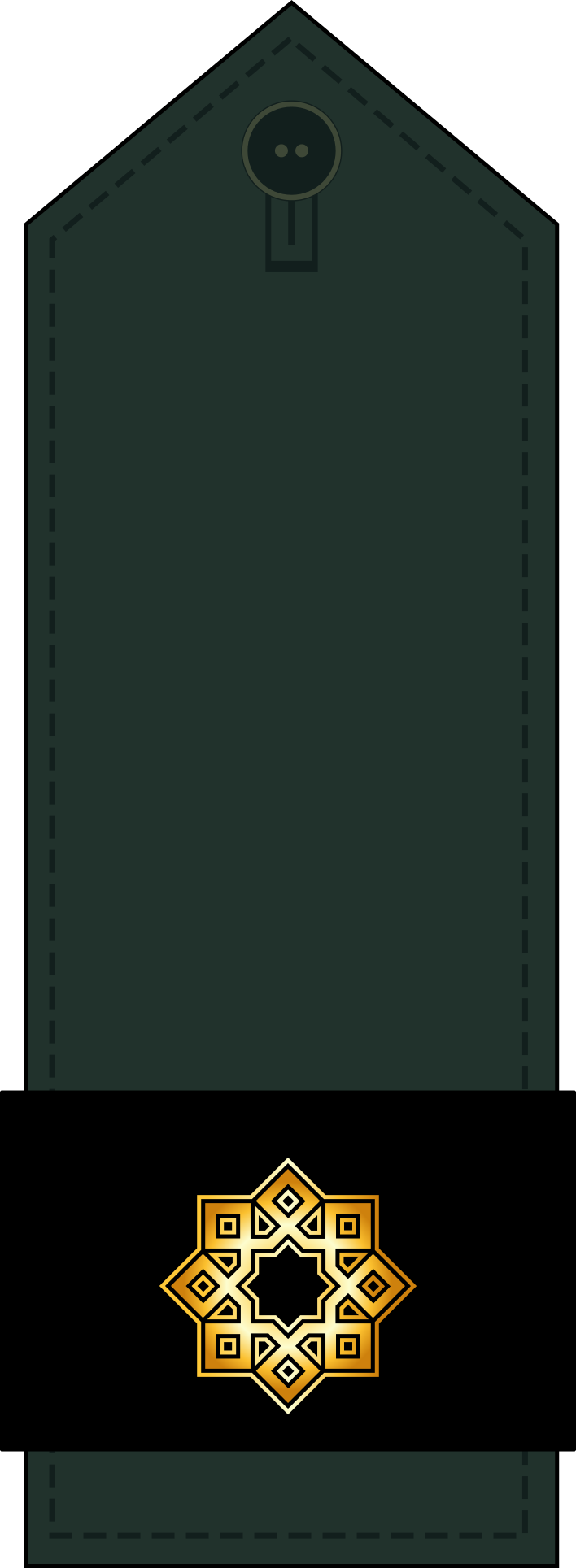
Rank group	General / flag officers					Senior officers			Junior officers
IRGC Ground Forces
IRGC Ground Forces	ارتشبد پاسدار; Arteshbod pasdar	سپهبد پاسدار; Sepahbod pasdar	سرلشکر پاسدار; Sarlashkar pasdar	سرتیپ پاسدار; Sartip pasdar	سرتیپ دوم پاسدار; Sartip dovom pasdar	سرهنگ پاسدار; Sarhang pasdar	سرهنگ دوم پاسدار; Sarhang dovom pasdar	سرگرد پاسدار; Sargord pasdar	سروان پاسدار; Sarwan pasdar	ستوان یکم پاسدار; Sotwan yekom pasdar	ستوان دوم پاسدار; Sotwan dovom pasdar	ستوان سوم پاسدار; Sotwan sevom pasdar

Enlisted

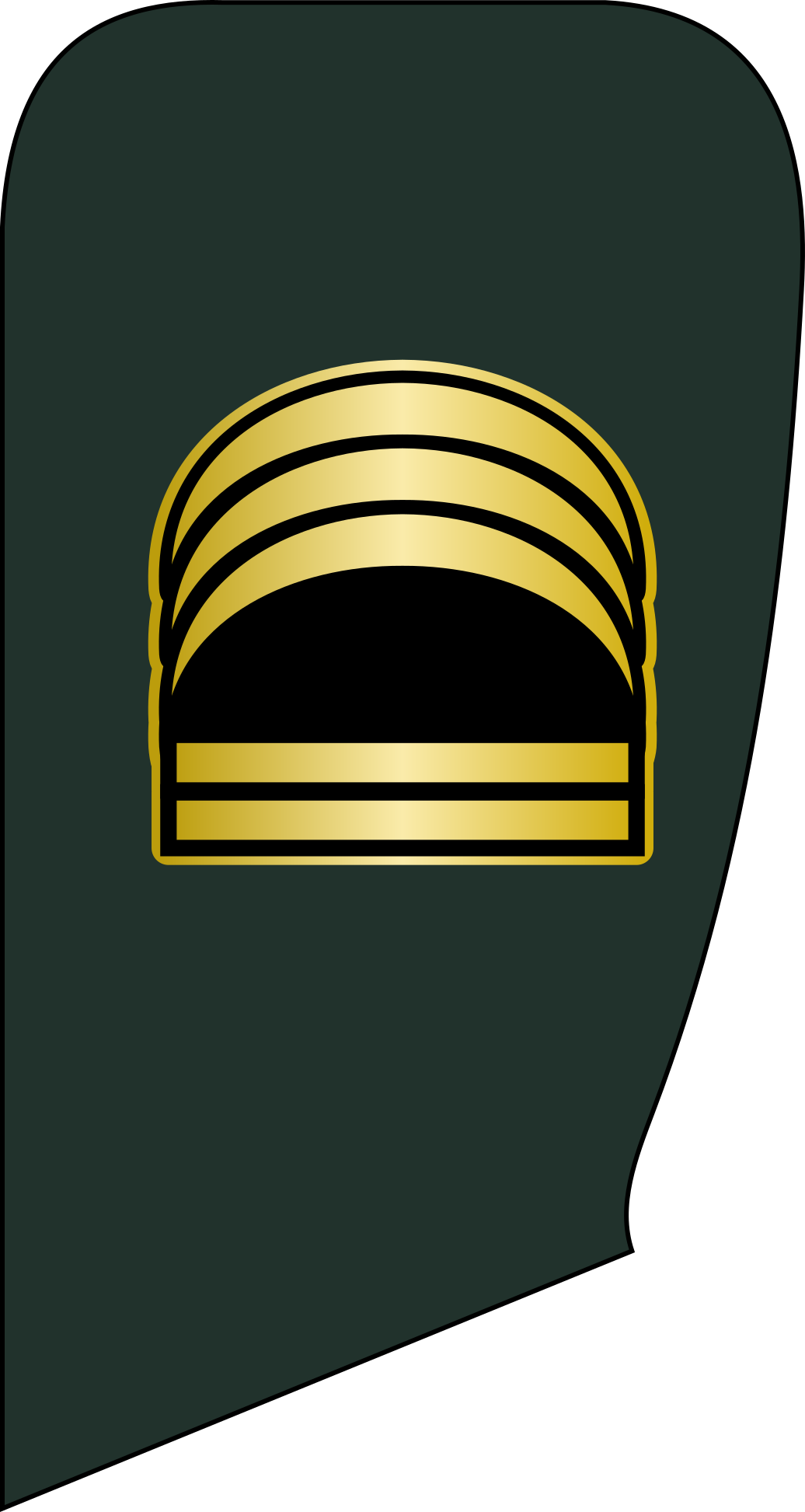
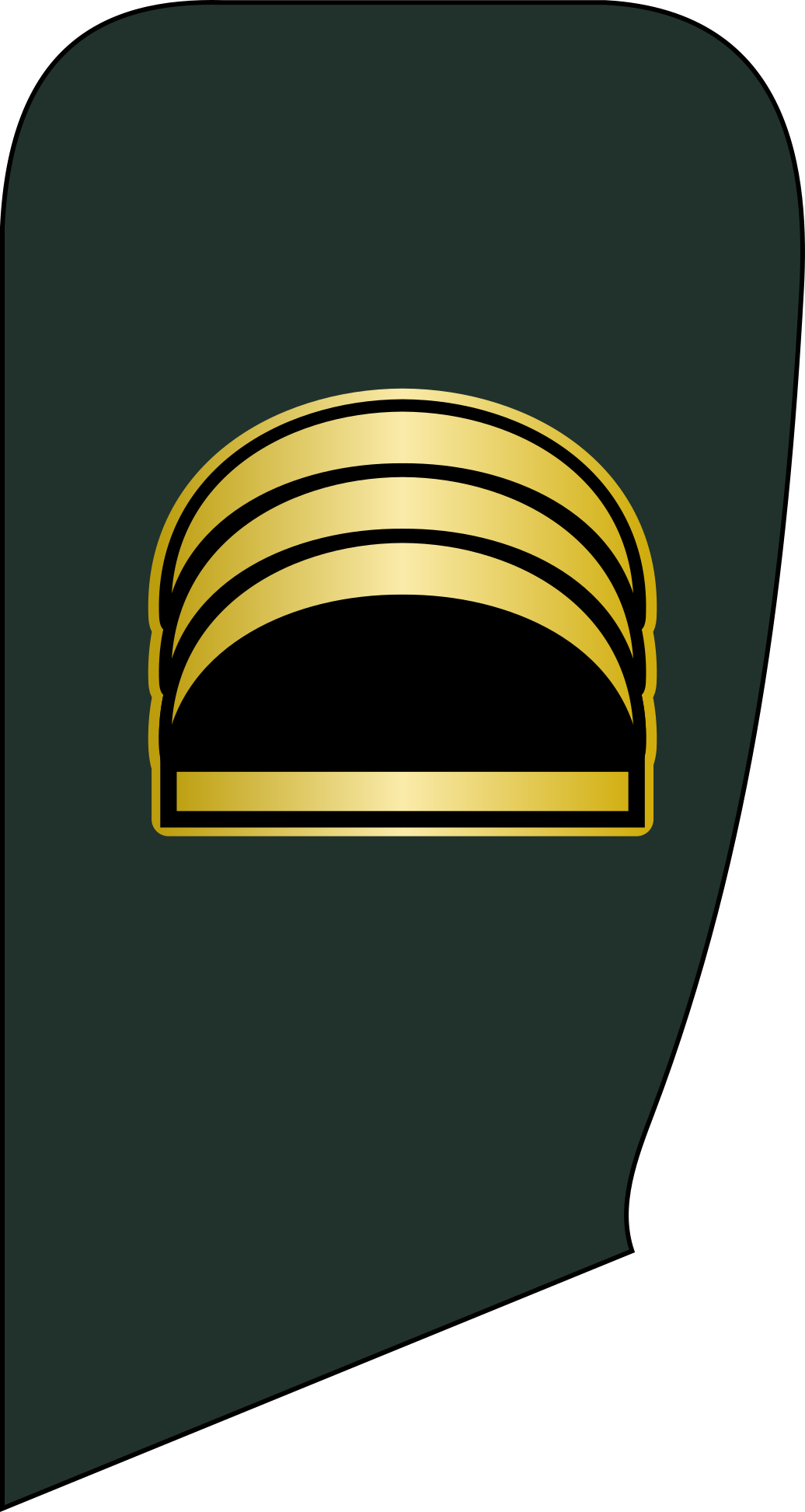
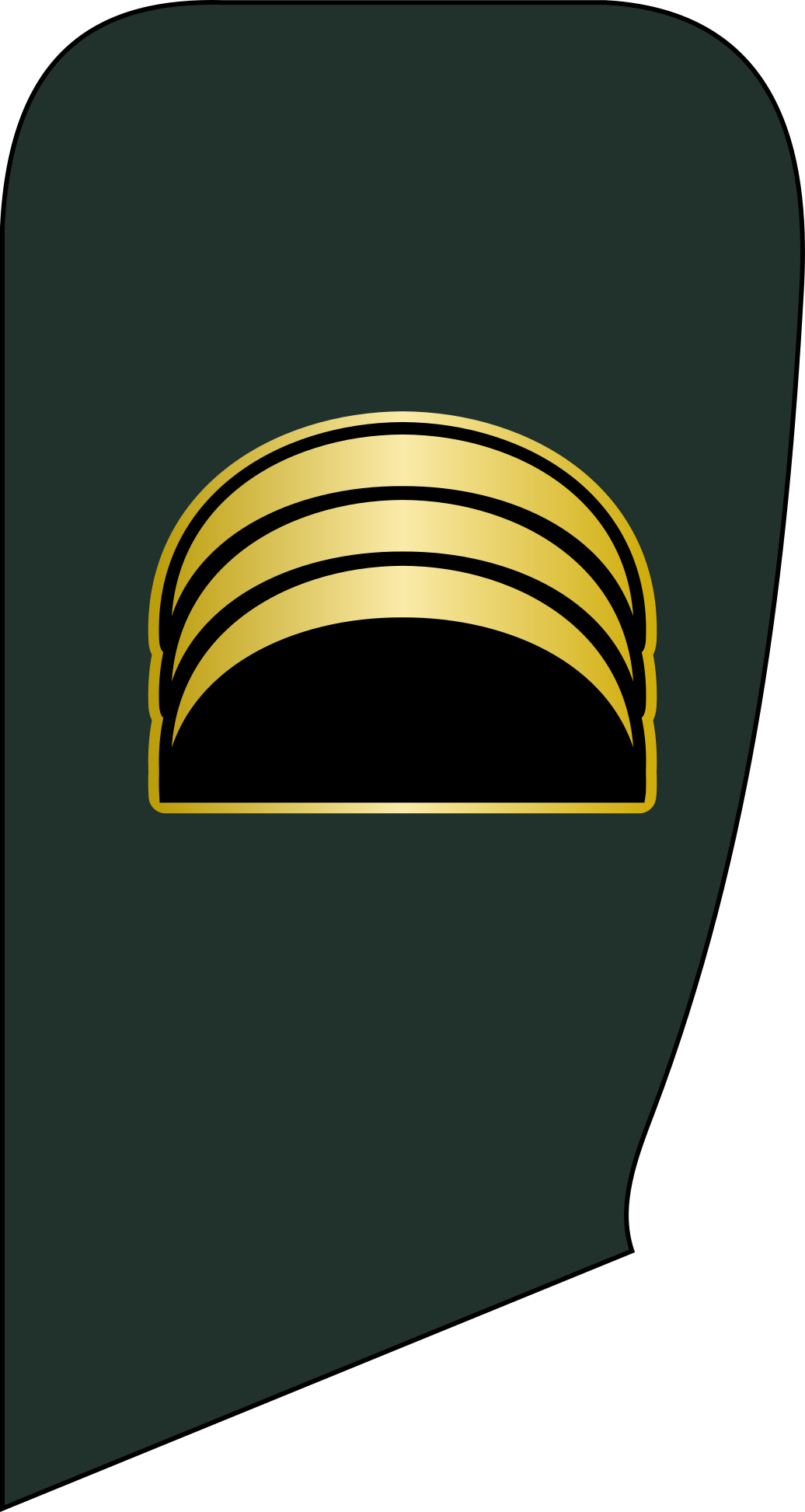
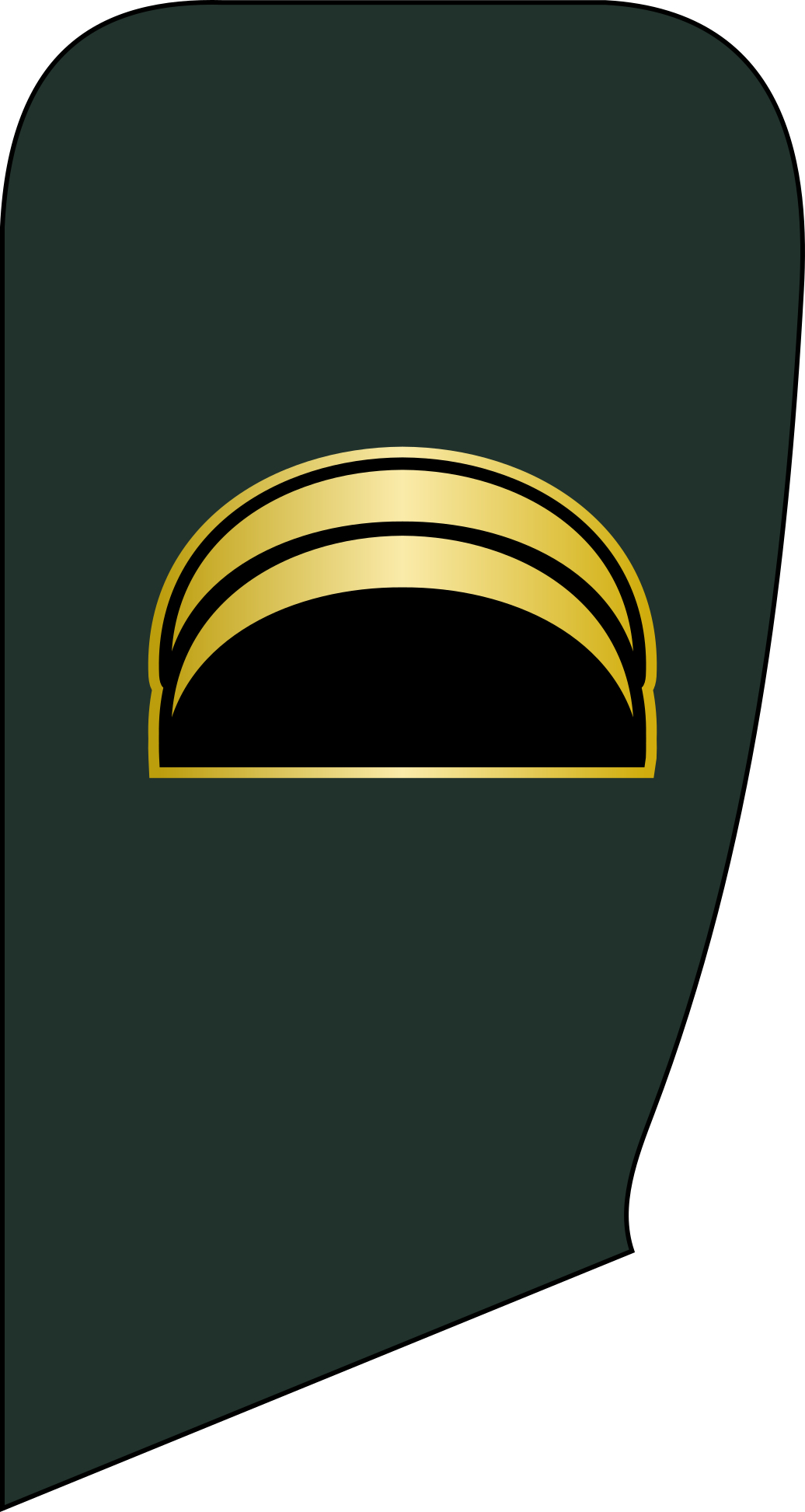
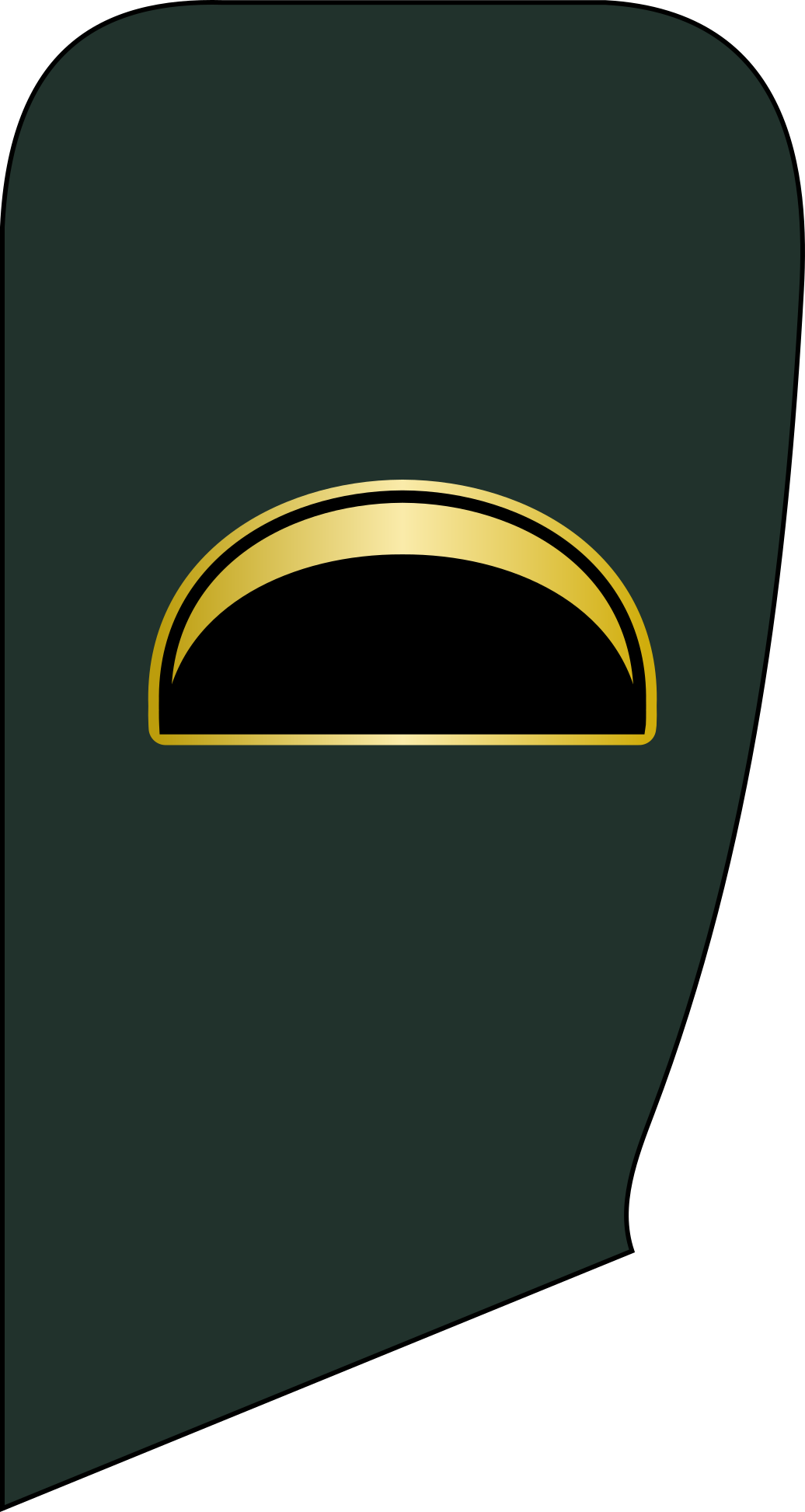
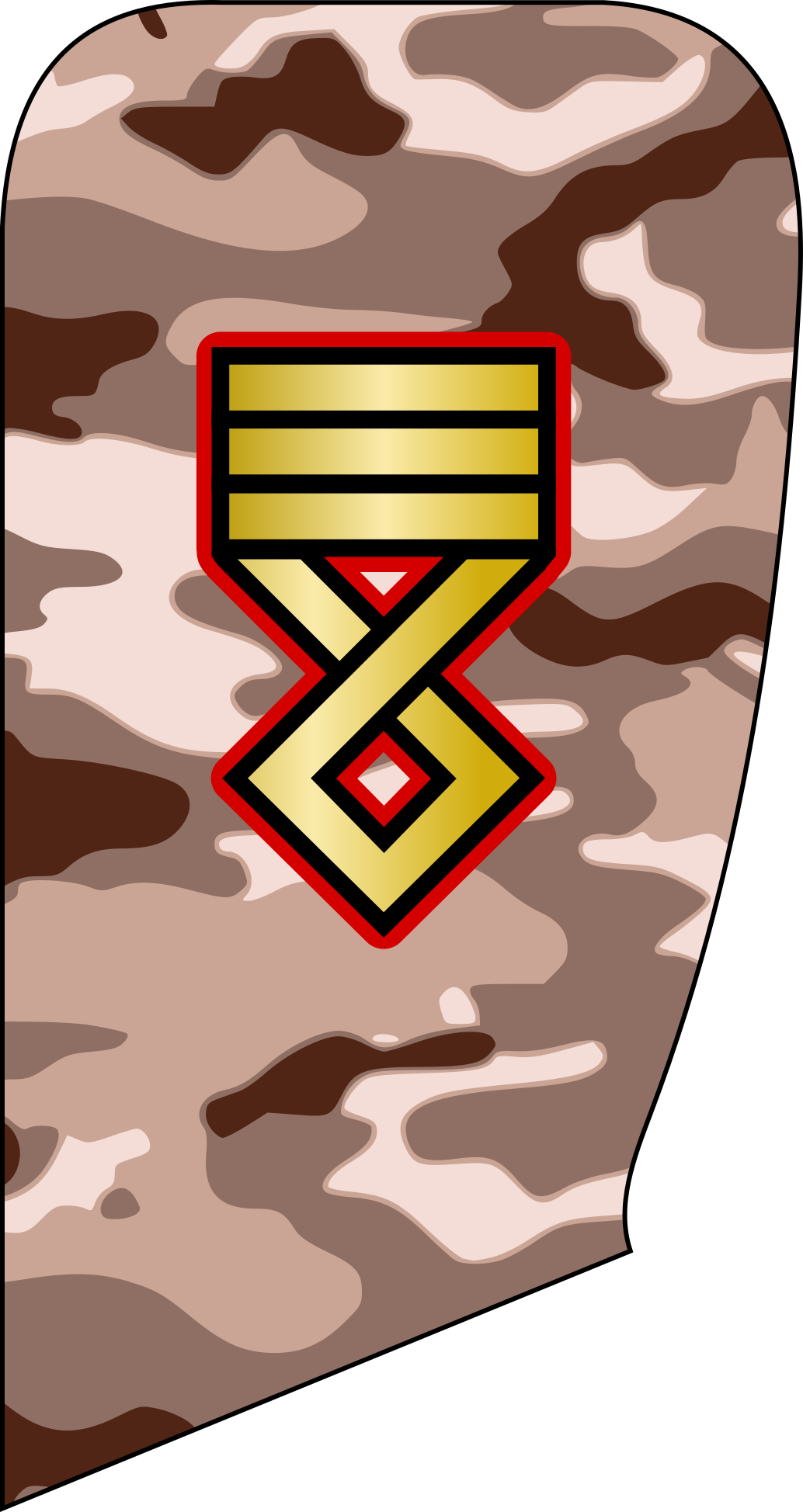
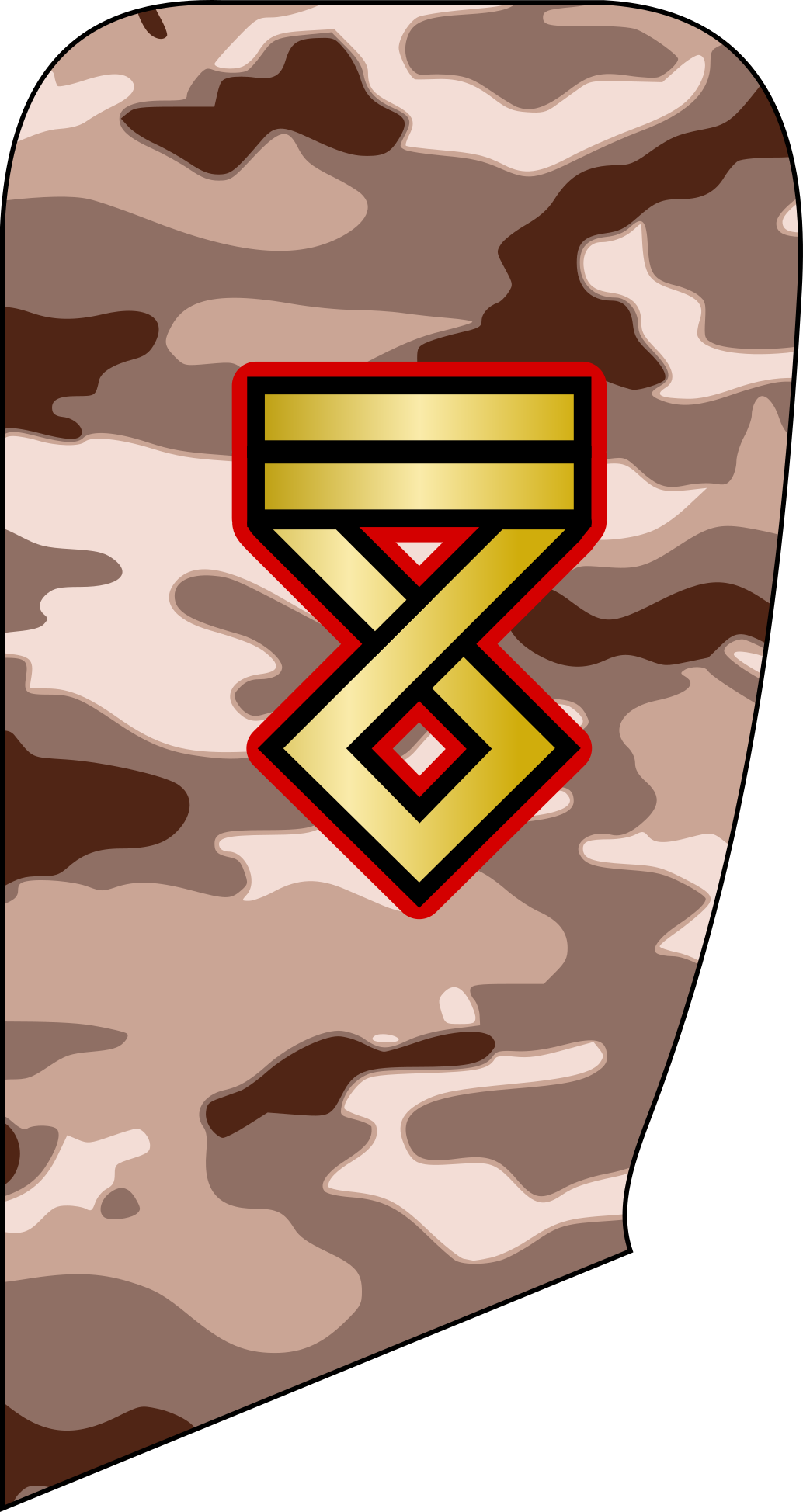
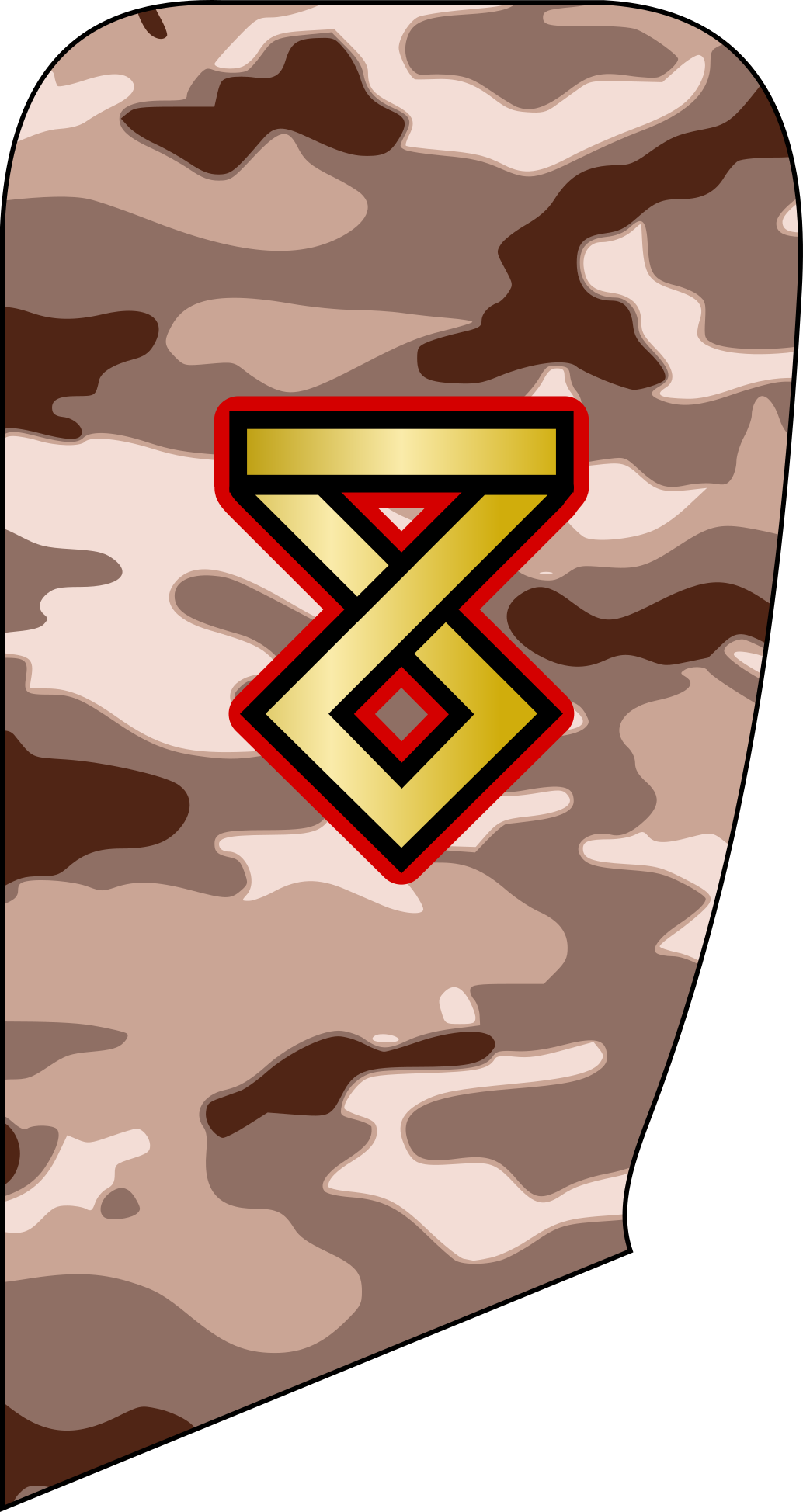
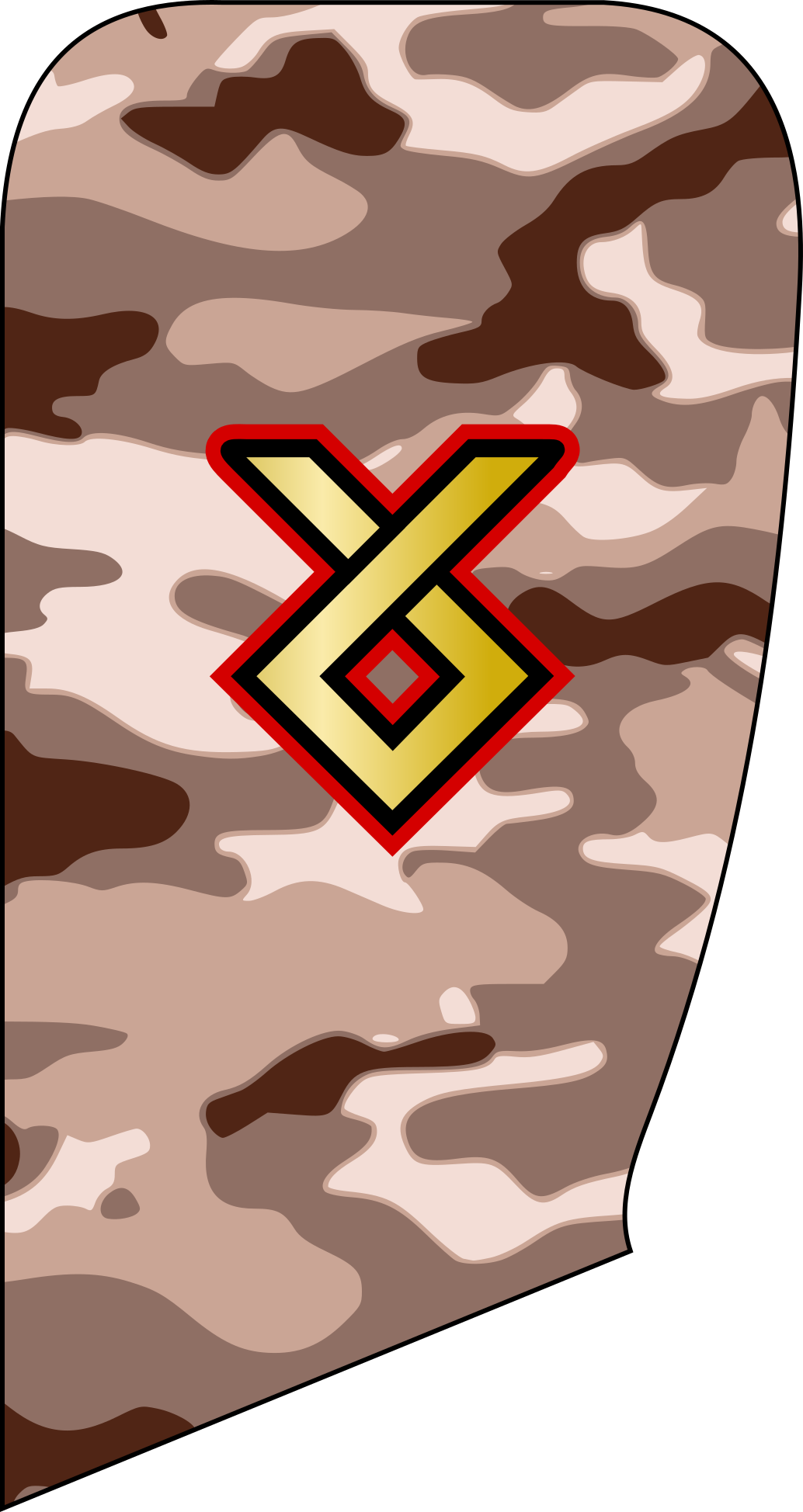
Rank group	Senior NCOs					Junior NCOs		Enlisted
IRGC Ground Forces
IRGC Ground Forces	رزم‌دار یکم; Razmdar yekom pasdar	رزم‌دار دوم; Razmdar dovom pasdar	رزم‌آور یکم; Razmavar yekom pasdar	رزم‌آور دوم; Razmavar dovom pasdar	رزم‌آور سوم; Razmavar sevom pasdar	رزم‌یار; Razmyar pasdar	سرباز یکم; Sarbaz yekom pasdar	سرباز دوم; Sarbaz dovom pasdar	سرباز; Sarbaz pasdar

== See also ==
- Military insignia
- Military ranks of Iran
