= Military ranks of Imperial Iran =

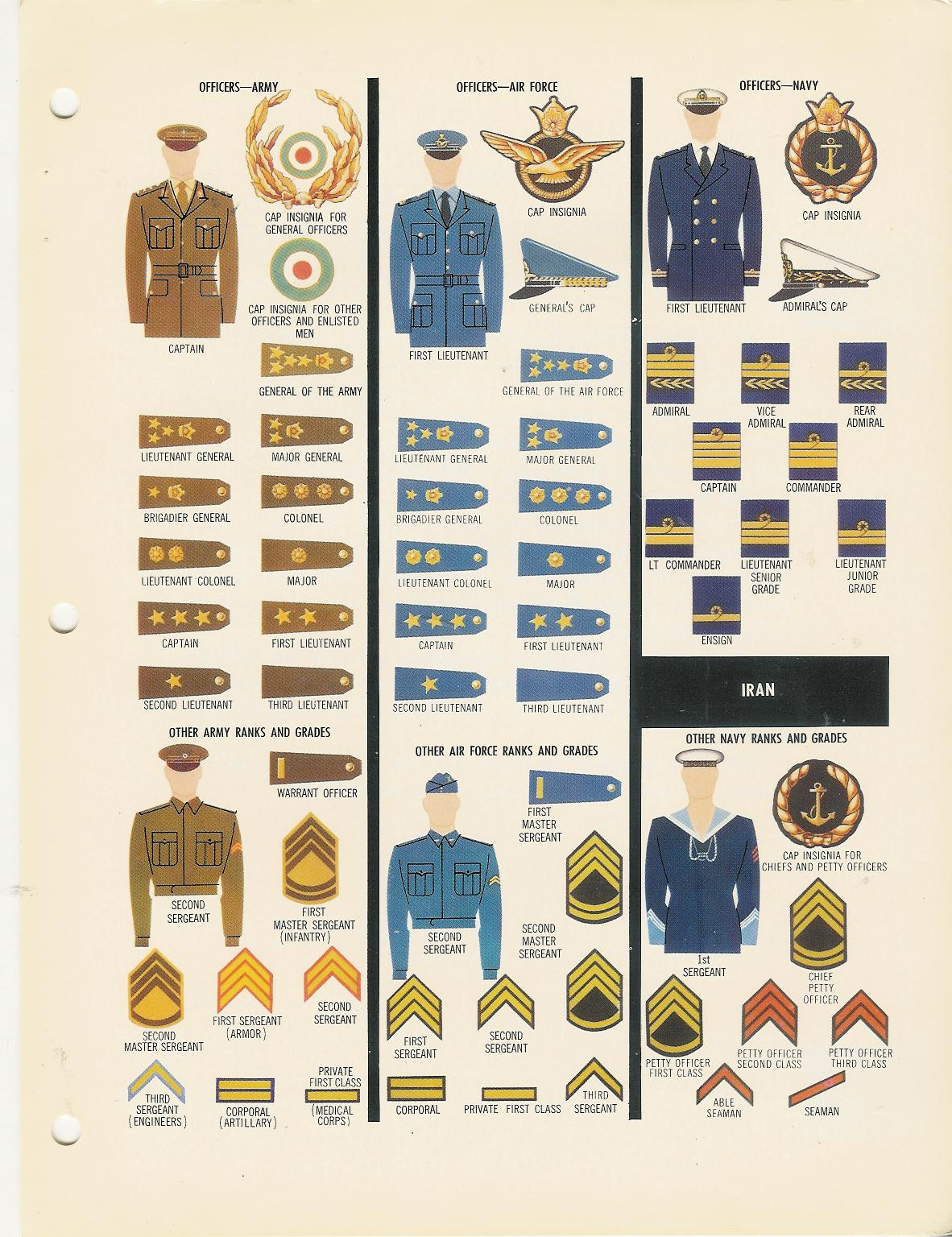
Imperial ranks

The military ranks of Imperial Iran are the military insignia used by the Military of Imperial Iran.

== Commander-in-chief insignia ==
Branch	Army	Navy	Air force
Insignia			
Persian	آریابد		
Romanization	Aryabod		
Literal translation	Chief/Guardian of the Aryans		

== Commissioned officer ranks ==
The rank insignia of commissioned officers.

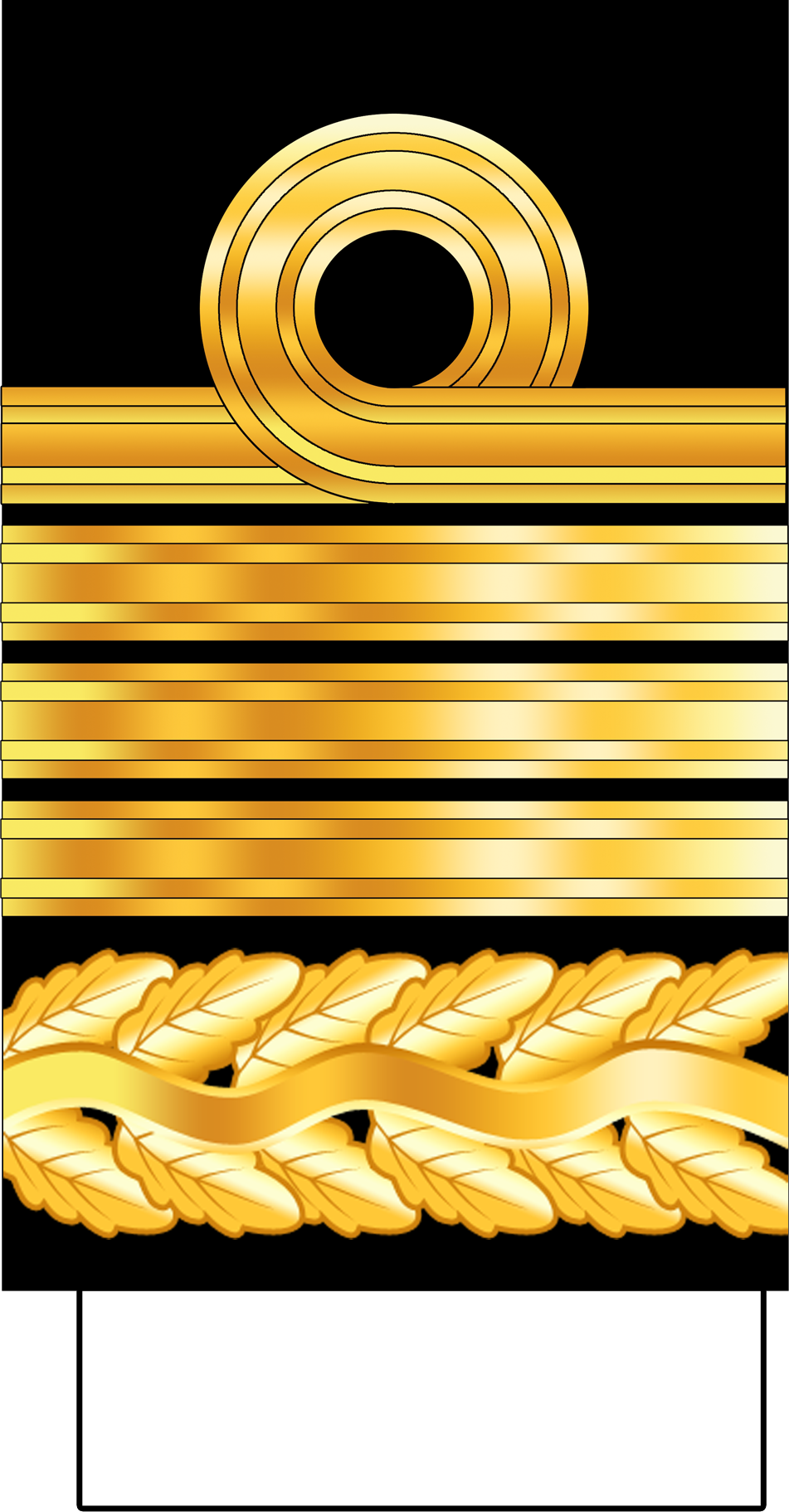
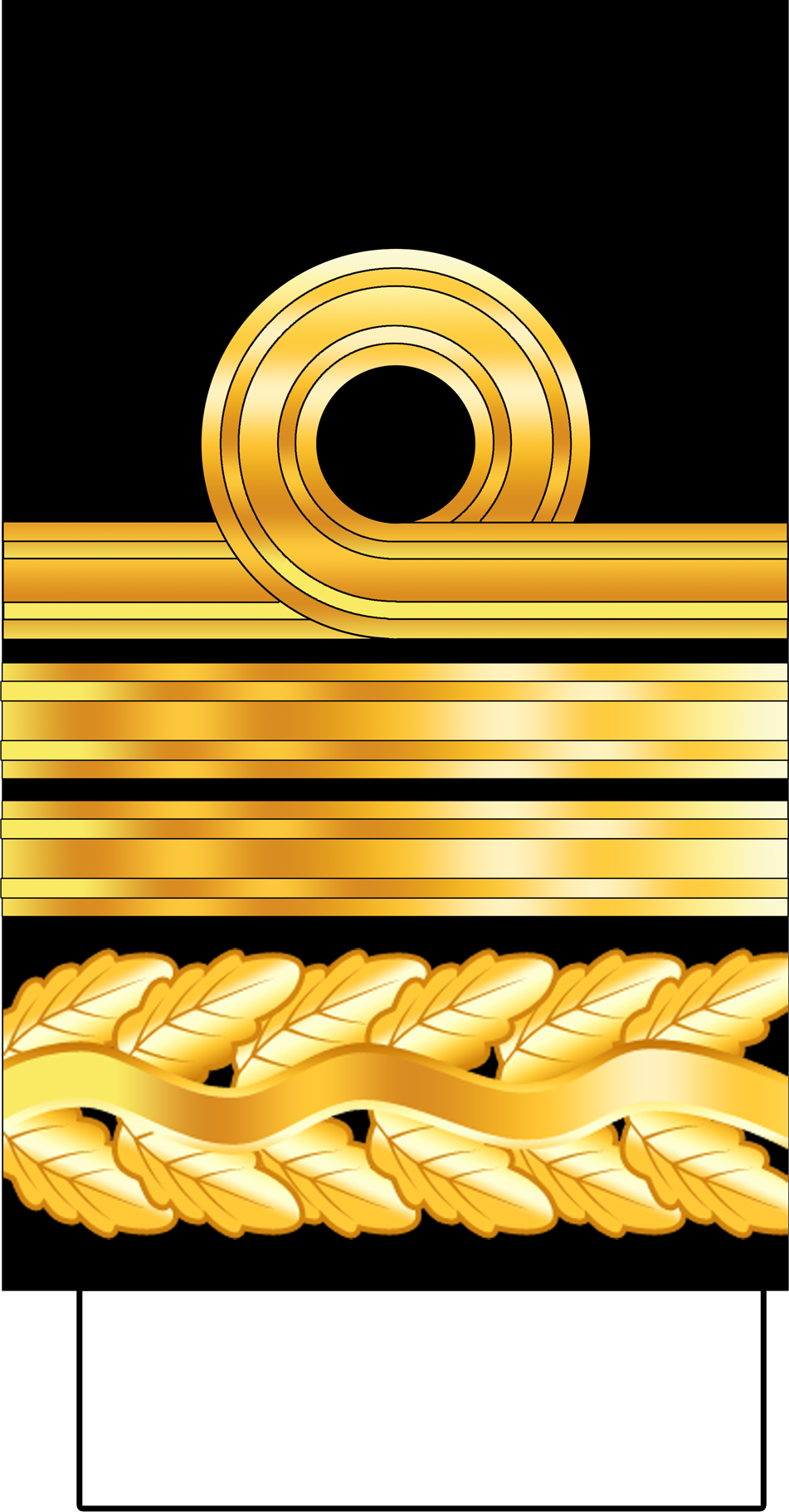
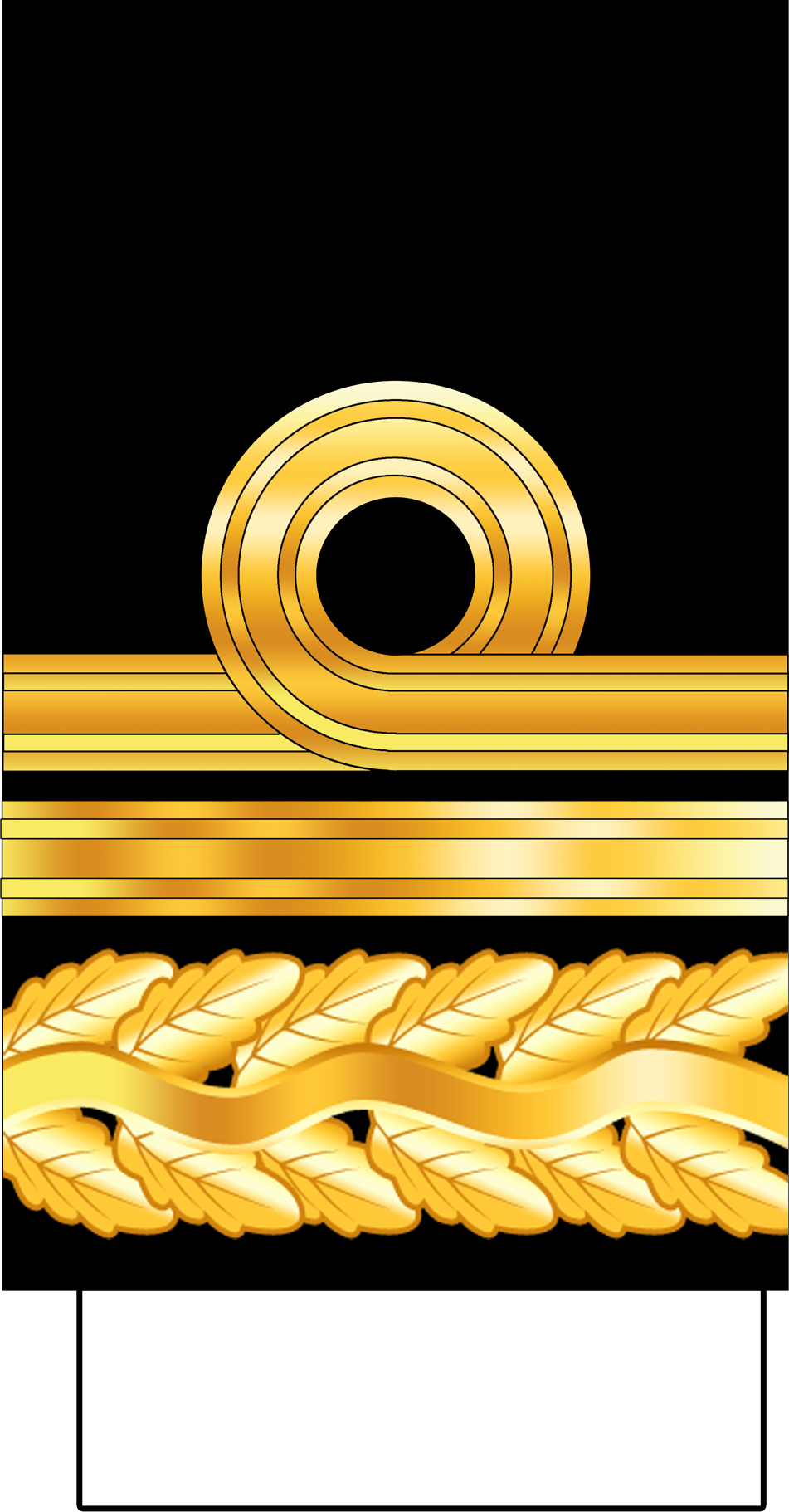
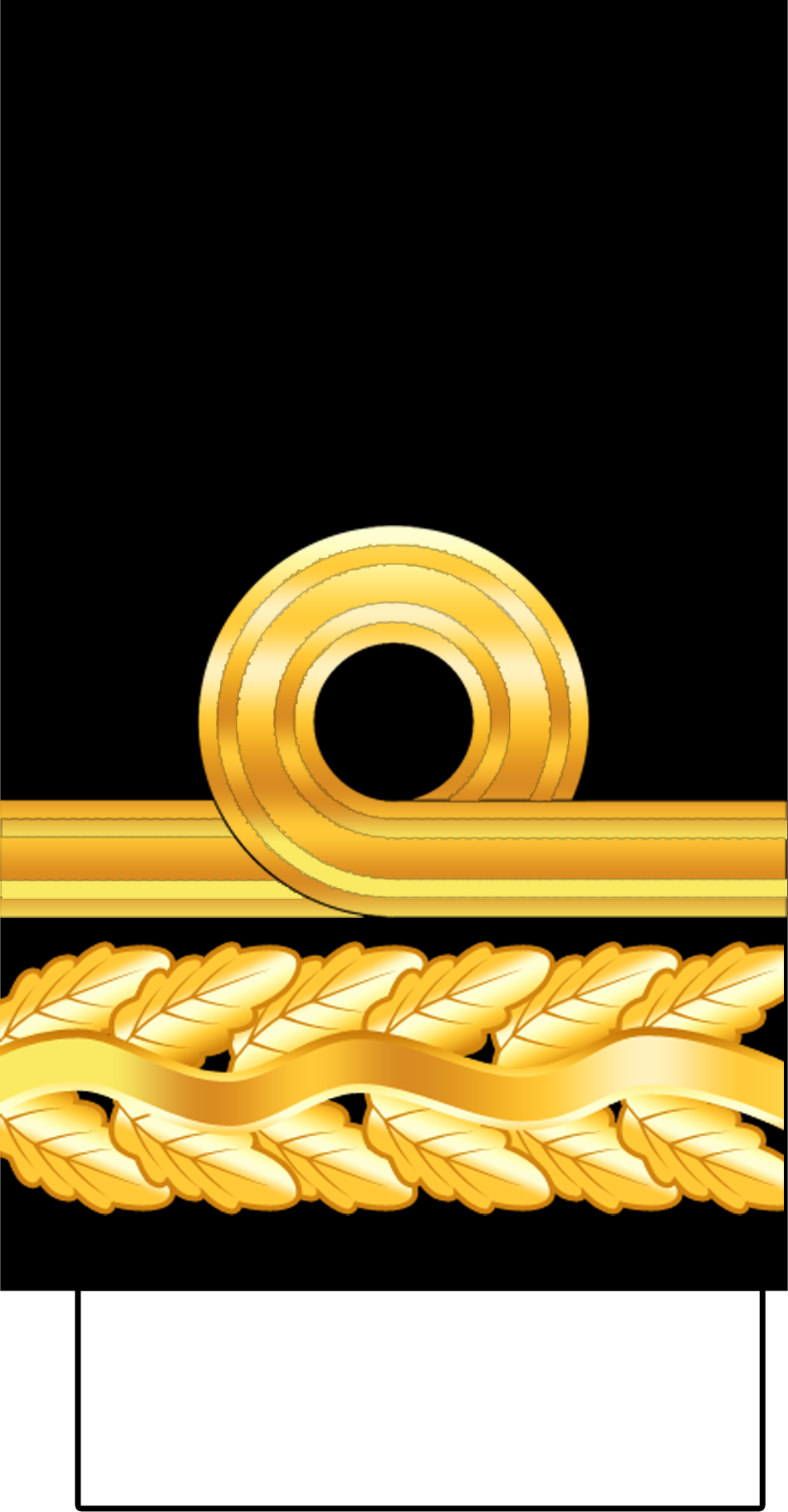
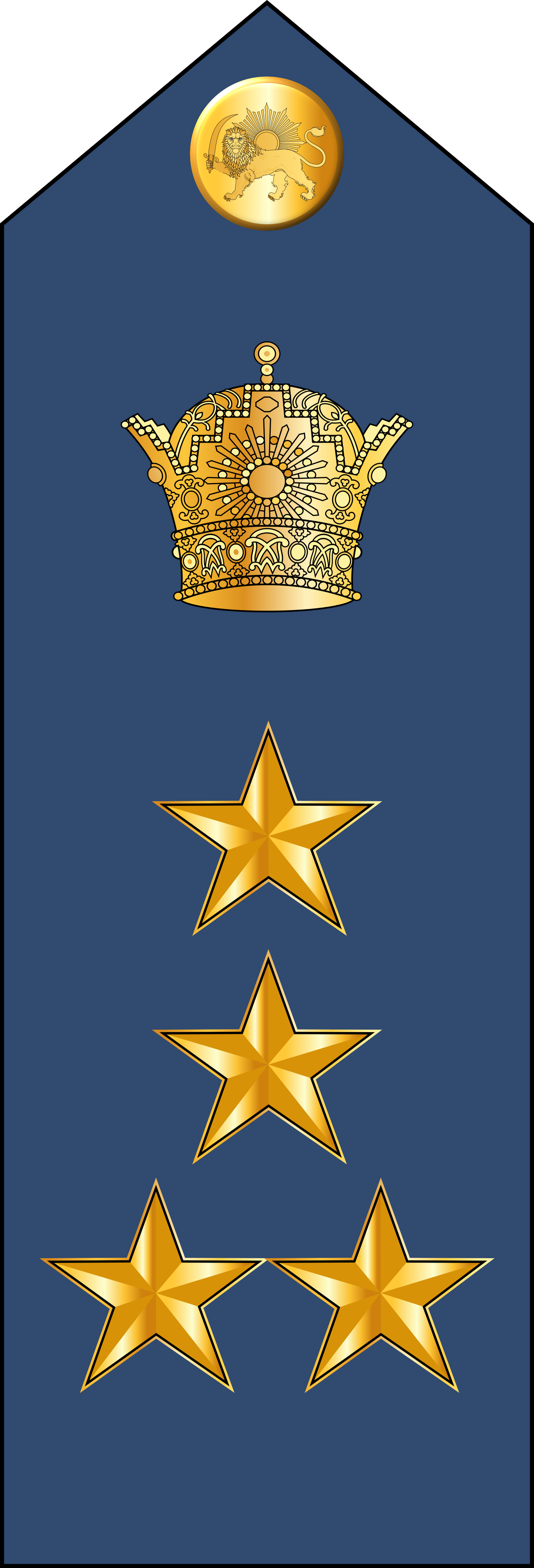
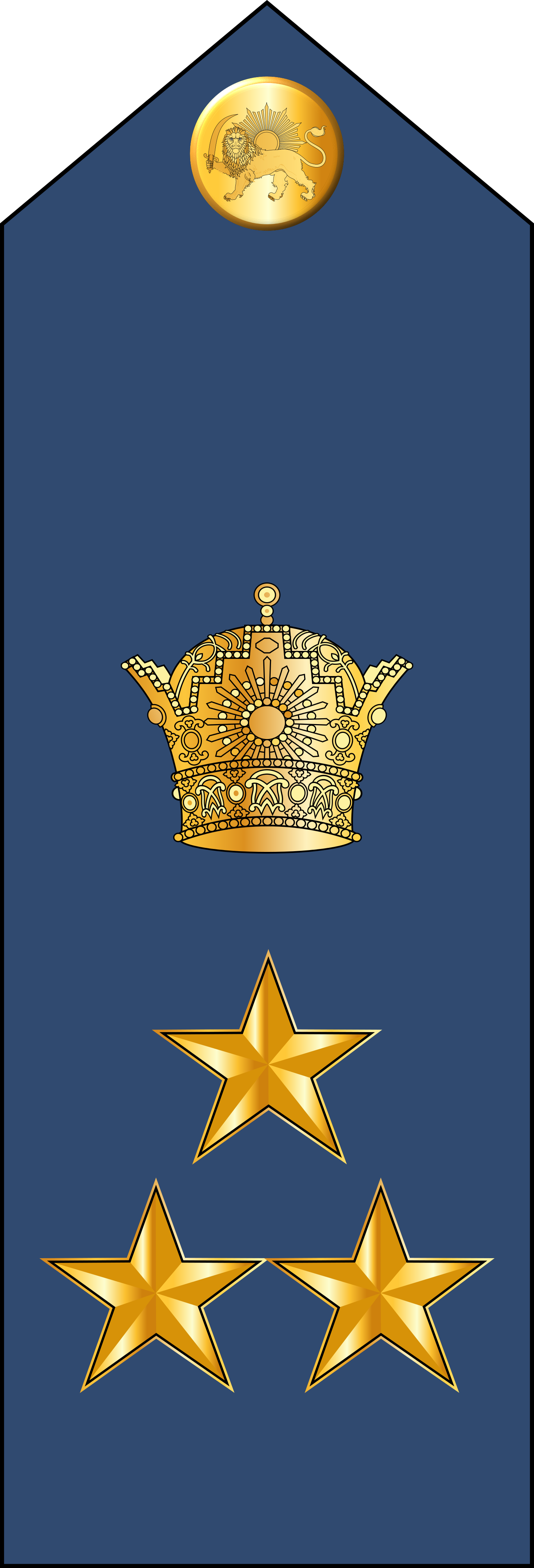
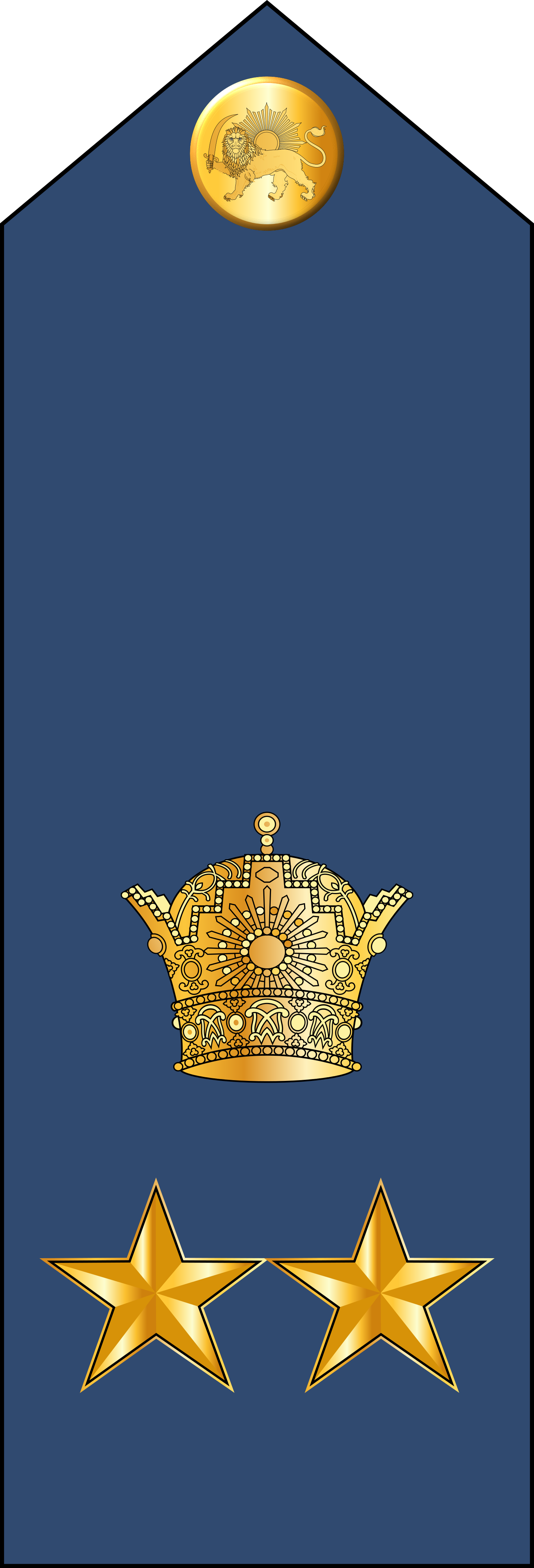
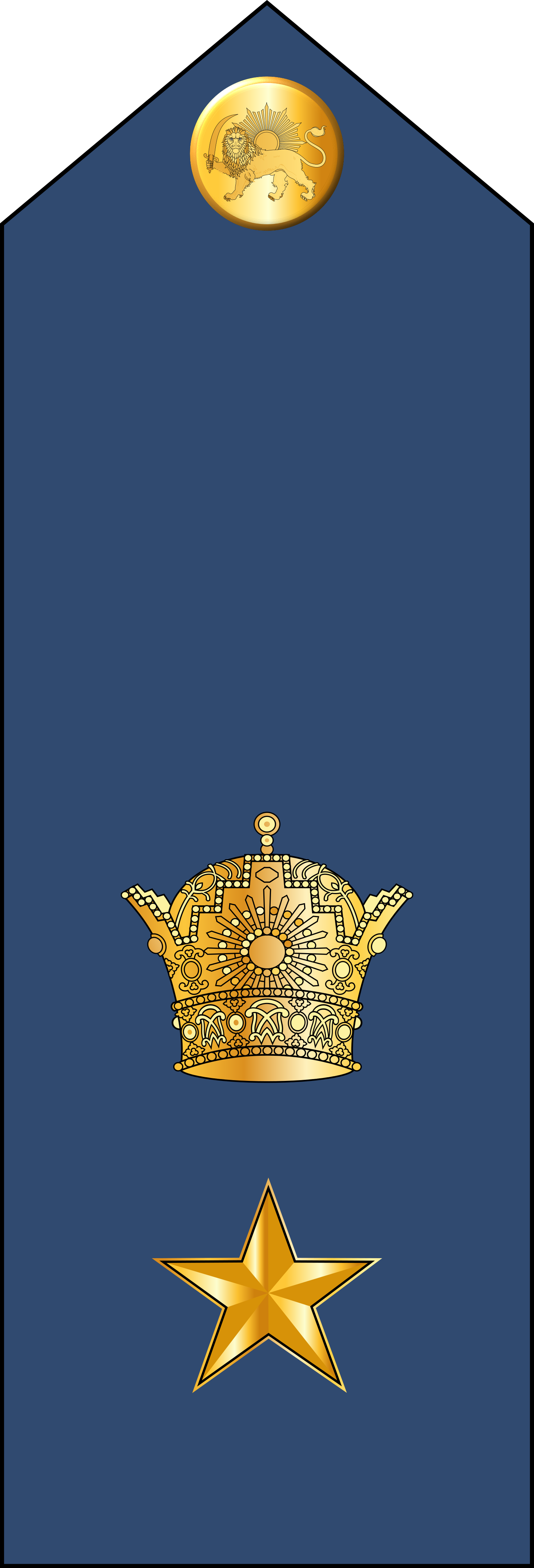
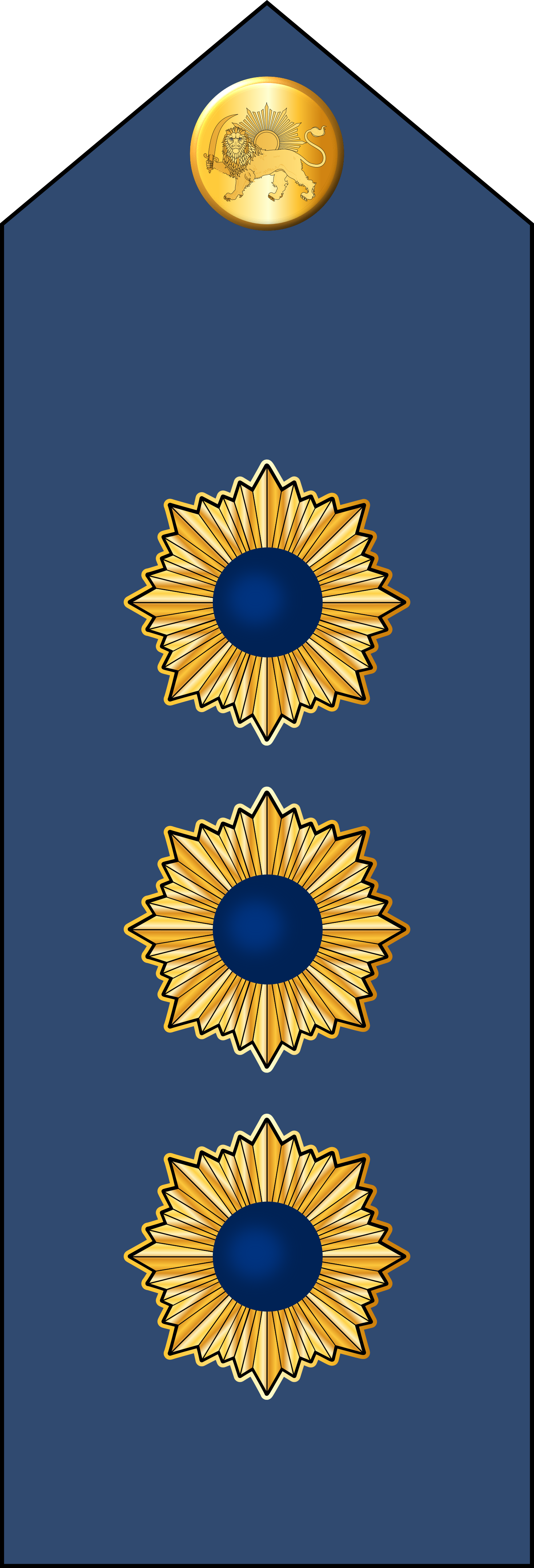
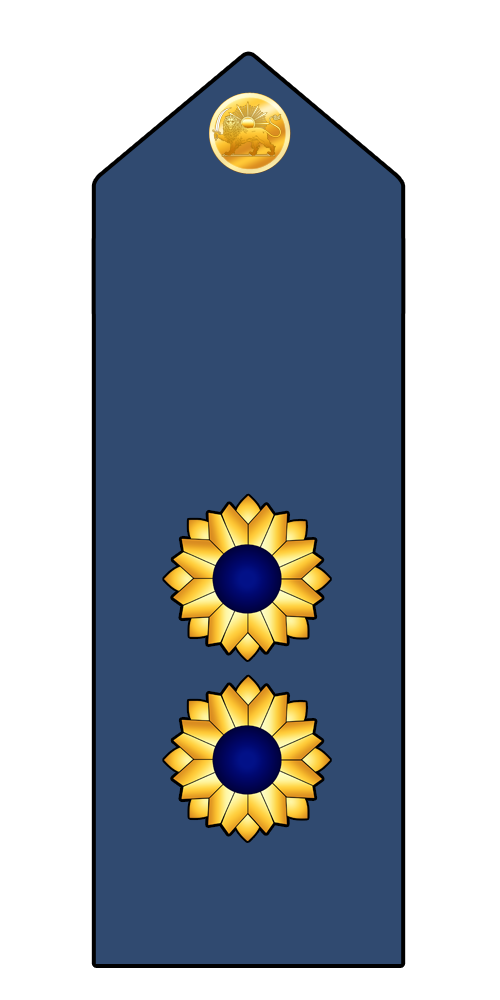
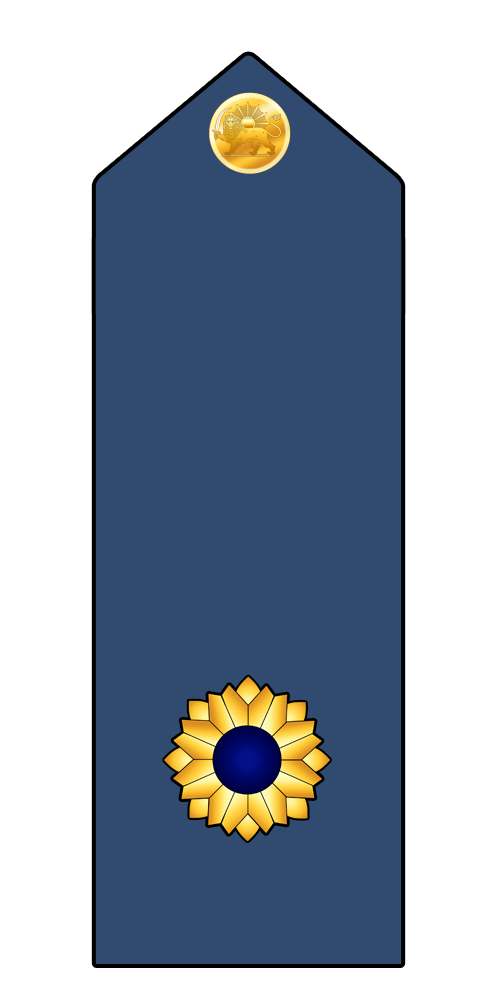
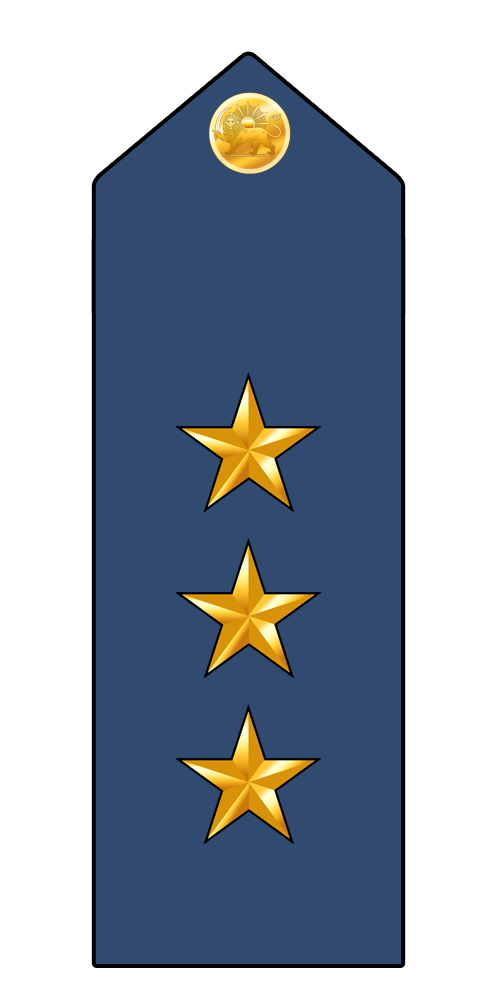
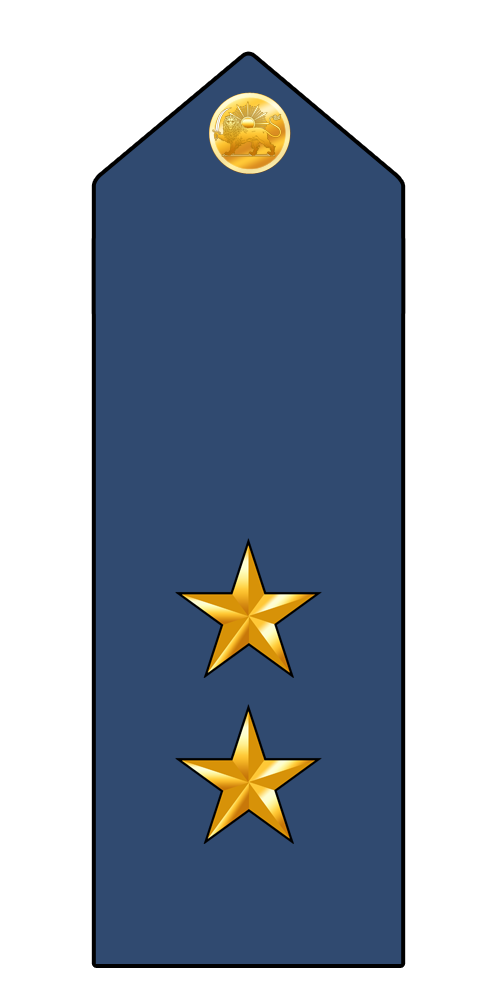
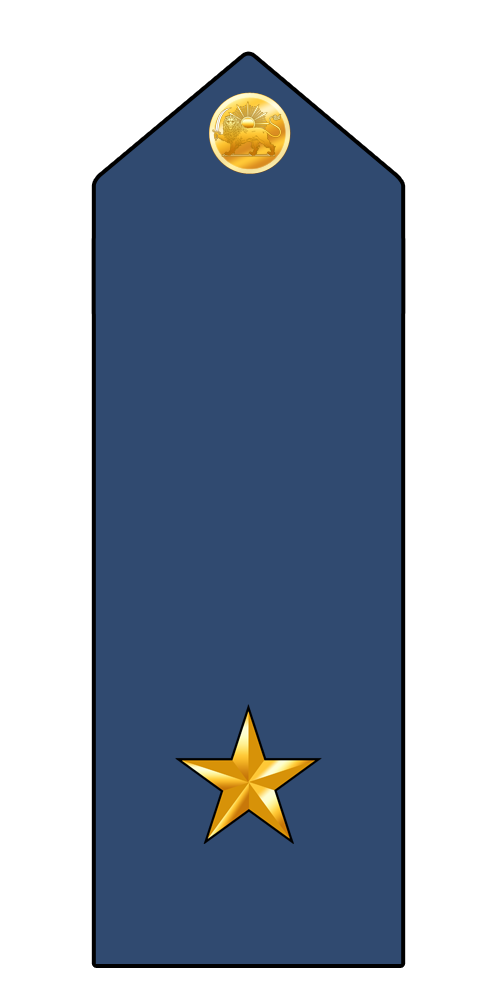
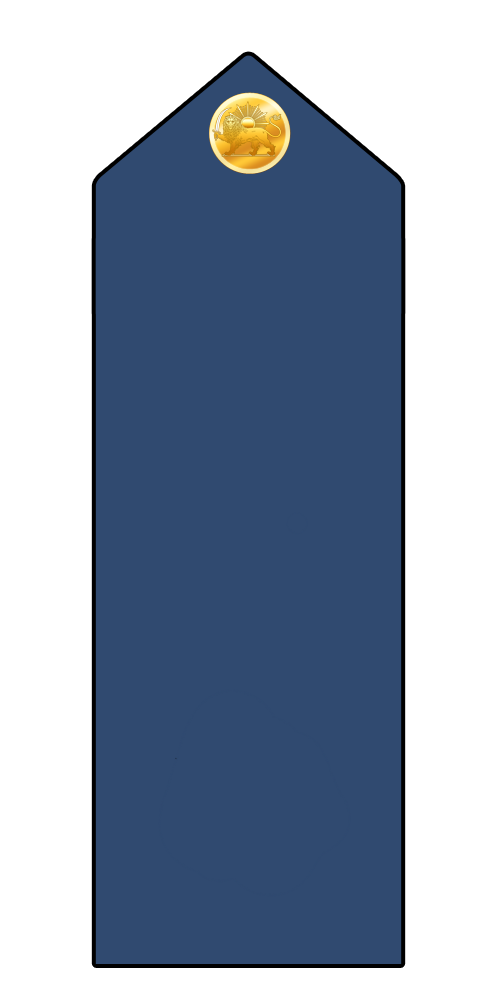
Rank group	General / flag officers				Senior officers			Junior officers
Imperial Iranian Ground Force
Imperial Iranian Ground Force	ارتشبد; Arteshbod	سپهبد; Sepahbod	سرلشکر; Sarlashkar	سرتیپ; Sartip	سرهنگ; Sarhang	سرهنگ دوم; Sarhang dovom	سرگرد; Sargord	سروان; Sarvān	ستوان یکم; Sotvān yekom	ستوان دوم; Sotvān dovom	ستوان سوم; Sotvān sevom
Imperial Iranian Ground Force	General	Lieutenant general	Major general	Brigadier general	Colonel	Lieutenant colonel	Major	Captain	First lieutenant	Second lieutenant	Third lieutenant
Imperial Iranian Navy
Imperial Iranian Navy	دریابد; Daryabod	دریاسالار; Daryasalar	دریابان; Daryaban	دریادار; Daryadar	ناخدا یکم; Nakhoda yekom	ناخدا دوم; Nakhoda dovom	ناخدا سوم; Nakhoda sevom	ناوسروان; Navsarvan	ناوبان یکم; Navban yekom	ناوبان دوم; Navban dovom	ناوبان سوم; Navban sevom
Imperial Iranian Navy	Admiral	Vice admiral	Rear admiral	Commodore	Captain	Commander	Lieutenant commander	Lieutenant	Lieutenant (junior grade)	Ensign	Ensign junior grade
Imperial Iranian Air Force
Imperial Iranian Air Force	ارتشبد; Arteshbod	سپهبد; Sepahbod	سرلشکر; Sarlashkar	سرتیپ; Sartip	سرهنگ; Sarhang	سرهنگ دوم; Sarhang dovom	سرگرد; Sargord	سروان; Sarvān	ستوان یکم; Sotvān yekom	ستوان دوم; Sotvān dovom	ستوان سوم; Sotvān sevom
Imperial Iranian Air Force	General	Lieutenant general	Major general	Brigadier general	Colonel	Lieutenant colonel	Major	Captain	First lieutenant	Second lieutenant	Third lieutenant
Rank group	General / flag officers				Senior officers			Junior officers

== Other ranks ==
The rank insignia of non-commissioned officers and enlisted personnel.

Rank group	Senior NCOs					Junior NCOs			Enlisted
Imperial Iranian Ground Forces										No insignia
Imperial Iranian Ground Forces	سراستوار یکم; Sarostovār yekom	سراستوار دوم; Sarostovār dovom	استوار یکم; Ostavār yekom	استوار دوم; Ostavār dovom	گروهبان یکم; Goruhbān yekom	گروهبان دوم; Goruhbān dovom	گروهبان سوم; Goruhbān sevom	سرجوخه; Sarjukhe	سرباز یکم; Sarbāz yekom	سرباز صفر; Sarbāz sefr
Rank group	Senior NCOs					Junior NCOs			Enlisted

== See also ==
- Military ranks of Iran
